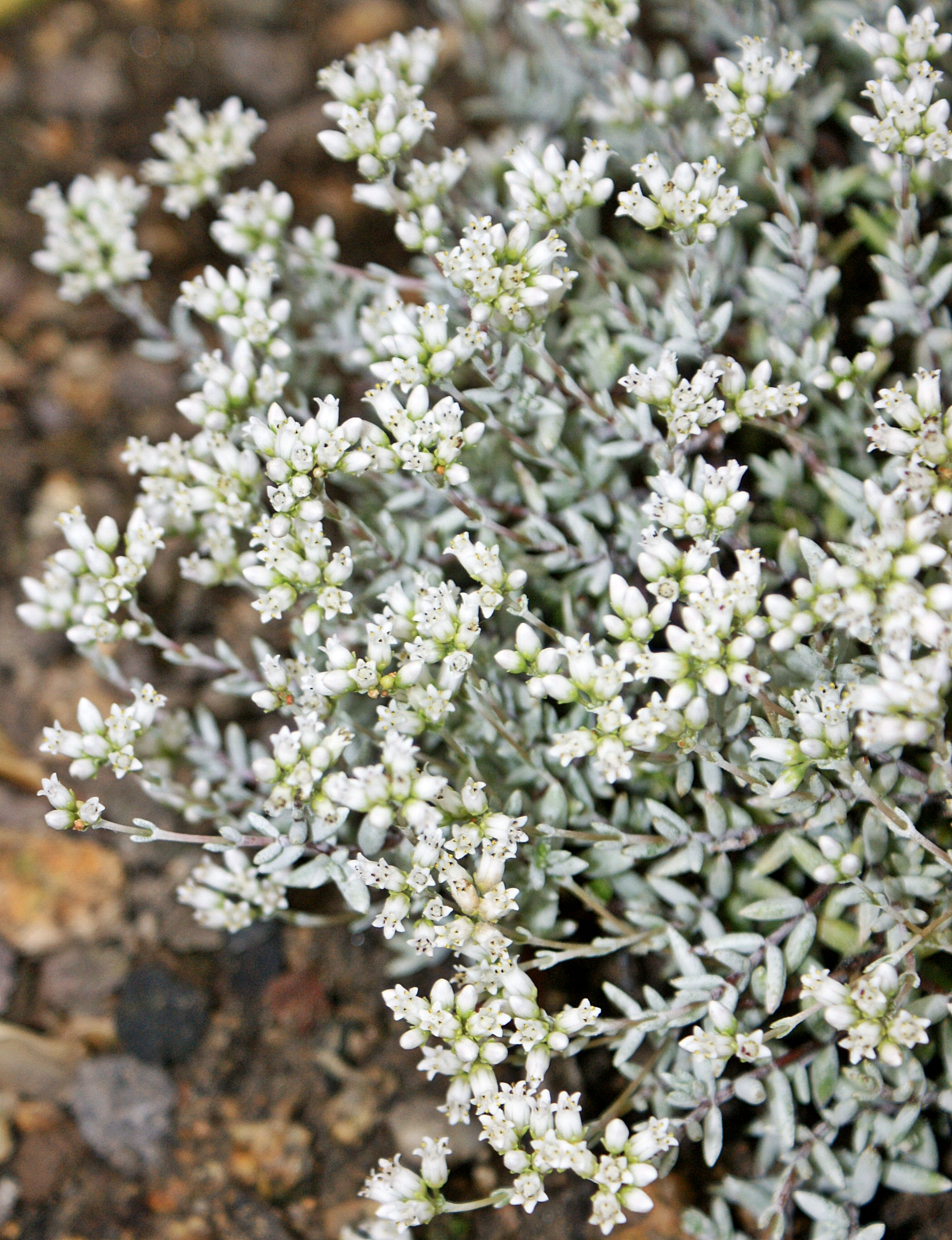
- Crassula biplanata

Scientific classification
- Kingdom: Plantae
- Clade: Tracheophytes
- Clade: Angiosperms
- Clade: Eudicots
- Order: Saxifragales
- Family: Crassulaceae
- Genus: Crassula
- Species: C. biplanata

Binomial name
- Crassula biplanata Haw.

= Crassula biplanata =

Species of plant

Crassula biplanata is a succulent plant native to rocky ledges and mountainous areas in the southern parts of South Africa (the Cape Provinces).

== Description ==
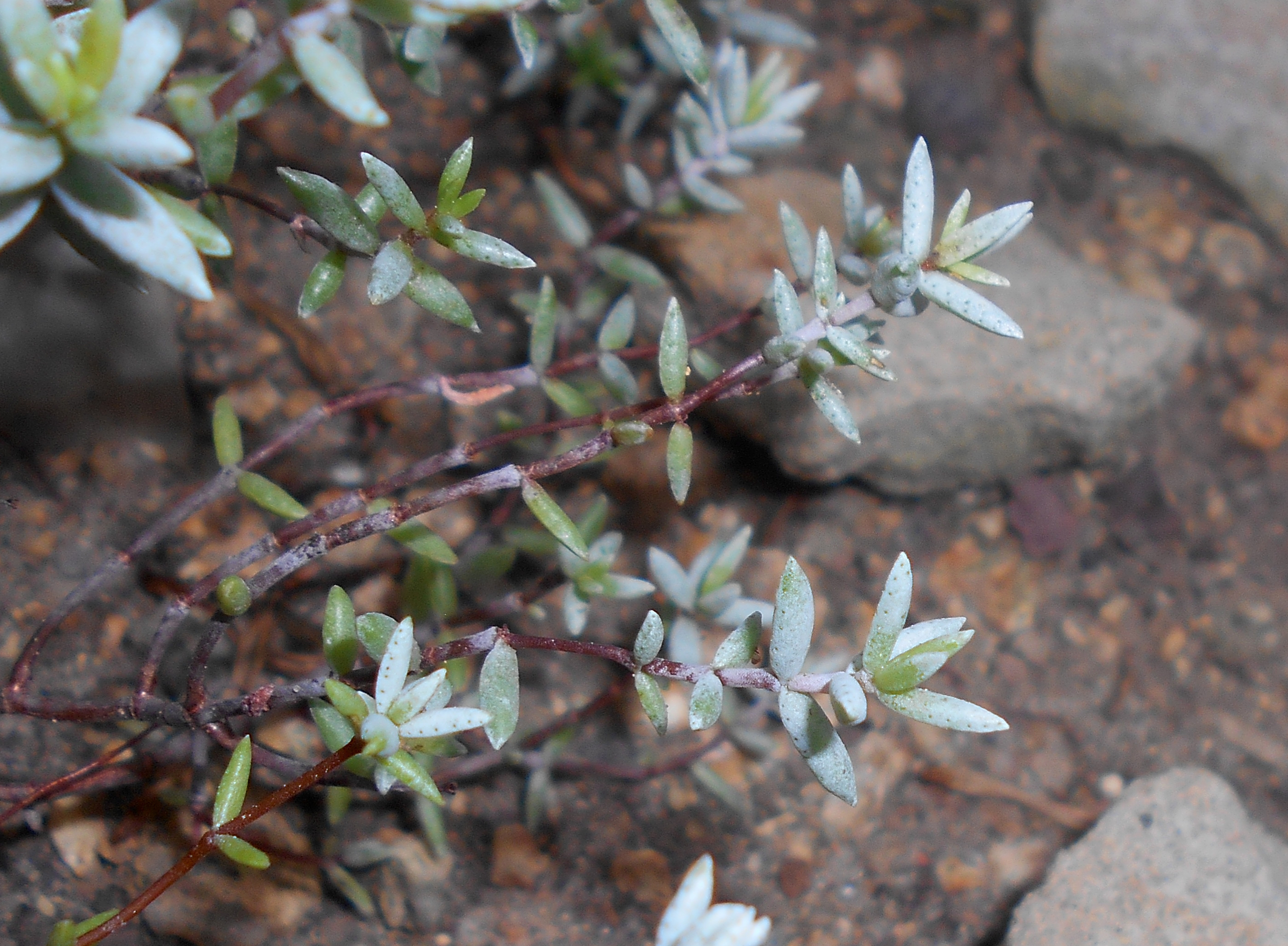
Stem detail

Small (up to 30 cm), branching succulent perennial, with distinctive papillose internodes on its c.0,4cm diameter stem and tiny, gray-green, lanceolate leaves. The leaves become more silver-coloured in direct sunlight.

Delicate tubular, white flowers appear in clusters in late Summer. The petals are distinctively long (4-6 mm).

=== Related species ===
This species has several close relatives, with which it is sometimes confused, namely: Crassula ericoides, Crassula tetragona, Crassula planifolia and Crassula sarcocaulis.

== Distribution ==
It occurs from near Franschhoek in the west, in mountainous areas throughout the Little Karoo and Overberg regions, as far east as Humansdorp in the Eastern Cape Province.

Its habitat is usually shallow soil on rocky ledges or very rocky soil on lower mountain slopes. It is sometimes also found in rock cracks in mountain ranges at higher altitude. In exposed positions the plants are smaller, often decumbent, and can be covered in a dense silvery waxy powder.
