= Kouga Dam =

Dam in Eastern Cape Province, South Africa

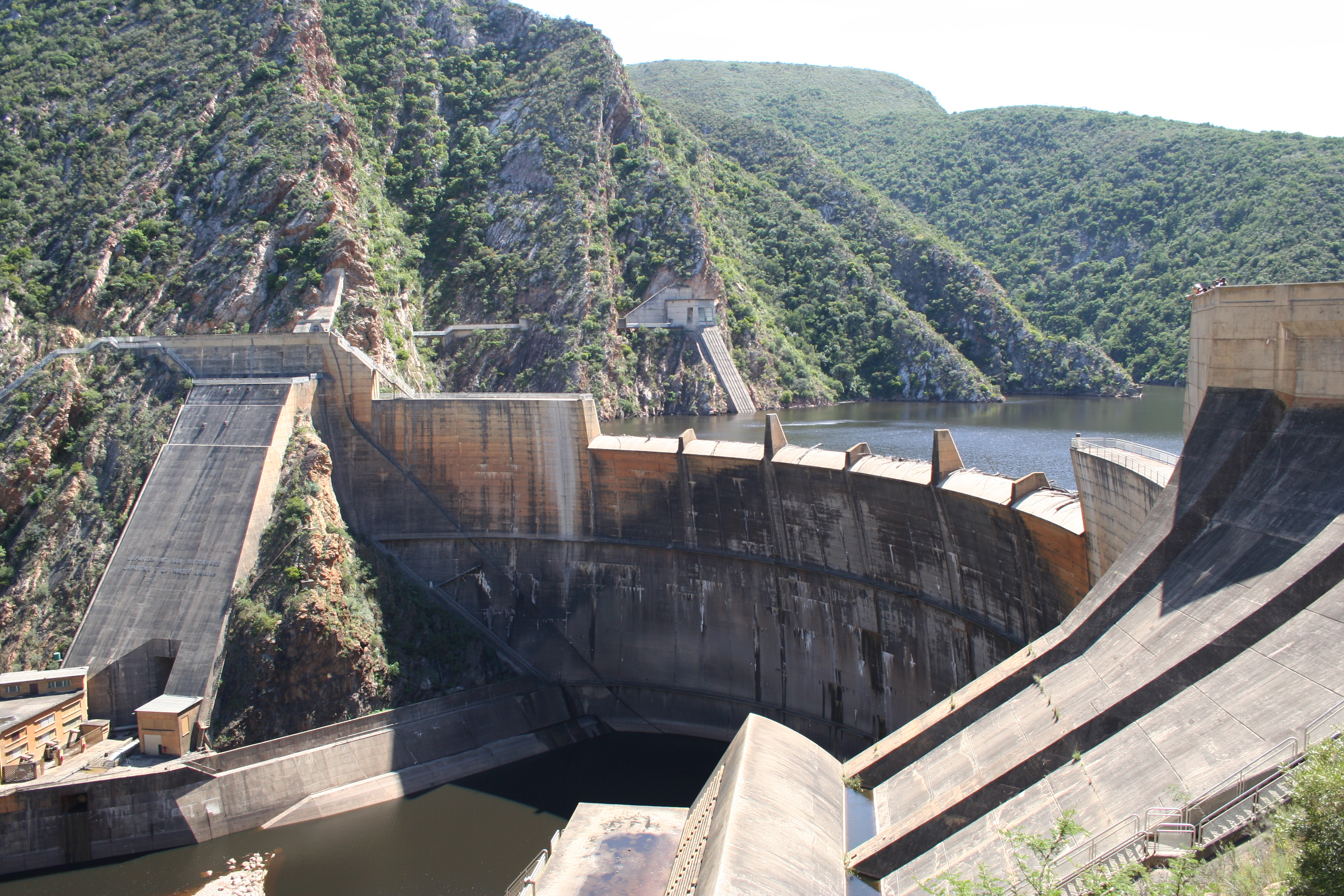

- Location within Eastern Cape
- Official name: Kouga Dam
- Country: South Africa
- Location: Patensie, Kouga Local Municipality, Sarah Baartman District Municipality, Eastern Cape Province
- Coordinates: 33.7406°S 24.5877°E
- Purpose: Irrigation
- Status: Operational
- Construction began: 1957
- Opening date: 1969
- Operators: Department of Water Affairs and Forestry

Dam and spillways
- Type of dam: arch
- Impounds: Kouga River
- Height: 94.5 m (310 ft)
- Length: 202 m (663 ft)
- Dam volume: 268,000 m^{3} (351,000 cu yd)

Reservoir
- Creates: Kouga Dam Reservoir
- Total capacity: 133,000,000 m^{3} (4.7×10^{9} cu ft)
- Catchment area: 388,700 ha (960,000 acres)
- Surface area: 555 ha (1,370 acres)

Kouga Dam Power Station
- Commission date: Mothballed
- Type: Conventional
- Turbines: 3 x 1.2 MW
- Installed capacity: 3.6 MW (4,800 hp)

The Kouga Dam is an arch dam on the Kouga River about 21 km (13 mi) west of Patensie in Kouga Local Municipality, South Africa. It supplies irrigation water to the Kouga and Gamtoos valleys as well as drinking water to the Port Elizabeth metropolitan area via the Loerie Balancing Dam. It was constructed between 1957 and 1969.

The dam can be accessed by following the R330 and then the R331 from the N2 at Humansdorp. All but the last 8 kilometres (5.0 mi) is tarred road and there is a short tunnel just before the dam wall.

It was named the Paul Sauer Dam after Paul Sauer, but was renamed in 1995.

== Kouga Dam Power Station ==
There are three 1200 kVA hydroelectric turbines at the base of the dam, but they are currently not in use.

== See also ==
- List of reservoirs and dams in South Africa
- List of rivers of South Africa
- South African Department of Water Affairs and Forestry
