= Thyspunt, Eastern Cape =

South African coastline

Coordinates: 34.191433°S 24.713953°E

Thyspunt in red with the other potential nuclear sites in blue

Thyspunt is a rocky stretch of coast approximately 12 km WNW of Cape Saint Francis in the Eastern Cape province of South Africa. It is just west of the beach Thysbaai and south-east of Oyster Bay. The point is near the popular surfing beach of Jeffreys Bay as well as the holiday town of St Francis Bay. It lies about 18 km SSW of the town of Humansdorp.

The site has been identified as a possible location for a nuclear reactor to be built by South African electricity utility Eskom. Analysis of impact studies has identified Thyspunt as the preferred site for South Africa's next nuclear power station.

The environmental impact assessments of 2009 have been revised and updated and five public participation meetings held in the area at Oyster Bay Hall, Oyster Bay on 19 October 2015, St Francis Links Golf Club, St. Francis Bay on 20 October 2015, Sea Vista Community Hall, Sea Vista, St. Francis Bay on 21 October 2015, Newton Hall, Jeffrey's Bay on 22 October 2015 and Humansdorp Golf Club, Humansdorp on 23 October 2015.
