= R330 (South Africa) =

Regional route in South Africa

Regional route R330
- R330 route map

Route information
- Length: 49.5 km (30.8 mi)

Major junctions
- North end: R331 at Hankey
- N2; R102
- South end: St. Francis Bay

Location
- Country: South Africa

Highway system
- Numbered routes of South Africa
← R329	→ R331

The R330 is a Regional Route in South Africa that connects Cape St. Francis on the south coast with Hankey to the north via Humansdorp.

== Route ==
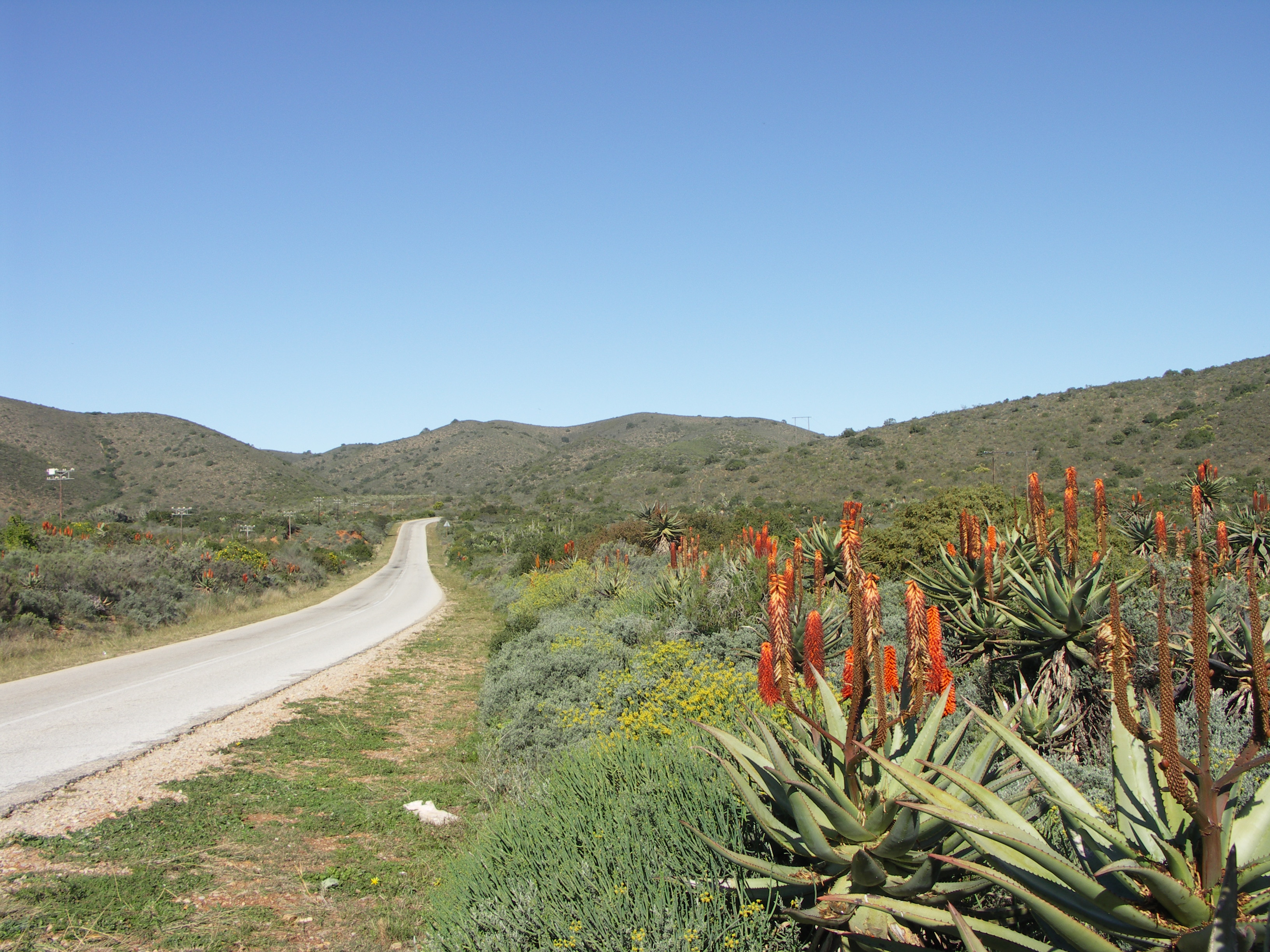
Aloe plants along the R330 near Hankey

Its northern origin is an intersection with the R331 at Hankey. The route heads south-south-west. Just before reaching the N2 it meets the southern origin of the R332. Crossing the N2, it reaches Humansdorp, where it meets the R102 at a staggered interchange. It then heads south, past St. Francis Bay to end at the village of Cape St. Francis.
