= Oyster Bay =

Oyster Bay may refer to:

== Places ==
=== Australia ===
- Oyster Bay, New South Wales, a suburb of Sydney
- Great Oyster Bay, a bay on the east coast of Tasmania

=== Asia ===
- Oyster Bay station (MTR), a proposed MTR station on the Tung Chung line in Hong Kong

=== South Africa ===
- Oyster Bay, Eastern Cape, a small coastal hamlet and resort

=== Tanzania ===
- Oyster Bay, Tanzania, a resort town and suburb of Dar es Salaam

=== United States ===
- Oyster Bay, New York, a town in Nassau County on Long Island, New York
  - Oyster Bay Cove, New York, a village within the town of Oyster Bay
  - Oyster Bay (hamlet), New York, a hamlet within the town of Oyster Bay
    - Oyster Bay (inlet), also Oyster Bay Harbor, an inlet on the north shore of Long Island, New York
    - Oyster Bay station, the terminus of the Long Island Rail Road Oyster Bay Branch
  - South Oyster Bay, a lagoon off the southern shore of Long Island, New York
- Massapequa, New York, which was called South Oyster Bay until late in the 19th century
- Oyster Bay (Puget Sound), a small bay in Totten Inlet, at the south end of Puget Sound in Washington

== Ships ==
- USS Oyster Bay (AGP-6), a United States Navy motor torpedo boat tender and later seaplane tender
