= J-Bay =

J-Bay or Jbay may refer to:

- Jason Bay, Canadian former professional baseball outfielder
- Jeffreys Bay, a town in the Eastern Cape province of South Africa
