= Paradise Beach, South Africa =

Paradise Beach Paradysstrand
- Location within Eastern Cape Location within South Africa
- Coordinates: 34.100°S 24.890°E
- Country: South Africa
- Province: Eastern Cape
- District: Sarah Baartman
- Municipality: Kouga

Area
  - Total: 4.06 km^{2} (1.57 sq mi)

Population (2011)
  - Total: 471
  - Density: 116/km^{2} (300/sq mi)

Racial makeup (2011)
  - Black African: 6.4%
  - Coloured: 0.8%
  - White: 92.4%
  - Other: 0.4%

First languages (2011)
  - Afrikaans: 65.5%
  - English: 31.4%
  - Other: 3.2%
- Time zone: UTC+2 (SAST)
- PO box: 6300

Paradise Beach (Afrikaans: Paradysstrand) is a suburb of Jeffreys Bay in Sarah Baartman District Municipality in the Eastern Cape province of South Africa.

It is situated about 80 kilometres (50 mi) west of Port Elizabeth.
