= Kruisfontein =

- Location within Eastern Cape Location within South Africa
- Coordinates: 34°02′S 24°46′E
- Country: South Africa
- Province: Eastern Cape
- District: Sarah Baartman
- Municipality: Kouga

Area
  - Total: 5.74 km^{2} (2.22 sq mi)

Population (2011)
  - Total: 14,942
  - Density: 2,600/km^{2} (6,740/sq mi)

Racial makeup (2011)
  - Black African: 11.5%
  - Coloured: 87.6%
  - Indian/Asian: 0.4%
  - White: 0.2%
  - Other: 0.3%

First languages (2011)
  - Afrikaans: 91.9%
  - Xhosa: 4.6%
  - English: 2.0%
  - Sotho/Tswana: 0.9%
  - Other: 0.6%
- Time zone: UTC+2 (SAST)
- Postal code (street): 6300
- PO box: 6306
- Area code: 042

Kruisfontein is a suburb of Humansdorp in the Eastern Cape of South Africa with about 15,000 inhabitants.
