= R332 road =

R332 road may refer to:

- R332 road (Ireland)
- R332 road (South Africa)
