= R331 road =

R331 road may refer to:

- R331 road (Ireland)
- R331 road (South Africa)
