= Seal point =

Seal point, Seal Point or Seal-point may refer to:

- Point (coat color), a coat coloration in some breeds of cats
- Seal Point (Graham Land), a headland on the Antarctic Peninsula
- Seal Point (Victoria Land), a headland in the Ross Dependency
- Tyuleniy Point, Queen Maud Land, Antarctica (Tyuleniy is Russian for "seal")
- Seal Point Lighthouse, in South Africa
- Seal Point, a headland on Otago Peninsula, New Zealand
- Seal Point Park, San Francisco, California
- Sealed-point detector, a form of electrolytic detector
- Seal Point, Victoria, a headland near Apollo Bay, Victoria, Australia
