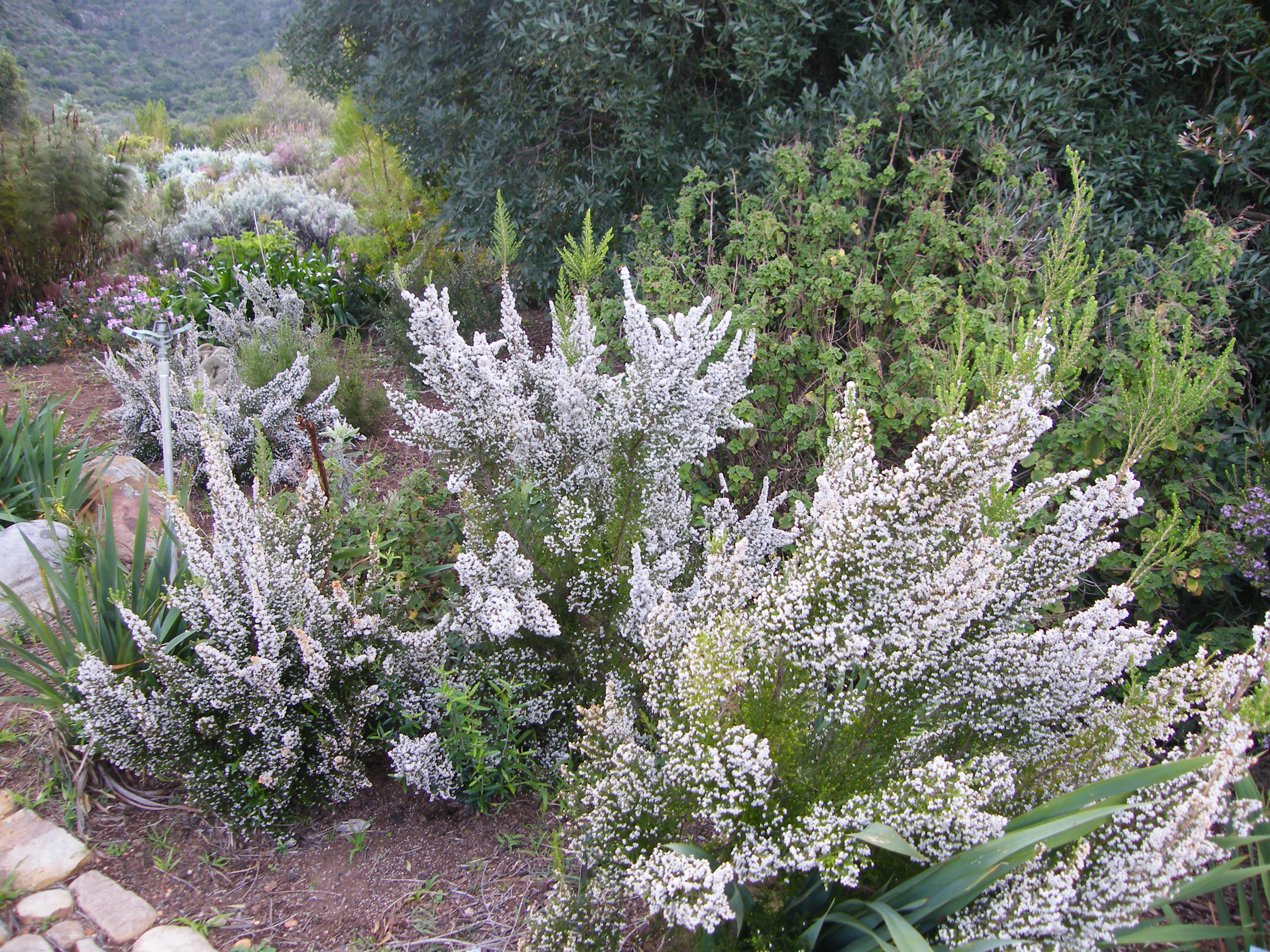

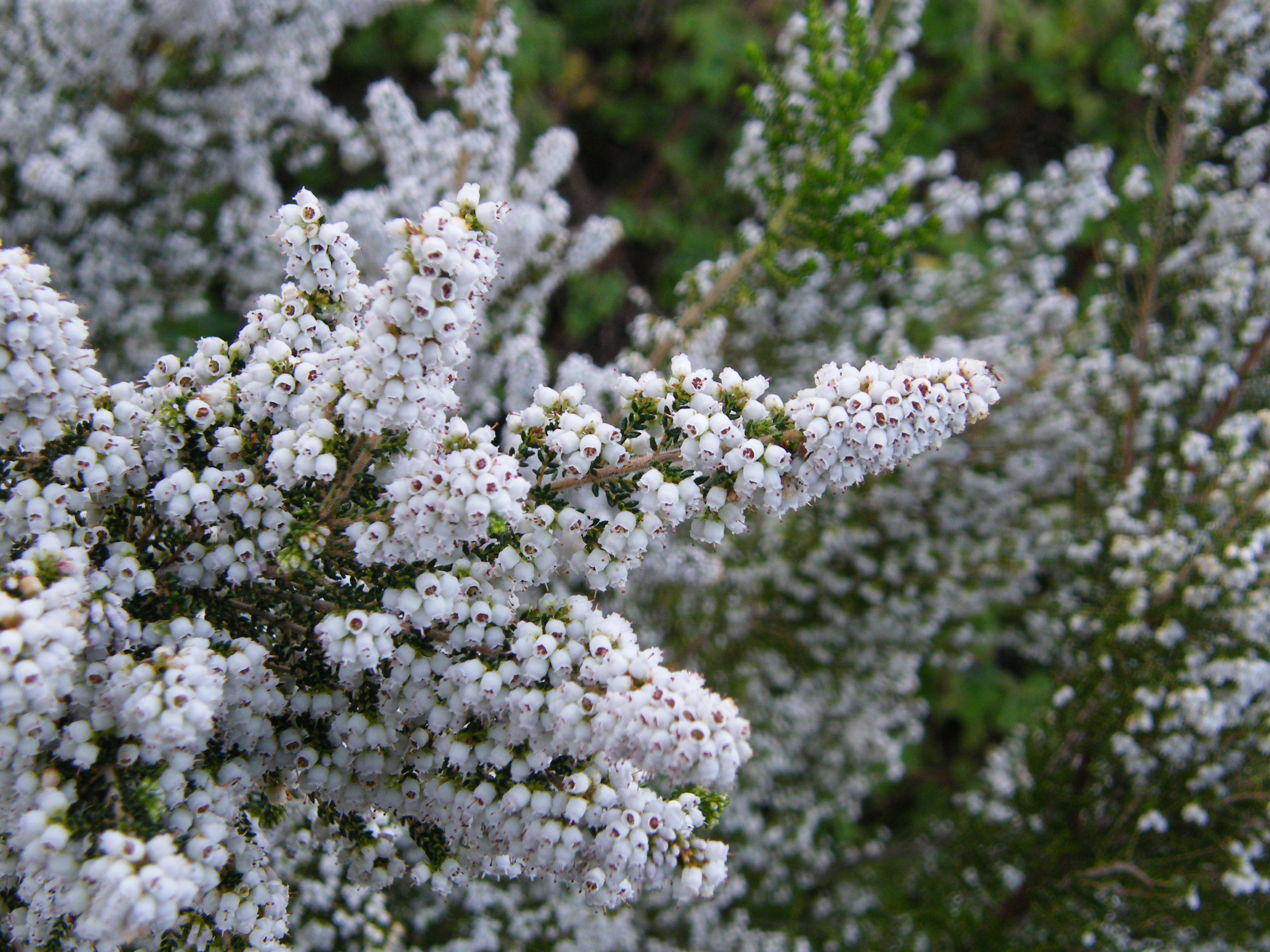

Scientific classification
- Kingdom: Plantae
- Clade: Tracheophytes
- Clade: Angiosperms
- Clade: Eudicots
- Clade: Asterids
- Order: Ericales
- Family: Ericaceae
- Genus: Erica
- Species: E. scabriuscula

Binomial name
- Erica scabriuscula Link

Synonyms
- Erica gibbosa Klotzsch ex Benth.; Erica scabriuscula G.Lodd. ex Sinclair; Ericoides scabriusculum Kuntze

= Erica scabriuscula =

Species of flowering plant

Erica scabriuscula is a plant belonging to the genus Erica and is part of the fynbos. The species is endemic to the Eastern Cape and Western Cape and occurs from Mossel Bay to Humansdorp; in the coastal mountains as well as the coastal plain.
