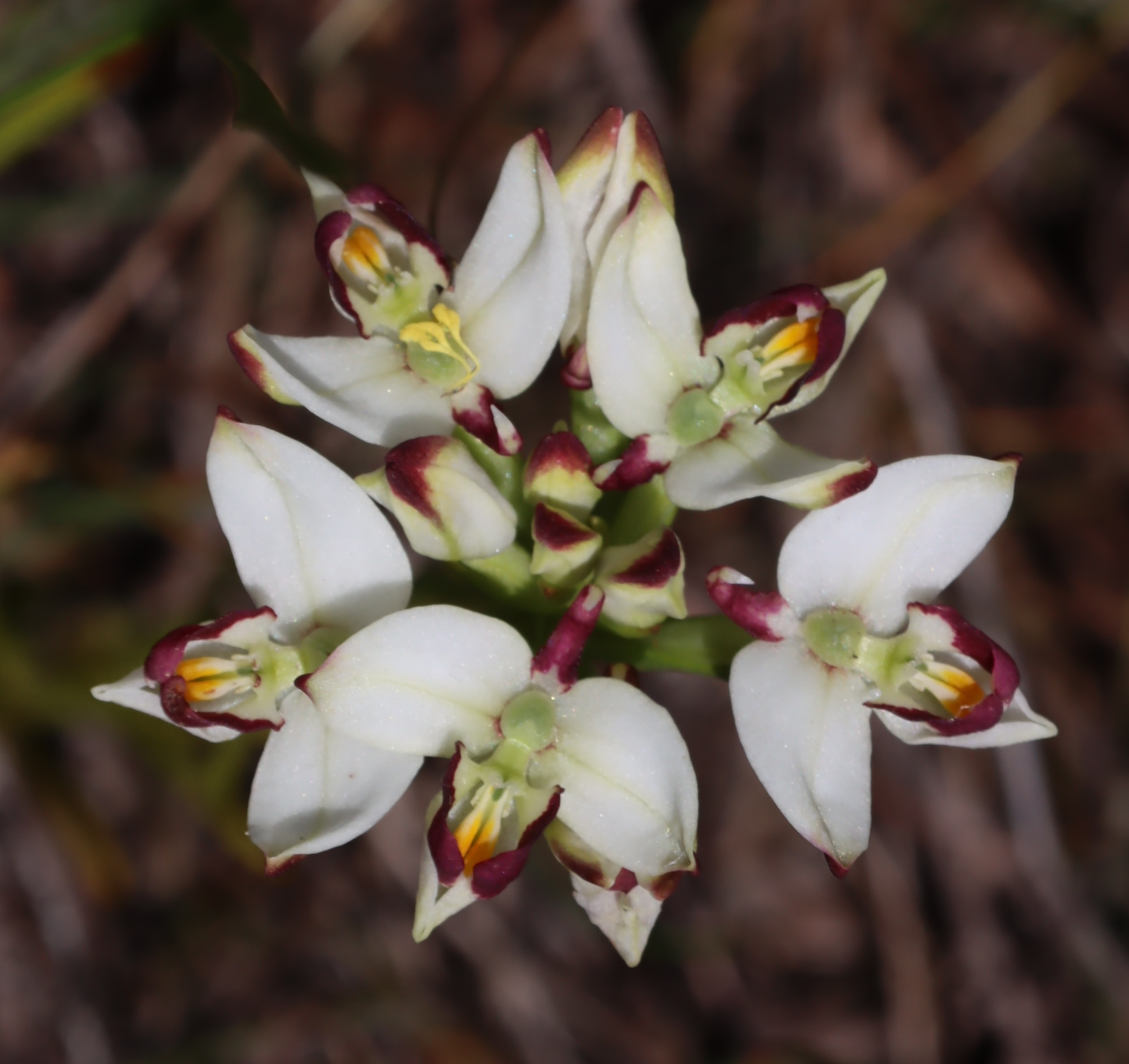

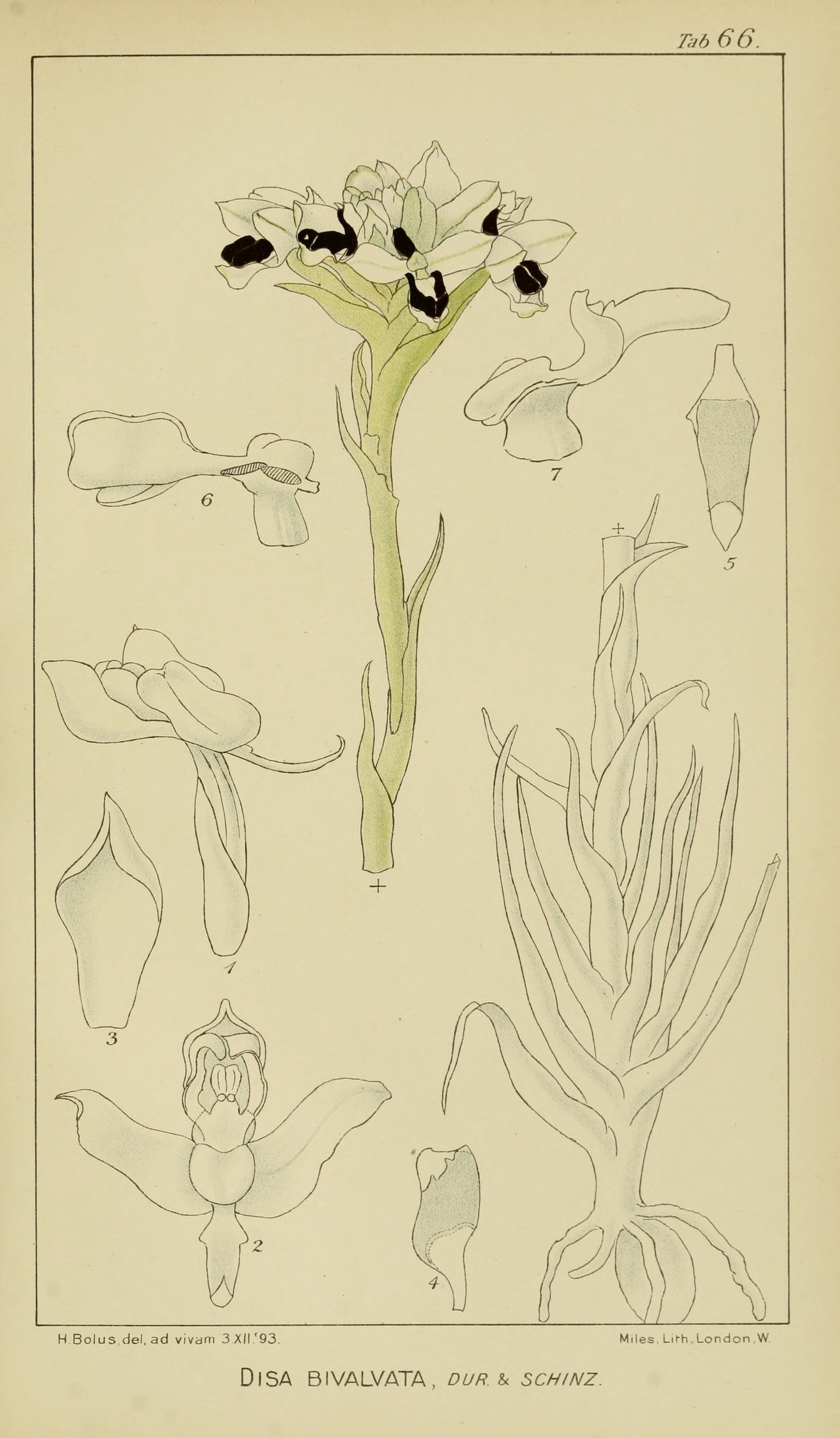

Scientific classification
- Kingdom: Plantae
- Clade: Tracheophytes
- Clade: Angiosperms
- Clade: Monocots
- Order: Asparagales
- Family: Orchidaceae
- Subfamily: Orchidoideae
- Genus: Disa
- Species: D. bivalvata

Binomial name
- Disa bivalvata (L.f.) T.Durand & Schinz

Synonyms
- Disa melaleuca (Thunb.) Sw.; Ophrys bivalvata L.f.; Orthopenthea bivalvata (L.f.) Rolfe; Penthea melaleuca (Thunb.) Lindl.; Serapias melaleuca Thunb.

= Disa bivalvata =

Species of flowering plant

Disa bivalvata is a perennial plant and geophyte belonging to the genus Disa and is part of the fynbos. The plant is endemic to the Eastern Cape and the Western Cape and occurs from the Cape Peninsula to Humansdorp. The plant grows up to 30 cm tall and has bicoloured flowers, it flowers mainly after fires and flowers from September to January. In some places the plant is threatened by invasive plants.
