= Daphnella angustata =

Scientific classification
- Kingdom: Animalia
- Phylum: Mollusca
- Class: Gastropoda
- Subclass: Caenogastropoda
- Order: Neogastropoda
- Superfamily: Conoidea
- Family: Raphitomidae
- Genus: Daphnella
- Species: D. angustata

Binomial name
- Daphnella angustata (Sowerby III, 1886)

Species of gastropod

Daphnella angustata is a species of sea snail, a marine gastropod mollusk in the family Raphitomidae.

== Description ==
The length of the shell attains 12 mm.

== Distribution ==
This marine species occurs off Jeffrey's Bay, South Transkei, South Africa
