= Loerie, South Africa =

Loerie
- Location within Eastern Cape Location within South Africa
- Coordinates: 33.873°S 25.030°E
- Country: South Africa
- Province: Eastern Cape
- District: Sarah Baartman
- Municipality: Kouga

Area
  - Total: 2.77 km^{2} (1.07 sq mi)

Population (2011)
  - Total: 2,787
  - Density: 1,010/km^{2} (2,610/sq mi)

Racial makeup (2011)
  - Black African: 37.7%
  - Coloured: 59.1%
  - Indian/Asian: 0.8%
  - White: 1.7%
  - Other: 0.8%

First languages (2011)
  - Afrikaans: 67.0%
  - Xhosa: 28.2%
  - English: 2.3%
  - Other: 2.4%
- Time zone: UTC+2 (SAST)
- Postal code (street): 6370
- PO box: 6370
- Area code: 042

Loerie (Loerieheuwel is a township situated in Loerie) is a town in Sarah Baartman District Municipality in the Eastern Cape province of South Africa.

Settlement some 25 km north-east of Jeffreys Bay and 11 km north-north-west of the mouth of the Gamtoos River. Said to take its name from the loeries or louries, a turaco species (Tauraco corythaix) occurring here.

Loerie had a railway station on the Avontuur Railway which closed in 2011.

In 1930, the Eastern Province Cement Company opened a limestone quarry and built a 14 km cableway to transport the stone to the Loerie railway station where it was transhipped to the Avontuur Railway to be processed in a cement factory near Port Elizabeth.
