= R332 (South Africa) =

Regional route in South Africa

Regional route R332
- R332 route map

Route information
- Length: 197 km (122 mi)

Location
- Country: South Africa

Highway system
- Numbered routes of South Africa
← R331	→ R334

The R332 is a Regional Route in South Africa that connects Willowmore with the R330 and the N2 near Humansdorp.

== Route ==
Its western origin is the N9 just south of Willowmore. From there it heads south-east along the southern edge of the Baviaanskloof. It crosses the Nuwekloof Pass and thereafter heads east-south-east. About 90 km after the pass, the road passes the Kouga Dam on the south before reaching an intersection with the western origin of the R331. From the intersection, it heads south-south-east to end at the R330 just before it reaches the N2.
