= Erica brachycentra =

Scientific classification
- Kingdom: Plantae
- Clade: Tracheophytes
- Clade: Angiosperms
- Clade: Eudicots
- Clade: Asterids
- Order: Ericales
- Family: Ericaceae
- Genus: Erica
- Species: E. brachycentra

Binomial name
- Erica brachycentra Benth.

Synonyms
- Ericoides brachycentrum (Benth.) Kuntze

Species of flowering plant

Erica brachycentra is a plant belonging to the genus Erica and forming part of the fynbos. The species is endemic to the Eastern Cape and Western Cape. It occurs from Mossel Bay to Humansdorp. There are currently five subpopulations, all on mountain slopes at mountain passes. It is suspected that there may be at least ten subpopulations. The plant's habitat has been ceded to forestry activities but the threat no longer exists.
