= Patensie =

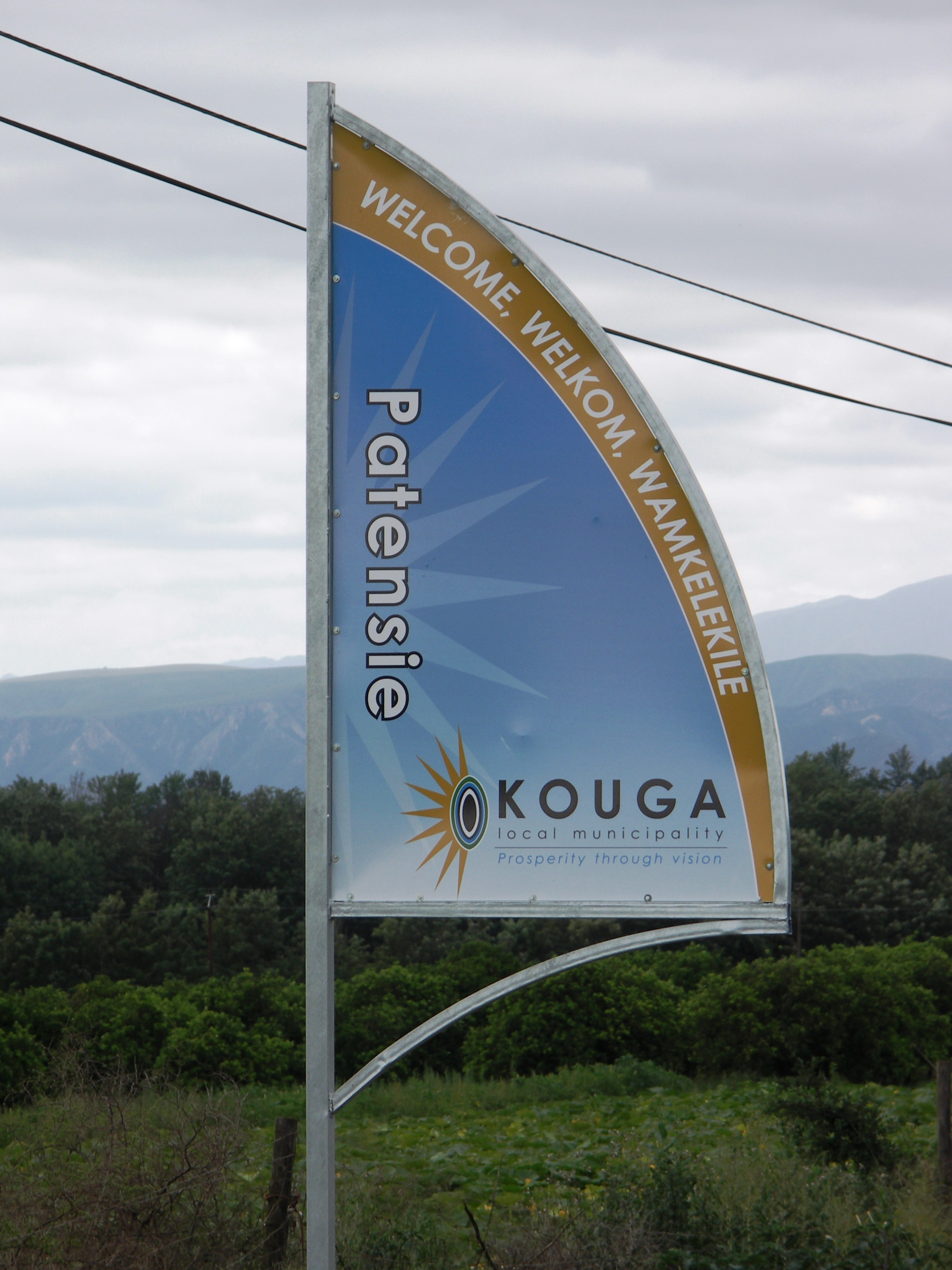
- Signboard on the R331 outside Patensie

- Location within Eastern Cape Location within South Africa
- Coordinates: 33°45′32″S 24°48′53″E
- Country: South Africa
- Province: Eastern Cape
- District: Sarah Baartman
- Municipality: Kouga
- Established: 1858

Area
  - Total: 6.23 km^{2} (2.41 sq mi)

Population (2011)
  - Total: 5,263
  - Density: 845/km^{2} (2,190/sq mi)

Racial makeup (2011)
  - Black African: 39.7%
  - Coloured: 50.2%
  - Indian/Asian: 0.2%
  - White: 8.0%
  - Other: 1.9%

First languages (2011)
  - Afrikaans: 70.0%
  - Xhosa: 24.9%
  - English: 1.4%
  - Other: 3.7%
- Time zone: UTC+2 (SAST)
- Postal code (street): 6335
- PO box: 6335
- Area code: 042
- Website: patensie-is-lekker.co.za

Patensie is a town in Sarah Baartman District Municipality in the Eastern Cape province of South Africa. Patensie lies along the R331 road just south of Noorshoek. The Kouga Dam is located several kilometres to the west. The name is Khoi in origin, and means "cattle resting place". The town is a centre for the citrus, tobacco, and vegetable farms in the area.
