= Seal Point Lighthouse =

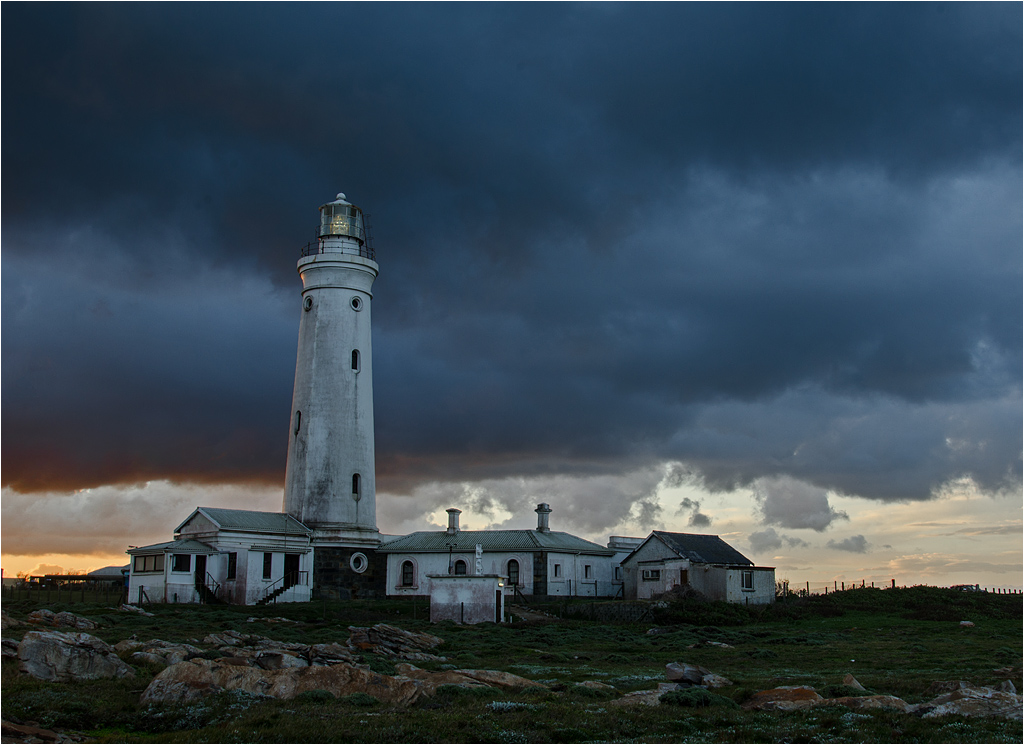
- Location: Cape St. Francis, Kouga Local Municipality (Sarah Baartman District Municipality); Eastern Cape; South Africa
- Coordinates: 34°12′44.6″S 24°50′10.4″E

Tower
- Constructed: 1878
- Construction: brick tower
- Height: 27.75 metres (91.0 ft)
- Shape: cylindrical tower with balcony and lantern rising from one-story keeper's house
- Markings: white tower and lantern
- Power source: mains electricity
- Fog signal: Horn Mo(C) 30s

Light
- First lit: 4 July 1878
- Focal height: 36 metres (118 ft)
- Lens: Fresnel
- Intensity: 2,750,000 cd
- Range: 28 nautical miles (52 km)
- Characteristic: Fl W 5s.

Seal Point is a lighthouse on Cape St. Francis in the Eastern Cape of South Africa. The lighthouse is operational and houses a museum. Public access to the top of the tower is allowed in the company of a guide. Construction on the lighthouse started in November 1875 and it became operational on 4 July 1878. Total construction cost was £20,000. The lighthouse was used by SANCOB to house penguins and other birdlife. This was until its closure in recent years. Currently, the area around the lighthouse has been developed into bike paths.

== See also ==
- List of lighthouses in South Africa
