= Aston Bay, South Africa =

Aston Bay
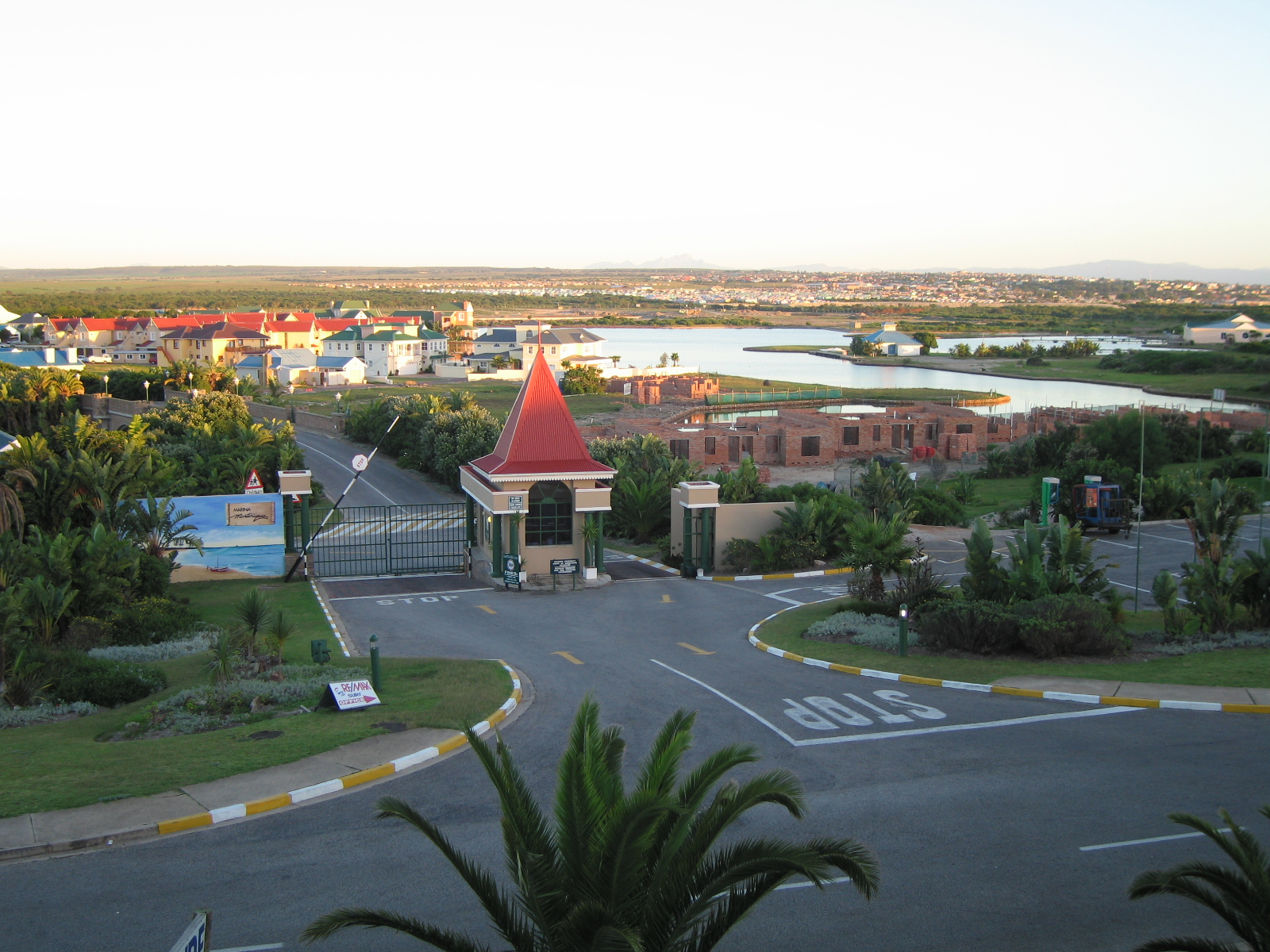
- Marina Martinique, Aston Bay

- Location within Eastern Cape Location within South Africa
- Coordinates: 34.078°S 24.910°E
- Country: South Africa
- Province: Eastern Cape
- District: Sarah Baartman
- Municipality: Kouga

Area
  - Total: 1.08 km^{2} (0.42 sq mi)

Population (2011)
  - Total: 792
  - Density: 733/km^{2} (1,900/sq mi)

Racial makeup (2011)
  - Black African: 2.9%
  - Coloured: 2.8%
  - White: 94.2%
  - Other: 0.1%

First languages (2011)
  - Afrikaans: 69.3%
  - English: 27.6%
  - Xhosa: 1.0%
  - Other: 2.1%
- Time zone: UTC+2 (SAST)
- Postal code (street): 6332
- PO box: 6332

Aston Bay is a suburb of Jeffreys Bay in Sarah Baartman District Municipality in the Eastern Cape province of South Africa. It incorporates Marina Martinique, a large residential marina.

It is situated about 80 kilometres (50 mi) west of Port Elizabeth.

It was established as a fishing village in the 1850s.
