= Hankey =

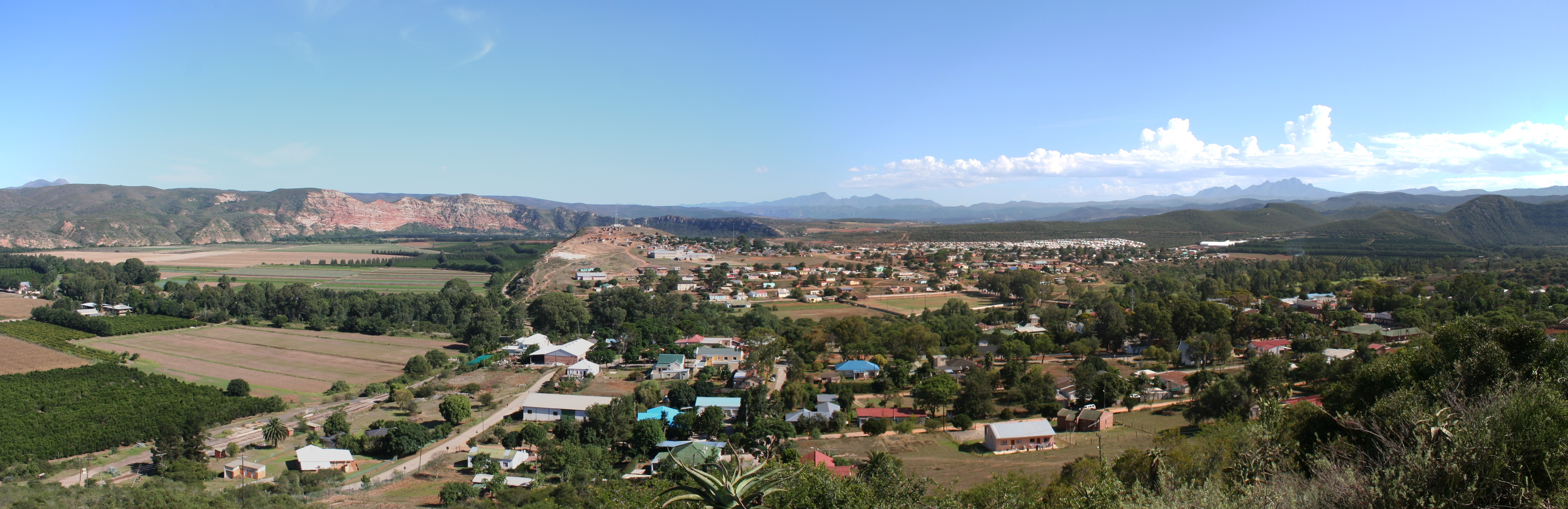
- View over Hankey from Vergaderingskop, with Centerton visible in the distance

- Location within Eastern Cape Location within South Africa
- Coordinates: 33°49′53″S 24°52′51″E
- Country: South Africa
- Province: Eastern Cape
- District: Sarah Baartman
- Municipality: Kouga

Area
  - Total: 21.02 km^{2} (8.12 sq mi)

Population (2011)
  - Total: 11,761
  - Density: 559.5/km^{2} (1,449/sq mi)

Racial makeup (2011)
  - Black African: 45.5%
  - Coloured: 51.5%
  - Indian/Asian: 0.1%
  - White: 2.3%
  - Other: 0.6%

First languages (2011)
  - Afrikaans: 55.7%
  - Xhosa: 39.4%
  - English: 2.0%
  - Other: 2.9%
- Time zone: UTC+2 (SAST)
- Postal code (street): 6350
- PO box: 6350
- Area code: 042

Hankey is a small town on the confluence of the Klein and Gamtoos rivers in South Africa. It is part of the Kouga Local Municipality of the Sarah Baartman District in the Eastern Cape.

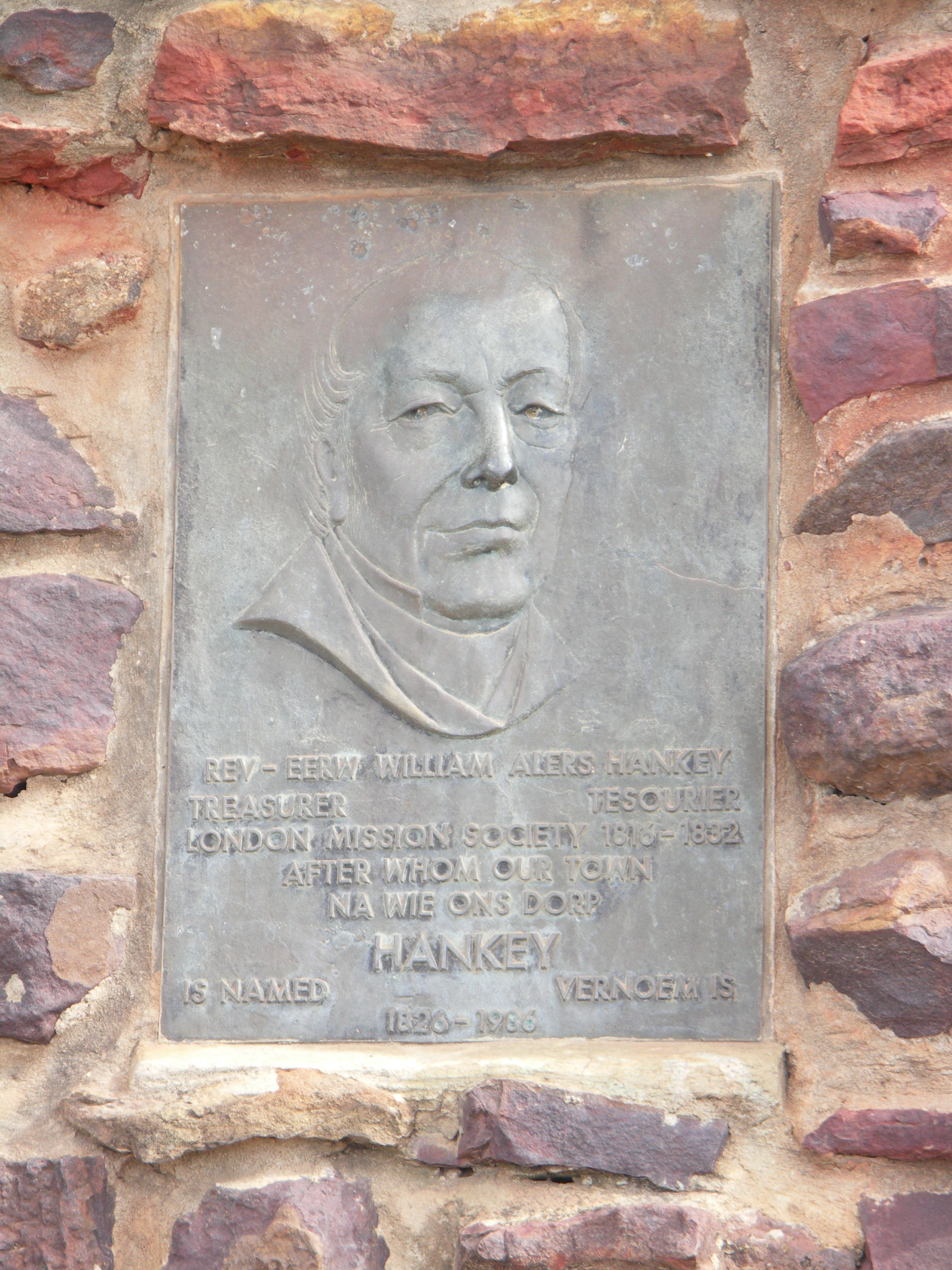
Engraving of Reverend William Alers Hankey on a monument in Hankey

== History ==
Hankey was established in 1826 and is the Gamtoos Valley's oldest town. It was named after the Rev. William Alers Hankey (1771–1859), an ex-banker and the secretary of the London Missionary Society (LMS). He was born in Aberdeen, Scotland (though the Missionary Society's successor body's obituary gives the place of his birth as London), as William Alers, the natural son of the London banker, merchant, Jamaica planter and treasurer of the Foundling Hospital, Thomas Hankey of Fetcham Park (the Hankey Bank, which was to become part of the Royal Bank of Scotland, had been founded in 1685 by Thomas Hankey's great-great-grandfather, Captain Samuel Hankey, who had also been a partner in "Houblon & Hankey" with a John Houblon, who was presumably the same who became the first Governor of the Bank of England) and Susannah Alers, and educated, according to his father's 1793 will, at the University of Edinburgh. Some descendants used Alers as part of their surnames, including Captain Conrad Byron Alers-Hankey, Royal Navy (who helped rescue HMS Calcutta when the 1926 Havana–Bermuda hurricane struck the Royal Naval Dockyard, Bermuda in 1926, and was awarded the Distinguished Service Cross for his conduct at the 1940 evacuation of Dunkirk), while others used it as a forename, such as Alexander Maurice Alers Hankey and brothers Maurice Pascal Alers Hankey, 1st Baron Hankey (the creator of the modern UK Cabinet Office) and Donald William Alers Hankey.

The purpose of the establishment of the village was to grow mielies and corn for the LMS main station at Bethelsdorp and also to carry out evangelistic work. The first property was "Wagondrift" owned by the Damant Bros. And although the town was planned for 250 families it started with 25 families. The first inhabitants consisted of a large number of Khoi, a few Mfengos, a few farmers and mixed "Gamtouer" (1700) descendants.

The LMS founded the station in 1822, terminated it in 1875 and in 1876 it became independent from the LMS. It became a Congregational Church as it is today. The first trustees of the LMS were Dr John Philip and the Rev. William Alers Hankey. The first missionaries were Messrs Miles, Melville, Williams, later the Philips' (Will Enowy and Thom Durant Philip)

Dr John Philip was superintendent. Some of the residents were Windvogel, Diederich, Abraham, Stuurman, Dragoonder, Armoed, Scheepers, Mahtjies, Gerts, Matroos, Konstabel and Kettledas. The first white farmers were Messrs. Wait, Salmon Ferreira, Stefanus Ferreira and the Damant Bros.

The first irrigation scheme on the Klein Rivier was started by James Wait in 1827 and completed in 1830. It extended for 5.6 km (3.5 mi) and he was awarded 50 cattle and the use of 50 workers. Part of this irrigation scheme can still be seen today and forms part of the Hankey Golf Course.

The second irrigation scheme on the Gamtoos River, a provincial heritage site in Hankey today, was carried out by William Enowy Philip, the son of the Superintendent of the LMS, Dr John Philip. His inspiration was the window in the hill between Backhousehoek and Vensterhoek and was dug using pick and shovel and wheelbarrows. The length of the tunnel was 228 metres, the speed of construction was very slow, about 30 to 60 cm (1 to 2 ft) a day. It was started in April 1843 and completed in August 1844, 15 months later. It was in use from April 1845 to 1970 – a period of 125 years. This was the first ever tunnel scheme in South Africa.

In 1822 Dr John Philip, the superintendent of the London Missionary Society established a mission station on the farm Wagendrift and named it after Reverend William Alers Hankey, the treasurer of the London Missionary Society. An irrigation tunnel constructed under direction of William Philip, the son of Dr John Philip, is today protected as a provincial heritage site.

On 19 August 2002, the remains of Saartjie Baartman were laid to rest on Vergaderingskop, a hill on the edge of town.

As is the case with most South African towns, there are residential areas previously reserved for non-white residents set up on the outskirts of the town. In the case of Hankey these are Centerton on the western edge of the town (on the opposite bank of the Klein River) and Weston, located about 1.5 kilometres (0.93 mi) to the south-west (on the opposite bank of the Gamtoos River).

== Transport ==
Hankey is located on the junction of the R330 and the R331 roads and the Avontuur Railway passes through the town.

== See also ==
- Saartjie Baartman
