= Oyster Bay, South Africa =

Oyster Bay Oesterbaai
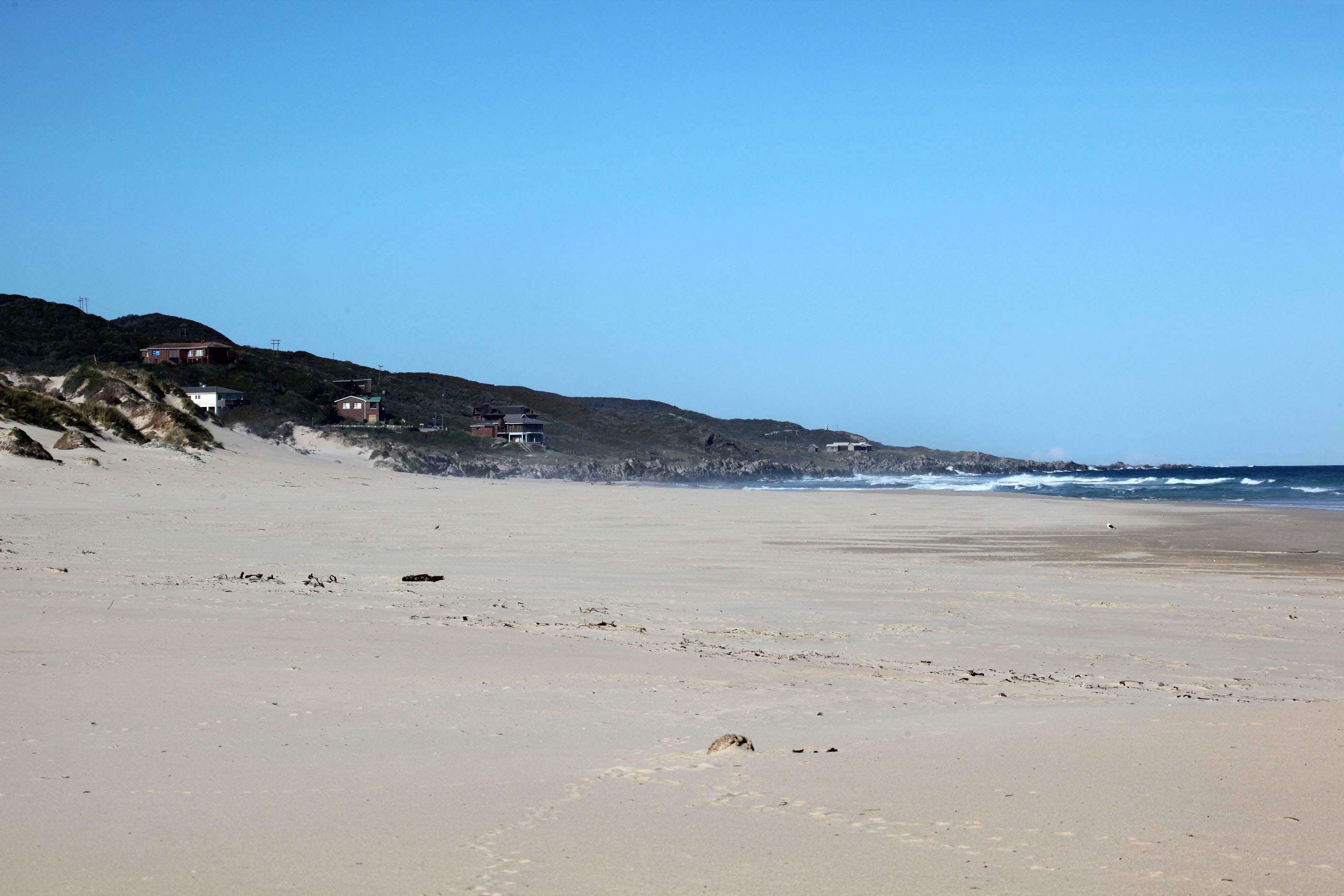
- The eastern side of the bay

- Location within Eastern Cape Location within South Africa
- Coordinates: 34°10′10″S 24°39′15″E
- Country: South Africa
- Province: Eastern Cape
- District: Sarah Baartman
- Municipality: Kouga
- Established: 1967

Area
  - Total: 1.81 km^{2} (0.70 sq mi)
- Elevation: 3 m (9.8 ft)

Population (2011)
  - Total: 674
  - Density: 372/km^{2} (964/sq mi)

Racial makeup (2011)
  - Black African: 41.2%
  - Coloured: 40.2%
  - Indian/Asian: 0.1%
  - White: 18.0%
  - Other: 0.4%

First languages (2011)
  - Afrikaans: 73.1%
  - Xhosa: 21.0%
  - English: 3.9%
  - Sotho: 1.3%
  - Other: 0.7%
- Time zone: UTC+2 (SAST)
- Postal code (street): 6301
- PO box: 6301

Oyster Bay (Afrikaans: Oesterbaai) is a small coastal hamlet and resort located about 22.5 kilometres (14.0 mi) west of St Francis Bay on the Eastern Cape Coast of South Africa. It forms part of the Kouga Local Municipality of the Sarah Baartman District.

Oyster Bay is the closest community to Thyspunt, the preferred site for South Africa's next nuclear power station.
