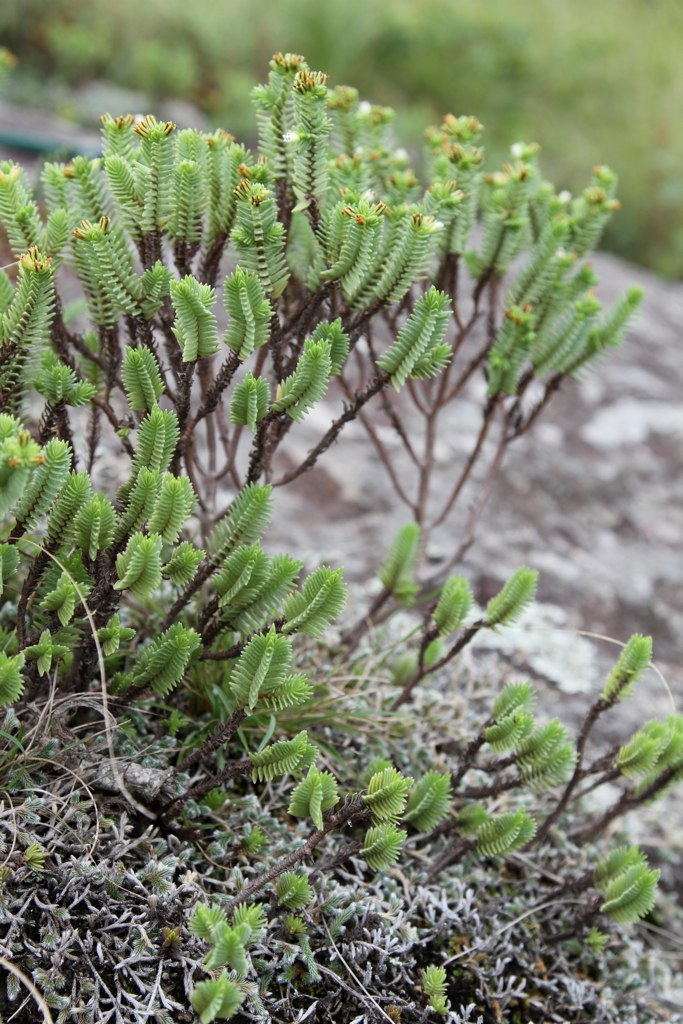

Scientific classification
- Kingdom: Plantae
- Clade: Tracheophytes
- Clade: Angiosperms
- Clade: Eudicots
- Order: Saxifragales
- Family: Crassulaceae
- Genus: Crassula
- Species: C. ericoides

Binomial name
- Crassula ericoides Haw.

= Crassula ericoides =

Species of plant

Crassula ericoides is a species of succulent plant in the genus Crassula native to South Africa. Growing in the fynbos ecosystem of South Africa, C. ericoides somewhat resembles a heather, growing into an upright shrub with bare lower stems and yellow flowers at the tips.

== Subspecies ==
Crassula ericoides has two subspecies:

- Crassula ericoides subsp. ericoides
- Crassula ericoides subsp. tortuosa

C. ericoides subsp. ericoides is more common, whereas subsp. tortuosa is a prostrate shrub form that grows at higher elevations.
