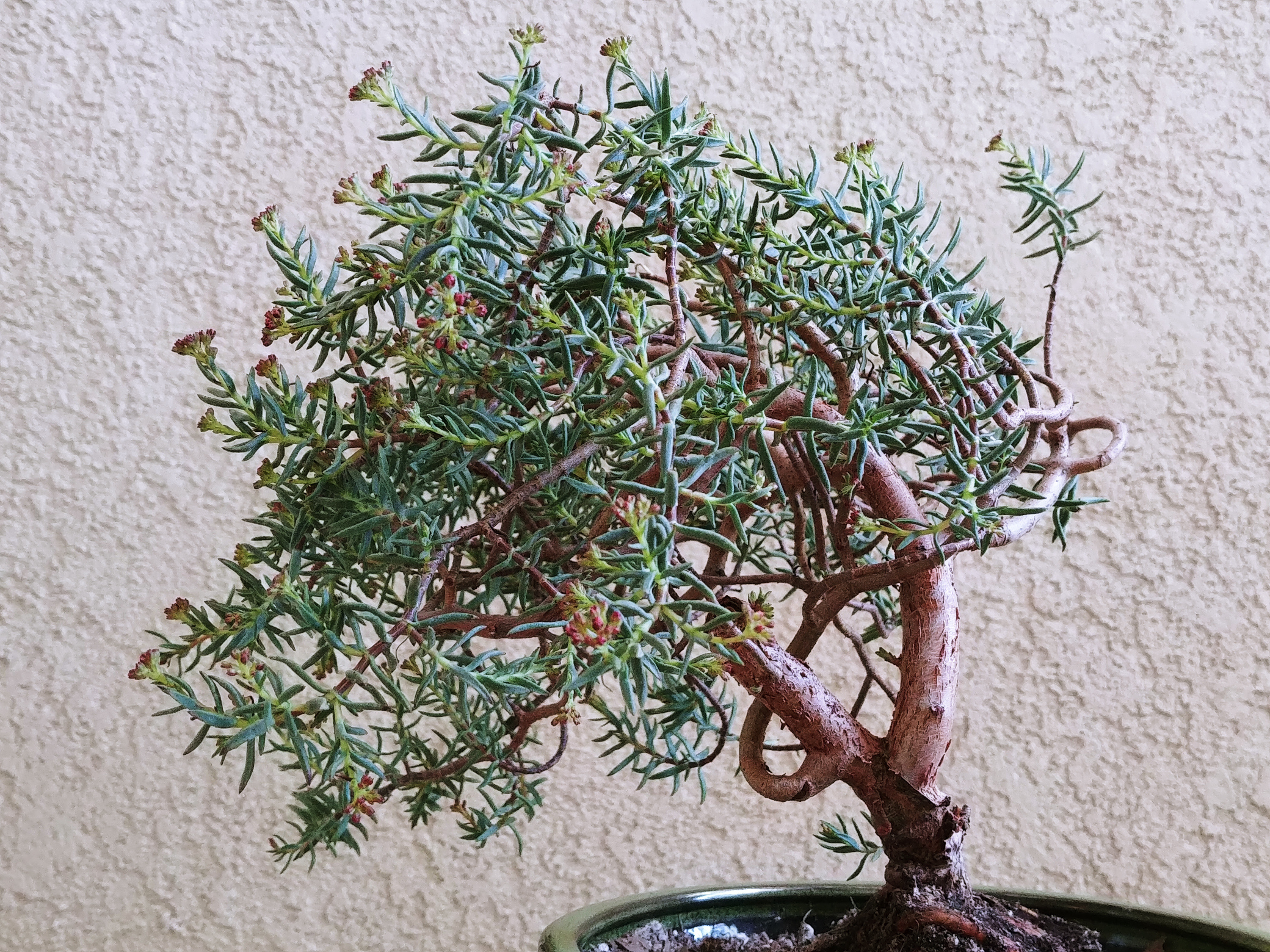

Scientific classification
- Kingdom: Plantae
- Clade: Tracheophytes
- Clade: Angiosperms
- Clade: Eudicots
- Order: Saxifragales
- Family: Crassulaceae
- Genus: Crassula
- Species: C. sarcocaulis

Binomial name
- Crassula sarcocaulis Eckl. & Zeyh.

= Crassula sarcocaulis =

Species of succulent

Crassula sarcocaulis is a small shrubby succulent plant known by the common name bonsai crassula, due to its bonsai-like appearance. It is a perennial plant native to the southern and southeastern Africa, ranging from Malawi and Mozambique through Zimbabwe, Swaziland, Lesotho, and South Africa. It grows on mountain slopes in rocky terrain.

== Description ==
Bonsai crassula has small pink or white flowers that appear in summer. The flowers are described as smelling like honey or blackcurrant jelly. The plant grows to about 30–50 cm (1-1.5 ft) high and wide.

== Cultivation ==
This hardy little plant is among the most tolerant of cold temperatures in its genus, down to around -12 °C (10 °F), as well as being heat-tolerant

It is drought-tolerant and generally disease-free, but can be affected by aphids, mealybugs, and vine weevils. It can be grown indoors or outdoors, with full or partial sunshine, but full sunlight is preferred. Like most succulents, it prefers well-drained soil and only occasional watering.

== Gallery ==
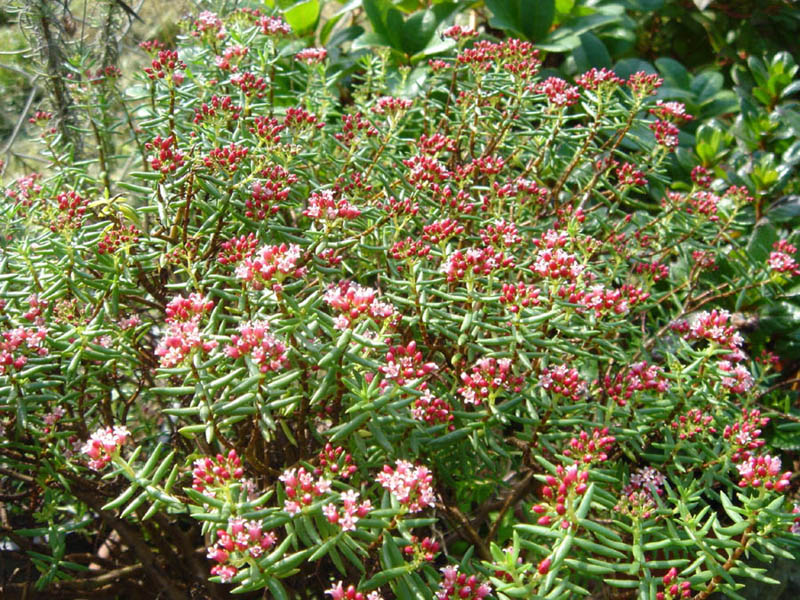

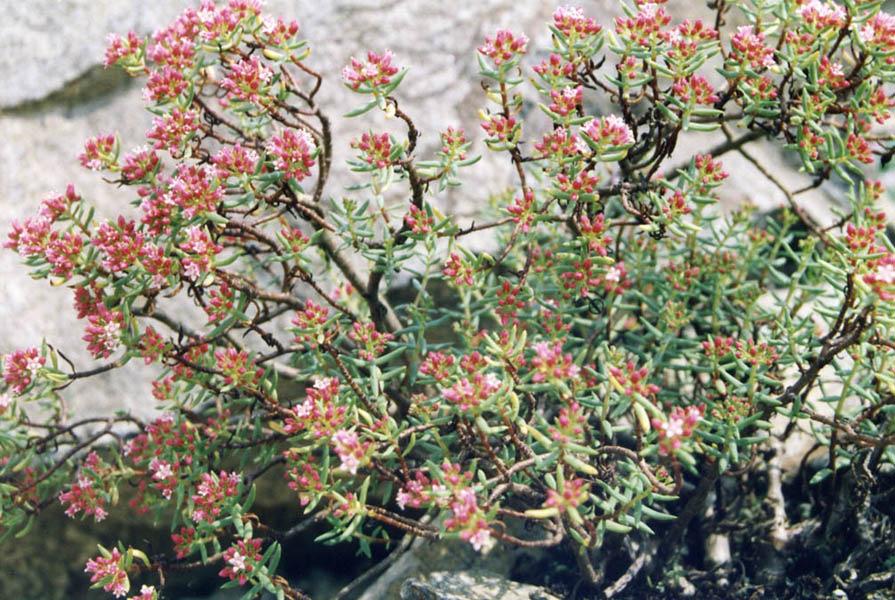

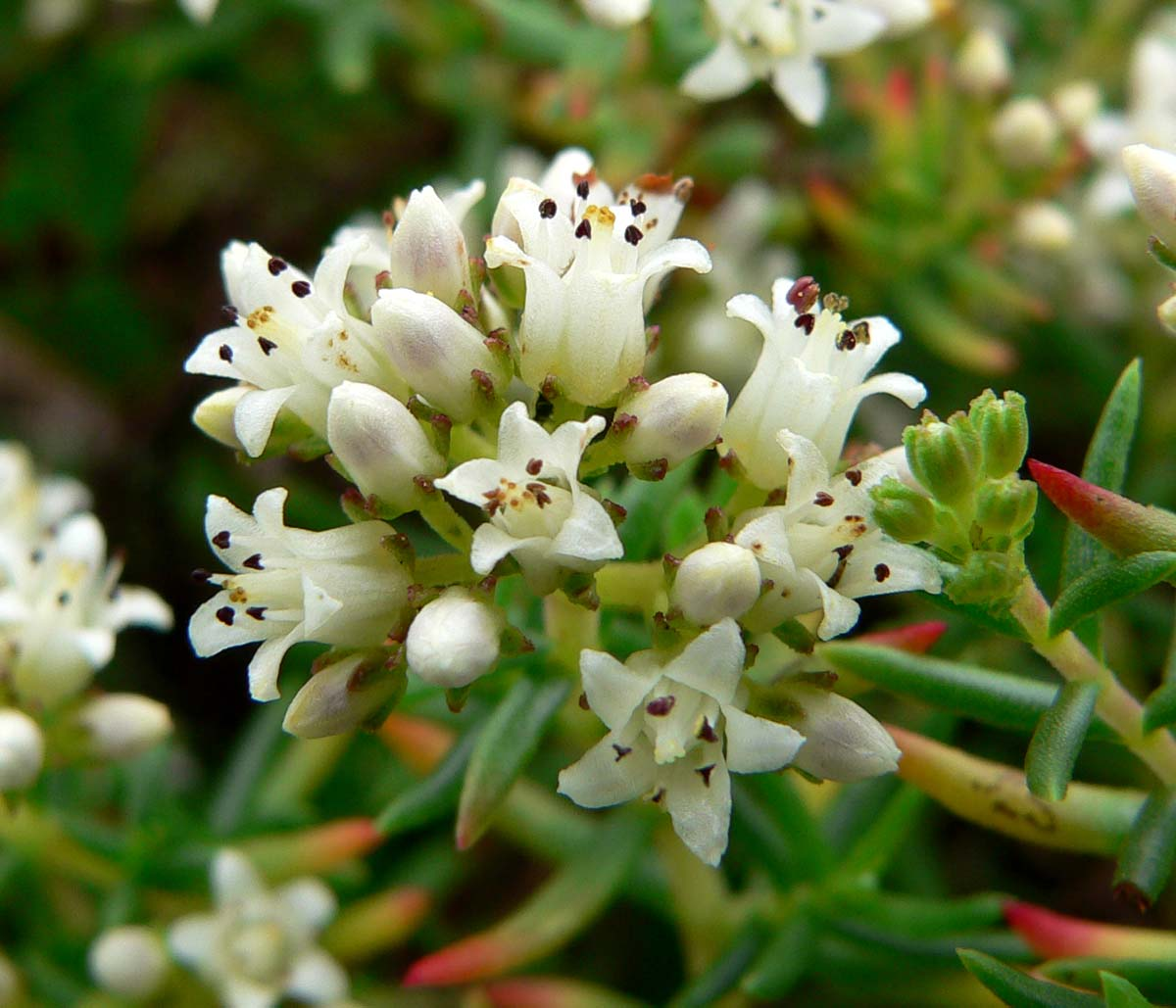

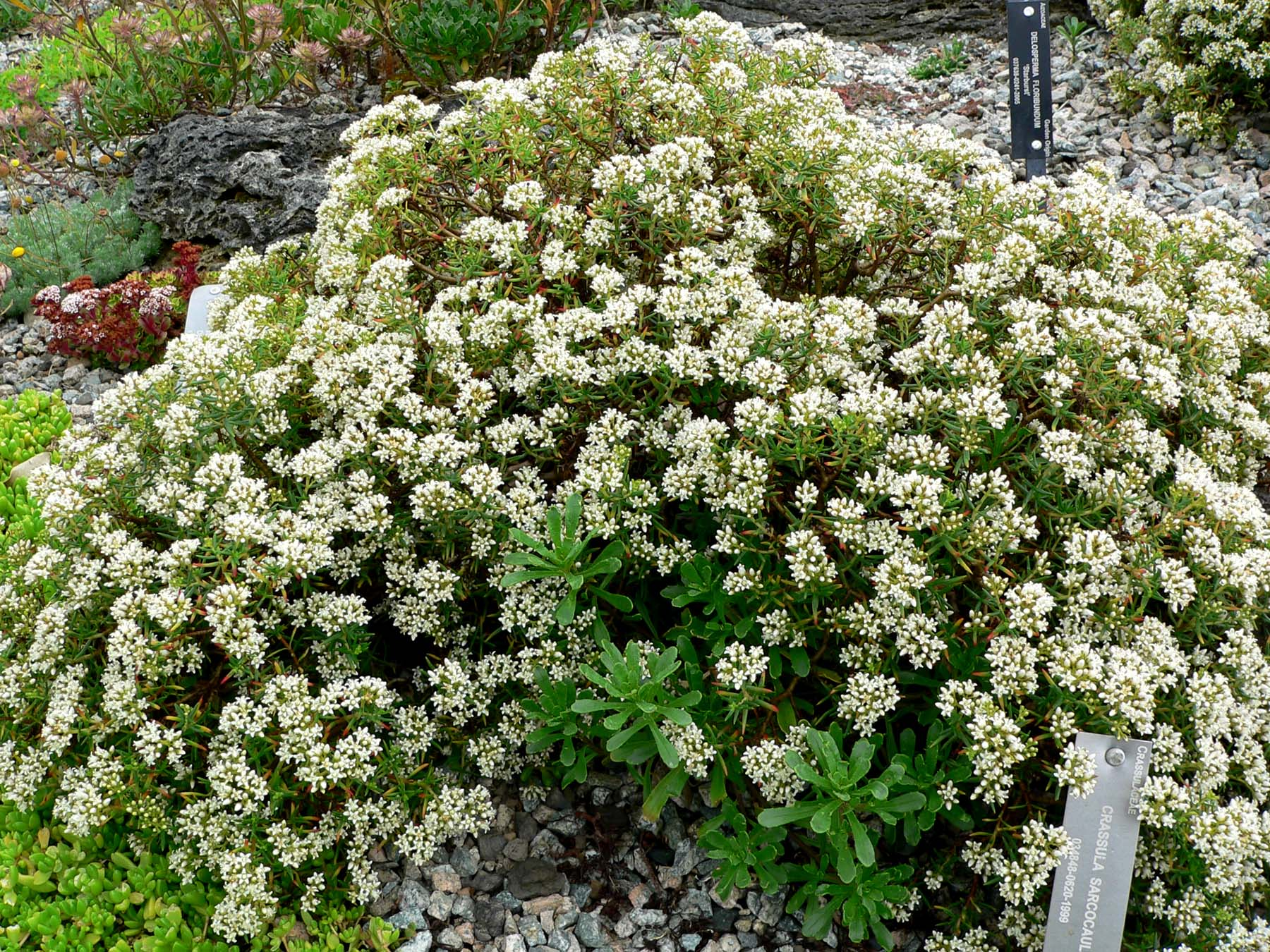

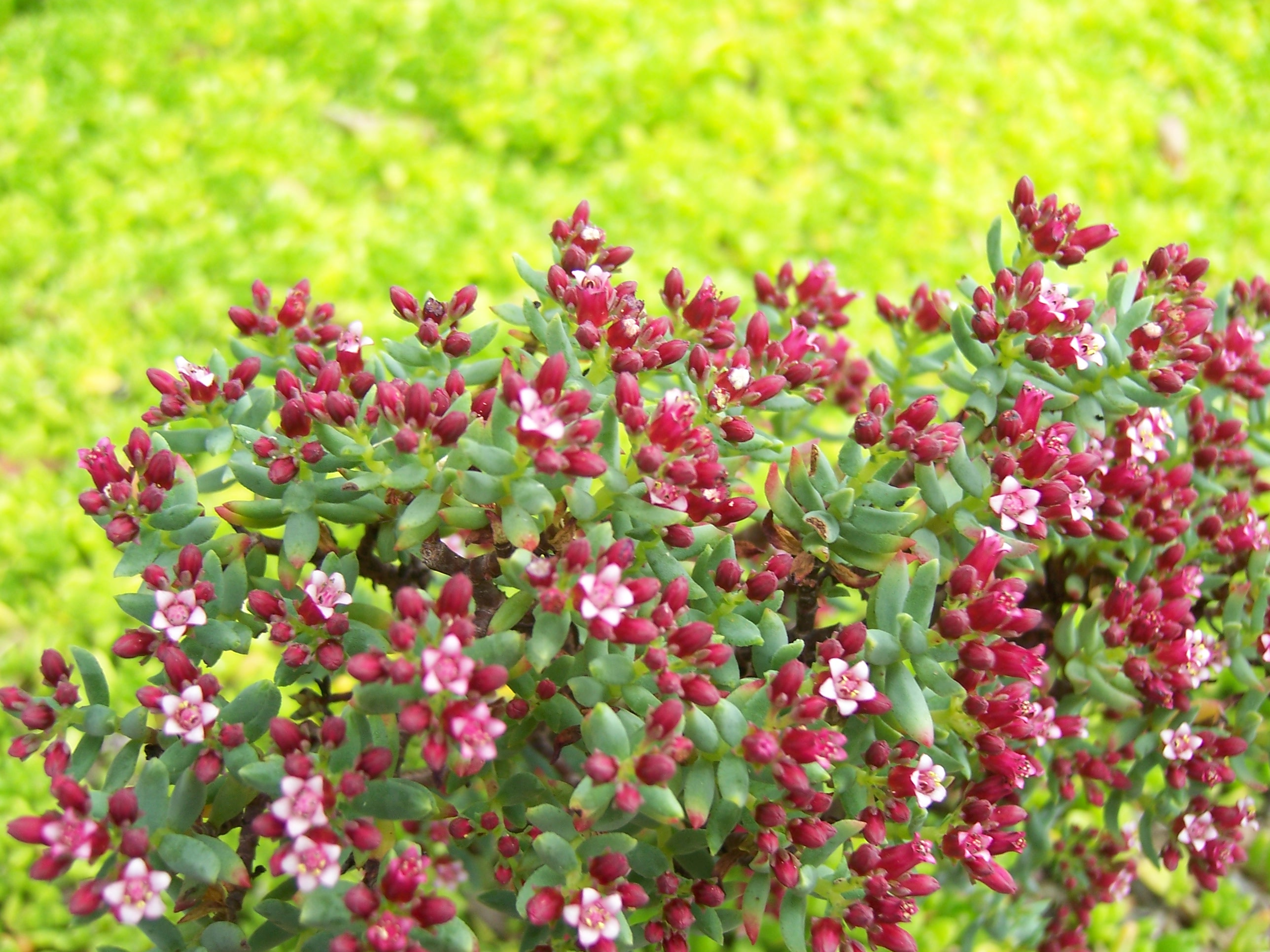

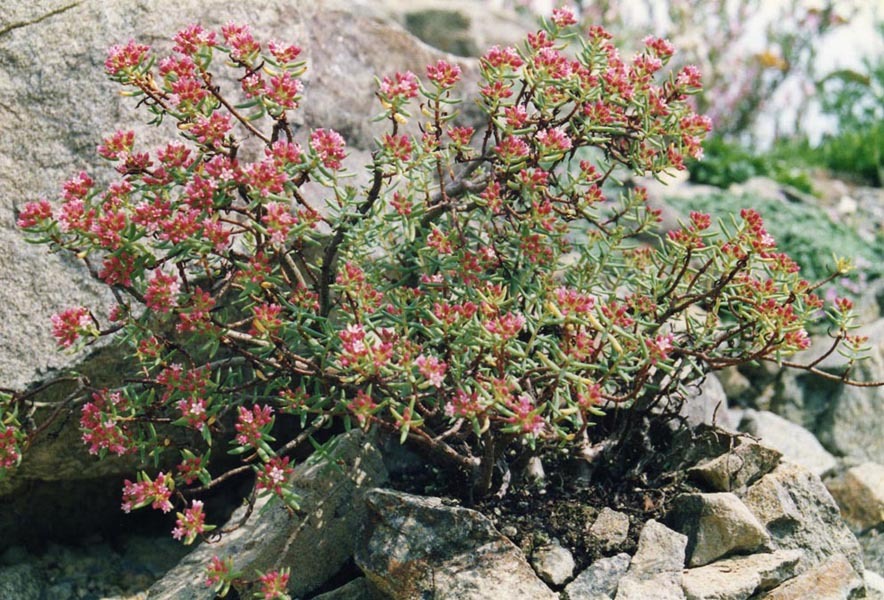
