= R331 (South Africa) =

Regional route in South Africa

Regional route R331
- R331 route map

Route information
- Length: 59.7 km (37.1 mi)

Location
- Country: South Africa

Highway system
- Numbered routes of South Africa
← R330	→ R332

The R331 is a Regional Route in South Africa that connects the R102 and N2 near Thornhill in the east with the R332 near Baviaanskloof Nature Reserve in the west via Hankey and Patensie.

== Route ==
From route's western origin at the R332 it heads east into Patensie. Leaving the town, it heads south-east, reaching Hankey, where it meets the R330's northern origin. It heads east-south-east out the town to intersect the N2 and then end immediately afterward at the R102.
