= Thornhill, Kouga =

Thornhill
- Location within Eastern Cape Location within South Africa
- Coordinates: 33.895°S 25.141°E
- Country: South Africa
- Province: Eastern Cape
- District: Sarah Baartman
- Municipality: Kouga

Area
  - Total: 1.26 km^{2} (0.49 sq mi)

Population (2011)
  - Total: 2,462
  - Density: 1,950/km^{2} (5,060/sq mi)

Racial makeup (2011)
  - Black African: 44.4%
  - Coloured: 53.0%
  - Indian/Asian: 0.1%
  - White: 1.8%
  - Other: 0.7%

First languages (2011)
  - Afrikaans: 58.1%
  - Xhosa: 37.1%
  - English: 1.8%
  - Other: 3.0%
- Time zone: UTC+2 (SAST)
- Postal code (street): 6375
- PO box: 6375
- Area code: 042

Thornhill is a town in Kouga Local Municipality under the Sarah Baartman District Municipality in the Eastern Cape province of South Africa.

== Fires ==
In 2017 a series of uncontrolled fires in the area around Thornhill in the Kouga Municipality of the Eastern Cape province of South Africa. The fires caused extensive damage to farmland and infrastructure in the region.

=== Timeline ===
- The fires began spreading significantly in early June 2017.
- The affected period is documented from about 7 June to 23 June in the Longmore/Thornhill area.
- On 7 June, approximately 250 residents were evacuated to the Katriena Felix Community Hall.
- On 9 June the MTO Group along with the Sarah Baartman West Fire Association released a media statement that the fire had been anchored which meant it was contained but not at a hundred percent.
- On the afternoon of the 10 June at approximately 13:15 sudden high wind speeds of up to roughly 110 km/h caused the exiting fires to flare up and spread rapidly.
- Evacuation orders were allegedly sent out during this same period from the authorities to warn the people in path of the fire to evacuate. This evacuation order was to include those residing on the R331.
- At roughly 14:45 it is alleged that these evacuation orders were not received by the residents who lived in the area and the lack of proper evacuation orders resulted in an elderly couple becoming trapped on their farm.
- On the same day it was confirmed that one of the trapped individuals a 72-year- old woman, Myrna van der Riet was declared deceased after becoming trapped by the flames on their farm 'Langlaagte".
- On 11 June it was confirmed that her 73-year-old husband, Walter van der Riet had died from burns and injuries sustained during the fire.
- On 12 June the municipal council declared a state of local disaster in the Kouga municipality.
