= St Francis Bay =

St Francis Bay St Francisbaai
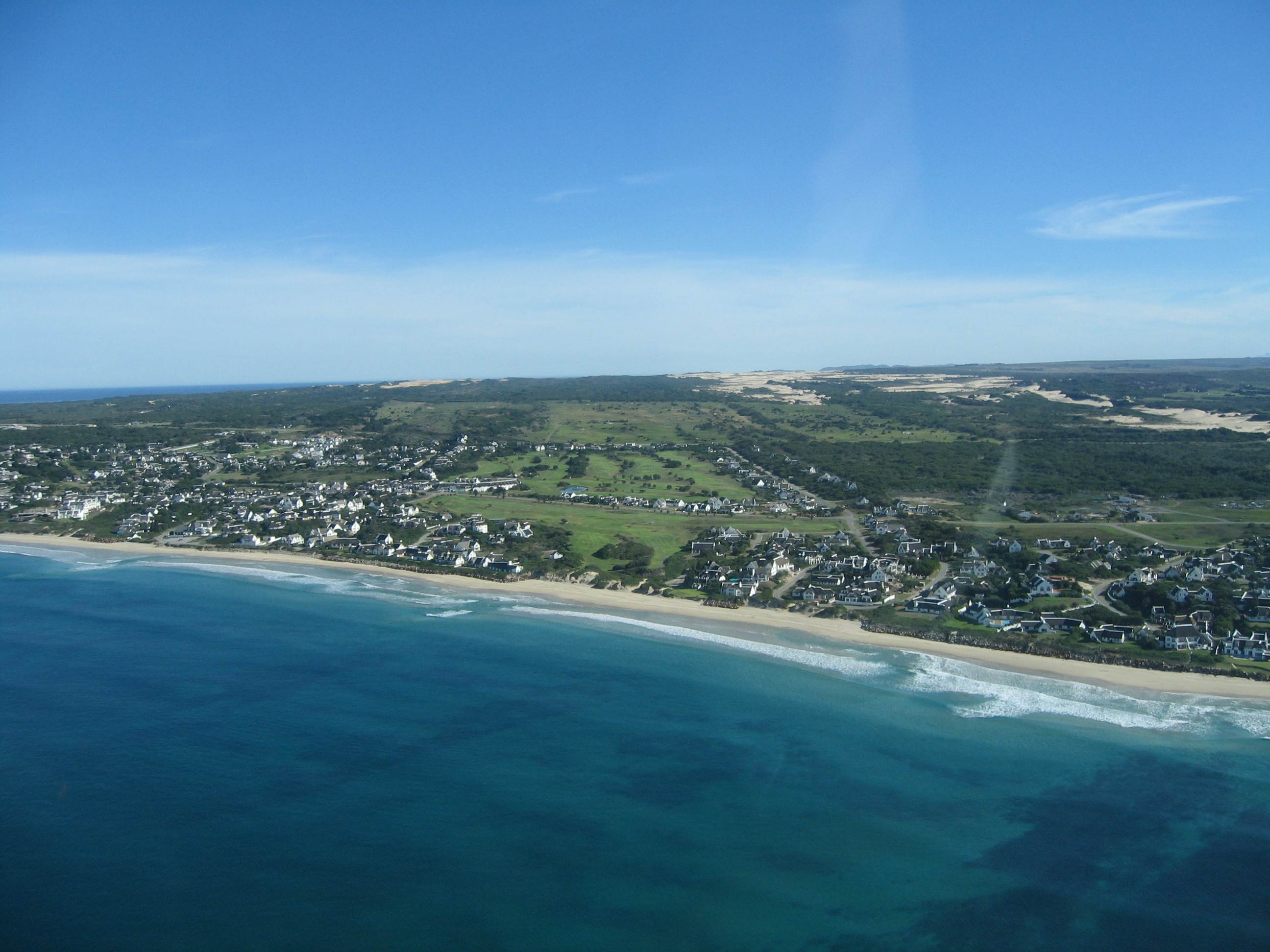
- Aerial photo of St Francis Bay

- Location within Eastern Cape Location within South Africa Location within Africa
- Coordinates: 34.162°S 24.830°E
- Country: South Africa
- Province: Eastern Cape
- District: Sarah Baartman
- Municipality: Kouga

Government
  - Councillor: Lorraine Maree (DA)

Area
  - Total: 10.04 km^{2} (3.88 sq mi)

Population (2011)
  - Total: 4,933
  - Density: 491.3/km^{2} (1,273/sq mi)

Racial makeup (2011)
  - Black African: 51.2%
  - Coloured: 21.7%
  - Indian/Asian: 0.2%
  - White: 26.1%
  - Other: 0.8%

First languages (2011)
  - Xhosa: 39.4%
  - Afrikaans: 32.7%
  - English: 21.7%
  - Zulu: 1.2%
  - Other: 4.9%
- Time zone: UTC+2 (SAST)
- Postal code (street): 6312
- PO box: 6312

St Francis Bay (Afrikaans: St Francisbaai) is a holiday town in Sarah Baartman District Municipality in the Eastern Cape province of South Africa, roughly one hour’s drive from Gqeberha.

== History ==
=== Early history ===
The town's earliest European history of the area can be traced back to 1488 when Bartolomeu Dias named the bay Golfo dos Pastores, although the bay was also known as Golfo dos Vaqueiros.

The town's current name is derived from the Portuguese Bahia de Sâo Francisco given in 1575 by Manuel Perestrelo to what is today St Francis Bay and Jeffreys Bay.

=== Recent History ===
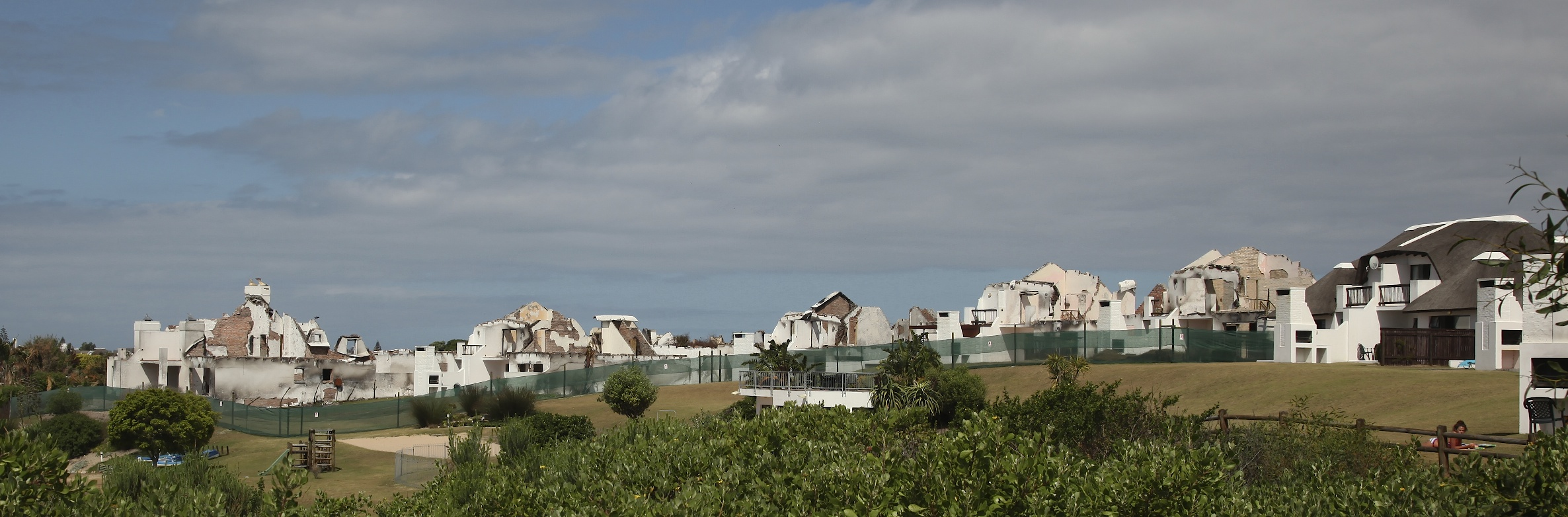
Fire damaged buildings

On 11 November 2012 a fire destroyed 76 homes in St Francis Bay, almost all of them thatched roofed.

== Architecture ==
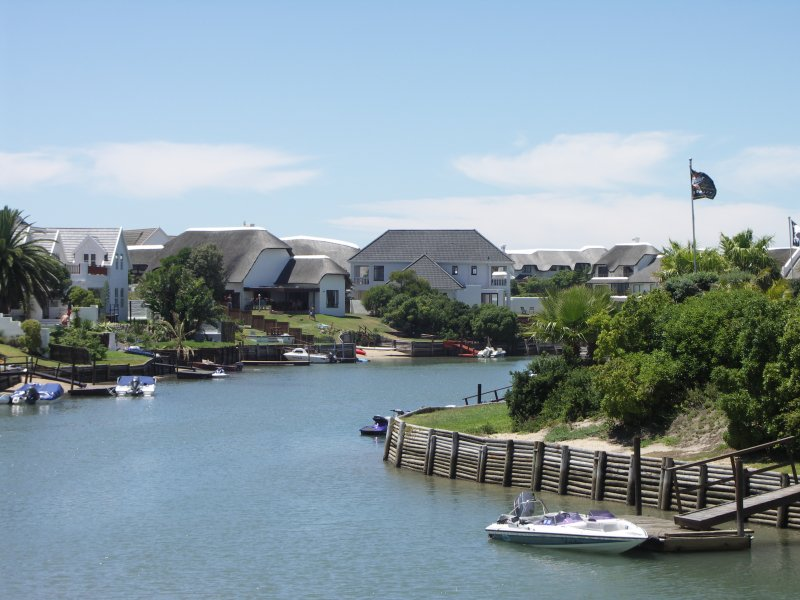
The canals of St Francis Bay.

The building style of the village section of St Francis Bay includes white painted houses with black roofs (mostly thatch) on the canals or around the golf course, or a Mediterranean building style in Santareme and Port St Francis. The Kromme River is navigable for 14 km upstream, and is linked to the St Francis canal system.

== Tourism ==
Whales can be spotted in the Bay from May to late October and dolphins can be seen daily on their way back and forth between the bays of Cape St Francis and Jeffrey’s Bay. The Cape clawless otter is present in the waves and rock pools around Port St Francis and at Otters Landing. Bird life is abundant with over 200 species recorded in the area including the rare African oystercatcher and fish eagle.

Port St Francis includes a commercial and recreational harbour, built to host the squid industry freezing vessels, as well as a small harbour resort village. It lies in a sheltered nook of the bay and provides safe anchorage for the boats, pleasure craft, and oceangoing yachts. St Francis Field is an airpark close to the Port that caters for those who wish to fly in.

Cape St Francis, a rustic fishing village, sits adjacent to St Francis Bay and is popular for surfing at Seal Point, a stretch of beach in St Francis Bay, and the historic lighthouse, built in 1878. Walking trails winding along the rocky coast, through the Irma Booysen Floral Reserve, and along the Cape St Francis point, links it to the village of St Francis Bay.

Cape St Francis is 8 km from Thyspunt, which was a preferred site for South Africa's next nuclear power station. A township known as Sea Visa is where most of the black Africans and coloured people live.

== Climate ==
Climate data for Cape St. Francis (1991–2020 normals, extremes 1959–2001)
Month	Jan	Feb	Mar	Apr	May	Jun	Jul	Aug	Sep	Oct	Nov	Dec	Year
Record high °C (°F)	31.2 (88.2)	31.4 (88.5)	31.0 (87.8)	30.7 (87.3)	32.0 (89.6)	30.5 (86.9)	30.7 (87.3)	30.0 (86.0)	26.1 (79.0)	27.7 (81.9)	28.4 (83.1)	32.1 (89.8)	32.1 (89.8)
Mean daily maximum °C (°F)	22.8 (73.0)	22.9 (73.2)	21.1 (70.0)	19.5 (67.1)	19.3 (66.7)	19.0 (66.2)	18.7 (65.7)	17.9 (64.2)	17.9 (64.2)	18.6 (65.5)	20.3 (68.5)	21.8 (71.2)	20.0 (68.0)
Daily mean °C (°F)	20.2 (68.4)	20.4 (68.7)	18.9 (66.0)	17.1 (62.8)	16.4 (61.5)	15.4 (59.7)	15.0 (59.0)	14.9 (58.8)	15.3 (59.5)	16.3 (61.3)	17.9 (64.2)	19.3 (66.7)	17.3 (63.1)
Mean daily minimum °C (°F)	17.7 (63.9)	18.0 (64.4)	16.7 (62.1)	14.6 (58.3)	13.5 (56.3)	11.8 (53.2)	11.2 (52.2)	11.9 (53.4)	12.7 (54.9)	14.0 (57.2)	15.6 (60.1)	16.9 (62.4)	14.6 (58.2)
Record low °C (°F)	10.4 (50.7)	9.7 (49.5)	10.2 (50.4)	4.8 (40.6)	5.6 (42.1)	3.6 (38.5)	3.0 (37.4)	4.5 (40.1)	4.8 (40.6)	6.1 (43.0)	8.2 (46.8)	10.2 (50.4)	3.0 (37.4)
Average precipitation mm (inches)	28.8 (1.13)	34.2 (1.35)	45.3 (1.78)	51.8 (2.04)	66.4 (2.61)	69.2 (2.72)	73.2 (2.88)	70.3 (2.77)	62.1 (2.44)	58.9 (2.32)	49.7 (1.96)	34.0 (1.34)	643.9 (25.34)
Average precipitation days (≥ 0.25 mm)	5.5	5.7	7.3	6.6	7.6	7.5	8.3	8.8	8.6	8.6	7.2	6.2	87.9
Source: Starlings Roost Weather (precipitation 1880–2001)
