= Kouga Local Municipality =

Kouga
- Local municipality
- Seal

- Location in the Eastern Cape
- Coordinates: 34°02′S 24°46′E
- Country: South Africa
- Province: Eastern Cape
- District: Sarah Baartman
- Seat: Jeffreys Bay
- Wards: 15

Government
  - Type: Municipal council
  - Mayor: Hattingh Bornman (DA)

Area
  - Total: 2,670 km^{2} (1,030 sq mi)

Population (2022)
  - Total: 107,041
  - Density: 40.1/km^{2} (104/sq mi)

Racial makeup (2022)
  - Black African: 32.6%
  - Coloured: 35.2%
  - Indian/Asian: 0.3%
  - White: 29.9%

First languages (2011)
  - Afrikaans: 59.4%
  - Xhosa: 30.5%
  - English: 6.5%
  - Other: 3.6%
- Time zone: UTC+2 (SAST)
- Municipal code: EC108

Kouga Municipality (Afrikaans: Kouga Munisipaliteit; Xhosa: uMasipala wase Kouga) is a local municipality in the Eastern Cape of South Africa, approximately 80 km west of Gqebera. It forms part of the Sarah Baartman District Municipality. Its territory includes the coastal zone between the Van Stadens River in the east and the Tsitsikamma River in the west, and stretches inland towards the Baviaanskloof Mountains in the north.

Regional access to the area is obtained via the N2 National Route from Gqebera to Cape Town. It is often regarded as the cleanest municipality in the Eastern Cape.

== Topography and climate ==
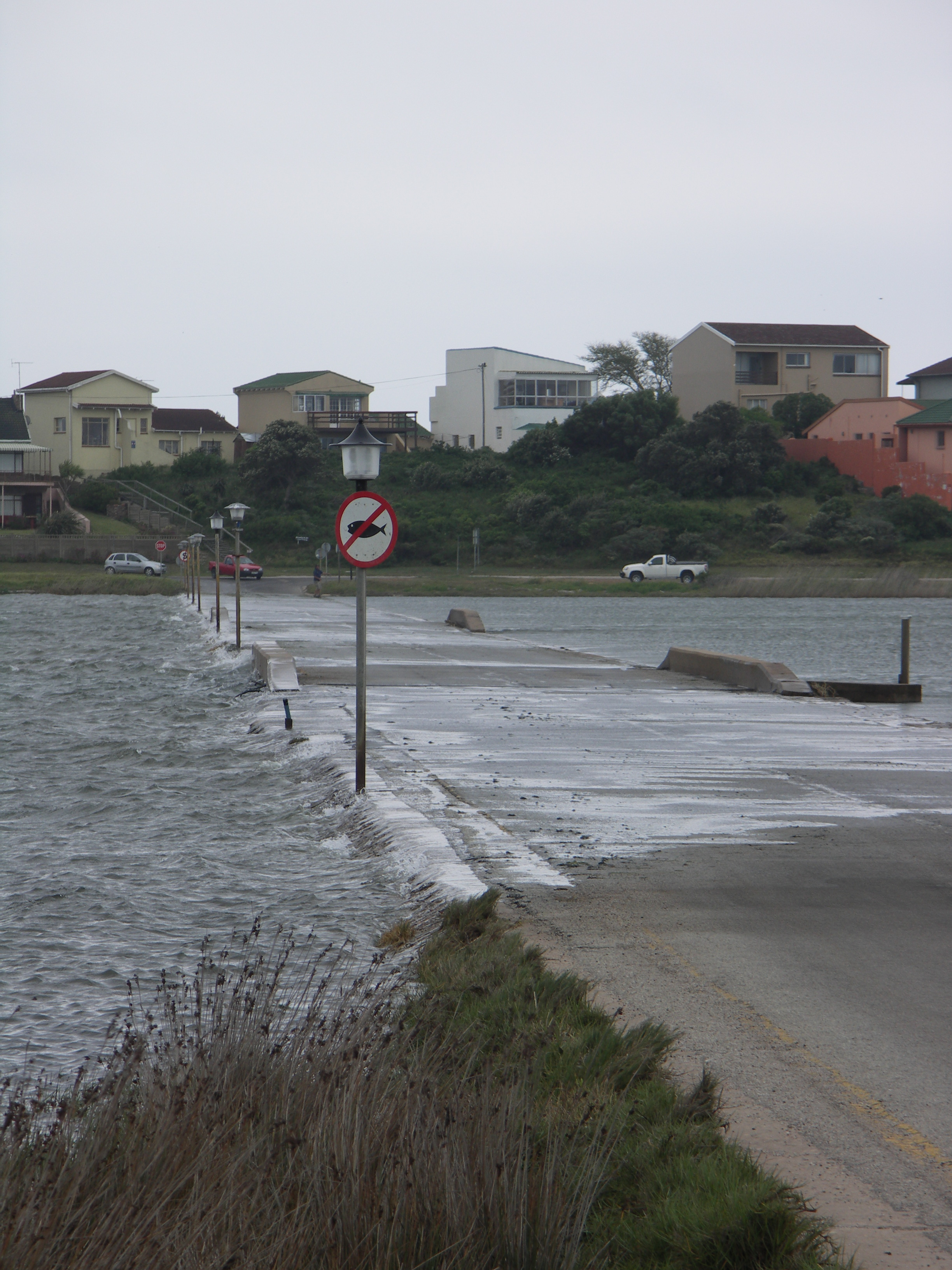
Causeway over the Seekoei River between Aston Bay and Paradise Beach

The municipality is characterised by 3 main topographical regions:

- The coastal region stretches from the Van Stadens River in the east through the Tsitsikamma River in the west. This zone includes the towns of Jeffreys Bay, St Francis Bay, and Oyster Bay. The coast serves as a major national and regional tourism attraction.
- The Gamtoos River Valley is characterised by wide, fertile flood plains associated with low-lying land, with steep less-fertile slopes flanking the Valley. The towns of Hankey and Patensie, Loerie and Thornhill are focal points of this high-potential agricultural region.
- The Humansdorp and Kruisfontein area is characterised by moderate slopes in the south, with steeper slopes towards the north and northwest.

The four main rivers in the area – the Kromme, Seekoei, Kabeljouws and Gamtoos – are all tidal rivers. The Kromme River and Gamtoos River are significant sources of water supply. Ground water forms another major component of domestic water supply for towns in the Kouga region, especially Humansdorp, Jeffreys Bay, St Francis Bay, Cape St Francis and Oyster Bay. Aquifers are also utilised in the agricultural sector for irrigation of pastures.

There are numerous areas of wetland adjacent to the region's rivers and on the coastal platform. These wetlands are extremely sensitive to disturbances such as agricultural activities and development. The wetlands accommodate high species diversity, and fulfil natural water purification and flood retention roles.

The climate of the Kouga region is subtropical, which makes the area conducive to a range of outdoor activities and various types of agricultural production. Rainfall varies between 650 mm per year (St Francis Bay area) to 400 mm (Gamtoos River Valley). The area is generally described as windy.

== Towns and settlements ==
More than 70% of the population of the Kouga region lives in urban areas. Humansdorp, with over 24,000 residents, has an established infrastructure and acts as a regional service centre, supplying the surrounding agricultural communities and the coastal towns with commodities and services. Commercial and industrial activities of the region are centred in Humansdorp.

The coastal towns of Jeffreys Bay, St Francis Bay, Cape St Francis and Oyster Bay are well-established tourist destinations. Jeffreys Bay has a population of over 40,000 with an annual population growth rate of 2.5% or higher, making it one of the fastest-growing towns in South Africa.

The urban areas of Hankey and Patensie, situated in the Gamtoos River Valley, provide important services to the surrounding high-density agriculture industry.

Other settlements in the Kouga region include: Andrieskraal, Aston Bay, Centerton, Gamtoos Mouth, Kruisfontein, Kwanomzamo, Loerie, Ocean View, Oyster Bay, Paradise Beach, Pellsrus, Ramaphoza Village, Sea Vista, Thornhill, Tokyo Sexwale, Umzamowethu and Weston.

== Politics ==
The municipal council consists of thirty members elected by mixed-member proportional representation. Fifteen councillors are elected by first-past-the-post voting in fifteen wards, while the remaining fifteen are chosen from party lists so that the total number of party representatives is proportional to the number of votes received.

=== History ===
Kouga Local Municipality was formed at the time of the municipal elections in December 2000, by the merger of the earlier councils of Humansdorp, Jeffrey's Bay, Hankey, Oyster Bay, Patensie and St Francis Bay. The Democratic Alliance (DA), at the time a joint project of the New National Party (NNP) and the Democratic Party (DP), took power after the first local elections.

The NNP withdrew from the DA in 2001 to instead align with its old rival, the African National Congress (ANC). During the floor crossing period in 2002, one DA councillor defected to the NNP, allowing an ANC-NNP coalition to take over governance of the municipality. Kouga remained under ANC control for the next 14 years, with the party winning a comfortable victory in 2006 and narrowly retaining power after a closely fought election in 2011.

In the election of 3 August 2016, however, the DA won a majority of seventeen seats on the council, defeating the ANC, which previously controlled the council. Elza van Lingen became the new mayor of the municipality. She died in April 2018, after which speaker Horatio Hendricks took over as mayor.

Hendricks was re-elected as mayor following the 2021 municipal elections. He resigned from office in June 2023 and deputy mayor Hattingh Bornman was elected to succeed him.

In the election of 4 November 2026, the Democratic Alliance (DA) won a majority of 18 seats.

The following table shows the results of the 2026 municipal election.

Party	Ward			List			Total seats
Party	Votes	%	Seats	Votes	%	Seats	Total seats
Democratic Alliance	23,884	58.53	11	23,908	58.57	7	18
African National Congress	10,110	24.78	4	10,095	24.73	4	8
Patriotic Alliance	2,966	7.27	0	2,937	7.20	2	2
Freedom Front Plus	1,778	4.36	0	1,779	4.36	1	1
People's Movement for Change	617	1.51	0	630	1.54	1	1
9 other parties	1,451	3.56	0	1,469	3.60	0	0
Total	40,806	100.00	15	40,818	100.00	15	30
Valid votes	40,806	99.26		40,818	99.16		
Invalid/blank votes	305	0.74		344	0.84		
Total votes	41,111	100.00		41,162	100.00		
Registered voters/turnout	68,420	60.09		68,420	60.16		

== Main places ==
The 2001 census divided the municipality into the following main places:

Place	Code	Area (km^{2})	Population	Most spoken language
Aston Bay	20801	2.12	918	Afrikaans
Cape St Francis	20802	2.51	165	Afrikaans
Hankey	20803	20.24	8,281	Afrikaans
Humansdorp	20804	35.94	15,338	Afrikaans
Jeffreys Bay	20805	11.25	14,775	Afrikaans
KwaNomzamo	20807	1.21	6,553	Xhosa
Loerie	20808	0.42	1,824	Afrikaans
Oyster Bay	20809	1.34	348	Afrikaans
Paradise Beach	20810	3.79	492	Afrikaans
Patensie	20811	6.68	4,271	Afrikaans
St Francis Bay	20812	7.34	2,195	Afrikaans
Sunnyside	20813	0.14	208	Afrikaans
Thornhill	20814	1.46	1,294	Afrikaans
Weston	20815	0.68	1,540	Xhosa
Remainder of the municipality	20806	2,322.26	12,489	Afrikaans
