= Cape St. Francis =

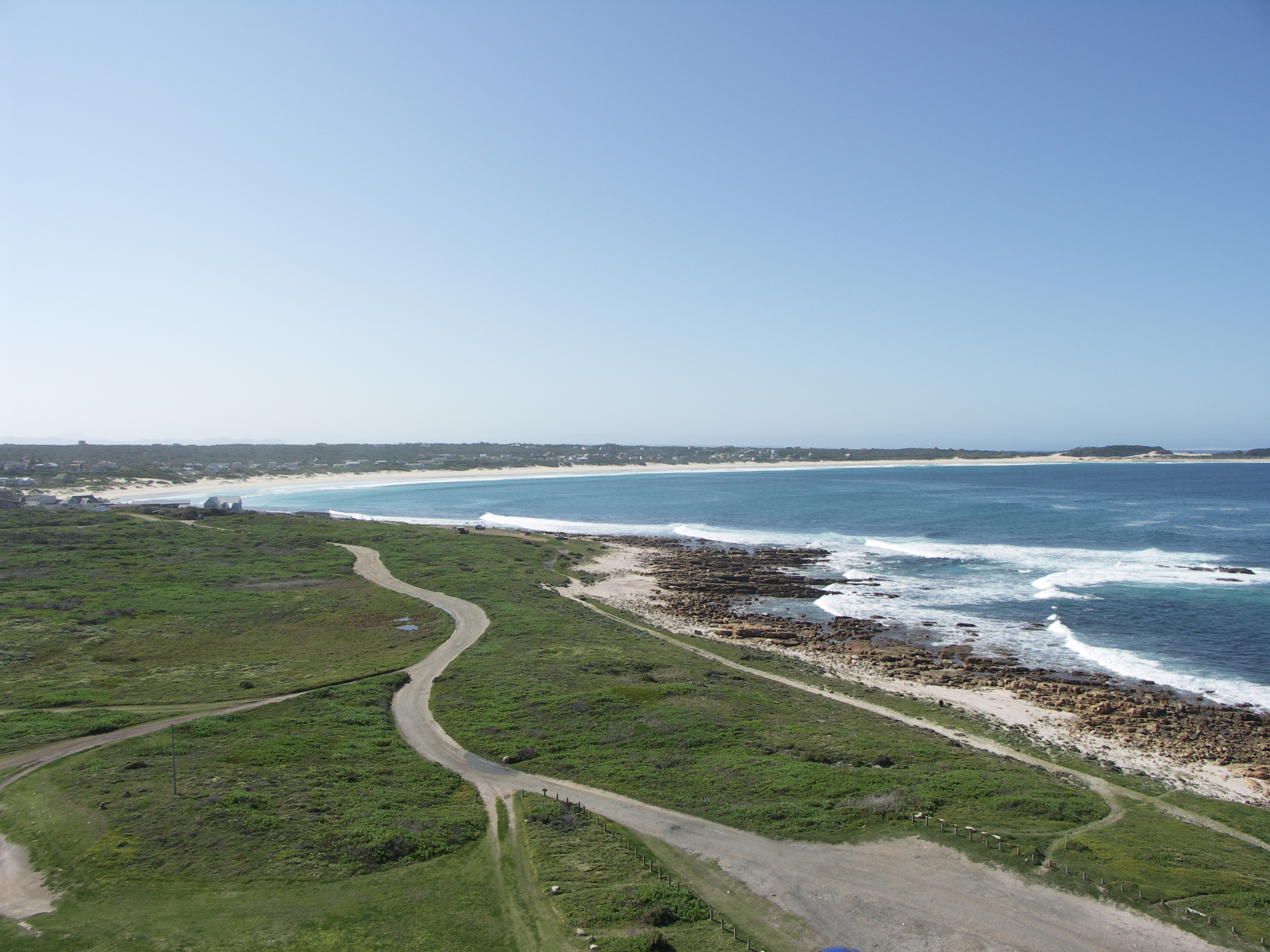
- View of Cape St. Francis from the Seal Point Lighthouse

- Location within Eastern Cape Location within South Africa
- Coordinates: 34°11′49″S 24°50′17″E
- Country: South Africa
- Province: Eastern Cape
- District: Sarah Baartman
- Municipality: Kouga

Area
  - Total: 4.38 km^{2} (1.69 sq mi)

Population (2011)
  - Total: 342
  - Density: 78.1/km^{2} (202/sq mi)

Racial makeup (2011)
  - Black African: 3.5%
  - Coloured: 1.8%
  - White: 94.7%

First languages (2011)
  - English: 55.6%
  - Afrikaans: 42.1%
  - Xhosa: 1.8%
  - Other: 0.6%
- Time zone: UTC+2 (SAST)

Cape St. Francis (Afrikaans: Kaap St Francis) is a village in South Africa, situated on a headland in the Eastern Cape Province. It is popular for its clean beaches and as a surfing location.

The village is home to the Seal Point Lighthouse.

The Irma Booysen Floral Reserve is home to many species of flowers and plants.

Cape St. Francis is now known as one of the best surfing locations. Given its geological location, it is susceptible to swell year round from large low pressure systems that form between Antarctica and the southern tip of Africa.

It is also featured in the 1966 surf documentary film 'The Endless Summer' and the 2014 film The Perfect Wave, starring Scott Eastwood.

Bartolomeu Dias originally named the cape Ponta das Queimadas because of the fires he spotted there while sailing past.

== See also ==
- St. Francis Bay
- Venpet–Venoil collision
