= Jeffreys Bay =

Town in Eastern Cape, South Africa

Jeffreys Bay Jeffreysbaai
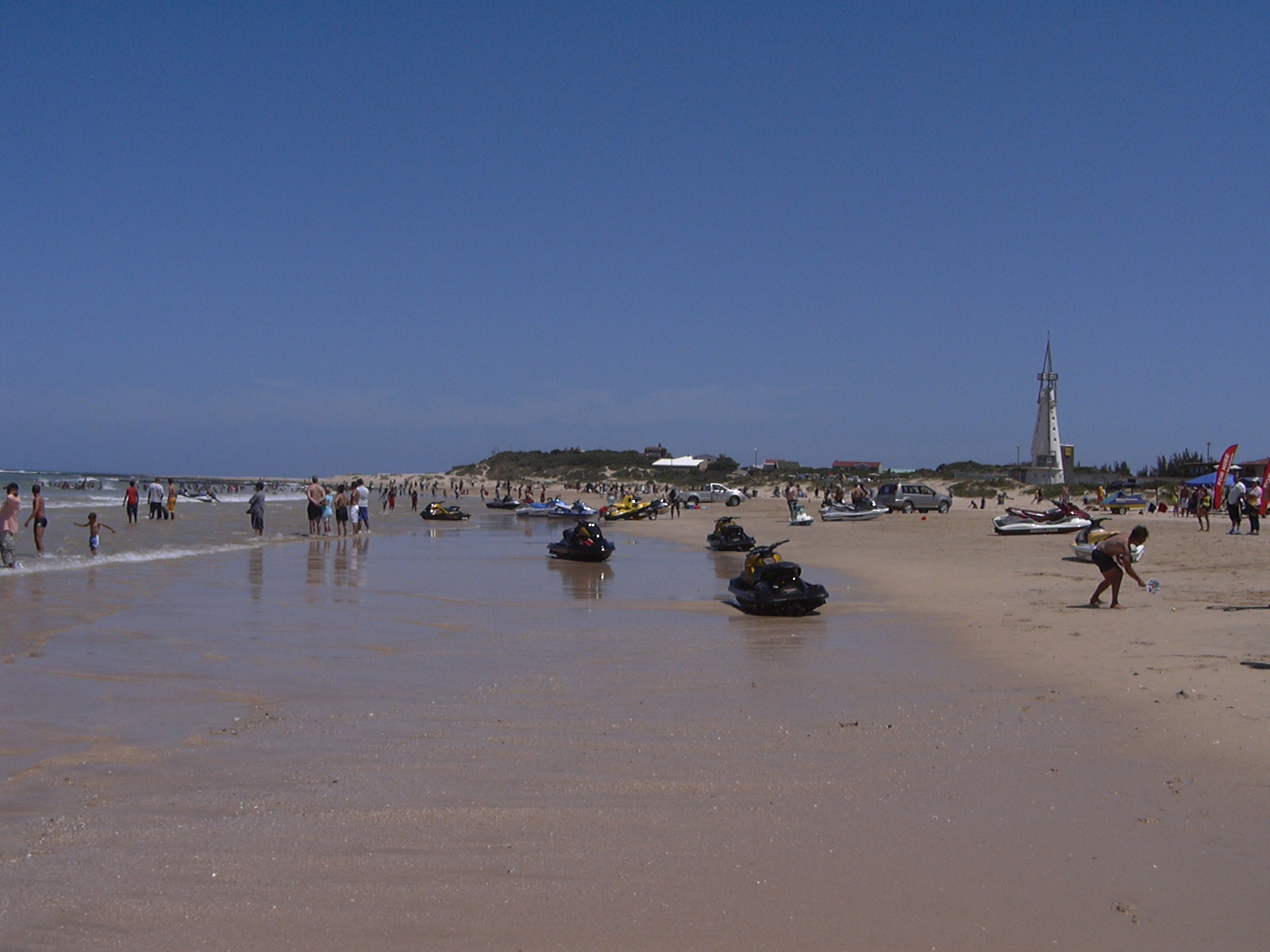
- Jeffreys Bay Beach

- Location within Eastern Cape Location within South Africa Location within Africa
- Coordinates: 34°2′S 24°55′E
- Country: South Africa
- Province: Eastern Cape
- District: Sarah Baartman
- Municipality: Kouga

Area
  - Total: 20.79 km^{2} (8.03 sq mi)

Population (2011)
  - Total: 27,107
  - Density: 1,304/km^{2} (3,377/sq mi)

Racial makeup (2011)
  - Black African: 37.5%
  - Coloured: 22.7%
  - Indian/Asian: 0.2%
  - White: 38.9%
  - Other: 0.7%

First languages (2011)
  - Afrikaans: 54.4%
  - Xhosa: 28.8%
  - English: 11.8%
  - Other: 5.0%
- Time zone: UTC+2 (SAST)
- Postal code (street): 6330
- PO box: 6330
- Area code: +27 (0)42

Jeffreys Bay (Afrikaans: Jeffreysbaai, nicknamed J-bay) is a town of 27,107 inhabitants as of the 2011 census in the Eastern Cape province of South Africa. It is the seat of the Kouga municipality and is famous amongst surfers as a surf capital due to the right-hand point break at Supertubes Beach. The town is situated just off the N2 Highway, about 75 kilometres southwest of Port Elizabeth.

== History ==
Jeffreys Bay is named after the senior partner of the firm Jeffrey & Glendinnings who opened a store in 1849 on the location where the town is today. Jeffrey is believed to be the first person to have settled there.

In the late 1960s and early 1970s, Jeffreys Bay was known as a hippie hangout, where the now-burgeoning surf community originated. Jeffreys Bay has had extensive growth over the past few years and is one of the fastest expanding urban areas in the country. Jeffreys Bay as a surfing destination was made famous by Bruce Brown's movie "The Endless Summer".

== Demographics ==
Xhosa, Afrikaans and English are the three most spoken languages.

Jeffreys Bay is a constituent part of the Kouga Local Municipality of the Sarah Baartman District in the Eastern Cape Province.

== Sport ==
=== Surfing ===
Jeffreys Bay is one of the five most famous surfing destinations in the world and hosts the annual World Surf League (WSL) surfing event at Super Tubes during July. Spectators and professional surfers from all over the world flock to this event. In 2015, Mick Fanning had an encounter with a shark two minutes into the J-Bay Open finals in Jeffreys Bay. Fanning was in the water with Julian Wilson during the final of the J-Bay Open 2015 when what is suspected to be a great white shark became entangled in his surfboard leash. Fanning punched the shark and tried to wedge his board between the shark and his body, and he emerged from the attack physically unharmed.

The Jeffreys Bay Surf Break

A very long, fast, tubing right hand point break breaks along the west side of the bay. The break is regarded as one of the best right hand point breaks in the entire world, in both consistency and quality, in season. It has been divided up into several sections, including, from the top of the point, Kitchen Windows, Magna tubes, Boneyards, Supertubes, Impossibles, Tubes, the Point, and Albatross. "Supertubes", which itself breaks for about 300m or more, is regarded as the best part of the wave. On rare occasions (large wave sizes, wide-breaking waves, and even swells), Boneyards can link up all the way to the Point for a ride over one kilometre long. Optimal size is considered to be from about 4 to 10 feet (Hawaiian scale), or about 8 to 20 feet wave faces.

The initial discovery and promotion of the wave is curious. Another nearby right hand point wave at St. Francis Bay was first idolised and promoted in the surf movie The Endless Summer in the 1960s (although both Jeffreys Bay and St. Francis Bay were probably surfed much earlier). Surfers who travelled to the area soon stumbled upon the nearby Jeffreys Bay surf break, which was found to be not only a faster, more powerful, and hollower wave, but also much more consistent.

== Tourism ==
Jeffreys Bay is a popular tourist destination because of its surfing opportunities and the Blue Flag beach.

Jeffreys Bay is famous for abundant seashells, great seafood and calamari. The nearby Kabeljous, Seekoei and Krom River lagoons host numerous water birds, and are also ideal for watersports like canoeing, boardsailing, and fishing. Every year, migrating whales make their way to Hermanus and Witsand to give birth, and whales can be seen breaching almost every day during the season.

Just northeast of the town, on the Kabeljous River, lies the Kabeljous Nature Reserve. It is a walk-about reserve, well known to anglers for a diverse number of fish. The Kabeljous estuary is one of the best preserved estuaries in the Eastern Cape. The lagoon is home to waterfowl, herons, and a variety of waders. Nearby, the Seekoei River Nature Reserve lies between Aston Bay and Paradise Beach. The reserve lies on the estuary formed by the Seekoei and Swart rivers. The reserve is rich in birdlife with over 120 species of birds. The lagoon is also home to numerous red-knobbed coots and small antelope. There is also a circular hiking trail that takes about three hours to complete. The trail starts with a trip on a raft across the lagoon and runs through fynbos and subtropical vegetation.

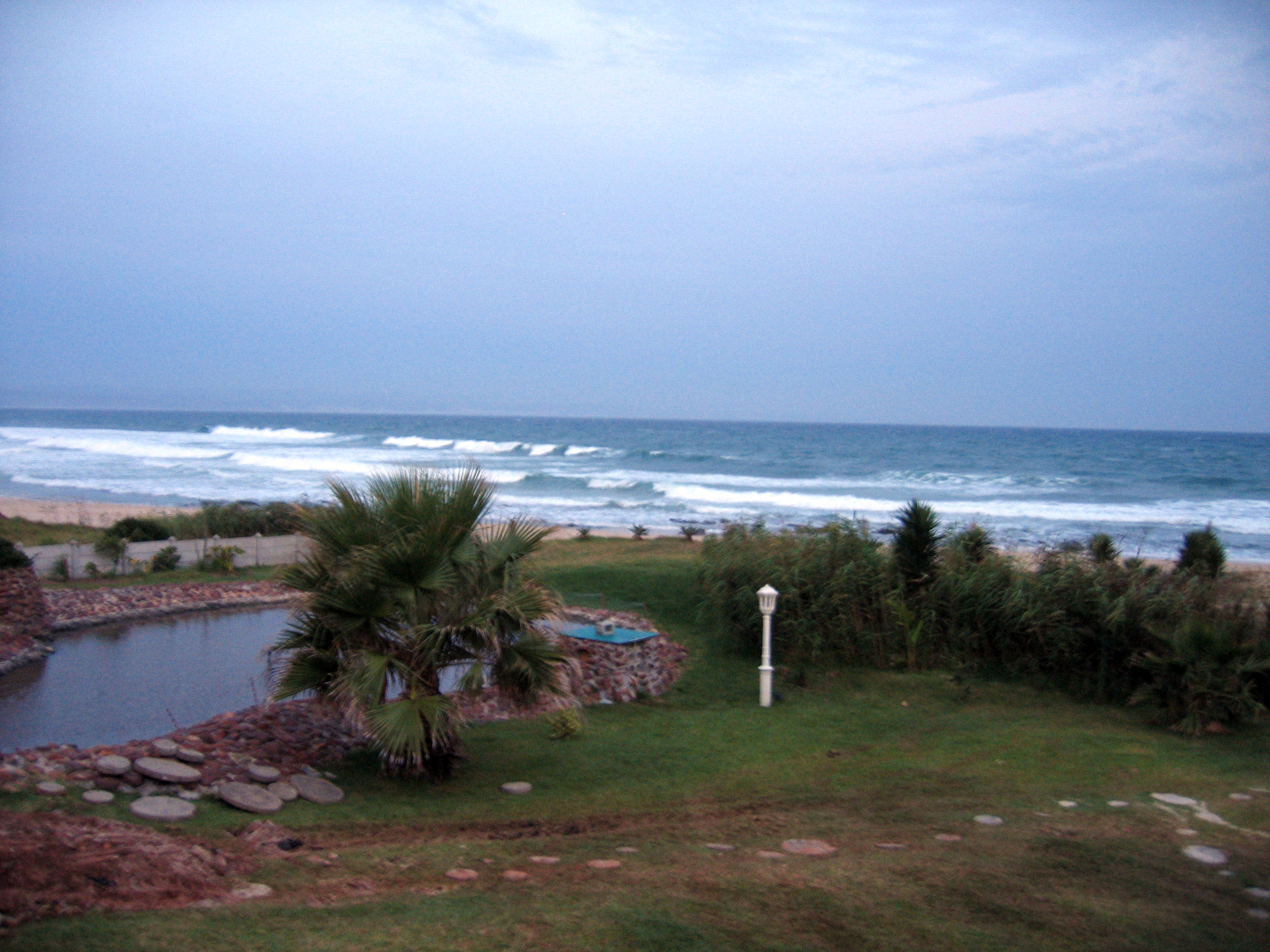
Jeffreys Bay beach view

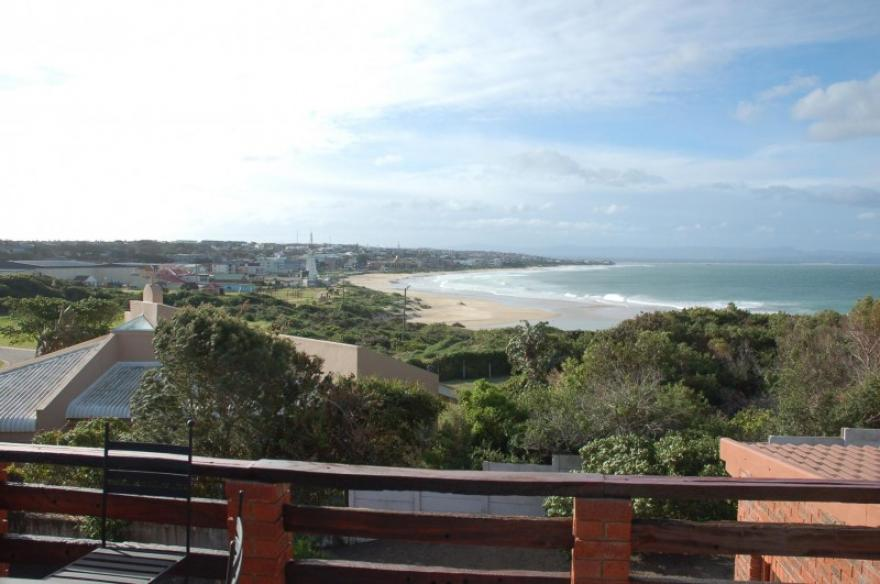
Jeffreys Bay beach view from the top of the Villa African Queen

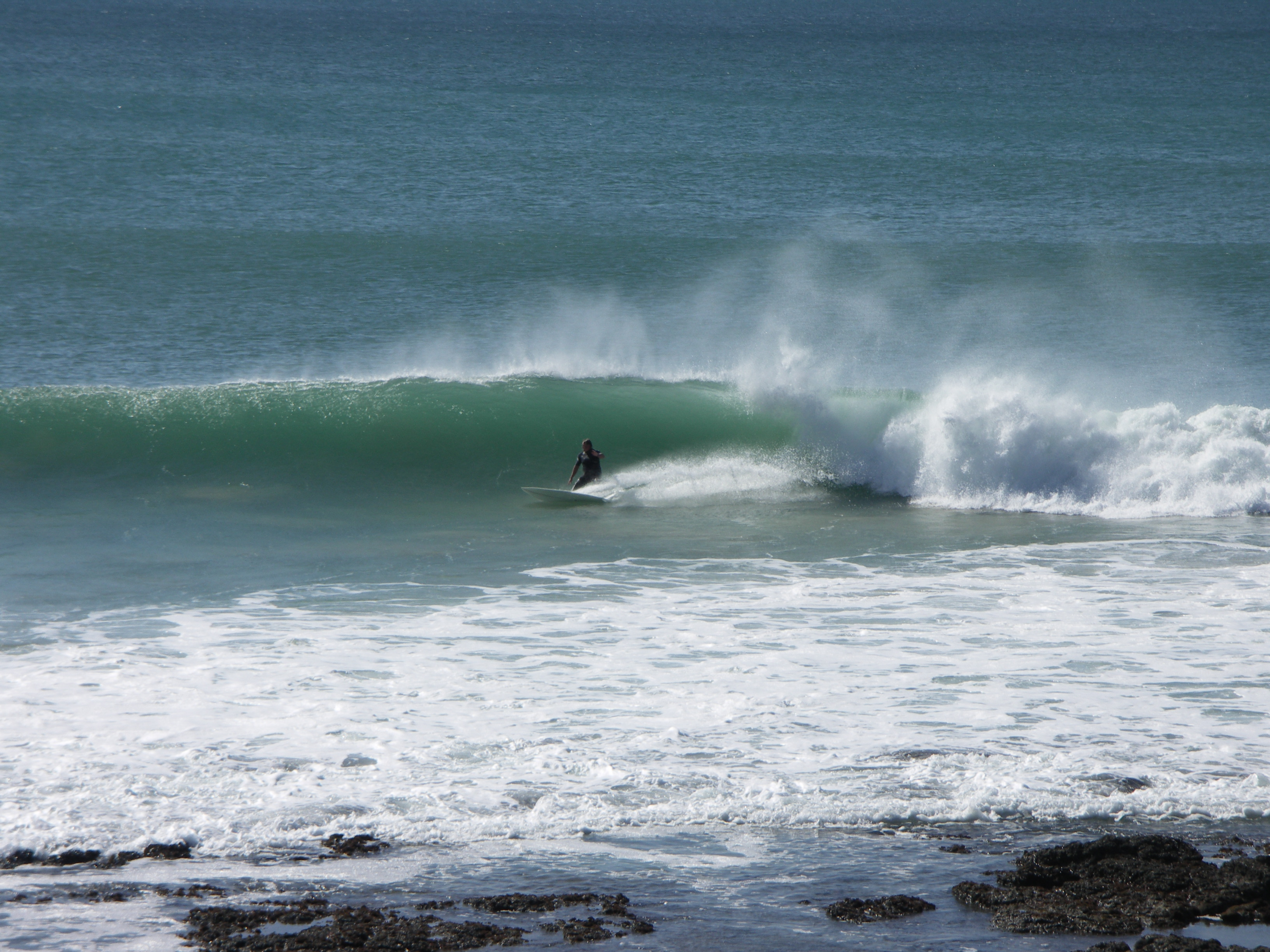
Surfing at Supertubes

== See also ==
- Surfing
