= Humansdorp =

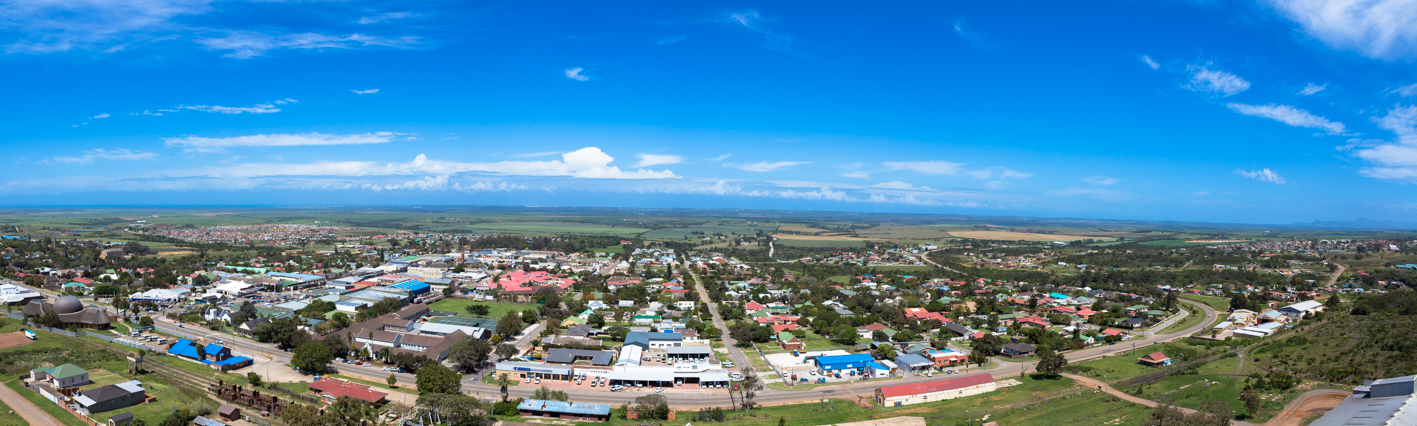
- View of Humansdorp

- Location within Eastern Cape Location within South Africa Location within Africa
- Coordinates: 34°02′S 24°46′E
- Country: South Africa
- Province: Eastern Cape
- District: Sarah Baartman
- Municipality: Kouga

Area
  - Total: 34.5 km^{2} (13.3 sq mi)
- Elevation: 120 m (390 ft)

Population (2011)
  - Total: 28,990
  - Density: 840/km^{2} (2,180/sq mi)

Racial makeup (2011)
  - Black African: 38.0%
  - Coloured: 54.3%
  - Indian/Asian: 0.3%
  - White: 6.7%
  - Other: 0.6%

First languages (2011)
  - Afrikaans: 63.1%
  - Xhosa: 31.4%
  - English: 2.6%
  - Other: 2.9%
- Time zone: UTC+2 (SAST)
- Postal code (street): 6300
- PO box: 6300
- Area code: 042

Humansdorp is a town in the Eastern Cape of South Africa, with a population of around 29,000 as of the 2011 Census. It is part of the Kouga Local Municipality of the Sarah Baartman District.

== History ==
The town is the centre of the district's light industry and farming. Humansdorp was founded in 1849, and was named after Johannes Jurie Human and Matthys Gerhardus Human, who were joint founders of the Dutch Reformed Church congregation there. The town's residential streets are lined with trees that were planted before the First World War by then-mayor Ambrose Saffery.

The Apple Express, part of the Avontuur Railway, passed through Humansdorp.

== See also ==
Jeffrey's Bay
