= Juwana Morto =

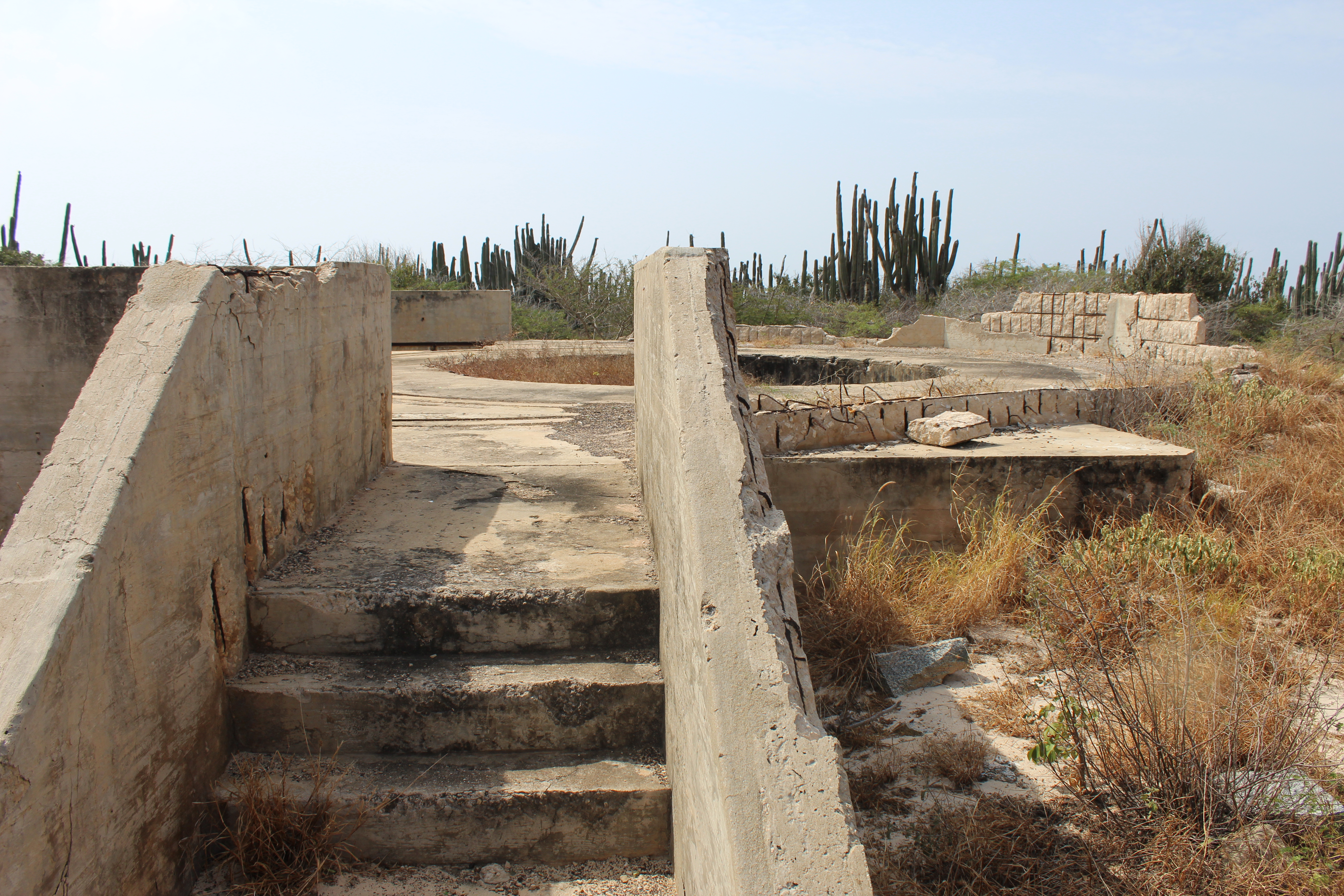
- Interactive map of the Juwana Morto area

General information
- Location: San Nicolaas, Aruba
- Coordinates: 12.44131°N 69.88932°W

Juwana Morto is former coastal artillery battery on the island of Aruba. It was constructed in 1940 to defend the nearby Lago Oil and Transport Company oil refinery and mounted three BL 7.5-inch Mk VI naval guns from British stocks. The battery was manned by local volunteer troops and never fired a shot in anger, even when the refinery came under German attack in 1940. The battery was abandoned after the war and the command bunker is a protected site.

== Construction ==
The battery was constructed within the district of San Nicolaas, in the south of the island after the fall of Holland in May 1940 to the German offensive. The battery was intended to defend the nearby Lago Oil and Transport Company oil refinery from any German attack. It comprised three gun emplacements and a command bunker located on a straight line and spaced at approximately 50 metres (160 ft) intervals. The command bunker comprised a ground floor with control room and communications room and a first floor with vision slit overlooking the refinery. The roof was also accessible by a concrete flight of stairs.

The three gun positions comprised concrete and steel foundations. The guns were housed in armoured mountings of British origin. The three BL 7.5-inch Mk VI naval guns were from a batch of seven sold to the Dutch by the British. Most came from the heavy cruiser Effingham which had received more modern weapons during a 1938 refit, though one of this batch was formerly used by the gunnery school at HM Dockyard, Devonport. The guns were first test fired at the battery on 17 May 1940.

The guns could rotate full circle and had a range of 18.5 kilometres (11.5 mi). They were manned by volunteer troops from Aruba who nicknamed the cannon Betsy, Jopie and Beppie.

== Service and later history ==
The guns at Juwana Morto never fired a shot in anger, even when German submarines attacked shipping and shelled the refinery in a 16 February 1942 attack. Most of the buildings at the battery have been demolished, and only the foundation remains. The gun positions are still visible amid overgrown vegetation. The remains of the command post are legally protected and publicly accessible. The Aruba Monuments Fund considers the site, when combined with the Sero Colorado battery, constructed by US forces, to be the island's most important military heritage.
