= HMS Hawkins =

British Hawkins-class heavy cruiser

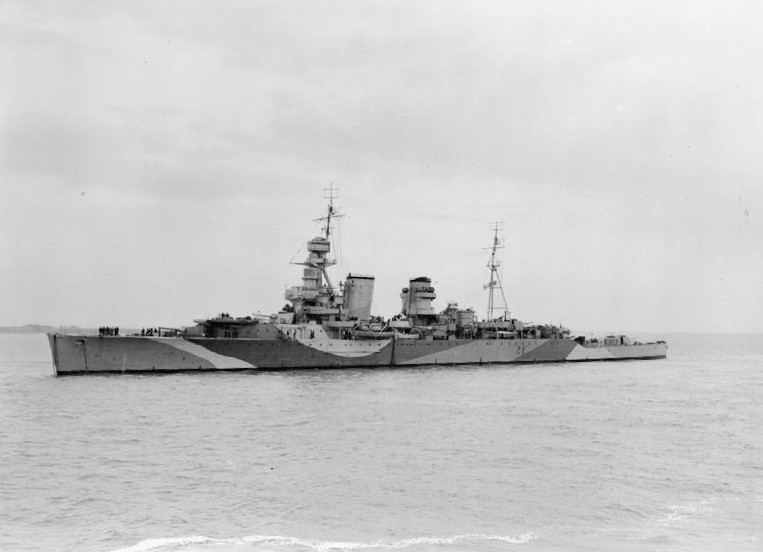
- Hawkins, 23 May 1942

History

United Kingdom
- Name: Hawkins
- Namesake: Admiral Sir John Hawkins
- Ordered: December 1915
- Builder: Chatham Dockyard
- Laid down: 3 June 1916
- Launched: 1 October 1917
- Commissioned: 23 July 1919
- Out of service: May 1945
- Identification: Pennant number: 8A (1919); 86 (1920); I86 (1938); D86 (1940)
- Fate: Sold for scrap, 26 August 1947

General characteristics (as built)
- Class & type: Hawkins-class heavy cruiser
- Displacement: 9,800 long tons (10,000 t) (standard); 12,110 long tons (12,300 t) (deep load)
- Length: 605 ft 1.5 in (184.4 m) (o/a)
- Beam: 65 ft (19.8 m)
- Draught: 19 ft 3 in (5.9 m) (deep load)
- Installed power: 12 × Yarrow boilers; 60,000 shp (45,000 kW)
- Propulsion: 4 × shafts; 4 × geared steam turbines
- Speed: 30 knots (56 km/h; 35 mph)
- Range: 5,640 nmi (10,450 km; 6,490 mi) at 10 knots (19 km/h; 12 mph)
- Complement: 712
- Armament: 7 × single 7.5 in (191 mm) guns; 6 × single 3 in (76 mm) low-angle guns; 4 × single 3 in AA guns; 2 × single 2-pdr (1.6 in (40 mm)) AA guns; 6 × 21 in (533 mm) torpedo tubes
- Armour: Belt: 1.5–3 in (38–76 mm); Deck: 1–1.5 in (25–38 mm); Gun shields: 1 in (25 mm)

General characteristics (May 1942)
- Installed power: 8 × Yarrow boilers; 55,000 shp (41,000 kW)
- Speed: 29.5 knots (54.6 km/h; 33.9 mph)
- Range: 6,768 nmi (12,534 km; 7,788 mi) at 10 knots
- Sensors & processing systems: 1 × Type 281 early-warning radar; 1 × Type 273 surface-search radar; 2 × Type 285 fire-control radars
- Armament: 7 × single 7.5 in (191 mm) guns; 4 × single 4 in (102 mm) AA guns; 2 × quadruple, 2 × single 2-pdr AA guns; 7 × 20 mm (0.8 in) Oerlikon AA guns

HMS Hawkins was the lead ship of her class of five heavy cruisers built for the Royal Navy during the First World War, although the ship was not completed until 1919. She was assigned to the China Station until 1928 and was briefly assigned to the Atlantic Fleet in 1929–1930, always serving as a flagship, before being placed in reserve. Hawkins was recommissioned in 1932 for service on the East Indies Station, but returned to reserve three years later. The ship was disarmed in 1937–1938 and converted into a cadet training ship in 1938.

When the Second World War began in 1939, the Royal Navy decided to reconvert her back into a heavy cruiser and her original armament was reinstalled. Hawkins reentered service in early 1940 and was assigned to the South Atlantic Division where she patrolled for Axis commerce raiders and escorted convoys. The following year, she was transferred to the Indian Ocean where she played a small role in the East African campaign in early 1941. At the end of the year, the ship returned home for a lengthy refit. Upon its completion in mid-1942, Hawkins was assigned to the Eastern Fleet and resumed her former roles of patrolling and escort duty for the next two years.

The ship returned to the UK in early 1944 to participate in Operation Neptune, the naval portion of the invasion of Normandy in June. She bombarded German coastal defences on 6 June, but was paid off in July. The Royal Navy decided to convert her back into a training ship while she was under repair, but that work was cancelled in 1945. Hawkins was placed back in reserve that year and was used for bombing trials in 1947. The vessel was sold for scrap later that year.

== Design and description ==
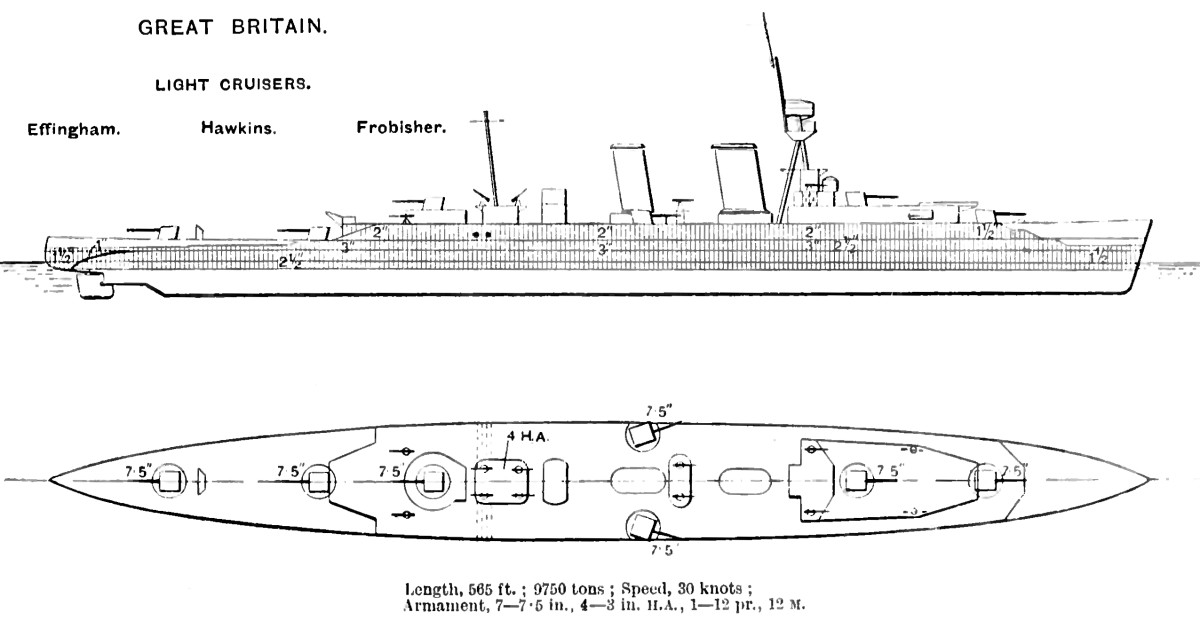
Right plan and elevation from Brassey's Naval Annual 1923

The Hawkins-class cruisers were designed to be able to hunt down commerce raiders in the open ocean, for which they needed a heavy armament, high speed and long range. Hawkins had an overall length of 605 feet 1.5 inches (184.4 m), a beam of 65 feet (19.8 m) and a draught of 19 feet 3 inches (5.9 m) at deep load. She displaced 9,800 long tons (10,000 t) at normal load and 12,110 long tons (12,300 t) at deep load. The ship had a metacentric height of 4 ft (1.2 m) fully loaded. Her crew consisted of 712 officers and ratings.

Hawkins was powered by four Parsons geared steam turbines, each driving one propeller shaft using steam provided by a dozen Yarrow boilers, four of which were coal fired. The turbines, rated at 60,000 shaft horsepower (45,000 kW), were intended to give a maximum speed of 30 knots (56 km/h; 35 mph). During her sea trials at deep displacement, the ship reached 28.7 knots (53.2 km/h; 33.0 mph) from 61,000 shp (45,000 kW), 0.3 knots (0.56 km/h; 0.35 mph) below her designed speed at full load. Hawkins carried enough fuel oil and coal to give her a range of 5,640 nautical miles (10,450 km; 6,490 mi) at 10 knots (19 km/h; 12 mph).

The main armament of the Hawkins-class ships consisted of seven 7.5-inch (191 mm) Mk VI guns in single mounts protected by 1-inch (25 mm) gun shields. They were arranged with five guns on the centreline, four of which were in superfiring pairs fore and aft of the superstructure, the fifth gun on the quarterdeck, and the last two as wing guns abreast the aft funnel. Their secondary armament consisted of ten 3-inch (76 mm) 20 cwt guns. (Note: "Cwt" is the abbreviation for hundredweight, 20 cwt referring to the weight of the gun.) Six of these were in low-angle mounts, two in casemates between the forward 7.5-inch guns, another pair on platforms abreast the conning tower and the remaining guns on a platform between the funnels, although all the low-angle guns were removed in 1921. The last four served as anti-aircraft (AA) guns and were positioned around the base of the mainmast. The rest of their anti-aircraft suite consisted of a pair of 2-pounder (1.6-inch (40 mm)) AA guns. The ships were also fitted with six 21-inch (533 mm) torpedo tubes, one submerged and two above water on each broadside.

The guns of the first three Hawkins-class ships to be completed, Vindictive, Raleigh and Hawkins, were controlled by a mechanical Mark I Dreyer Fire-control Table. It used data provided by the 15-foot (4.6 m) coincidence rangefinder in the pedestal-type gunnery director positioned under the spotting top at the head of the tripod mast. The ships were also fitted with one 12-foot (3.7 m) and a 9-foot (2.7 m) rangefinder.

The Hawkins class were protected by a full-length waterline armoured belt that covered most of the ships' sides. It was thickest over the boiler and engine rooms, ranging from 1.5 to 3 inches (38 to 76 mm) thick. Their magazines were protected by an additional 0.5 to 1 inch (13 to 25 mm) of armour. There was a 1-inch aft transverse bulkhead and the conning tower was protected by 3-inch armour plates. The ships' deck protection consisted of 1 to 1.5 inches of high-tensile steel.

== Construction and career ==
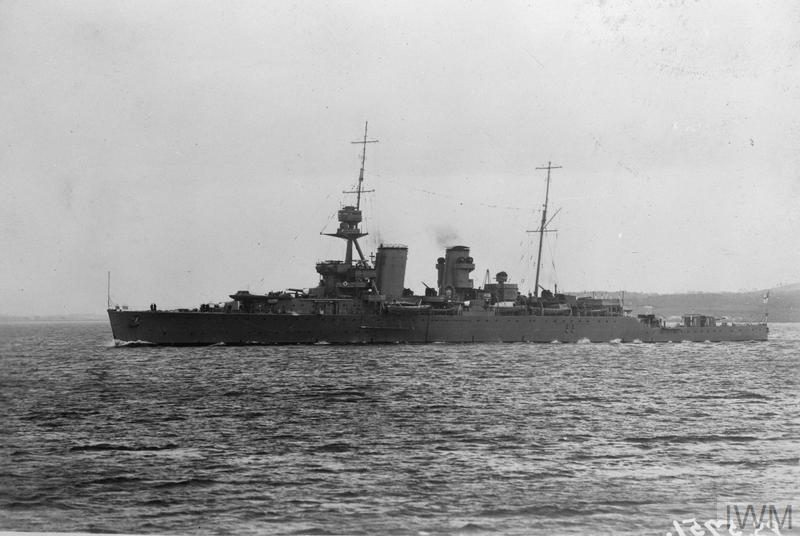
Hawkins underway, between 1929–1935

Hawkins, named after Admiral Sir John Hawkins, one of the leaders of the fleet that defeated the Spanish Armada in 1588, has been the only ship of her name to serve in the Royal Navy. The ship was ordered in December 1915, laid down by HM Dockyard, Chatham on 3 June 1916, launched on 1 October 1917 and completed on 23 July 1919. Hawkins was the flagship of the 5th Light Cruiser Squadron on the China Station by September 1920 and continued in that role for the next eight years. She returned to Chatham on 12 November 1928 to undergo a refit that involved the removal of her four coal-fired boilers and the remaining eight oil-fired boilers modified to partially offset the loss of the other boilers. The ship's turbines were now rated at 55,000 shp (41,000 kW) to give her a speed of 29.5 knots (54.6 km/h; 33.9 mph). The coal-fired boiler room was converted into an oil tank which increased her storage capacity to 2,600 long tons (2,642 t) and boosted her range by 20%. Her three-inch AA guns were replaced by an equal number of four-inch (102 mm) Mk V AA guns which were controlled by a Mk I HACS gunnery director. The ship was now equipped with the 15-inch rangefinder in the HACS director and three 12-inch rangefinders.

Hawkins recommissioned on 31 December 1929 and became the flagship of the 2nd Cruiser Squadron of the Atlantic Fleet until she reduced to the reserve on 5 May 1930. The ship was recommissioned again in September 1932 to become the flagship of the 4th Cruiser Squadron on the East Indies Station, but was again reduced to reserve in April 1935. The terms of the London Naval Treaty meant that Hawkins had to be demilitarised in 1937–1938 and she had all her 7.5-inch guns and the above-water torpedo tubes removed. From July 1937 she was the flagship of Vice-Admiral Max Horton, Vice-Admiral Commanding Reserve Fleet. In June 1938 this duty passed to HMS Effingham. In September 1938 Hawkins became a cadet training ship.

=== Wartime service ===
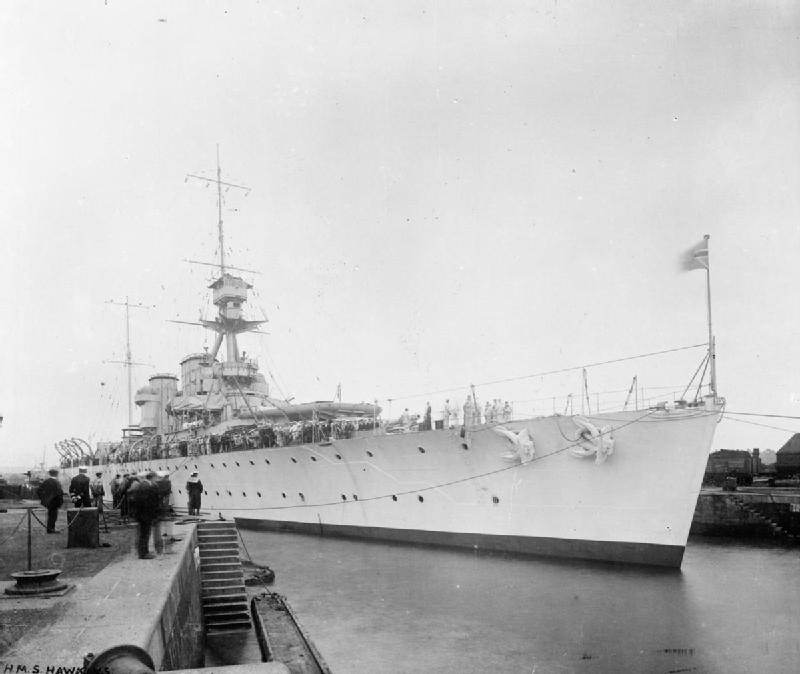
Hawkins moored alongside the quayside

When the Second World War began in September 1939, Hawkins had her guns and torpedo tubes reinstalled and her anti-aircraft armament was reinforced by the addition of four single two-pounder AA guns. The ship recommissioned as a heavy cruiser in January 1940 and was assigned to the South American Division of the North America and West Indies Station. She patrolled off the South American coast, searching for German commerce raiders for most of the next year.

In January 1941 Hawkins began escorting convoys off the West African coast, rescuing nine survivors from the oil tanker British Premier on 3 January, which had been torpedoed off Freetown by the U-65. The following month, she escorted the aircraft carrier Formidable as she sailed up the East African coast bound for the Suez Canal. En route, the carrier's aircraft bombed the port of Mogadishu in Italian Somaliland on 2 February. Shortly afterwards, Hawkins was transferred to Force T which had been formed to support the British invasion of Italian Somaliland with gunfire from Hawkins and three other cruisers in addition to the aircraft of the carrier Hermes. On 10–12 February, Hawkins captured five Italian merchant ships totalling 28,055 gross register tons (GRT) that had attempted to escape from Kismayo, including SS Adria. Ten days later the cruiser briefly joined the escorts of WS-5BX off Mombasa, British Kenya, but she was detached on the 22nd in an unsuccessful search for the German heavy cruiser Admiral Scheer after that ship had been spotted by a British aircraft.

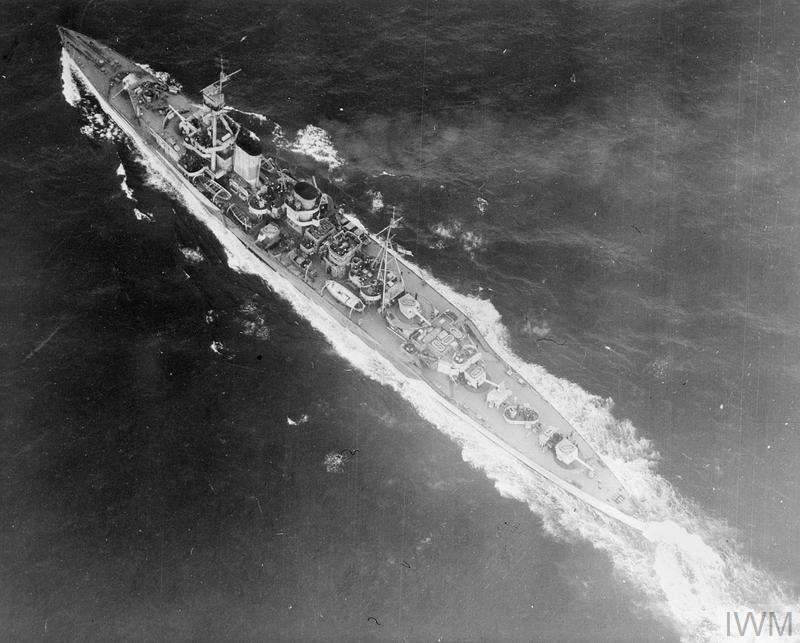
Aerial view of Hawkins after her refit, June 1942

Hawkins remained in the Indian Ocean, escorting convoys and searching for Axis commerce raiders, until she returned to the UK to begin a refit at HM Dockyard, Devonport, on 4 December. Her light anti-aircraft armament was greatly augmented by the addition of two quadruple two-pounder mounts and the exchange of a pair of two-pounder single mounts for seven single 20 mm (0.8 in) Oerlikon AA guns. In addition, a Type 281 early-warning radar, a Type 273 surface-search radar and a pair of Type 285 anti-aircraft gunnery radars were fitted on the roofs of the newly-installed four-inch directors.

The repairs were completed by May 1942 and Hawkins returned to the Indian Ocean where she was assigned to the Eastern Fleet. She resumed her convoy escort duties and continued to patrol in search of Axis commerce raiders for the next two years. During one of these escort missions, the troop ship SS Khedive Ismail was torpedoed with heavy loss of life by the Japanese submarine I-27 on 12 February 1944. Later that year, Hawkins returned home, visiting Scapa Flow, Lough Neagh and the Clyde for exercises before participating in the Normandy landings. Initially assigned to the 1st Cruiser Squadron of the Home Fleet, she was detached to the Western Task Force Gunfire Support Bombardment Force U to support American troops landing at Utah Beach. On 6 June, the ship bombarded the coastal artillery positions in Grandcamp-Maisy and Saint-Martin-de-Varreville with some effect.

The following month she was paid off and was sent to Rosyth, Scotland, for repairs and to be converted into a training ship. The navy took advantage of the dockyard time and upgraded her anti-aircraft armament by exchanging her quadruple two-pounder mounts for octuple mounts and adding a pair of Oerlikon AA guns during 8–23 August. In September, she participated briefly in Highball trials in Loch Striven. The conversion was cancelled in May 1945 and Hawkins was reduced to reserve and laid up in the River Fal. In 1947 she was used for target trials to test the effectiveness of 500-pound (230 kg) and 1,000-pound (450 kg) bombs, and was bombed by Royal Air Force Avro Lincoln bombers from an altitude of 18,000 feet (5,500 m) off Spithead in May. A total of 616 bombs were dropped over 27 days, but only 29 struck the cruiser, of which 13 failed to detonate. Hawkins was transferred to the British Iron & Steel Corporation on 26 August 1947 and broken up in December that year at the Arnott Young scrapyard at Dalmuir, Scotland.

== Sources ==
- Bellars, Robert A. (2007). "Question 18/02: British Base at Addu Atoll". Warship International. XLIV (2): 160. ISSN 0043-0374.
- Brown, David K. (1987). Lambert, Andrew (ed.). "Ship Trials". Warship (44): 242–248. ISSN 0142-6222.
- Buffetaut, Yves (1994). D-Day Ships: The Allied Invasion Fleet, June 1944. Naval Institute Press. ISBN 1-55750-152-1.
- Colledge, J. J.; Warlow, Ben & Bush, Steve (2020). Ships of the Royal Navy: The Complete Record of all Fighting Ships of the Royal Navy from the 15th Century to the Present (5th revised and updated ed.). Seaforth Publishing. ISBN 978-1-5267-9327-0.
- Crabb, Brian James (2015). Passage to Destiny: The Sinking of the SS Khedive Ismail in the sea war against Japan. Shaun Tyas. ISBN 978-1-907730-41-2.
- Dittmar, F. J. & Colledge, J. J. (1972). British Warships 1914–1919. Ian Allan. ISBN 0-7110-0380-7.
- Dodson, Aidan (2024). The British Hawkins Class Cruisers: An Odyssey through Two World Wars. Seaforth Publishing. ISBN 978-1-3990-5612-0.
- Friedman, Norman (2010). British Cruisers: Two World Wars and After. Seaforth. ISBN 978-1-59114-078-8.
- Lenton, H. T. (1973). British Cruisers. Macdonald. ISBN 0-3850-4780-0.
- Morris, Douglas (1987). Cruisers of the Royal and Commonwealth Navies Since 1879. Maritime Books. ISBN 0-907771-35-1.
- Preston, Antony (1985). "Great Britain and Empire Forces". In Gray, Randal (ed.). Conway's All the World's Fighting Ships 1906–1921. Naval Institute Press. pp. 1–104. ISBN 0-85177-245-5.
- Raven, Alan & Roberts, John (1980). British Cruisers of World War Two. Naval Institute Press. ISBN 0-87021-922-7.
- Whitley, M. J. (1995). Cruisers of World War Two: An International Encyclopedia. Cassell. ISBN 1-86019-874-0.
