= HMS Frobisher (D81) =

Hawkins-class heavy cruisers for the Royal Navy

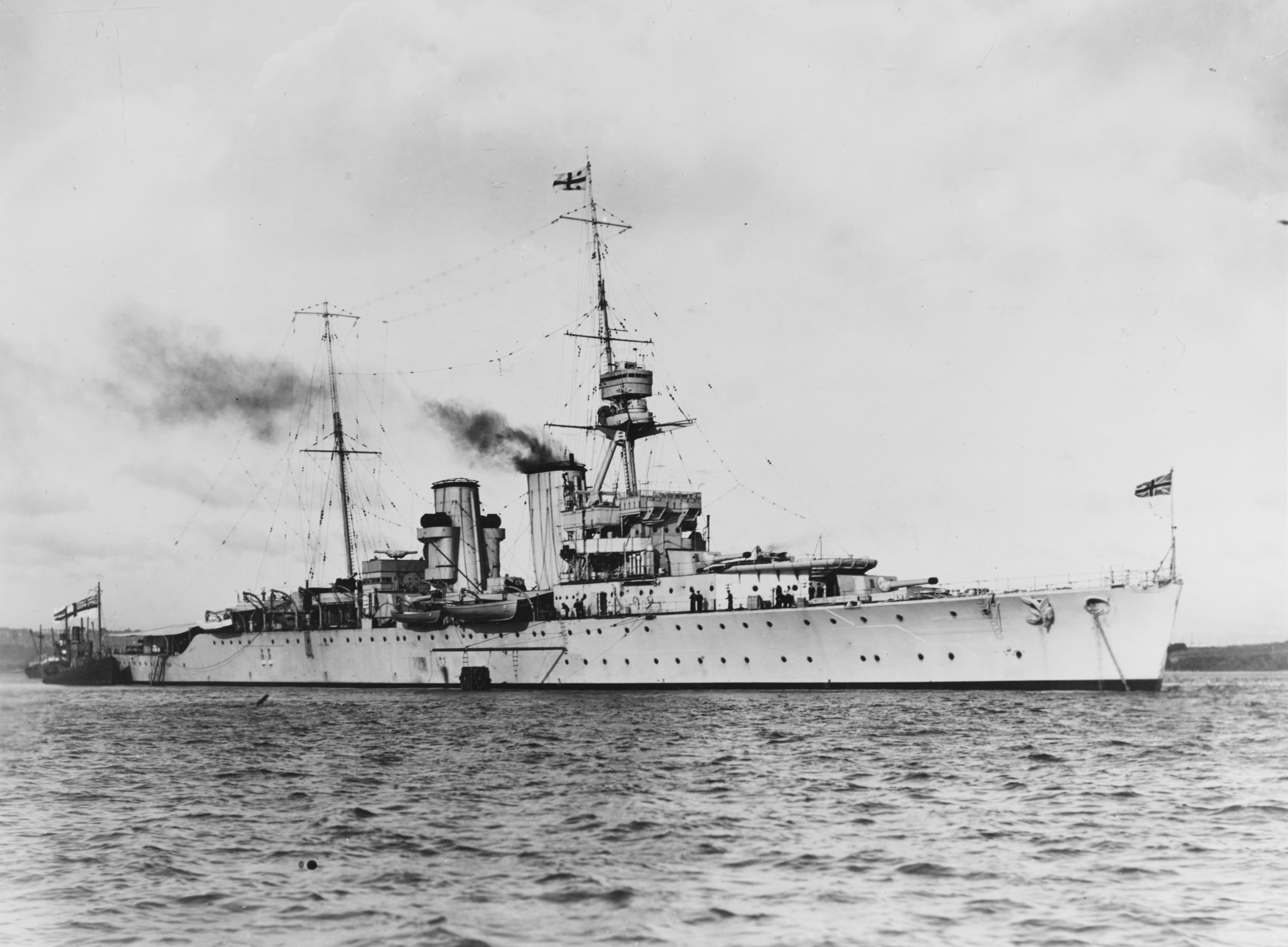
- Frobisher c. 1924–1930

History

United Kingdom
- Name: Frobisher
- Namesake: Sir Martin Frobisher
- Ordered: December 1915
- Builder: HM Dockyard, Devonport
- Laid down: 2 August 1916
- Launched: 20 March 1920
- Commissioned: 20 September 1924
- Out of service: 1947
- Reclassified: As a training ship, 1932; As a heavy cruiser, March 1942; As a training ship, May 1945
- Identification: Pennant number: 81 (1924); I81 (1938); D81 (1940)
- Fate: Sold for scrap, 26 March 1949

General characteristics (as built)
- Class & type: Hawkins-class heavy cruiser
- Displacement: 9,860 long tons (10,020 t) (standard); 12,300 long tons (12,500 t) (deep load)
- Length: 604 ft 2 in (184.2 m) (o/a)
- Beam: 65 ft (19.8 m)
- Draught: 19 ft 3 in (5.9 m) (deep load)
- Installed power: 10 × Yarrow boilers; 65,000 shp (48,000 kW)
- Propulsion: 4 × shafts; 4 × geared steam turbines
- Speed: 30.5 knots (56.5 km/h; 35.1 mph)
- Range: 5,640 nmi (10,450 km; 6,490 mi) at 10 knots (19 km/h; 12 mph)
- Complement: 709
- Armament: 7 × single 7.5 in (191 mm) guns; 3 × single 4 in (102 mm) AA guns; 2 × single 2-pdr (1.6 in (40 mm)) AA guns; 6 × 21 in (533 mm) torpedo tubes
- Armour: Belt: 1.5–3 in (3.8–7.6 cm); Deck: 1–1.5 in (2.5–3.8 cm); Gun shields: 1 in (2.5 cm)

HMS Frobisher was one of five Hawkins-class heavy cruisers built for the Royal Navy during the First World War. She was not finished during the war and construction proceeded very slowly after the end of the war in 1918. Completed in 1924, the ship was initially assigned to the Mediterranean Fleet and was transferred to the Atlantic Fleet in 1929, sometimes serving as a flagship. Placed in reserve in 1930, Frobisher was converted into a cadet training ship in 1932 before being returned to reserve in 1937. Two years later she was reactivated to again serve as a training ship.

When the Second World War began in 1939, the Royal Navy decided to reconvert her back into a heavy cruiser, but the work was repeatedly delayed by higher-priority repairs for other ships and she did not reenter service until early 1942. Frobisher was transferred to the Eastern Fleet and spent most of the next two years on escort duty. She returned to the UK in early 1944 to participate in Operation Neptune, the naval portion of the invasion of Normandy in June. The ship bombarded German coastal defences on 6 June, but was damaged by a torpedo in August. The Royal Navy decided to convert her back into a training ship while she was under repair and that work was completed in 1945. Frobisher served in that role until she was replaced in 1947 and the vessel was sold for scrap in 1949.

== Design and description ==
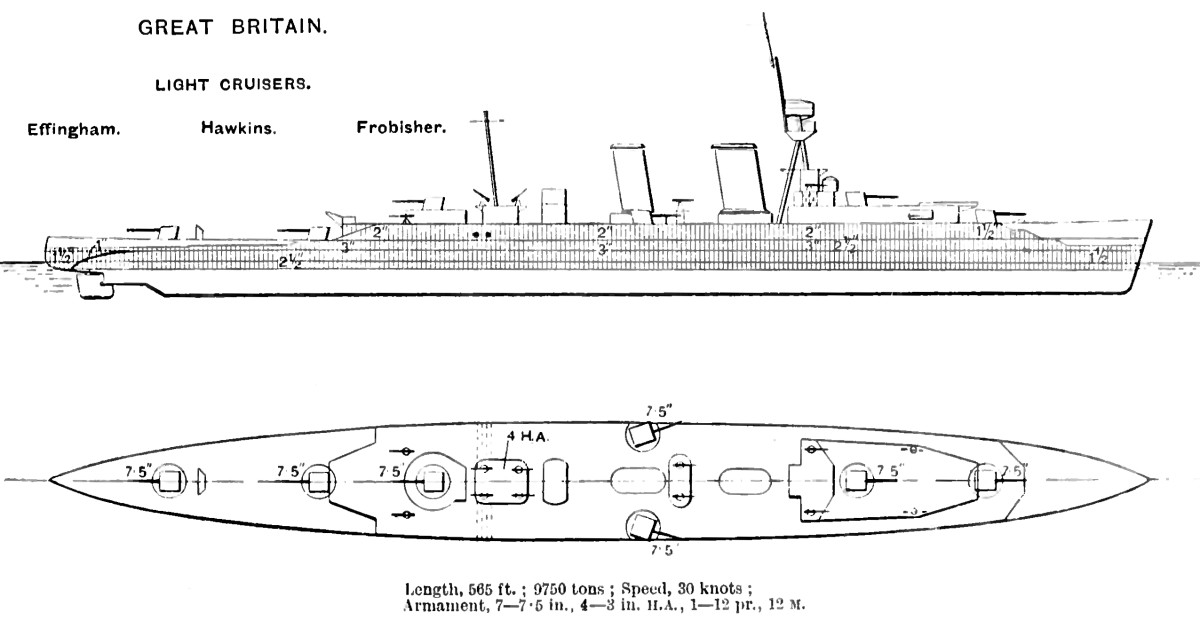
Right plan and elevation from Brassey's Naval Annual 1923

The Hawkins-class cruisers were designed to be able to hunt down commerce raiders in the open ocean, for which they needed a heavy armament, high speed and long range. Frobisher had an overall length of 604 feet 2 inches (184.2 m), a beam of 65 feet (19.8 m) and a draught of 19 feet 3 inches (5.9 m) at deep load. The ship displaced 9,860 long tons (10,020 t) at (standard load) and 12,300 long tons (12,500 t) at deep load. Her crew numbered 37 officers and 672 ratings.

The ships were originally designed with 60,000-shaft-horsepower (45,000 kW) propulsion machinery, but the Admiralty decided in 1917 to replace their four coal-fired boilers with more powerful oil-burning ones. This change could only be applied to the three least-advanced ships, including Frobisher, although she did not receive the full upgrade. The ship was powered by four Brown-Curtis geared steam turbine sets, each driving one propeller shaft using steam provided by 10 Yarrow boilers that were ducted into two funnels. The turbines were rated at 65,000 shp (48,000 kW) for a speed of 30.5 knots (56.5 km/h; 35.1 mph). Frobisher carried 2,186 long tons (2,221 t) of fuel oil to give her a range of 5,640 nautical miles (10,450 km; 6,490 mi) at 10 knots (19 km/h; 12 mph).

The main armament of the Hawkins-class ships consisted of seven 7.5-inch (191 mm) Mk VI guns in single mounts protected by 1-inch (25 mm) gun shields. They were arranged with five guns on the centreline, four of which were in superfiring pairs fore and aft of the superstructure, the fifth gun was further aft on the quarterdeck, and the last two as wing guns abreast the aft funnel. Their anti-aircraft suite consisted of three 4-inch (102 mm) Mk V guns and a pair of two-pounder (1.6-inch (40 mm)) guns. Two of the Mk V guns were positioned at the base of the mainmast and the third gun was on the quarterdeck. The two-pounders were mounted on a platform between the funnels. The ships were also fitted with six 21-inch (533 mm) torpedo tubes, one submerged and two above water on each broadside.

Frobisher's guns were controlled by a mechanical Mark III Dreyer Fire-control Table. It used data provided by the 15-foot (4.6 m) coincidence rangefinder in the gunnery director positioned under the spotting top at the head of the tripod mast. The ship was also fitted with three 12-foot (3.7 m) rangefinders.

The Hawkins class were protected by a full-length waterline armoured belt that covered most of the ships' sides. It was thickest over the boiler and engine rooms, ranging from 1.5 to 3 inches (38 to 76 mm) thick. Their magazines were protected by an additional 0.5 to 1 inch (13 to 25 mm) of armour. There was a 1-inch aft transverse bulkhead and the conning tower was protected by 3-inch armour plates. The ships' deck protection consisted of 1 to 1.5 inches of high-tensile steel.

== Construction and career ==
Frobisher, named after Admiral Sir Martin Frobisher, one of the leaders of the fleet that defeated the Spanish Armada in 1587, has been the only ship of her name to serve in the Royal Navy. The ship was ordered in December 1915, laid down by HM Dockyard, Devonport on 2 August 1916, launched on 20 March 1920 and completed on 20 September 1924. She was assigned to the 1st Cruiser Squadron of the Mediterranean Fleet after working up. The ship's Royal Marines participated in an amphibious landing exercise in June 1926. Rear-Admiral William Boyle hoisted his flag in Frobisher when he took command of the squadron in September. The squadron was temporarily deployed to the China Station before Boyle relinquished command on 10 September 1928 to Rear-Admiral Henry Parker. The ship participated in a torpedo exercise on 24 August and then in a fleet exercise in January and a combined exercise with the Atlantic Fleet in March 1929.

In 1927–1928 Frobisher was briefly fitted with a prototype F.I.H aircraft catapult and a crane on the quarterdeck, displacing the four-inch AA gun. Together with a fourth AA gun, the displaced gun was moved to a platform between the funnels. In 1929–1930 the ship served with the Atlantic Fleet. By June 1930 her aft superfiring gun had been removed to provide space for a floatplane and her superstructure was built up around the base of the mainmast. Later that year Frobisher was reduced to reserve and became the flagship of the Vice-Admiral Commanding the Reserve. The ship was converted to a cadet training ship in 1932 and the forward quarterdeck 7.5-inch gun and two 4-inch AA guns were removed. By July 1935 she had received her aircraft catapult where the aft superfiring 7.5-inch gun had been located. All of her guns were removed in 1936, as were the above-water torpedo tubes, and a single 4.7-inch (120 mm) was added. Frobisher returned to reserve in 1937 and was stationed at Devonport. The ship was transferred to Portsmouth in early 1939 where she again served as a cadet training ship.

=== Wartime service ===
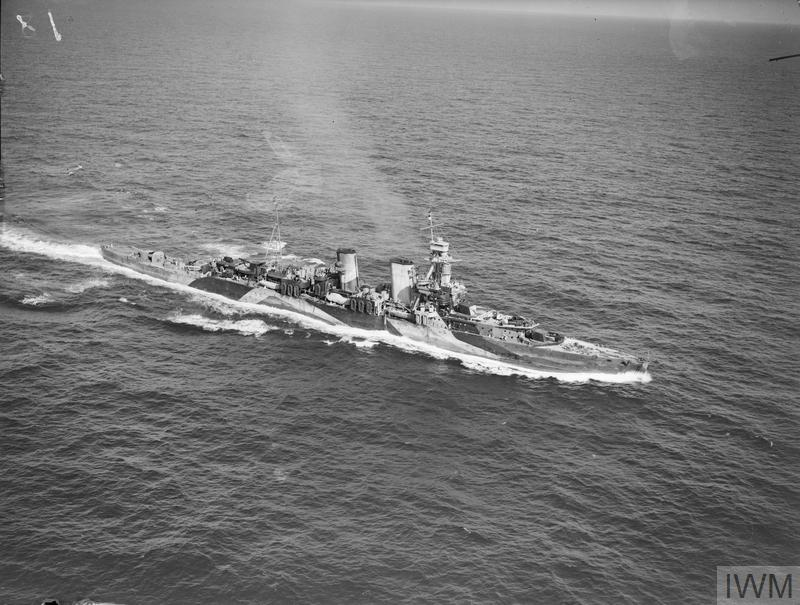
Frobisher in the Indian Ocean, 16 June 1942

Shortly before the Second World War began in September, the Royal Navy decided to give Frobisher and her sister ship Hawkins limited rebuilds along the lines of their sister Effingham, but with their original armament reinstalled. Work was planned to begin in September, but it did not start until 5 January 1940 at a very low priority.

The original plan was to reinstall all seven 7.5-inch guns and the above-water torpedo tubes, increase the number of 4-inch AA guns to five, add two quadruple and two single two-pounder mounts, and three 20 mm (0.8 in) Oerlikon AA guns. To do this the catapult and crane were removed and the built up superstructure around the mainmast was removed. In 1941 the plan was revised in light of battle experience and another pair of quadruple two-pounder mounts replaced the wing 7.5-inch guns and the single two-pounder mounts were exchanged for four additional Oerlikons. Before the refit was completed in March 1942, a Type 281 early-warning radar, a Type 273 surface-search radar and a pair of Type 285 anti-aircraft gunnery radars were fitted on the roofs of the newly installed four-inch directors. A set of depth-charge rails was added on the stern and the ship was fitted with hydrophones at the bow.

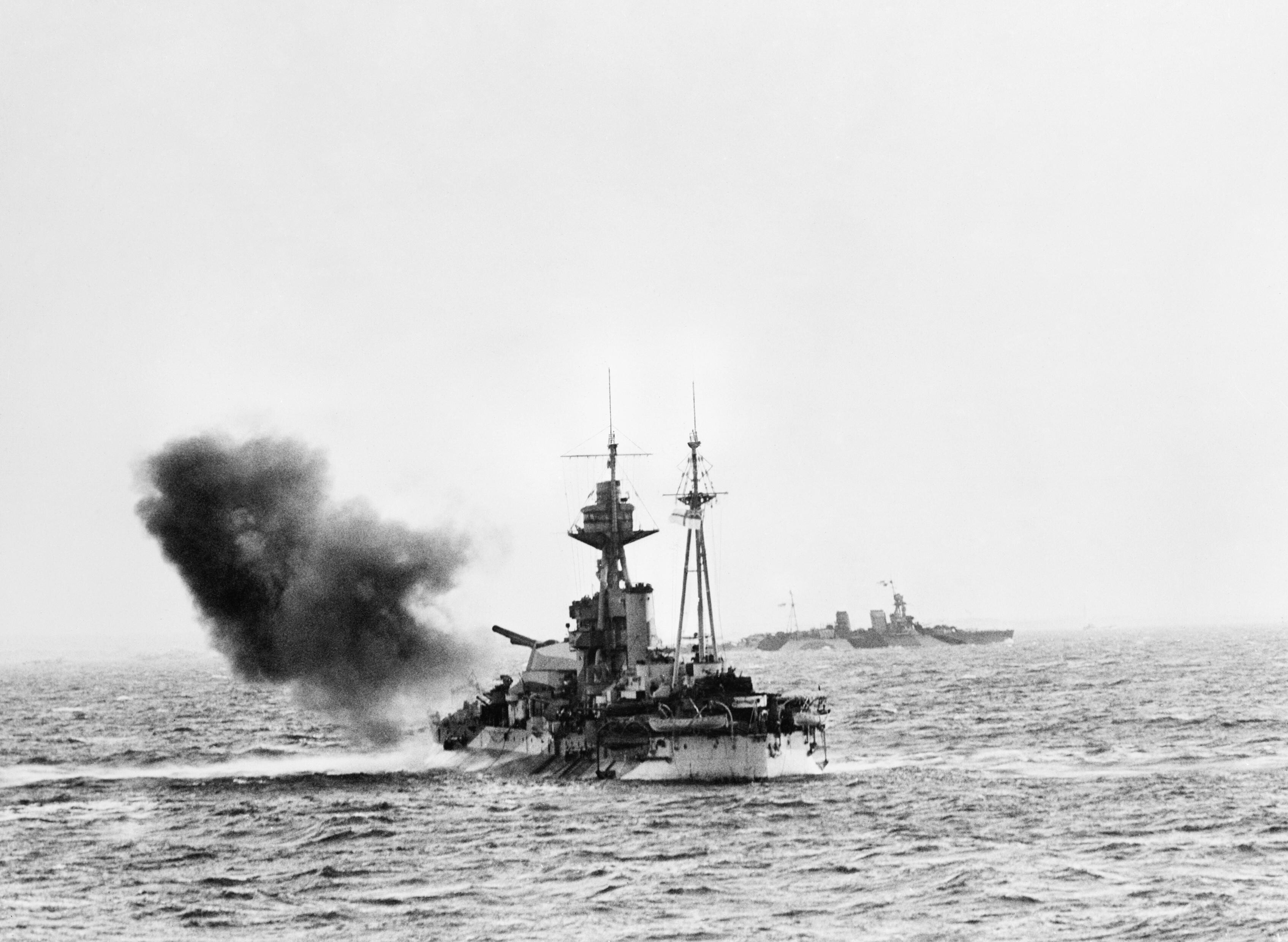
Frobisher is in the background; the monitor Roberts is firing in the foreground, 6 June 1944

Frobisher was assigned to the 4th Cruiser Squadron of the Eastern Fleet after the refit was completed and began escorting convoys and the fleet's capital ships in the Indian Ocean. The ship took over the tow of the French light cruiser Le Triomphant in December 1943 after she had been badly damaged in a typhoon; they arrived in Diego Suarez, Madagascar, on 19 December. Frobisher returned to the UK in March 1944 to prepare for Operation Neptune; the ship had her anti-aircraft armament augmented by a dozen single Oerlikons and her four quadruple two-pounder mounts were replaced by a pair of octuple mounts during a refit that lasted from 5 April to May.

On 6 June Frobisher was assigned to Gunfire Bombardment Support Force D which initially targeted the defenses at Sword Beach during the D-Day landings. The ship is known to have bombarded the coastal artillery position at Riva-Bella in Ouistreham and to have knocked out the fire-control observation post in the town proper with a direct hit. During this time, her manually loaded main guns are reported to have fired at a rate of five rounds per minute. In August, she and the repair ship Albatross were damaged by long-range G7e Dackel torpedoes fired from E-boats in the Baie de la Seine.

While Frobisher was under repair at HM Dockyard, Chatham, the Royal Navy decided to reconvert her into a training ship for 150 cadets. After her repairs were completed in September, the ship steam north to Rosyth, Scotland, to begin the conversion. The two superfiring and the aft quarterdeck 7.5-inch guns were removed as were the four amidships 4-inch AA guns, the octuple two-pounder mounts, some of the single Oerlikons and the depth-charge rails. The directors for the two-pounder guns were also removed. A 6-inch (150 mm) gun was added in the forward superfiring position and a quadruple 21-inch torpedo mount where the aft quarterdeck 7.5-inch gun had been located. Her Type 281 radar was probably replaced by a Type 291 early-warning radar at this time. When her conversion was completed in May 1945, her armament consisted of three 7.5-inch guns, one 6-inch gun, a 4-inch AA gun, 11 or 13 Oerlikons and the quadruple torpedo mount. By July 1946, Frobisher's 4-inch high-angle directors had been removed. The ship was replaced as a cadet training ship by the heavy cruiser Devonshire in 1947. She was sold for scrap to John Cashmore Ltd on 26 March 1949 and arrived at their facility in Newport, Wales, to be broken up on 11 May of that year.
