= HMS Vindictive (1918) =

British Hawkins-class heavy cruiser

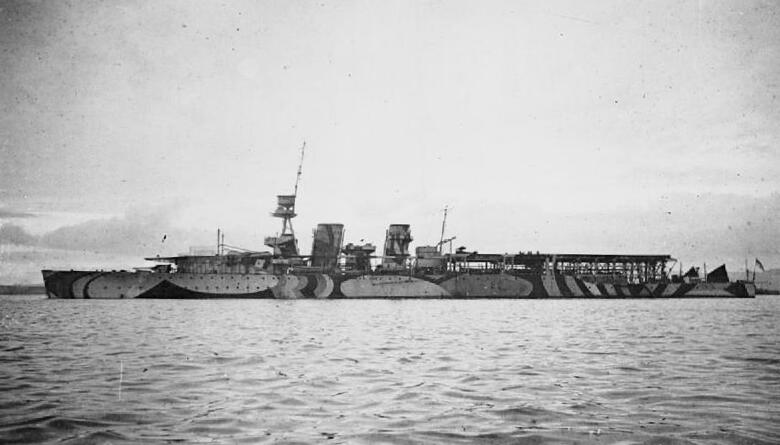
- Vindictive as an aircraft carrier

History

United Kingdom
- Name: Vindictive
- Ordered: April 1916
- Builder: Harland & Wolff, Belfast
- Yard number: 500
- Laid down: 29 June 1916
- Launched: 17 January 1918
- Completed: 19 October 1918
- Commissioned: 1 October 1918
- Renamed: June 1918 from Cavendish
- Reclassified: Aircraft Carrier, then returned to cruiser, 1924.; Training ship in 1937; Repair ship, 1939; Destroyer depot ship, 1944
- Identification: Pennant number: 31 (July 1918); 48 (September 1919); 36 (1920); I36 (1938); D36 (1940)
- Fate: Scrapped, 24 January 1946

General characteristics (as completed 1918)
- Class & type: Laid down as a Hawkins-class heavy cruiser
- Displacement: 9,394 long tons (9,545 t) (light); 12,400 long tons (12,599 t) (deep load)
- Length: 605 ft (184.4 m) (o.a.)
- Beam: 65 ft (19.8 m)
- Draught: 19 ft 3 in (5.9 m) (mean)
- Installed power: 12 × Yarrow boilers; 60,000 shp (45,000 kW)
- Propulsion: 4 × shafts; 4 × geared steam turbines
- Speed: 30 knots (56 km/h; 35 mph)
- Range: 5,400 nmi (10,000 km; 6,200 mi) at 14 knots (26 km/h; 16 mph)
- Complement: 648
- Armament: 4 × single 7.5 in (190 mm) guns; 4 × single 3 in (76 mm) guns; 4 × single 3 in AA guns; 6 × 21 in (533 mm) torpedo tubes
- Armour: Waterline belt: 1.5–4 in (38–102 mm); Deck: 1–1.5 in (25–38 mm); Conning tower: 3 in (76 mm)
- Aircraft carried: 6–12

HMS Vindictive was a warship built during the First World War for the Royal Navy (RN). Originally designed as a Hawkins-class heavy cruiser and laid down under the name Cavendish, she was converted into an aircraft carrier while still being built. Renamed in 1918, she was completed a few weeks before the end of the war and saw no active service with the Grand Fleet. The following year she participated in the British campaign in the Baltic against the Bolsheviks, during which her aircraft made numerous attacks against the naval base at Kronstadt. Vindictive returned home at the end of the year and was placed in reserve for several years before her flight decks were removed and she was reconverted back into a cruiser. The ship retained her aircraft hangar and conducted trials with an aircraft catapult before she was sent to the China Station in 1926. A year after her return in 1928, she was again placed in reserve.

Vindictive was demilitarized and converted into a training ship in 1936–1937. At the beginning of the Second World War she was converted into a repair ship. Her first role after the conversion was completed in early 1940, however, was to transport troops during the Norwegian Campaign. She was then sent to the South Atlantic to support British ships serving there and, in late 1942, to the Mediterranean to support the ships there. Vindictive returned home in 1944 and was damaged by a German torpedo off the coast of Normandy after the Allies invaded France. She was reduced to reserve after the war and sold for scrap in 1946.

== Background and description ==
The Hawkins-class cruiser was designed to hunt enemy commerce raiders overseas. This required a large ship to provide the necessary endurance for sustained operations away from supporting bases and high speed to catch the raiders. The design was also given high freeboard to allow it to maintain its speed in heavy weather. Sir Eustace Tennyson d'Eyncourt, the Director of Naval Construction, included both coal and oil-fired boilers to provide the ship with fuel no matter the supply conditions. Four ships were ordered, named after famous Elizabethan seafarers, in 1915 and the fifth and last was ordered in April 1916, named HMS Cavendish after the adventurer and circumnavigator Thomas Cavendish. By this time the threat from German cruisers and raiders had ended, so construction proceeded slowly.

The cruisers had an overall length of 605 feet (184.4 m), a beam of 65 feet (19.8 m), and a mean draught of 19 feet 3 inches (5.9 m) at deep load. They were designed to displace 9,750 long tons (9,906 t) and had a complement of 37 officers and 672 ratings.

The ships had four Parsons geared steam turbines, each of which drove one propeller shaft. The turbines were designed to produce a total of 60,000 shaft horsepower (45,000 kW) for a speed of 30 knots (56 km/h; 35 mph). Steam for the turbines was provided by 12 Yarrow boilers; 8 of these were oil-fired while the remaining 4 used coal. They had a stowage capacity of 800 long tons (813 t) of coal and 1,600 long tons (1,626 t) of fuel oil, giving them a range of 5,400 nautical miles (10,000 km; 6,200 mi) at a speed of 14 knots (26 km/h; 16 mph).

The main armament of the Hawkins-class cruisers consisted of seven 45-calibre 7.5 in (190 mm) Mk VI guns in pivot mounts. They were arranged in two superfiring pairs, one each fore and aft of the superstructure, one on each broadside abreast the rear funnel, and the last was on the quarterdeck at the same level as the lower of the rear superfiring pair; they were designated 1 through 7 from front to rear. At maximum elevation these guns fired a 200-pound (91 kg) shell to a range of 21,114 yards (19,307 m).

Their secondary armament comprised ten quick-firing (QF) 3 in (76 mm) 20 cwt (Note: "Cwt" is the abbreviation for hundredweight, 20 cwt referring to the weight of the gun.) guns. Six of these were on low-angle mounts intended for use against torpedo boats and the remaining four were on high-angle mounts for anti-aircraft defence. They also mounted two submerged tubes, one on each broadside, and four fixed above-water tubes, two on each broadside, for 21-inch torpedoes.

The Hawkins-class cruisers were protected with armour that had a maximum thickness of 4 inches abreast the ships' magazines and a minimum thickness of 1.5 inches (38 mm). It consisted of two layers of high-tensile steel of varying thicknesses that covered most of the ships' sides. The decks had a maximum thickness of 1–1.5 in (25–38 mm) over the engine rooms, boilers, and the steering gear. The conning tower and its communication tube were protected by the only Krupp cemented armour in the ships and had thicknesses of 3 inches and 2 inches (51 mm) respectively.

=== Conversion into an aircraft carrier ===
In January 1917, the Board of Admiralty reviewed the navy's aircraft carrier requirements and decided to order two ships fitted with both a flying-off deck and a landing deck aft. The initial order had to be cancelled in April 1917 for lack of building facilities, so the Admiralty decided to convert Cavendish, already under construction, in June 1917. No. 2 7.5-inch gun, two 3-inch guns and the conning tower were removed and the forward superstructure was remodelled into a 78 by 49 feet (23.8 by 14.9 m) hangar with a capacity for six reconnaissance aircraft. The hangar roof, with a small extension, formed the 106-foot (32 m) flying-off deck. The aircraft were hoisted up through a hatch at the aft end of the flying-off deck by two derricks. The 193 by 57 feet (58.8 by 17.4 m) landing deck required the removal of Nos. 5 and 6 7.5-inch guns and moving the four 3-inch AA guns to an elevated platform between the funnels, in lieu of the 3-inch guns intended for that position. A port side gangway 8 feet (2.4 m) wide connected the landing and flying-off decks to allow aircraft with their wings folded to be wheeled from one to the other. A crash barrier was hung from "the gallows" at the forward end of the landing on deck. To increase her stability after the addition of so much topweight, the upper portion of her anti-torpedo bulge was enlarged.

Although still overweight compared to her designed displacement, the modifications made the ship lighter than her sister ships, at 9,344 long tons (9,494 t) light displacement and a metacentric height of 3.59 feet (1.1 m). She completed her sea trials on 21 September 1918 and reached a speed of 29.12 knots (53.93 km/h; 33.51 mph) from 63,600 shaft horsepower (47,400 kW).

== Construction and career ==
Cavendish was laid down at the Harland & Wolff shipyard in Belfast on 26 June 1916 and launched on 17 January 1918. In June she was renamed Vindictive, the fifth ship of that name in the RN, to perpetuate the name of the old protected cruiser Vindictive, which had distinguished herself in the Zeebrugge Raid of April 1918 and had then been sunk as a blockship at Ostend in May. She commissioned on 1 October and, after briefly working up, joined the Grand Fleet's Flying Squadron on 18 October only a few weeks before the Armistice on 11 November. For the rest of the year she conducted flying trials and exercises, including those of the Port Victoria Grain Griffin reconnaissance aircraft, of which two were lost in accidents. The only landing aboard the ship was made by William Wakefield on 1 November in the fleet's last operational Sopwith Pup. Experiments conducted earlier aboard the larger Furious, with a similarly intact superstructure and funnels, had demonstrated that the turbulence from these was enough to make successful landings almost impossible at high speed. Wakefield minimised the problem by approaching the landing deck at an angle with the ship slowly moving.

Vindictive was dispatched to the Baltic with a dozen aircraft, a mix of Griffins, Sopwith 2F.1 Ship Camel fighters, Sopwith 1½ Strutter and Short Type 184 bombers, on 2 July 1919 to participate in the British campaign in the Baltic in support of the White Russians and the newly independent Baltic states. On 6 July she ran aground on a shoal near Reval at speed. Stuck hard in the tideless Baltic, all of her fuel was dumped overboard, and most of her ammunition as well. Some 2,200 long tons (2,235 t) of stores were also off-loaded, but the ship could not be towed free by the combined efforts of the light cruisers Danae and Cleopatra and three tugboats. Eight days after grounding a fortuitous westerly wind began that raised the water level by 8 inches (203 mm), just enough to pull the ship free. Unbeknownst to the British the entire operation had taken place in a minefield.

The carrier unloaded her air group, commanded by Major Grahame Donald, at Koivisto, Finland on 14 July. Their airfield was still under construction, but they were able to fly a reconnaissance mission over the major Bolshevik naval base at Kronstadt on 26 July while Vindictive sailed to Copenhagen, Denmark, to load aircraft and spares left for her by the carrier Argus. Four days later, Rear Admiral Walter Cowan ordered Donald and his aircraft to attack Kronstadt at night. As their airfield was not yet finished, the ship's flying-off deck was extended to 118 feet (36.0 m) to better allow the bombers to take off with their 112-pound (51 kg) bombs. Accurate anti-aircraft fire kept the aircraft too high for an effective attack, but Donald's men claimed two hits on the submarine tender Pamiat Azova. In reality one bomb struck the oil tanker Tatiana, setting it on fire and killing one man. That same day eight RN Coastal Motor Boat (CMB)s arrived; Vindictive served as their depot ship.

Vindictive's aircraft continued to support British operations against the Bolsheviks until they left the Baltic in December, although no further missions were flown from the carrier. They shot down a helium-filled observation balloon and spotted for ships conducted shore bombardments. Most importantly, nine of them attacked Kronstadt during the night of 17/18 August 1919 to provide a diversion for an attack by the CMBs on ships in Kronstadt harbour. As a result, the torpedo boats damaged the battleship Andrei Pervozvanny and sank Pamiat Azova. In subsequent attacks on Kronstadt, they nearly hit Andrei Pervozvanny while she was in drydock, nearly hit a minesweeper, killing one crewman from the explosion, and hit two auxiliary ships. By December it was clear that the Whites' offensive against Petrograd had failed and the British began withdrawing; Vindictive left three Camels in Latvia, embarked the rest of her aircraft and sailed for home on 22 December.

She was paid off into reserve at Portsmouth Dockyard on 24 December and received permanent repairs of her damage from the grounding, at a cost of £200,000. Furious and Vindictive had proven that the idea of "cruiser-carriers" was unworkable due to the turbulence from their superstructures and that a complete flight deck was necessary to successfully operate aircraft at sea. The Admiralty had considered converting her to that configuration, with an island, in July 1918 while still building, but had decided to wait on the results of tests conducted with Argus evaluating different designs for the island. Vindictive was thought to be too small to be an effective carrier and the financial restrictions in place after the war vitiated against such a major reconstruction.

=== As cruiser ===
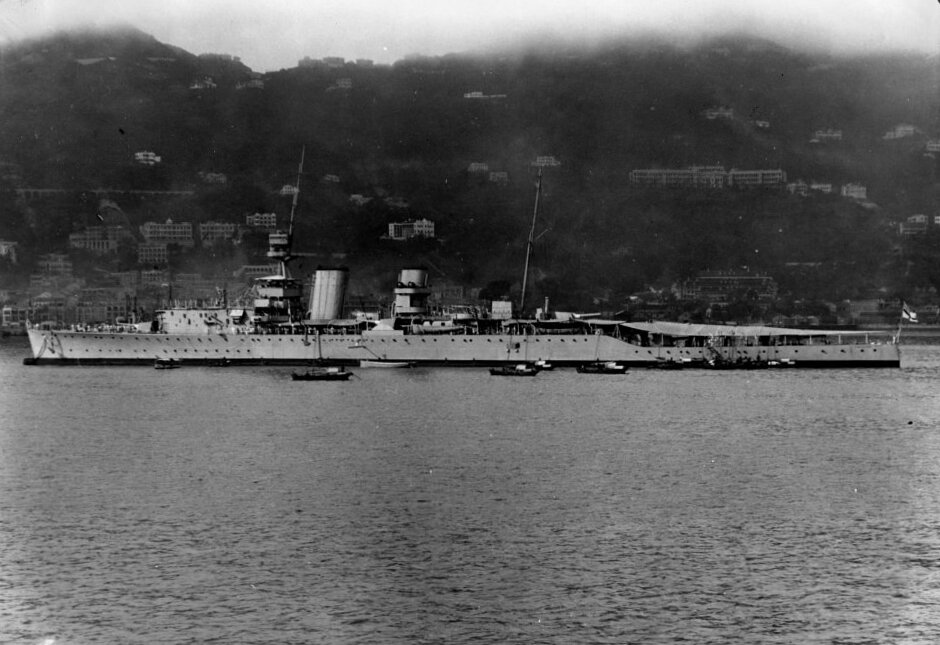
Vindictive in China after re-conversion into a cruiser, 1926

For the next several years the ship was either in reserve or used as a troop transport, until she began reconversion into a cruiser at Chatham Dockyard on 1 March 1923. The flight decks were removed and she was mostly restored to her designed configuration, although her 3-inch AA guns were replaced by three QF 4 inch Mk V AA guns. Two of these were mounted on a platform between the aft funnel and the mainmast and the third gun was positioned on the quarterdeck between the two 7.5-inch guns. The major exception was that No. 2 7.5-inch gun was not installed and she retained her hangar in the forward superstructure. The two derricks that serviced the hangar were replaced by a single crane on the starboard side of the hangar roof. No. 2's position was occupied by a prototype compressed-air Carey aircraft catapult, the first British cruiser to mount a catapult. Vindictive used it for the first time on 3 October when she launched a Fairey IIID floatplane. She also conducted catapult trials on float-equipped Fairey Flycatcher fighters.

She sailed for the China Station on 1 January 1926 with six Fairey IIIDs aboard for anti-piracy patrols and departed for home on 14 March 1928. She arrived in May and her catapult was removed in October, ending her career as an aviation ship. Vindictive was again reduced to reserve in 1929, making occasional trooping voyages. In July 1935 the ship was briefly sailed from her reserve mooring to join in the King George V's Silver Jubilee Fleet Review held on the 15th.

=== As training ship ===
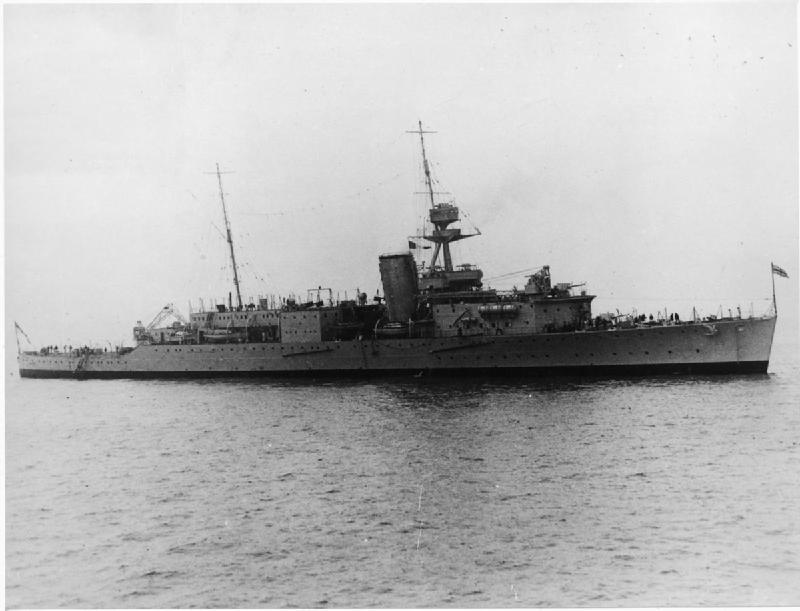
Vindictive in September 1937 as a training ship

In 1936–1937, Vindictive was demilitarised in accordance with the terms of the London Naval Treaty and converted to a training ship for cadets. Her two inboard propellers were removed as were the inboard turbines; half of her boilers were removed and their compartments were converted into accommodation. The aft funnel was removed, the aft superstructure remodelled and enlarged and her hangar converted into more accommodation space. Her armament, including the above-water torpedo tubes, was replaced by a pair of 4.7-inch (120 mm) guns forward and a quadruple QF 2-pounder ("pom-pom") AA mount aft. In this form she displaced 9,100 long tons (9,246 t) and was capable of a maximum speed of 24 knots (44 km/h; 28 mph). She was recommissioned on 7 September 1937.

=== As fleet repair ship ===
After the Second World War began in August 1939, Vindictive was transferred to Devonport for a modernisation like that of her sister Effingham, with nine 6-inch (152 mm) guns, four twin-gun 4-inch (102 mm) mounts and a catapult. She had a low priority so little work had been done by early October, when a less complex modernisation was considered. This proposal had six 6-inch guns and three 4-inch AA guns, and her former aft boiler room was to be converted from a laundry into an oil tank to extend her range, but this was rejected in favour of a conversion into a fleet repair ship. Her armament was removed and her forward superstructure was extended over the former hangar's roof. Her aft superstructure was extended to be flush with her sides and slightly lengthened, and a large deckhouse was built on the quarterdeck. Her armament now consisted of six single 4-inch QF Mk V AA guns, all on the centreline, two quadruple "pom-pom" mounts, one on each side, and six depth charges. In this role, she had a standard displacement of 10,000 long tons (10,160 t) (12,000 long tons (12,193 t) at full load) and her draught increased to 20 feet 3 inches (6.2 m).

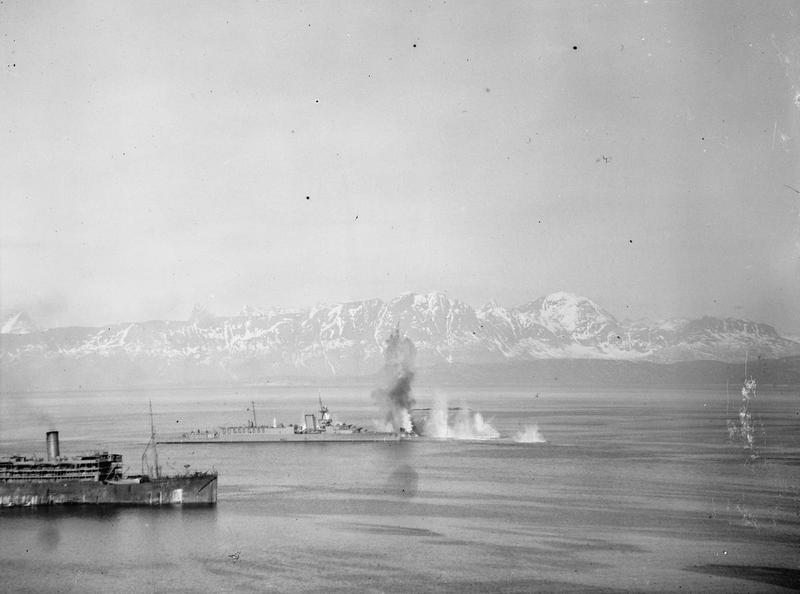
Vindictive nearly hit by bombs while at anchor in Harstad Fjord, 17 May 1940

The conversion was completed on 30 March 1940, just in time for the ship to be used with the Home Fleet as a troop transport during the Norwegian Campaign. She ferried British troops to Narvik in late April and escorted an evacuation convoy from Harstad on 4 June. Vindictive was transferred to the South Atlantic later in the year and remained there until late 1942, when she was ordered north. On the night of 12 November, she was attacked west of Gibraltar by the German submarine U-515, but managed to evade the torpedoes. U-515 sank the accompanying destroyer tender Hecla and blew the stern off one of the escorting destroyers, Marne. She remained with the Mediterranean Fleet until 1944, when she was recalled to support the ships participating in Operation Overlord.

During this time she received her first radars. By August 1943 she mounted a Type 286 target indication set as well as a Type 285 anti-aircraft gunnery radar. By January 1944 she had received a Type 291 air warning radar. Her light AA armament had also been augmented by six Oerlikon 20 mm autocannon, three on each side of the roof of the large workshop abaft the funnel. In 1944 Vindictive was converted into a destroyer depot ship and her AA armament was reinforced by the addition of six more Oerlikons. Later that year, the 4-inch guns were removed and eight additional Oerlikons were added. In early August 1944, the ship was damaged by a long-range, circling, "Dackel" torpedo dropped by the Luftwaffe off the coast of Normandy. In 1945 she received an additional six Oerlikons. She was paid off into reserve on 8 September 1945 and was sold for scrap on 24 January 1946. Vindictive was subsequently broken up at Blyth.
