= Hawkins-class cruiser =

Class of five heavy cruisers of the Royal Navy, designed in 1915

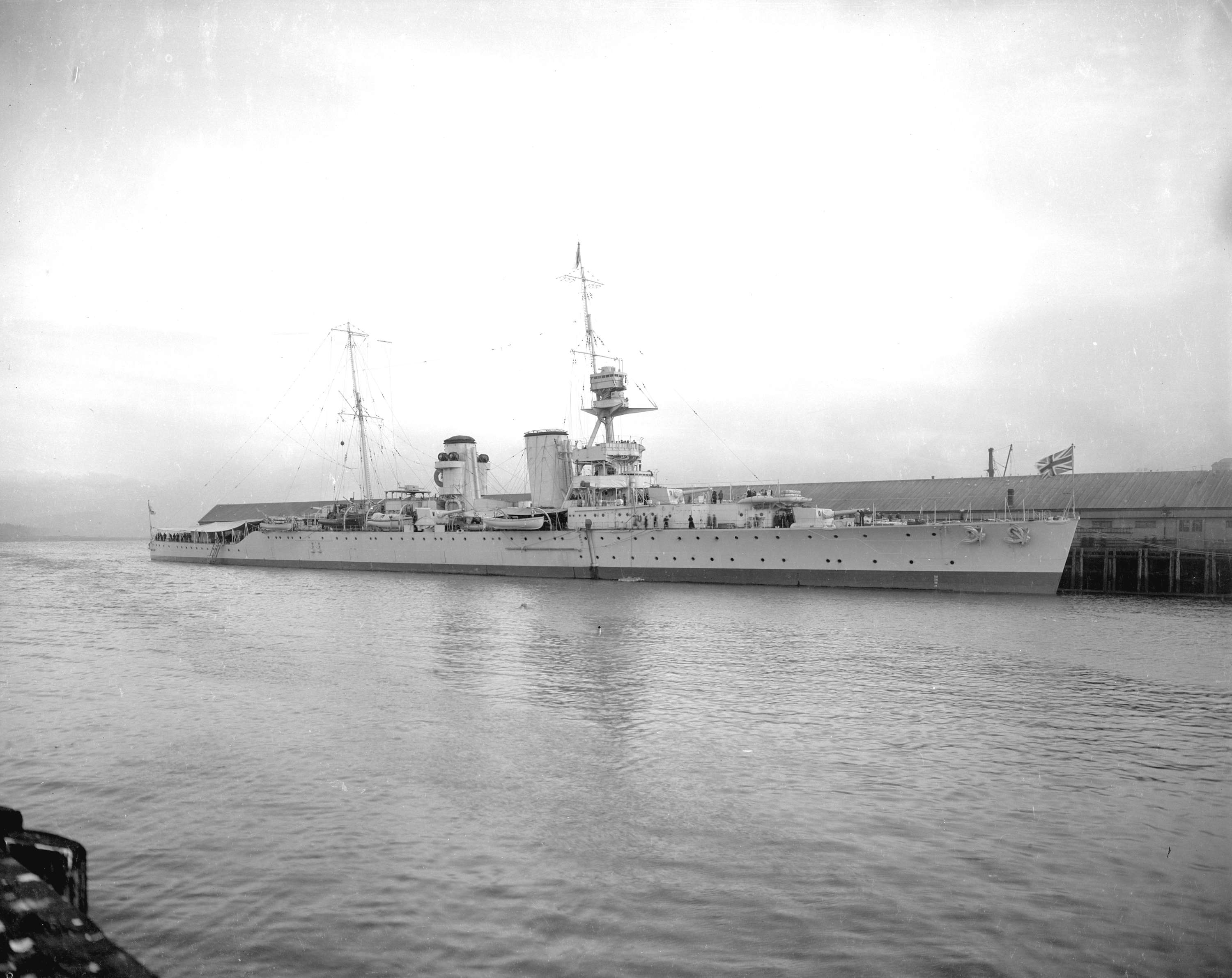
- Raleigh in Vancouver, Canada, December 1921

Class overview
- Name: Hawkins class
- Builders: Chatham Dockyard; Devonport Dockyard; Harland and Wolff; Portsmouth Dockyard; William Beardmore
- Operators: Royal Navy
- Preceded by: Town class
- Succeeded by: County class
- Built: 1916–1925
- In commission: 1919–1947
- Completed: 5
- Lost: 2
- Scrapped: 3

General characteristics
- Type: Heavy cruiser
- Displacement: 9,800–9,860 long tons (9,960–10,020 t) (standard); 12,110–12,300 long tons (12,300–12,500 t) (deep load)
- Length: 605 ft (184.4 m)(o/a)
- Beam: 65 ft (19.8 m)
- Draught: 19 ft 3 in (5.9 m) (deep load)
- Installed power: 10–12 Yarrow boilers; 60,000–70,000 shp (45,000–52,000 kW)
- Propulsion: 4 shafts; 4 × geared steam turbine sets
- Speed: 30–31 knots (56–57 km/h; 35–36 mph)
- Range: 5,640 nmi (10,450 km; 6,490 mi) at 10 knots (19 km/h; 12 mph)
- Complement: 709
- Armament: Hawkins and Raleigh: 7 × single 7.5 in (191 mm) guns; 6 × single 3 in (76 mm) low-angle guns; 4 × single 3 in AA guns; 2 × single 2 pdr (1.6 in (40 mm)) AA guns; 6 × 21 in (533 mm) torpedo tubes; Effingham and Frobisher: 7 × single 7.5 in guns; 3 × 4 in (102 mm) AA guns; 2 × single 2 pdr AA guns; 6 × 21 in torpedo tubes
- Armour: Belt: 1.5–3 in (3.8–7.6 cm); Deck: 1–1.5 in (2.5–3.8 cm); Gun shields: 1 in (2.5 cm)

General characteristics (Vindictive)
- Type: Aircraft carrier
- Displacement: 9,996 long tons (10,156 t) (standard)
- Installed power: 12 Yarrow boilers; 60,000 shp
- Speed: 30 knots (56 km/h; 35 mph)
- Armament: 4 × single 7.5 in guns; 4 × single 3 in low-angle guns; 4 × single 3 in AA guns; 2 × single 2 pdr AA guns; 6 × 21 in torpedo tubes
- Aircraft carried: 6–12 aircraft

The Hawkins class consisted of five heavy cruisers built for the Royal Navy during the First World War, although none of them saw service during the war. The first ship to be completed, HMS Vindictive, was renamed from HMS Cavendish and converted into an aircraft carrier while under construction. All ships were named after Elizabethan sea captains. The three ships remaining as cruisers in 1939 served in the Second World War, with Effingham being an early war loss through wreck; Raleigh had been lost in a similar shipwreck on uncharted rocks in 1922 (and Vindictive was nearly lost to grounding in 1919). Vindictive, though no longer a cruiser, also served throughout the War. This class formed the basis for the definition of the maximum cruiser type under the Washington Naval Treaty of 1922.

== Design ==
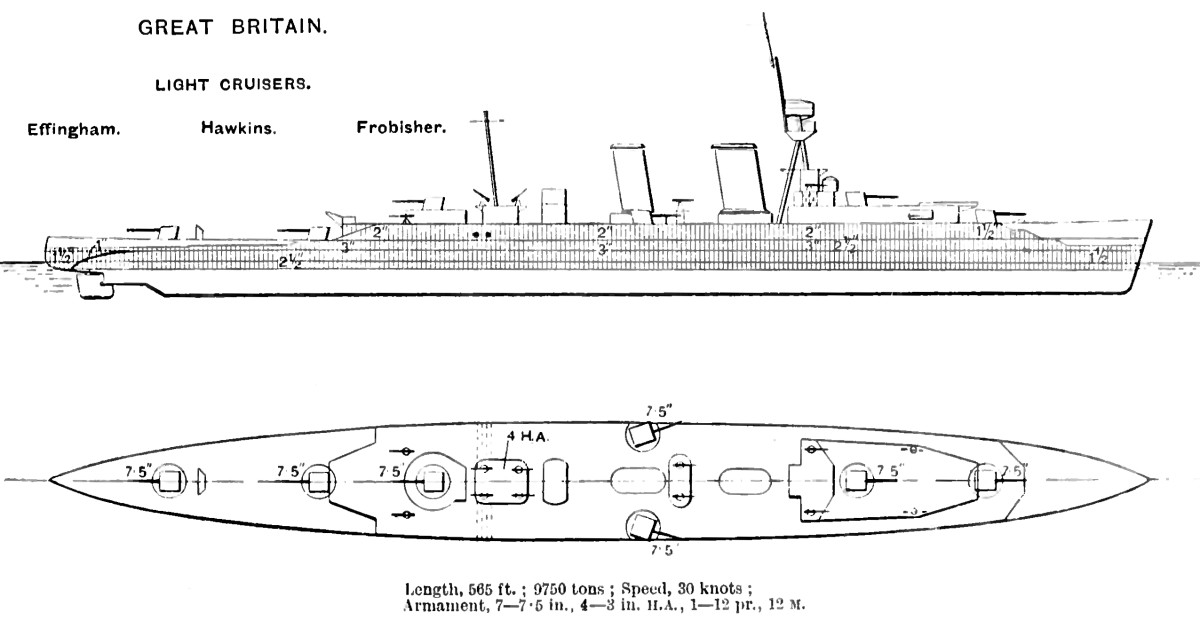
Right elevation and deck plan as depicted in Brassey's Naval Annual 1923

Although the Hawkins class are sometimes named as the "Improved Birminghams", referring to the Birmingham sub-class of the Town-class light cruisers, their design was based on a proposal by the Director of Naval Construction, Eustace Tennyson d'Eyncourt, in 1912–1913. Reacting to rumours of large German cruisers armed with 6.9-inch (175 mm) guns for overseas service and the need to replace the elderly armoured cruisers deployed abroad, d'Eyncourt proposed an oil-fuelled and lightly armoured ship of 7,500 long tons (7,600 t) capable of 26 knots (48 km/h; 30 mph) and armed with 7.5-inch (191 mm) guns in turrets. Referring the design as a "Light Cruiser for Atlantic Service", he optimised the design for good seakeeping performance for hunting down commerce raiders by giving it a deep draught and high freeboard.

Winston Churchill, First Lord of the Admiralty, objected to the size and cost of the ship and asked for a smaller and faster design armed with a mix of 6-inch (152 mm) and 7.5-inch guns, capable of 27.5 knots (50.9 km/h; 31.6 mph) using oil and a version of the new design using a mix of coal and oil as in the Birminghams in August 1913. The oil-fuelled design was estimated to cost £550,000, compared to the original's £700,000, while the mixed-fuel ship was priced at £590,000. Nothing further was done with the designs as the naval construction budget was already badly stretched.

In the early months of the First World War, German commerce-raiding warships and armed merchant cruisers seriously disrupted British seaborne trade as the need to form convoys or re-route ships to avoid areas that the raiders in which were operating seriously delayed sailings or lengthened voyages. Furthermore, the need to escort the convoys and to search for the raiders required large numbers of warships that were needed elsewhere, far out of proportion to numbers of raiders. On 12 October 1914 d'Eyncourt reiterated the arguments behind his "Atlantic Cruiser" proposal in a memo to the Board of Admiralty, adding that a fast mixed-fuel design with a large steaming radius would be very helpful for operations in remote areas where oil might not be available.

By early 1915 the threat had been neutralised or sunk, but the Royal Navy believed that further commerce-raiding operations were likely. On 9 June the board met to consider specifications for a large light cruiser capable of hunting down commerce raiders anywhere in the world. D'Eyncourt was subsequently requested to submit designs for a ship capable of 30 knots (56 km/h; 35 mph) with at least one-fifth power from coal-fired boilers and an armament of at least ten 6-inch guns. He submitted six sketch designs armed with various mixes of 6-, 7.5- and 9.2-inch (234 mm) guns using 9,000-long-ton (9,144 t) and 9,750-long-ton (9,906 t) hulls. Based on several encounters where the raiders had attempted to flee as soon as they had spotted the cruisers, the board believed that the ship's armament needed to be able to reach out to the visible horizon and be powerful enough to cripple the raider with a single hit. It therefore rejected the 6-inch gun as too short-ranged and lacking in power and the 9.2-inch gun as too few could be mounted on the hull; settling on the 7.5-inch gun in a new mount capable of 30° of elevation to maximise its range and carried on the larger of the two hulls proposed. The fruition of this design meant that with the 1930 London Naval Treaty the Hawkins class would become the Royal Navy's first heavy cruisers.

== Description ==
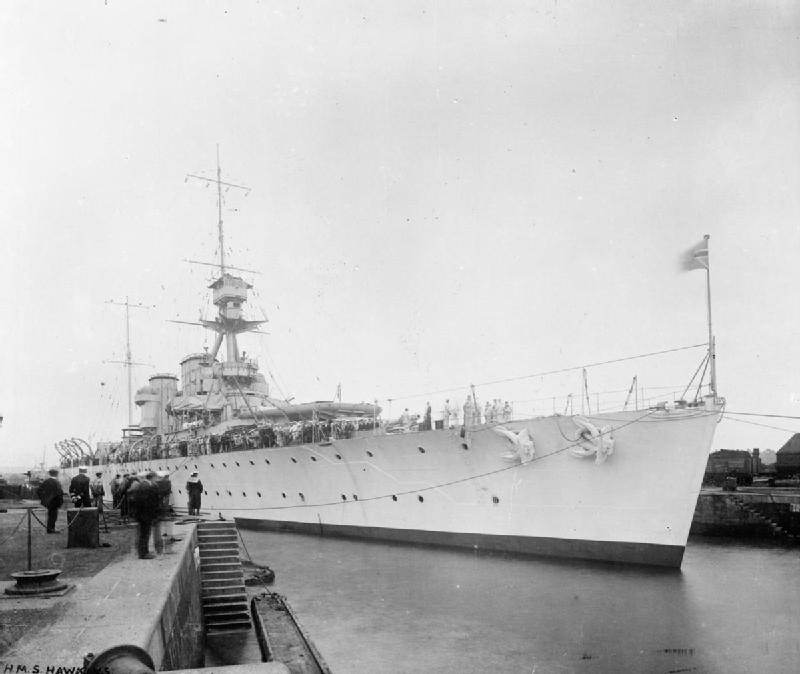
Hawkins in a dry dock, 1920–1935

The ships had an overall length of 605 feet (184.4 m), a beam of 65 feet (19.8 m) and a draught of 19 feet 3 inches (5.9 m) at deep load. They displaced 9,800–9,860 long tons (9,960–10,020 t) at standard load and 12,110–12,300 long tons (12,300–12,500 t) at deep load. The shape of the hull was based on that of the large light cruiser Furious with 5-foot (1.5 m) anti-torpedo bulges covering the engine and boiler rooms. Amidships, the hull had 10° of tumblehome, although the forward portion of the forecastle deck flared outwards to improve sea keeping. The ships had a metacentric height of 4–4.1 ft (1.2–1.2 m) at deep load. D'Eyncourt claimed that they were so subdivided that they could survive the flooding of two adjacent compartments. Their crew numbered 37 officers and 672 ratings.

The Hawkins class were equipped with four geared steam turbine sets, each driving one propeller shaft using steam provided by a dozen Yarrow boilers at a pressure of 235 psi (1,620 kPa; 17 kgf/cm^{2}), distributed between three boiler rooms. The fore and aft groups adopted a modern oil-fired design, but the four boilers in the middle compartment were coal-fired, so that cruising fuel could be easily obtained in foreign ports where oil was not available. The drawback being that they produced much less power, only generating one-sixth of the ships' total output. The steam from the boilers was ducted into two funnels, the uptakes from the coal-fired central group being split and trunked in with those from the oil-fired ones fore and aft. The turbines were rated at 60,000 shaft horsepower (45,000 kW) to give the ships a design speed of 30 knots. A fuel supply of 1,580 long tons (1,610 t) of fuel oil and 800 long tons (810 t) of coal was supposed to give a steaming range of 5,640 nautical miles (10,450 km; 6,490 mi) at 10 knots (19 km/h; 12 mph).

In the event, only Hawkins and Vindictive were completed with this engine installation. During her sea trials in 1919, Hawkins reached a speed of 28.7 knots (53.2 km/h; 33.0 mph) from about 61,000 shp (45,000 kW) at deep load, a slightly disappointing figure as she had been designed for 29 knots (54 km/h; 33 mph) at this displacement.

In November 1917 the Admiralty decided to replace the coal-fired boilers in the three least-advanced ships with four oil-fired ones, but only Raleigh actually received this modification, which increased her power to 70,000 shp (52,000 kW) for a theoretical 31 knots (57 km/h; 36 mph). The following year, Raleigh reached her designed speed during her trials. Effingham and Frobisher exchanged their coal-fired boilers for a single pair of oil-fired boilers which gave them 65,000 shp (48,000 kW) for a design speed of 30.5 knots (56.5 km/h; 35.1 mph). These three ships stowed 2,186 long tons (2,221 t) of oil which was designed to give them the same range of 5,640 nautical miles (10,450 km; 6,490 mi) at 10 knots (19 km/h; 12 mph). The ships' machinery arrangements would be further modified in later refits and reconstructions.

=== Armament ===
The main armament of the Hawkins-class ships consisted of seven 45-calibre 7.5-inch (191 mm) Mk VI guns in single mounts protected by 1-inch (25 mm) gun shields. The guns fired 200-pound (91 kg) projectiles at a muzzle velocity of 2,770 ft/s (840 m/s) to their maximum range of 21,114 yards (19,307 m). The ships stowed 150 rounds per gun. The mounts were initially hand-worked, but they were refitted with power-operated elevation and traverse motors after the war. Powered-loading gear was never fitted and the guns could only be hand-loaded up to 10° elevation. The requirements for long lines of ammunition-handlers, physically passing rounds and cartridges along the deck from the shell-hoist to each gun (and in the case of the superfiring forward gun, physically passing them up from one deck to the next) were particularly inconvenient, and in terms of manpower, were described as "absurdly out of proportion" to the ship's cruiser role and firepower.

The ships were arranged with five guns on the centreline, four of which were in superfiring pairs fore and aft of the superstructure, the fifth gun was further aft on the quarterdeck, and the last two as wing guns abreast the aft funnel. To make room for her flight decks, HMS Vindictive was completed with just four guns, one forward, two in the wing positions, and one right aft. Further revisions to the number and layout of the main guns would be made subsequently.

Vindictive, Raleigh and Hawkins had their guns controlled by a mechanical Mark I Dreyer Fire-control Table. It used data provided by the 15-foot (4.6 m) coincidence rangefinder in the pedestal-type gunnery director positioned under the spotting top at the head of the tripod mast. The ships were also fitted with one 12-foot (3.7 m) and a 9-foot (2.7 m) rangefinder. Effingham and Frobisher were fitted with a Mark III Dreyer Fire-control Table and three 12-foot rangefinders.

The secondary armament of the class was intended to consist of ten 3-inch (76 mm) 20 cwt Mk I guns. (Note: "Cwt" is the abbreviation for hundredweight, 20 cwt referring to the weight of the gun.) Six of these were in low-angle mounts to defend against torpedo boat attack, two in casemates between the forward 7.5-inch guns, another pair on platforms abreast the conning tower and two on a platform between the funnels. The last four served as anti-aircraft (AA) guns and were positioned further aft around the base of the main mast. They fired 12.5-pound (5.7 kg) shells at a muzzle velocity of 2,604 ft/s (794 m/s). Each gun was provided with 300 rounds.

In practice, the secondary armament of each ship varied. At most, only Hawkins and Raleigh completed with the intended guns, and if so, they were promptly modified. No low-angle guns were fitted in Effingham or Frobisher and their high-angle guns were replaced by three 4-inch (102 mm) Mk V guns on high-angle HA Mark III mountings. A pair of these were positioned at the base of the main mast and the third gun was on the quarterdeck. At an elevation of +30°, their 31-pound (14.1 kg) shells had a range of 13,600 yd (12,436 m) at a muzzle velocity of 2,613 ft/s (796 m/s). The rest of their anti-aircraft suite consisted of a pair of 2-pounder (1.6-inch (40 mm)) AA guns that were added during construction. The Hawkins-class ships were designed with a submerged 21-inch (533 mm) torpedo tube on each broadside, but two above-water torpedo tubes were added below the base of the main mast during construction on each broadside.

=== Armour ===
The Hawkins class were protected by a full-length waterline armoured belt of high-tensile steel (HTS) that covered most of the ships' sides. It was thickest over the boiler and engine rooms, ranging from 1.5 to 3 inches (38 to 76 mm) thick. Their magazines were protected by an additional 0.5 to 1 inch (13 to 25 mm) of HTS. There was a 1-inch aft transverse bulkhead of mild steel and the conning tower was protected by 3-inch HTS plates. The ships' deck protection consisted of 1- to 1.5-inch HTS.

== Cavendish as an aircraft carrier ==
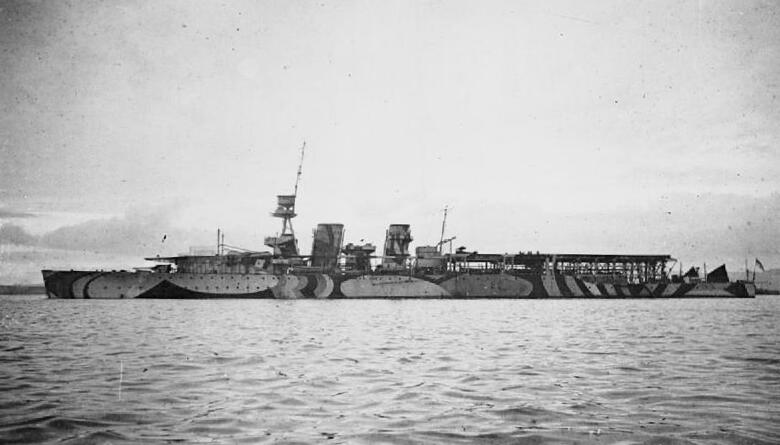
Vindictive shortly after completion

In January 1917, the Admiralty reviewed the navy's aircraft carrier requirements and decided to order two ships fitted with a flying-off deck as well as a landing deck aft. The initial order had to be cancelled in April 1917 for lack of building facilities, so the Admiralty decided to convert Cavendish, already under construction, in June 1917. She was renamed Vindictive to perpetuate the name of the cruiser sunk at the Second Ostend Raid and her construction was rushed to bring her into service before her cruiser sisters.

The forward superfiring 7.5-inch gun, two 3-inch guns and the conning tower were removed and the forward superstructure was remodelled into a 78-by-49-foot (23.8 by 14.9 m) hangar with a capacity for six reconnaissance aircraft. The hangar roof, with a small extension, formed the 106-foot (32.3 m) flying-off deck. The aircraft were hoisted up through a hatch at the aft end of the flying-off deck by two derricks. The 193 by 57 feet (58.8 by 17.4 m) landing deck required the removal of the aft superfiring pair of 7.5-inch guns and moving the four 3-inch AA guns to an elevated platform between the funnels, in lieu of the 3-inch guns intended for that position. A port side gangway 8 feet (2.4 m) wide connected the landing and flying-off decks to allow aircraft with their wings folded to be wheeled from one to the other. A crash barrier was hung from "the gallows" at the forward end of the landing on deck. To increase her stability after the addition of so much topweight, the upper portion of her anti-torpedo bulge was enlarged. She completed her sea trials on 21 September 1918 and reached a speed of 29.12 knots (53.93 km/h; 33.51 mph) from 63,600 shp (47,400 kW).

== Modifications ==
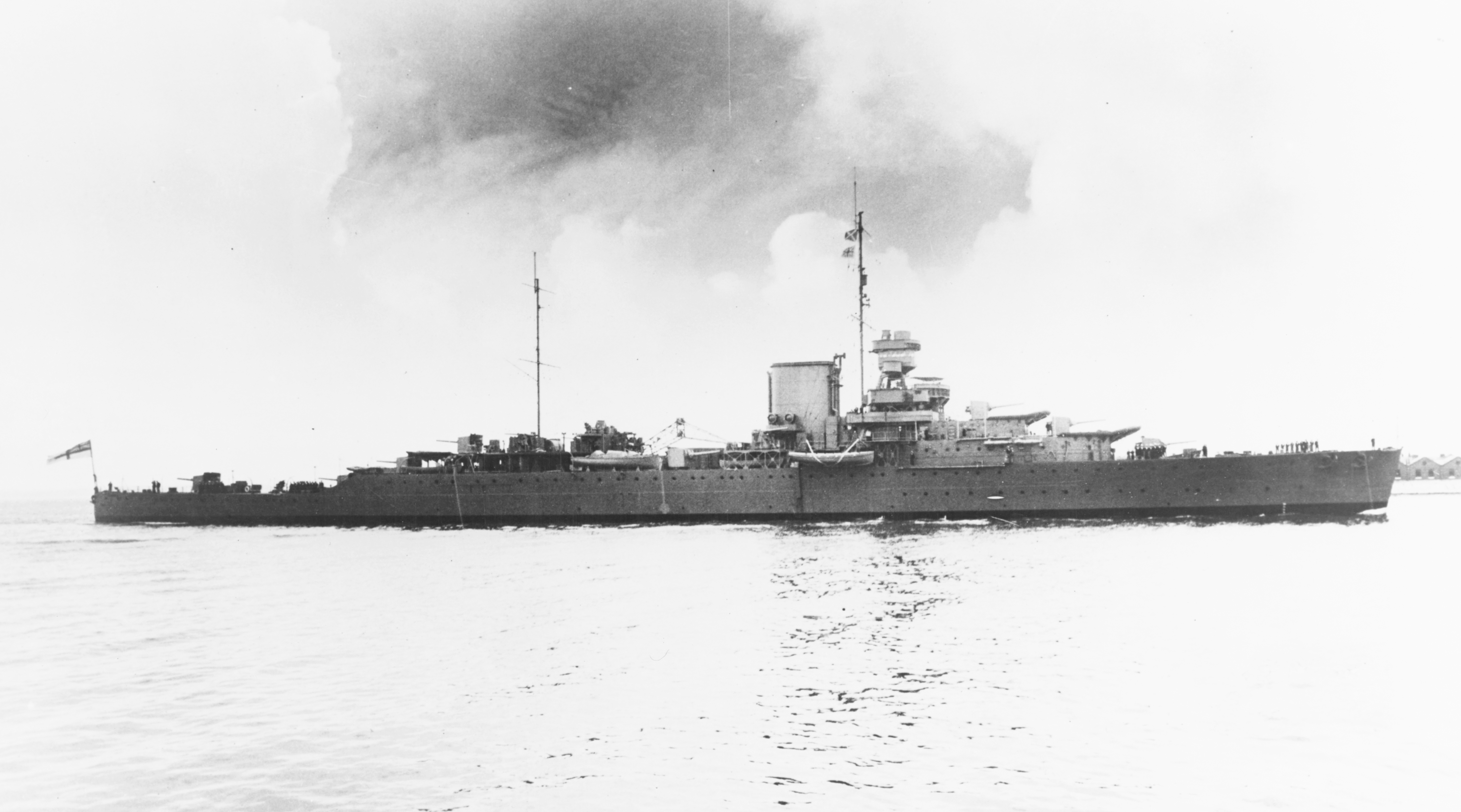
Effingham after being modernised

The earliest modification related to the secondary armament. The low-angle guns were all gone by 1921, leaving Hawkins with only her four 12-pounder anti-aircraft (A/A) guns, while Raleigh seems to have obtained two QF 4-inch Mark V guns in their stead.

The first major refit to the class came in 1923, when Vindictive was converted back into a cruiser configuration - but the hangar beneath her bridge was retained, and in place of 'B' gun, she had a prototype aircraft catapult, enabling her to carry six Fairey IIID floatplanes on active service. Her revised gun armament thus consisted of six rather than seven 7.5-inch guns (a single 'A' gun forward, two on the wing mountings, and 'X', 'Y' and 'Z' aft - though only the 'X' and 'Y' mountings were actually additions to her armament, the rest having been carried by her as a carrier), and a revised anti-aircraft configuration of three 4-inch guns like Frobisher and Effingham.

In 1925, it was suggested that Frobisher and Effingham could be rearmed to carry six 8-inch (203 mm) guns in the same modern twin-turrets used on the new County-class cruisers then building, giving ships of comparable firepower for a fraction of the cost, and a similar reconstruction of the partially coal-fired Hawkins could also be used to upgrade her boilers (Vindictive was excluded as her aircraft catapult was considered a valuable asset); but the proposal was rejected - the existing turret design produced for the new cruisers could not be used in the aft position on the older ships, their protection against long-range gunfire was weak, there were concerns with staying within the 10,000-ton weight limit, and the Admiralty reported that it would be difficult and costly to find substitutes to take over their duties while they were being rebuilt.

Instead, Hawkins underwent a more limited refit in 1929, in which her coal-fired boilers were simply removed and her remaining eight boilers were uprated to 55,000 shaft horsepower (41,000 kW), though this would have had the effect of reducing her top speed. She also had her anomalous secondary armament of four 12-pounder guns replaced by an equal number of the same 4-inch (102 mm) Mark V guns used by her sisters.

In 1930, another modernisation plan was proposed, which would re-arm the class with eight 6-inch (152 mm) guns in twin turrets, similar to the new Leander-class light cruiser. This would have been easier to achieve than the earlier proposal for twin 8-inch turrets, but again, nothing was done. The British government was placing a strong emphasis on establishing agreed limits on heavy cruiser numbers in the word's major navies, and an offer to remove the Hawkins class from service was instrumental in obtaining the London Naval Treaty, which implicitly accepted that they would all be removed from service by 1936. Simply converting them into modern light cruisers would hardly have honoured the spirit of the agreement.

The Hawkins class were not scrapped, however. Instead, they were retained by the expedient of reclassifying them as training ships. As a first step, Frobisher was reclassified in 1932, and one of her aft guns and two of her 4-inch guns were removed; in 1935, the upper aft gun was replaced by an aircraft catapult, and in 1936, to conform more closely with the agreement, her armament was reduced to a single 4.7-inch (120 mm) gun. In 1937, Vindictive was specially demilitarised with a more substantial conversion; not only was her armament reduced to two 4.7-inch guns forward and a pom-pom aft, but her inboard propellers and the associated turbines were removed, along with the associated boilers and aft funnel, reducing her speed to 24 knots. A reworked superstructure provided cadet accommodation, while the empty aft boiler room became a laundry, and her fuel reserve dropped to 1,000 long tons (1,000 t). Hawkins was simply disarmed and laid up.

In 1937 Effingham began substantial reconstruction, which saw her converted into a light cruiser, albeit of a more old-fashioned configuration with nine BL 6-inch Mark XII guns on single mountings CP Mark XIV. This was achieved by rebuilding the superstructure to increase the number of superfiring positions fore and aft from two to three, designated 'A', 'B' and 'C' and 'W', 'X' and 'Y' respectively, while retaining the guns on either wing, and the one right astern on the quarterdeck in position 'Z'. Secondary armament became eight QF 4-inch Mark XVI gun in four twin-gun HA/LA Mark XIX in mounting, eight QF 2-pounder Mark VIII guns in two quadruple mounts and twelve Vickers 0.5 in (12.7 mm) in three quadruple mounts. The submerged torpedo tubes and the after boiler rooms were removed, but they were replaced with extra fuel storage, and after modifications to her remaining machinery, her total output was only slightly reduced to 61,000 shp (45,000 kW). Externally, the remaining uptakes were trunked into a single large funnel. She had a new bridge, her original tripod mast and spotting top were replaced by a straight pole mast, and carried a crane amidships designed for a reconnaissance aircraft, although it is not clear if the associated catapult was ever been fitted, and probably no aircraft was ever carried.

In 1939, Vindictive entered dock for what was supposed to be a reconstruction into a similar configuration, but work proceeded slowly, and given the extensive modifications to her machinery, it was decided to simplify her reconstruction. By October 1939, she was considered for a modest rearmament with four 6-inch guns in 'A' and 'B' positions forward and 'X' and 'Y' aft, with an option to add additional guns on the wing mountings later; an anti-aircraft armament of three 4-inch guns with destroyer-style fire-control and four single 2pdr guns was proposed, and although the extra topweight was expected to reduce her top speed to 23 knots, it was hoped that the laundry would be converted into fuel storage, which would increase her range. In the event, it was decided that she could be more usefully (and very quickly) refitted as a repair ship, eventually armed with six 4-inch (102 mm) guns, two quadruple pom-poms, and a number of 20-millimetre (0.8 in) Oerlikon autocannons.

It had also been planned to rebuild Hawkins and Frobisher on similar lines to Effingham, but other priorities prevented this. They were simply re-armed for war with their original 7.5-inch (191 mm) guns. Hawkins recommissioned in 1940 with her original main armament restored, and a revised secondary armament of four 4-inch AA guns, two quadruple 2-pounder "pom-pom" mountings and eight 20mm Oerlikons on single mounts. In contrast, Frobisher never regained her wing guns, and this allowed the gun deck carrying her 4-inch (102 mm) anti-aircraft guns to be extended out to the ship's sides, and their number to be increased to five (two on each side amidships and the one aft on her quarterdeck); she was at one point supposed to get two quadruple pom-poms, two single 2-pounders, and three Oerlikon guns, but slow progress on her refit meant that these were revised to four quadruple pom-poms and seven Oerlikons before she emerged in 1942. The underwater torpedo tubes were removed, but she now had a quadruple mounting in the open-deck position.

Frobisher also lost the catapult-aircraft facilities she had been given in 1935. Both ships received an outfit of centimetric Radar Type 273 target indication on the bridge, Type 286 air warning at the mastheads, Type 275 on the HACS 4-inch (102 mm) gun director for ranging and bearing and, in Frobisher only, a pair of Type 282 sets on the pom-pom directors on the bridge. Further wartime additions modified the anti-aircraft armament, generally strengthening the pom-pom arrangements and increasing the number of 20 mm guns.

A final refit was given to Frobisher in 1944–1945, when she was converted back into a training ship, with three 7.5-inch guns in 'A', 'Y' and 'Z' positions and a single 4-inch AA gun in the superfiring 'B' position forward, plus a reduced number of Oerlikons and some machine guns, and her quadruple torpedo tubes.

== Ships ==
Construction data
Name	Namesake	Builder	Laid down	Launched	Commissioned	Fate
Hawkins	John Hawkins	HM Dockyard, Chatham	3 June 1916	1 October 1917	19 July 1919	Broken up at Dalmuir, 1947
Raleigh	Walter Raleigh	William Beardmore & Company, Dalmuir	4 October 1916	28 August 1919	July 1921	Ran aground at Point Amour, Forteau Bay, Labrador, 8 August 1922; Demolished, September 1926.
Frobisher	Martin Frobisher	HM Dockyard, Devonport	2 August 1916	20 March 1920	3 October 1924	Broken up at Newport, 1949
Effingham	Charles Howard, Lord Effingham	HM Dockyard, Portsmouth	2 April 1917	8 June 1921	9 July 1925	Wrecked Faksen Shoal, Bodø, Norway, 18 May 1940; Sunk by torpedo from HMS Echo, 19 May 1940
Cavendish	Thomas Cavendish	Harland & Wolff, Belfast	29 May 1916	17 January 1918	1 October 1918	Converted to an aircraft carrier and renamed Vindictive, June 1917; Broken up at Blyth, 1946

== Service ==
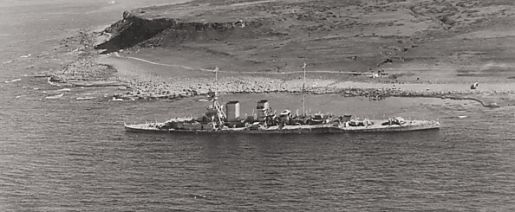
Raleigh grounded on Point Amour in 1922

- Raleigh had the shortest career of any ship of the class, spending just one year in commission before being wrecked and subsequently broken up.
- Effingham was an early war loss, during the Norwegian campaign; grounding on an uncharted shoal, she had to be destroyed by friendly forces.
- Hawkins served in World War II as a convoy escort in the Indian Ocean, and provided gunfire support during the Normandy landings.
- Frobisher served in World War II as a convoy escort and a depot ship for the Normandy landings. After torpedo damage in an E-boat attack, the ship was refitted in 1944-1945 for a training role, with a corresponding reduction in armament.
- Vindictive served in two World Wars, in a wide variety of roles, finally being scrapped in 1946.
