= HMS Effingham =

British Hawkins-class heavy cruiser

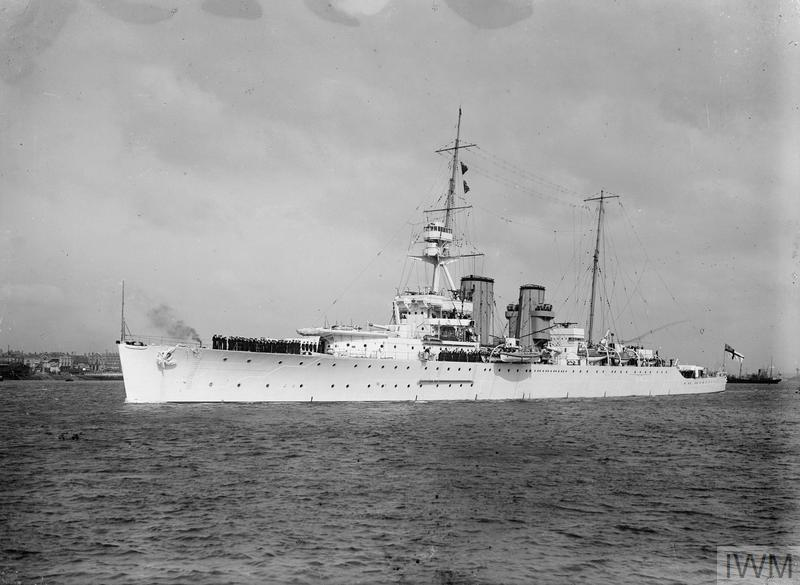
- Effingham between 1925 and 1936

History

United Kingdom
- Name: Effingham
- Namesake: Lord Howard of Effingham
- Ordered: December 1915
- Builder: HM Dockyard, Portsmouth
- Laid down: 6 April 1917
- Launched: 8 June 1921
- Completed: July 1925
- Identification: Pennant number: 98 (1925); I98 (1938); D98 (1940)
- Fate: Wrecked off Bodø, Norway, 18 May 1940

General characteristics (as built)
- Class & type: Hawkins-class heavy cruiser
- Displacement: 9,860 long tons (10,020 t) (standard); 12,800 long tons (13,000 t) (deep load)
- Length: 604 ft 10 in (184.4 m) (o/a)
- Beam: 65 ft (19.8 m)
- Draught: 19 ft 3 in (5.9 m) (deep load)
- Installed power: 10 × Yarrow boilers; 65,000 shp (48,000 kW)
- Propulsion: 4 × shafts; 4 × geared steam turbines
- Speed: 30.5 knots (56.5 km/h; 35.1 mph)
- Range: 5,640 nmi (10,450 km; 6,490 mi) at 10 knots (19 km/h; 12 mph)
- Complement: 690
- Armament: 7 × single 7.5 in (191 mm) guns; 3 × single 4 in (102 mm) AA guns; 2 × single 2-pdr (1.6 in (40 mm)) AA guns; 6 × 21 in (533 mm) torpedo tubes
- Armour: Belt: 1.5–3 in (3.8–7.6 cm); Deck: 1–1.5 in (2.5–3.8 cm); Gun shields: 1 in (2.5 cm)

General characteristics (1938)
- Installed power: 8 × Yarrow boilers; 61,000 shp (45,000 kW)
- Speed: 29 knots (54 km/h; 33 mph)
- Range: 5,410 nmi (10,020 km; 6,230 mi) at 14 knots (26 km/h; 16 mph)
- Complement: over 800
- Armament: 9 × single 6 in (152 mm) guns; 4 × single 4 in AA guns; 3 × quadruple 0.5 in (12.7 mm) AA machine guns; 4 × 21 in torpedo tubes

HMS Effingham was one of five Hawkins-class heavy cruisers built for the Royal Navy during the First World War. She was not finished during the war and construction proceeded very slowly after the end of the war in 1918. Completed in 1925, the ship was assigned to the East Indies Station, sometimes serving as a flagship. She returned home in 1932 and was assigned to the Reserve Fleet as its flagship for the next four years. Effingham was rearmed and modernized in 1937–1938 and then resumed her previous role.

When the Second World War began in September 1939, Effingham was assigned to the Northern Patrol, but severe engine problems caused her to spend most of the next six months under repair. In between dockyard visits, the ship ferried a load of gold bullion to Canada and was briefly assigned to the North America and West Indies Station. After a lengthy refit at the beginning of 1940, Effingham supported Allied troops during the Norwegian Campaign, mostly bombarding German positions and providing naval gunfire support to troops ashore. While ferrying troops and supplies to Bodø on 18 May, the ship struck a shoal due to a navigational error and sank in shallow water. Her crew was evacuated without loss and the cruiser destroyed by a pair of torpedoes from an accompanying destroyer. Her wreck was salvaged after the war with only some minor wreckage remaining.

== Design and description ==
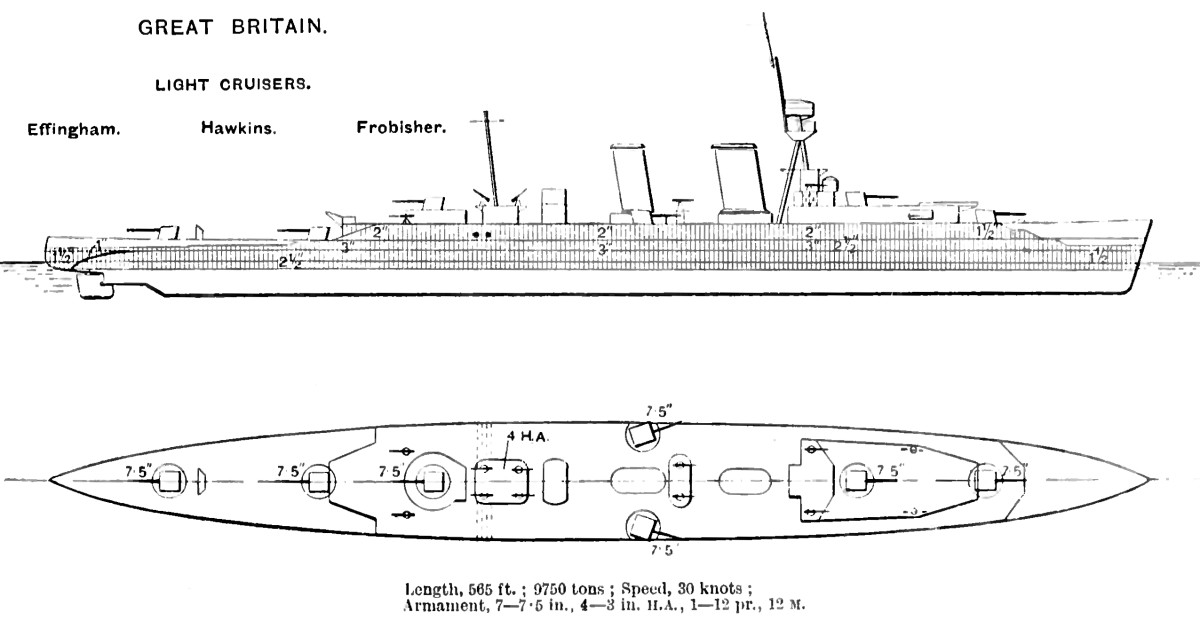
Right plan and elevation from Brassey's Naval Annual 1923

The Hawkins-class cruisers were designed to be able to hunt down commerce raiders in the open ocean, for which they needed a heavy armament, high speed and long range. Effingham had an overall length of 604 feet 10 inches (184.4 m), a beam of 65 feet (19.8 m) and a draught of 19 feet 3 inches (5.9 m) at deep load. The ship displaced 9,860 long tons (10,020 t) at (standard load) and 12,190 long tons (12,390 t) at deep load. Her crew numbered 690 officers and ratings.

The ships were originally designed with 60,000-shaft-horsepower (45,000 kW) propulsion machinery, but the Admiralty decided in 1917 to replace their four coal-fired boilers with more powerful oil-burning ones. This change could only be applied to the three least-advanced ships, including Effingham, although she did not receive the full upgrade. The ship was powered by four Brown-Curtis geared steam turbine sets, each driving one propeller shaft using steam provided by 10 Yarrow boilers that were ducted into two funnels. The turbines were rated at 65,000 shp (48,000 kW) for a speed of 30.5 knots (56.5 km/h; 35.1 mph). Effingham carried 2,186 long tons (2,221 t) of fuel oil to give her a range of 5,640 nautical miles (10,450 km; 6,490 mi) at 10 knots (19 km/h; 12 mph).

The main armament of the Hawkins-class ships consisted of seven 7.5-inch (191 mm) Mk VI guns in single mounts protected by 1-inch (25 mm) gun shields. They were arranged with five guns on the centreline, four of which were in superfiring pairs fore and aft of the superstructure, the fifth gun was further aft on the quarterdeck, and the last two as wing guns abreast the aft funnel. Their anti-aircraft suite consisted of three 4-inch (102 mm) Mk V guns and a pair of two-pounder (1.6-inch (40 mm)) guns. Two of the Mk V guns were positioned at the base of the mainmast and the third gun was on the quarterdeck. The two-pounders were mounted on a platform between the funnels. The ships were also fitted with six 21-inch (533 mm) torpedo tubes, one submerged and two above water on each broadside.

Effinham's guns were controlled by a mechanical Mark III Dreyer Fire-control Table. It used data provided by the 15-foot (4.6 m) coincidence rangefinder in the gunnery director positioned under the spotting top at the head of the tripod mast. The ship was also fitted with three 12-foot (3.7 m) rangefinders.

The Hawkins class were protected by a full-length waterline armoured belt that covered most of the ships' sides. It was thickest over the boiler and engine rooms, ranging from 1.5 to 3 inches (38 to 76 mm) thick. Their magazines were protected by an additional 0.5 to 1 inch (13 to 25 mm) of armour. There was a 1-inch aft transverse bulkhead and the conning tower was protected by 3-inch armour plates. The ships' deck protection consisted of 1 to 1.5 inches of high-tensile steel.

=== Modernisation ===
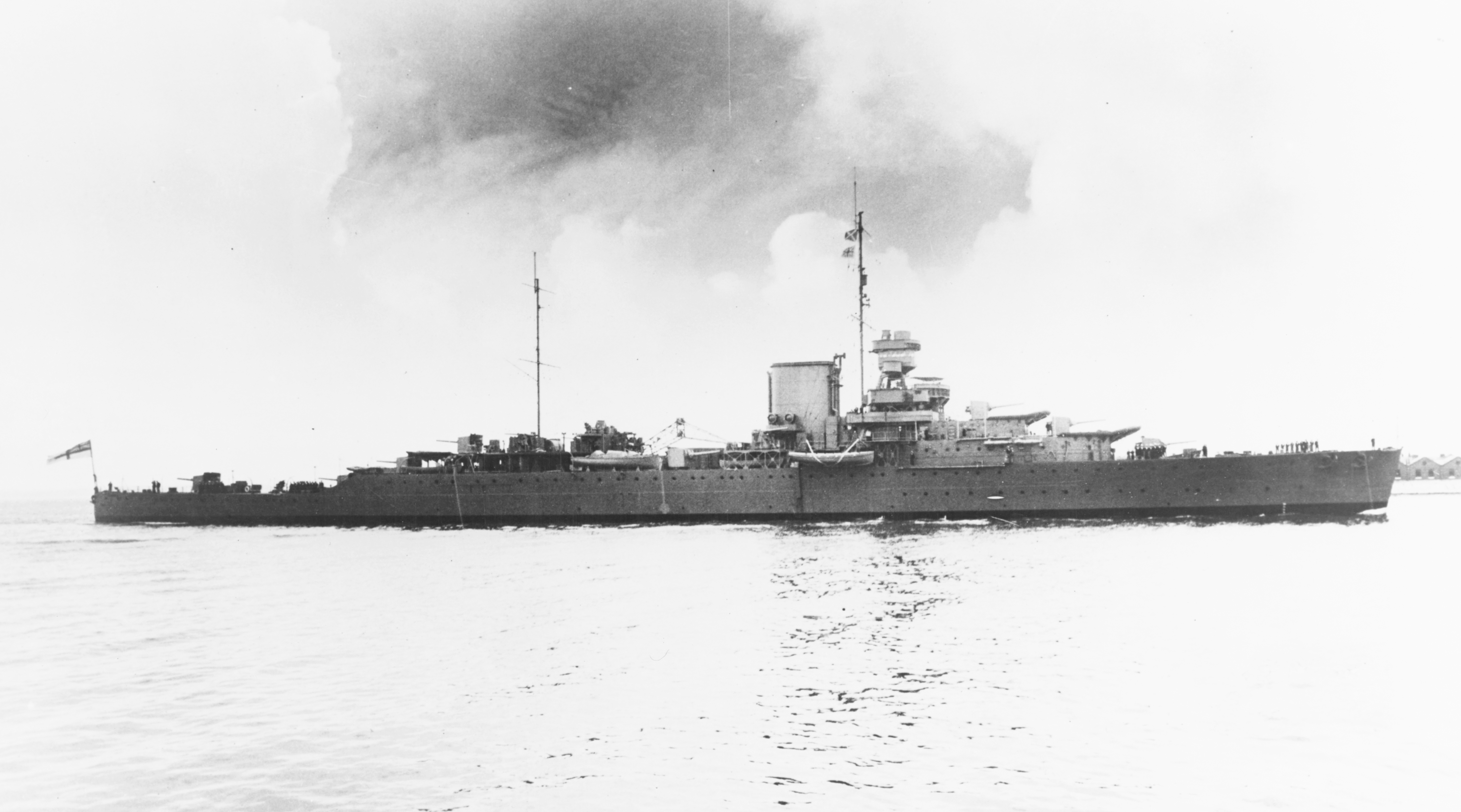
Effingham after her modernization in 1938

The London Naval Treaty of 1930 had placed a limit on the number of cruisers with an armament greater than 6.1 in (155 mm) and the Hawkins class were due to be demilitarized by December 1936 to avoid exceeding the allotted number of 15 heavy cruisers. The ships were still in good shape and could usefully remain in service if rearmed with smaller guns. Effingham was chosen to be the lead ship in the modernisation programme, using the spare six-inch (152 mm) Mark XII guns from the light cruisers Coventry and Curlew that were being rearmed and converted into anti-aircraft cruisers.

In 1937–1938 all of the ship's existing guns were removed, as were her pair of underwater torpedo tubes, and the forward superstructure and bridge was rebuilt to accommodate nine 6-inch guns in two superfiring trios fore and aft of the superstructure, plus one gun further aft on the quarterdeck and one more on each broadside. At their maximum elevation of +30°, the guns had a range of 18,750 yd (17,140 m). Effingham's anti-aircraft armament was increased to four Mk V guns and the two-pounders were replaced by three quadruple mounts for Vickers 0.5 in (12.7 mm) AA machine guns. Her aft pair of boilers were removed and the aft boiler room was converted into an oil tank, which increased her oil storage to 2,620 long tons (2,660 t) and her range to 5,410 nmi (10,020 km; 6,230 mi) at 14 knots (26 km/h; 16 mph).

The removal of the two boilers reduced her total horsepower to 61,000 shp (45,000 kW) and her speed about 29 knots (54 km/h; 33 mph), although her boilers were re-tubed during the modernization. The conversion of the aft boiler room into an oil tank rendered her aft funnel redundant and her existing forward funnel was enlarged. This made space available amidships for a E.IV.H catapult and an aircraft-handling crane, although the catapult and its intended Supermarine Walrus flying boat were not fitted at that time. The spotting top was rebuilt and the gunnery director was moved to its roof. Provision was made for one Mk III* High-Angle Control System (HACS) on the spotting top roof and another amidships, although they were not installed until a refit in mid-1939. Provision was also made for a pair of octuple mounts for two-pounder Mk VIII "pom-poms" and their directors, but they were not installed until another refit in early 1940. The 1939 refit also saw the replacement of the Mk V AA guns by four twin-gun mounts for four-inch Mk XVI dual-purpose guns. All these changes increased the ship's wartime crew to over 800 men.

== Construction and career ==
Effingham, named after the Lord High Admiral Lord Howard of Effingham, one of the leaders of the fleet that defeated the Spanish Armada in 1587, has been the only ship of her name to serve in the Royal Navy. The ship was laid down by HM Dockyard, Portsmouth, on 6 April 1917, launched on 8 June 1921 and completed in July 1925, with Captain Cecil Reyne in command. She was assigned to the 4th Light Cruiser Squadron (LCS) on the East Indies Station after working up. Captain Bruce Fraser (later First Sea Lord) assumed command of the ship in September 1929. Representatives from Effingham attended the coronation of the Emperor of Ethiopia, Haile Selassie, on 2 November 1930 and her Royal Marine band provided entertainment during the affair. On 14 June 1932 the ship briefly became the flagship of Rear-Admiral Martin Dunbar-Nasmith, Commander-in-Chief of the East Indies Station, but he hauled his flag down on 1 October and the cruiser rejoined the 4th LCS. After a cruise in the Bay of Bengal in March–April 1933, Effingham returned home.

On 30 July she became flagship of the Reserve Fleet when Vice-Admiral William Munro Kerr hoisted his flag aboard her. Kerr was relieved by Vice-Admiral Edward Astley-Rushton. After the former's premature death in June 1935, Vice-Admiral Gerald Charles Dickens assumed command on 28 June. The ship was present at the Silver Jubilee Fleet Review for King George V on 16 July. She became a private ship on 29 September 1936 in anticipation of her modernisation.

Effingham recommissioned on 15 June 1938 with Captain Bernard Warburton-Lee in command and became the flagship of Vice-Admiral Max Horton, Commander-in-Chief, Reserve Fleet. Captain John Howson relieved Warburton-Lee on 17 April 1939. At some point during the year before August, the ship received her missing HACS directors and exchanged her single four-inch guns for new twin-gun mounts. On 9 August she hosted King George VI as he met the captains of sixty ships during his review of the recommissioned Reserve Fleet in Weymouth Bay. She remained in commission after the review and began working up. Effingham arrived at the naval base in Scapa Flow on 25 August and was assigned to the 12th Cruiser Squadron. The ship remained Horton's flagship as he assumed command of the Northern Patrol which was tasked with intercepting German ships attempting to reach home before the declaration of war.

=== World War II service ===
After the British declared war on Germany on 3 September, the Northern Patrol's tasks expanded to include intercepting any German commerce raiders attempting to breakout into the Atlantic. Effingham was damaged during her first patrol on 6 September and arrived at HM Dockyard, Devonport on 3 October for repairs that lasted until the 9th. The ship relieved the heavy cruiser Berwick escorting Convoy KJ-3 six days later, but had to return to Devonport on the 25th for engine repairs. A boiler cleaning lasted until 7 November when she loaded £2 million in gold for transport to Halifax, Nova Scotia, Canada. After arriving 10 days later, Howson was appointed Senior Naval Officer, West Indies Patrol and Effingham sailed south to Bermuda on the 24th, together with the Australian light cruiser Perth, to patrol the area between Kingston, Jamaica, and Halifax. Effingham was only able to participate in the patrols on 3–6 December before more engine problems evidenced themselves. The ship put into HM Dockyard, Bermuda for repairs, but the replacement boiler tubes proved to be defective and the cruiser would need to have them replaced at home. She sailed back to Halifax to escort Convoy HX 14 across the Atlantic on 29 December.

Effingham arrived at Portsmouth for the necessary repairs on 9 January 1940. Her engines had to be stripped down and her boiler tubes replaced; her "pom-poms" and their directors were finally installed during this time, as was her catapult. The ship was not ready for action again until 12 April when she sailed to Scapa Flow. The Navy intended Effingham to participate in Plan R 4, during which British forces would occupy Narvik, Norway, and the iron mines in Kiruna and Malmberget, Sweden if the Germans invaded Norway. The British plan had been rendered obsolete when the Germans invaded on 8 April.

==== Norwegian Campaign ====
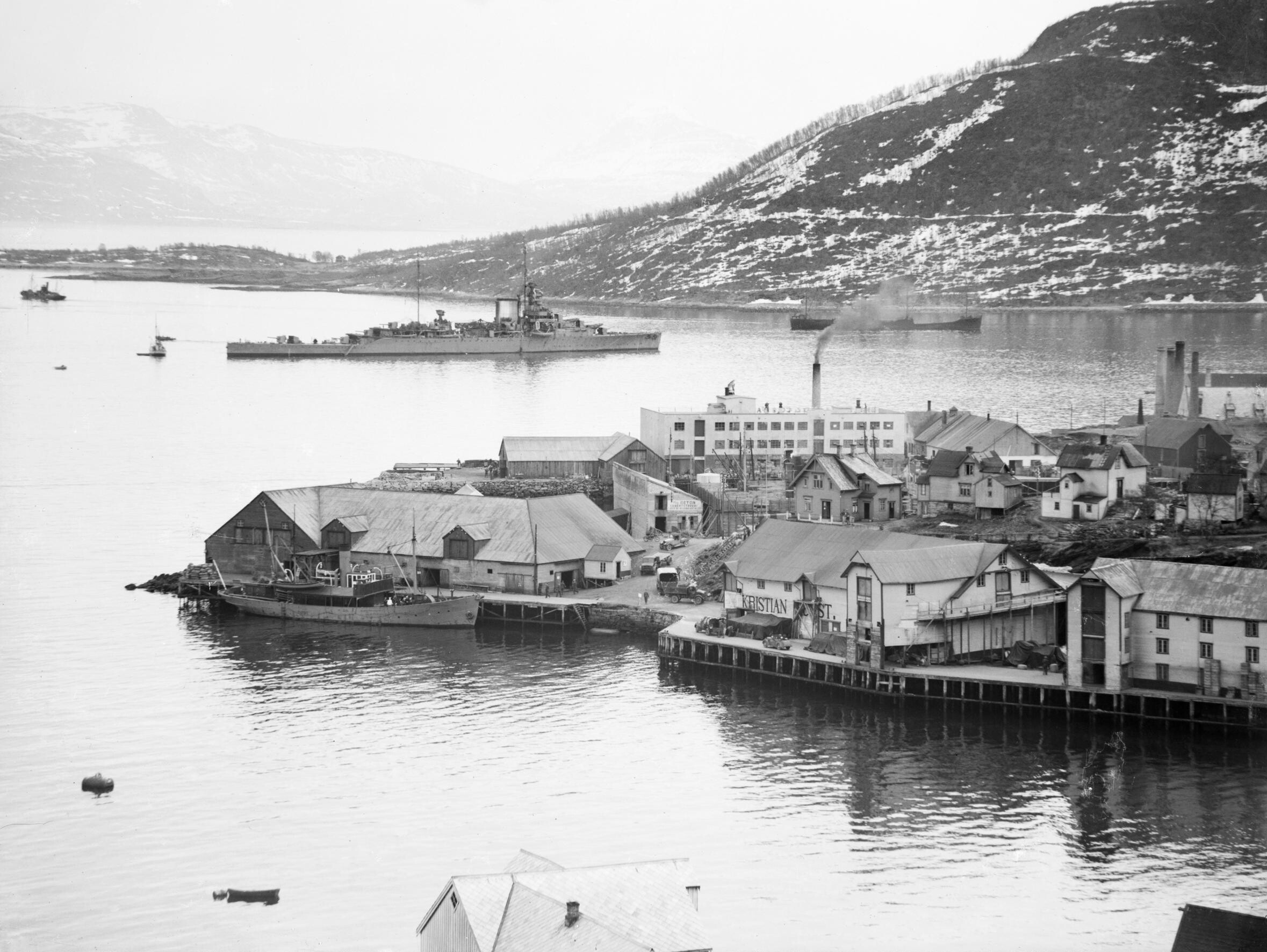
Effingham in a Norwegian fjord, April–May 1940

Together with the heavy cruiser York, the anti-aircraft cruiser Calcutta and several destroyers, Effingham was ordered on 17 April to search for a group of five German destroyers that had been spotted off Stavanger by an aircraft. The report was false, but the ships remained off the entrance to the Romsdalsfjord on 17–18 April as the British began landing troops at Molde and Åndalsnes, further inside the fjord. The German submarine U-38 made an unsuccessful attack on the cruiser during the early hours of 19 April. Effingham and her consorts arrived back at Scapa Flow later that day. On the 20th, Admiral of the Fleet Lord Cork, the newly appointed supreme commander of Allied forces in Norway, hoisted his flag aboard the cruiser. Four days later the ship participated in an ineffective bombardment of German-held Narvik in a snowstorm on the 24th. On 1 and 3 May, she helped to bombard targets in Ankenes and Bjerkvik in preparation for a planned Allied attack on Narvik itself. Effingham was the command ship for the landings at Bjerkvik on 12–13 May, hosting Lord Cork and the French commander Brigadier General (Général de brigade) Antoine Béthouart; Lieutenant-General Claude Auchinleck was also aboard the ship, but only as an observer. Effingham also ferried about 750 men of the landing force from the 13th Demi-Brigade of the Foreign Legion (13^{e} Demi-Brigade de la Légion Etrangère) and provided naval gunfire support during the attack.

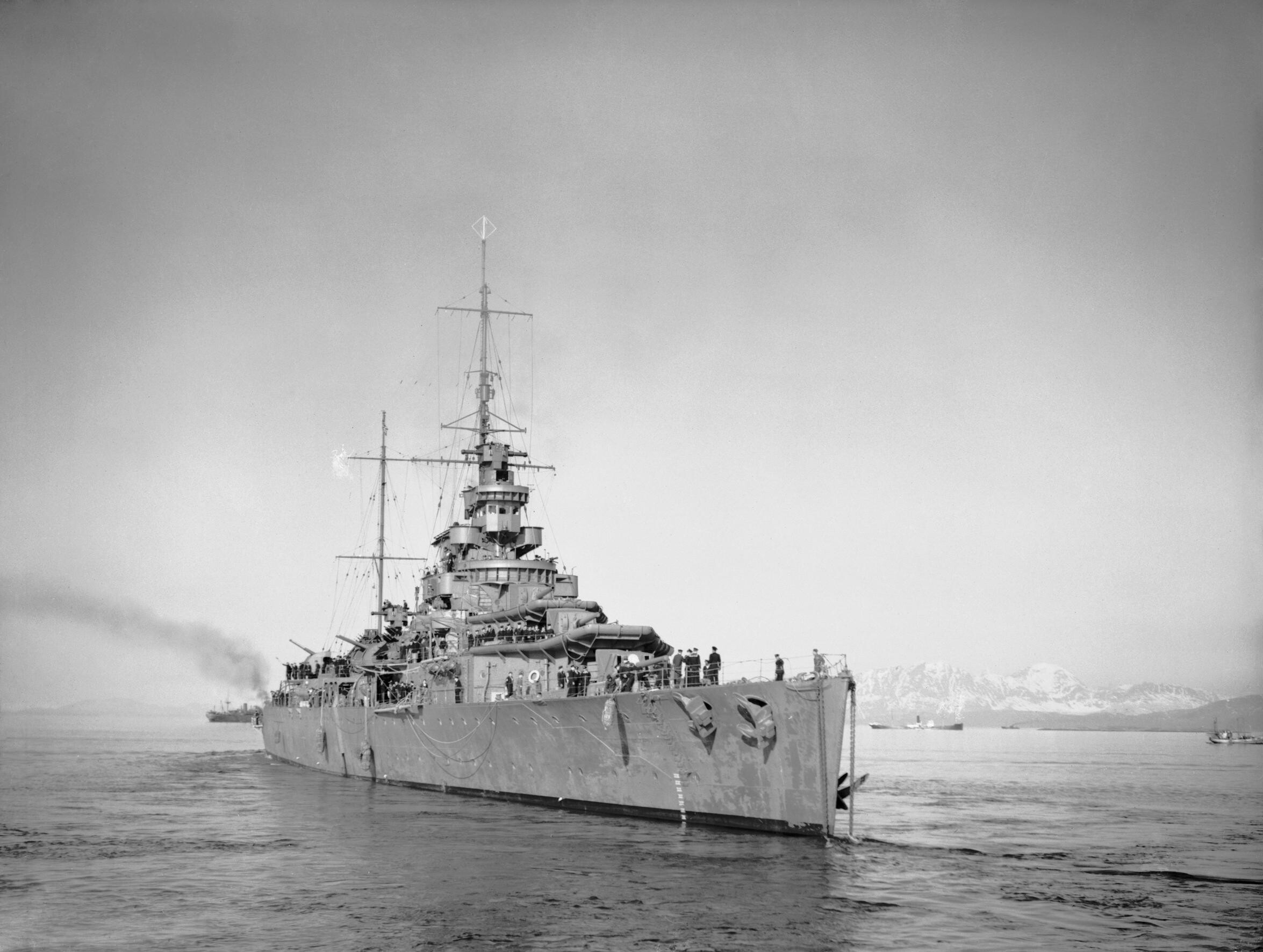
Effingham at anchor, 16 May 1940

As soon as the 2nd Battalion, the South Wales Borderers could be transferred from Ankenes to Harstad, Auchinleck decided to send them and the headquarters of the 24th Guards Brigade to reinforce the defences of Bodø. The threat of aerial attack ruled out the use of slow troopships, so the Admiralty selected Effingham to transport the troops. Howson had insisted on no more than 40 short tons (36 t) of supplies and ammunition could be accommodated aboard the cruiser in addition to the 1,020 British and French troops, but he was overruled by the Army and 130 short tons (120 t) were actually loaded in addition to ten Bren Carriers, hindering the use of some of the ship's six- and four-inch guns.

Together with the rest of the 20th Cruiser Squadron, the anti-aircraft cruisers Coventry and Cairo and escorted by the destroyers Echo and Matabele, Effingham departed Harstad at 01:00 on 17 May. To minimise the risk of air attack, the Admiralty had avoided using the much-shorter route through the Tjeldsundet Strait and the Vestfjorden, although it meant a much higher average speed en route to arrive meet the scheduled 20:00 arrival time and allow the ship to unload in the darkness, safe from attacks by the Luftwaffe. As the ships approached Bodø, Howson suggested that the threat of submarine attack was higher in the main channel and that the squadron could use a narrow strait between the island of Bliksvær and the Terra Archipelago instead. Effingham had a large-scale chart of the area and Howson believed that passage was practicable for his ship, the largest ship in the squadron. Rear-Admiral John Vivian, commander of the squadron in Coventry, lacked a copy of the chart, but concurred and ordered that Effingham should become the guide ship for the squadron with all the other ships conforming to her movements. Traveling at 23 knots (43 km/h; 26 mph), Matabele was in the lead and Echo was trailing on her starboard side, with Effingham following Matabele. As the squadron was entering the entrance to the strait around 19:47, the destroyer touched a submerged rock of the Faksen Shoal, tearing off her port propeller and its bracket, but not further damaging the ship. About a minute later Effingham struck the shoal herself, tearing large holes in her hull, and Coventry just touched her stern as she turned to starboard to avoid Effingham.

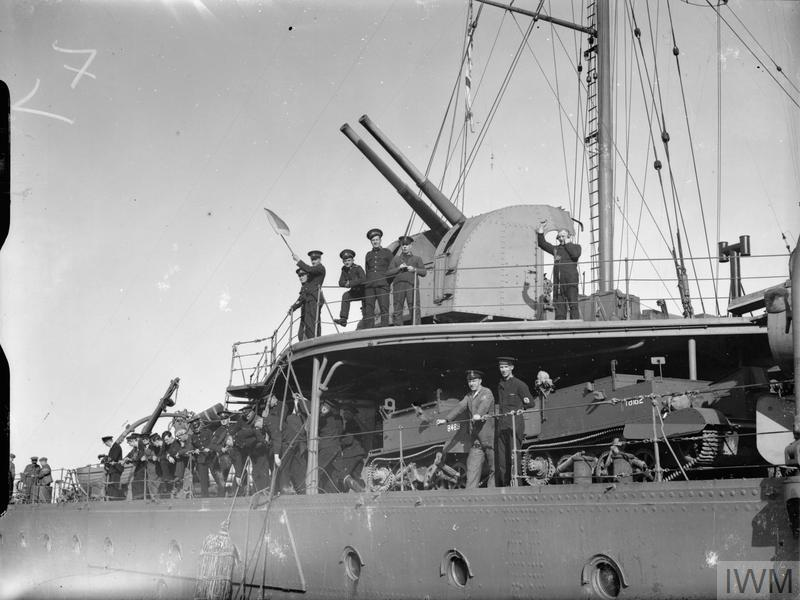
Troops and Bren carriers aboard Effingham in Harstad, 16 May 1940

The cruiser quickly lost power due to flooding after she passed over the shoal and began drifting. Although the ship was settling on an even keel, Howson was concerned that she might capsize with the loss of most of her crew and passengers and ordered Echo to tow Effingham to shallow water to allow her to be beached around 20:15. The tow was not able to progress much and Vivian ordered it to be cast off at 20:45 so the cruiser would sink in deep water where she could not be salvaged by the Germans. During this time, Echo was able to take aboard all of the passengers and over 200 of the ship's crew. By 22:10 she had transferred all of the men to Coventry and returned to Effingham to take off the remaining crewmen. In the meantime, the cruiser had grounded off Skjoldsh Island in an upright position, east of Bliksvær, in about five fathoms (9.1 m) of water. Boats from Matabele also rescued some men and they were transferred to Cairo after that ship returned from summoning ships from Bodø for assistance as there was no further room aboard Coventry. The two anti-aircraft cruisers and Matabele departed for Harstad later that night.

Echo was left behind and Howson went aboard her to supervise the attempt to salvage material by the small ships from Bodø and to ensure that Effingham was thoroughly wrecked. Although four Bren Carriers and some mortars were recovered, only a small amount of material could salvaged during the night and transported to Bodø. The detonators for the torpedo warheads and other explosives aboard the cruiser were underwater, but her guns were thoroughly sabotaged, her ready-use ammunition was thrown overboard and Echo put a pair of torpedoes into her at 08:00 which caused Effingham to capsize at coordinates 67°16.7′N 14°03.5′E. The wreck was dismantled by Høvding Skipsopphugging after the war with only a few plates and components now being left on the sea bed.
