= BL 7.5-inch Mk VI naval gun =

Ordnance BL 7.5-inch gun Mk VI
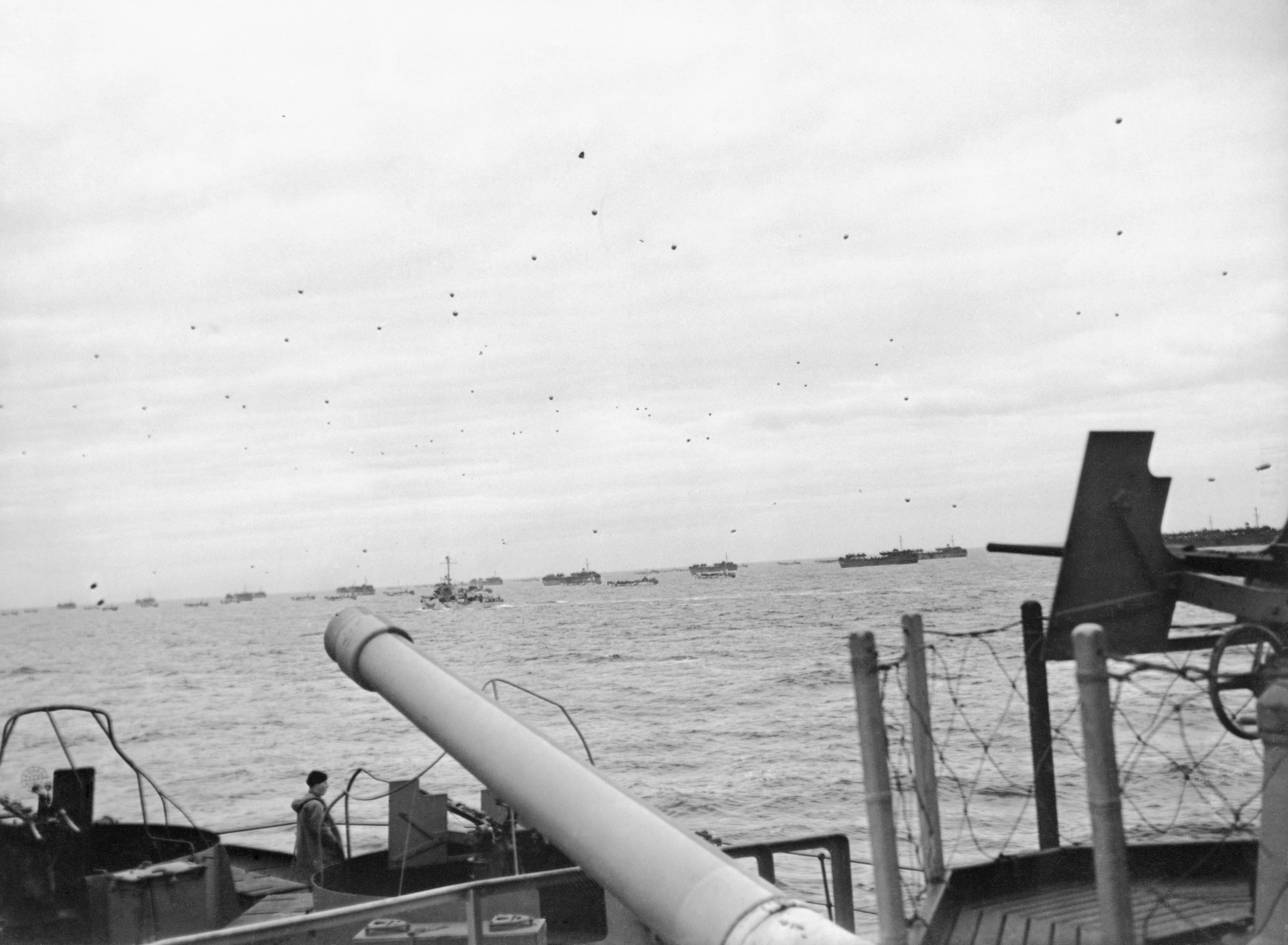
- Gun on HMS Frobisher off the south coast of England, 5 June 1944, 12 hours before D-Day
- Type: Naval gun Coast defence gun
- Place of origin: United Kingdom

Service history
- In service: 1919–1945
- Used by: Royal Navy
- Wars: World War II

Production history
- No. built: 44

Specifications
- Mass: 14 tonnes (14,000 kg)
- Barrel length: 337.5 inches (8.6 m); (45 calibres)
- Shell: 200 pounds (91 kg)
- Calibre: 7.5-inch (190 mm)
- Muzzle velocity: 2,770 feet per second (844 m/s)
- Maximum firing range: 12 miles (19 km)

The BL 7.5-inch gun Mark VI was the 45 calibre naval gun forming the main battery of Royal Navy Hawkins-class cruisers. These ships with seven single gun mounts were significant to the cruiser limitations defined by the Washington Naval Treaty.

== Description ==
These were built-up guns with two tubes, full-length wire winding, a jacket, and Welin breech block with hand-operated Asbury mechanism. The mounting was a CP Mk V a hand-operated central pivot mount with additional power training and elevation provided by a 10HP electric motor and hydraulic pump. Elevation was +30 degrees to -5 degrees and loading was possible up to +10 degrees. The total weight of the mount including its 1in open-backed shield was 45.975 tons. They used two cloth bags each containing 14 kg (31 pounds) of cordite to fire a 200-pound (91-kg) projectile up to 19 kilometres at their maximum elevation of 30 degrees. Useful life expectancy was 650 effective full charges (EFC) per barrel.

== Coast defence guns ==
Seven guns were installed as coastal artillery in the Netherlands Antilles, five in Mozambique, three in Canada, and three in a battery at South Shields during the Second World War.

== Shell trajectory ==
Range	Elevation	Time of flight	Descent	Impact velocity
5000 yd (4.6 km)	2° 30′	7 sec	3° 19′	1799 ft/s (548 m/s)
10000 yd (9.1 km)	7° 3′	17 sec	12° 32′	1218 ft/s (371 m/s)
15000 yd (14 km)	15° 21′	32 sec	27° 33′	1038 ft/s (316 m/s)
20000 yd (18 km)	27° 59′	51 sec	44° 35′	1071 ft/s (326 m/s)

== See also ==
- List of naval guns
- BL 7.5-inch Mk II – V naval gun (earlier Royal Navy guns of the same calibre)
- BL 8-inch Mk VIII naval gun (used on subsequent Royal Navy heavy cruisers)

== Bibliography ==
- Campbell, John (1985). Naval Weapons of World War Two. Naval Institute Press. ISBN 0-87021-459-4.
- Lenton, H.T. & Colledge, J.J. (1968). British and Dominion Warships of World War Two. Doubleday and Company.
- Preston, Antony (1980). Cruisers. Prentice-Hall. ISBN 0-13-194902-0.
- Whitley, M.J. (1995). Cruisers of World War Two. Brockhampton Press. ISBN 1-86019-874-0.
