= HMS Curlew (D42) =

Royal Navy C-class light cruiser

Coordinates: 68.559°N 16.558°E

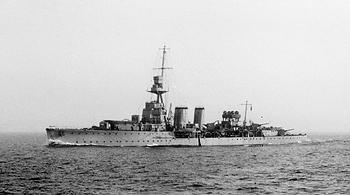

History

United Kingdom
- Name: HMS Curlew
- Builder: Vickers Limited, Barrow in Furness
- Laid down: 21 August 1916
- Launched: 5 July 1917
- Commissioned: 14 December 1917
- Identification: Pennant number: 80 (Aug 17); 3C (Jan 18); 48 (Apr 18); 42 (Nov 19); I.42 (1936); D.42 (1940)
- Fate: Sunk by air attack, 26 May 1940

General characteristics (as built)
- Class & type: C-class light cruiser
- Displacement: 4,190 long tons (4,257 t)
- Length: 425 ft (129.5 m) p/p; 450 ft (137.2 m) o/a
- Beam: 43 ft (13.1 m)
- Draught: 14 ft 8 in (4.47 m)
- Installed power: 40,000 shp (30,000 kW); 6 × Yarrow boilers
- Propulsion: 2 × shafts; 2 × geared steam turbines
- Speed: 29 kn (54 km/h; 33 mph)
- Complement: 460
- Armament: 5 × single BL 6 in (152 mm) Mk XII guns; 2 × single QF 3 in (76 mm) 20-cwt (Note: "Cwt" is the abbreviation for hundredweight, 20 cwt referring to the weight of the gun.) anti-aircraft guns; 4 × twin 21 in (533 mm) torpedo tubes
- Armour: Waterline belt: 1.25–3 in (32–76 mm); Deck: 1 in (25 mm); Conning tower: 3 in

HMS Curlew was a C-class light cruiser built for the Royal Navy during World War I. She was part of the Ceres sub-class of the C class. The ship survived World War I to be sunk by German aircraft during the Norwegian Campaign in 1940.

== Design and description ==
The Ceres sub-class was redesigned to move one of the amidships guns to a superfiring position in front of the bridge to improve its arcs of fire. This required moving the bridge and tripod mast further aft and rearranging the compartments forward of the aft boiler room. The ships were 450 feet 6 inches (137.3 m) long overall, with a beam of 43 feet (13.1 m) and a mean draught of 14 feet 8 inches (4.5 m). Displacement was 4,190 long tons (4,260 t) at normal and 5,020 long tons (5,100 t) at deep load. Curlew was powered by two Parsons steam turbines, each driving one propeller shaft, which produced a total of 40,000 indicated horsepower (30,000 kW). The turbines used steam generated by six Yarrow boilers which gave her a speed of about 29 knots (54 km/h; 33 mph). She carried 935 long tons (950 t) tons of fuel oil. The ship had a crew of about 460 officers and ratings.

The armament of the Ceres sub-class was identical to that of the preceding Caledon sub-class and consisted of five BL 6-inch (152 mm) Mk XII guns that were mounted on the centreline. One superfiring pair of guns was forward of the bridge, one was aft of the two funnels and the last two were in the stern, with one gun superfiring over the rearmost gun. The two QF 3-inch (76 mm) 20-cwt anti-aircraft guns were positioned abreast of the fore funnel. The Ceress were equipped with eight 21 in (533 mm) torpedo tubes in four twin mounts, two on each broadside.

== Construction and career ==
She was laid down by Vickers Limited on 21 August 1916, and launched on 5 July 1917, being commissioned into the navy on 14 December 1917.

Curlew left Devonport, under command of Captain Holbrook, on the 9 December, 1922, for the Imperial fortress colony of Bermuda to replace HMS Constance in the 8th Light Cruiser Squadron on the America and West Indies Station, based at the Royal Naval Dockyard, Bermuda, on Ireland Island. Expected to arrive there on the 17th of December, foul weather delayed her arrival 'til the 19th.

She was hove to offshore, outside Bermuda's encircling reefline, when the 1926 Havana–Bermuda hurricane reached Bermuda on 22 October 1922. Vessels in the Bermudian dockyard at the time included Admiralty Floating Dock No. 1 (AFD1), the cruisers HMS Calcutta, flagship of the America and West Indies Station, and HMS Capetown, the sloop HMS Wistaria (which was in the submerged AFD1 in the South Yard), RFA Serbol, the tugboats St. Abbs, St. Blazey, and Creole, and No. 5 Battle Practice Target. The dockface (or 'the wall') in the South Yard and old North Yard of the dockyard are on the eastern (Great Sound) shore of the island of Ireland (with the western shore on the open North Atlantic). Calcutta was torn free of the wharf, with all forty hawsers that had tethered her snapping, when the windspeed reached 138 mph (the highest speed recorded before the storm destroyed the dockyard's anemometer) and was saved only by the most desperate actions of her crew and other personnel, including Sub-Lieutenants Stephen Roskill of Wistaria and Conrad Byron Alers-Hankey of Capetown, who swam to attach new lines to the oil wharf.

Meanwhile, Curlew, which had sustained damage to her upper deck ("No. 1 gun, bent shield and stay Forecastle Deck torn and supporting stanchions bent. Other slight damage to material, fittings etc. Motor Boat badly damaged. Both whalers and 3 Carley Floats lost") while she rode out the storm offshore, was instructed at 16:10 on the 22nd to attempt to make contact with HMS Valerian, which had signalled "Am hove-to 5 miles south of Gibb's Hill" at 08:30 (and which had already gone down at 13:00). The dockyard received wireless SOS transmission from Eastway at 17:52. SS Luciline and SS Fort George made way to the position of Eastway. Although a wireless signal was sent to Curlew at 18:40 by the Commander-in-Chief, America and West Indies, to continue searching for Valerian as the two merchant ships were going to aid Eastway, Curlew signalled the Commander-in-Chief a minute later that she was heading towards Eastway. Eastway signalled at 18:45, "W/T signals are weak. Am shorting with water here. Cannot last long old man. Am listing more every few minutes. Port lifeboats gone. Urgent assistance required. Radio giving out and stokehold flooding". The Commander-in-Chief signalled Curlew at 18:54 to cancel the previous instruction and go to the aid of Eastway. At 19:00, this message was cancelled and Curlew ordered to resume the search for Valerian. Capetown was ordered to put to sea to join the search for Valerian at 20:03. The following day, 23 October, Capetown signalled that two men had been sighted on a raft at 31.59 North, 64.45 West. These were the first survivors from Valerian to be rescued. Two officers and seventeen men would be plucked from the ocean by 11:33. Luciline rescued twelve survivors from the crew of the Eastway by 12:34 and took them to Bermuda.

In common with most of her sisters Curlew was rearmed to become an anti-aircraft cruiser in 1935–36.

On the outbreak of war, she served with the Home Fleet. She participated in the Norwegian Campaign, and whilst operating off the Norwegian coast on 26 May 1940, she came under attack from German Junkers Ju 88 bombers of Kampfgeschwader 30 and was sunk in Lavangsfjord, Ofotfjord near Narvik. Nine sailors were lost with the ship.

== Bibliography ==
- Campbell, N.J.M. (1980). "Great Britain". In Chesneau, Roger (ed.). Conway's All the World's Fighting Ships 1922–1946. Mayflower Books. pp. 2–85. ISBN 0-8317-0303-2.
- Colledge, J. J.; Warlow, Ben & Bush, Steve (2020). Ships of the Royal Navy: The Complete Record of all Fighting Ships of the Royal Navy from the 15th Century to the Present (5th revised and updated ed.). Seaforth Publishing. ISBN 978-1-5267-9327-0.
- Dunn, Steve R. (2022). The Harwich Striking Force: The Royal Navy's Front Line in the North Sea, 1914-1918. Seaforth Publishing. ISBN 978-1-3990-1596-7.
- Friedman, Norman (2010). British Cruisers: Two World Wars and After. Seaforth Publishing. ISBN 978-1-59114-078-8.
- Lenton, H. T. (1998). British & Empire Warships of the Second World War. Naval Institute Press. ISBN 1-55750-048-7.
- Newbolt, Henry (1996) [1931]. Naval Operations. History of the Great War Based on Official Documents. Vol. V. Battery Press. ISBN 0-89839-255-1.
- Preston, Antony (1985). "Great Britain and Empire Forces". In Gray, Randal (ed.). Conway's All the World's Fighting Ships 1906–1921. Naval Institute Press. pp. 1–104. ISBN 0-85177-245-5.
- Raven, Alan & Roberts, John (1980). British Cruisers of World War Two. Naval Institute Press. ISBN 0-87021-922-7.
- Rohwer, Jürgen (2005). Chronology of the War at Sea 1939–1945: The Naval History of World War Two (Third Revised ed.). Annapolis, Maryland: Naval Institute Press. ISBN 1-59114-119-2.
- Stranack, Lieutenant-Commander B. Ian D (1990) [1977]. Written at HM Naval Base Bermuda (HMS Malabar), old Royal Naval Dockyard, Ireland Island, Bermuda. The Andrew and The Onions: The Story of The Royal Navy in Bermuda, 1795–1975 (2nd ed.). Royal Naval Dockyard, Ireland Island, Sandys Parish, Bermuda: Bermuda Maritime Museum Press. ISBN 9780921560036.
- Whitley, M. J. (1995). Cruisers of World War Two: An International Encyclopedia. Cassell. ISBN 1-86019-874-0.
