= 1926 Havana–Bermuda hurricane =

Category 4 Atlantic hurricane in 1926

1926 Havana hurricane
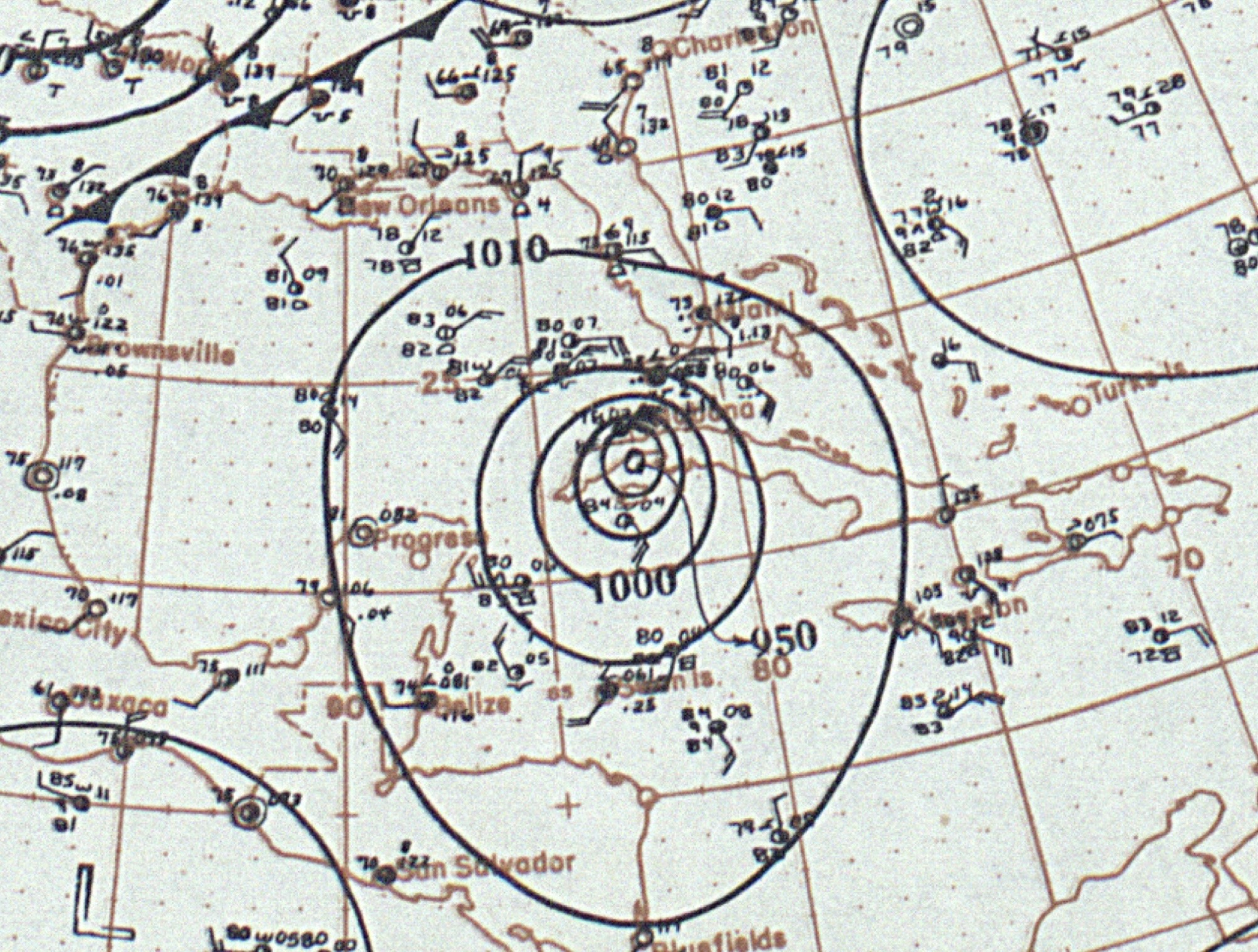
- Surface weather analysis of the hurricane nearing landfall in Cuba at peak intensity on October 20

Meteorological history
- Formed: October 14, 1926
- Dissipated: October 28, 1926

Category 4 major hurricane
- 1-minute sustained (SSHWS/NWS)
- Highest winds: 150 mph (240 km/h)
- Lowest pressure: 934 mbar (hPa); 27.58 inHg

Overall effects
- Fatalities: 709
- Areas affected: Cuba, Florida, The Bahamas, Bermuda
- IBTrACS
- Part of the 1926 Atlantic hurricane season

The 1926 Havana hurricane devastated large areas of Cuba and Bermuda in October 1926. The tenth tropical cyclone, eighth hurricane, and sixth major hurricane of the annual hurricane season, (Note: A major hurricane is a storm that ranks as Category 3 or higher on the Saffir–Simpson hurricane scale.) the storm formed from a low-pressure area in the southern Caribbean Sea on October 14. Moving slowly to the north, it steadily intensified, attaining hurricane intensity on October 18 near the Swan Islands. After passing the islands, the hurricane began to rapidly intensify as it accelerated to the north, attaining major hurricane intensity the following day. The storm later made two landfalls on Cuba as it reached peak intensity with winds of 150 mph (240 km/h) and a minimum central pressure of 934 mbar (hPa; 27.58 inHg). The hurricane slightly weakened as it passed over the island, and after entering the Straits of Florida, made a close pass of southern Florida and The Bahamas and moved out over the North Atlantic Ocean. Afterwards, the storm gradually weakened, passing over Bermuda on October 22, before executing a clockwise loop and dissipating on October 28, after becoming absorbed by an extratropical cyclone.

== Meteorological history ==
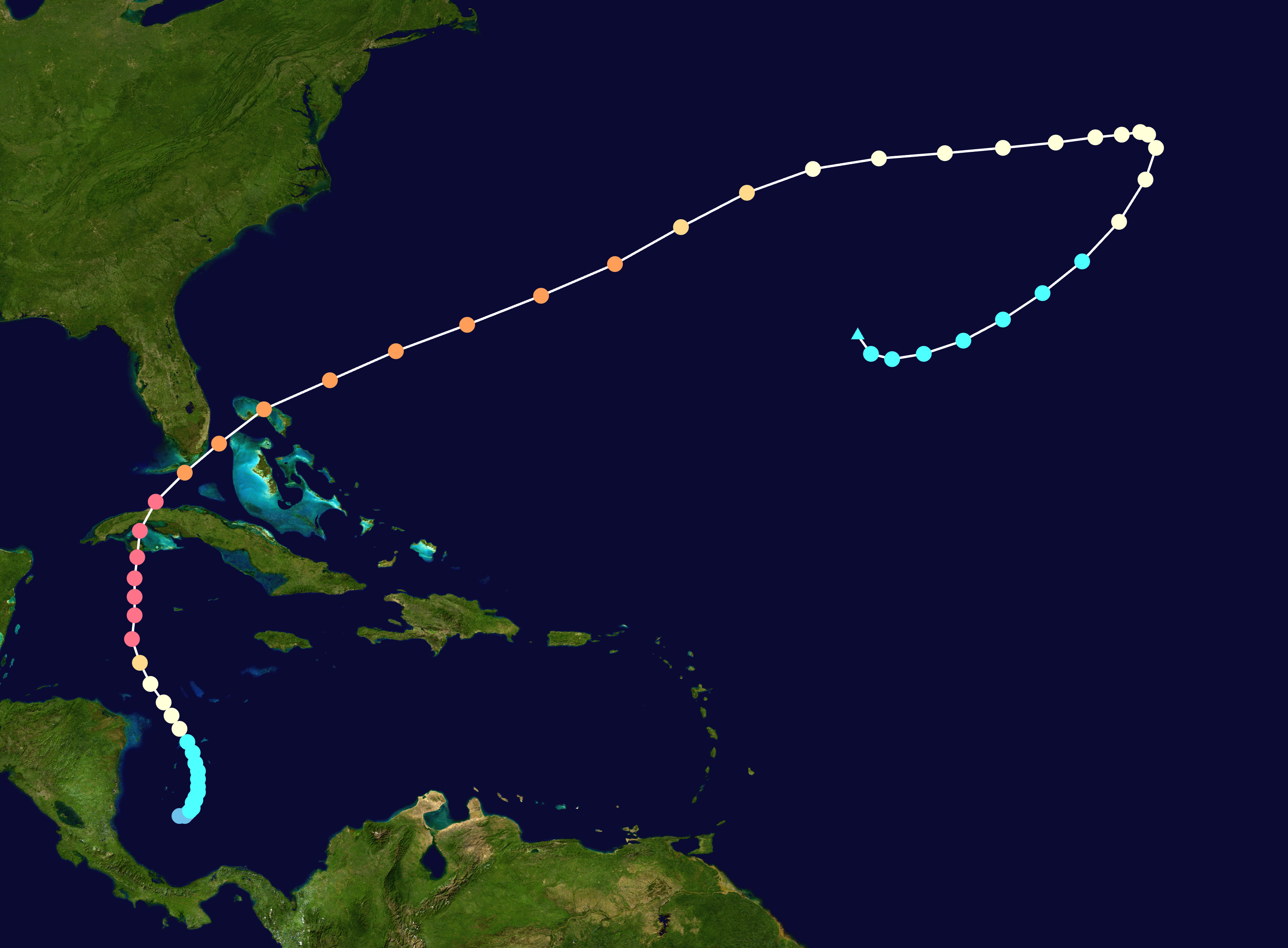
Map plotting the storm's track and intensity, according to the Saffir–Simpson scale Map key Saffir–Simpson scale Tropical depression (≤38 mph, ≤62 km/h) Tropical storm (39–73 mph, 63–118 km/h) Category 1 (74–95 mph, 119–153 km/h) Category 2 (96–110 mph, 154–177 km/h) Category 3 (111–129 mph, 178–208 km/h) Category 4 (130–156 mph, 209–251 km/h) Category 5 (≥157 mph, ≥252 km/h) Unknown Storm type Tropical cyclone Subtropical cyclone Extratropical cyclone, remnant low, tropical disturbance, or monsoon depression

An open trough of low pressure was first observed off the eastern coast of Costa Rica in the southern Caribbean Sea on October 14. In HURDAT—the database listing all tropical cyclones in the Atlantic basin since 1851—the disturbance was listed to have attained tropical depression strength by 0600 UTC later that day. Ships in the vicinity of the storm reported low barometric pressures. Moving slowly towards the north, the depression slowly intensified, and was estimated to have reached tropical storm early the following day, based on a drop in pressures in the region. The tropical storm continued to steadily intensify, with more ship reports indicating a cyclonic circulation in the area. By 2000 UTC on October 17, the disturbance attained a minimum central pressure of 993 mbar (hPa; 29.33 inHg), with maximum sustained winds of 70 mph (110 km/h).

At 0000 UTC on October 18, the tropical storm was analyzed to have attained hurricane strength in the vicinity of the Swan Islands as it began to move towards the north-northwest. The ship S.S. Atenas observed the hurricane at 1700 UTC later that day, reporting an eye associated with the storm and a minimum pressure of 974 mbar (hPa; 28.77 inHg). After passing the Swan Islands, the system began to rapidly intensify as it accelerated towards the north. At the time, the storm was located in a region of relatively low barometric pressures, with an outermost closed isobar of 1009 mbar (hPa; 29.80 inHg). By 0600 UTC on October 19, the hurricane had already intensified to an equivalent of a Category 4 hurricane on the Saffir–Simpson hurricane scale with winds of 135 mph (215 km/h). The S.S. Mojave reported a barometric pressure of 950 mbar (hPa; 28.06 inHg) associated with hurricane force winds. The major hurricane later made landfall on the Isla de la Juventud at 0800 UTC on October 20, with a minimum pressure of 939 mbar (hPa; 27.73 inHg) based on a report from Nueva Gerona. The hurricane continued to intensify after crossing the island, reaching peak intensity at 1200 UTC later that day with maximum sustained wind speeds of 150 mph (240 km/h) and a minimum central pressure of 934 mbar (hPa; 27.58 inHg) prior to making landfall in western Cuba.

Over Cuba, the storm slightly weakened prior to entering the Straits of Florida by October 21 with winds equivalent to a Category 3 hurricane. A ship offshore the northern Cuban coast reported a minimum barometric pressure of 949 mbar (hPa; 28.03 inHg). While in the straits, the hurricane began to accelerate to the northeast, passing 20–30 mi (30–50 km) in the vicinity of the Florida Keys and Biscayne Bay. The storm later passed through The Bahamas before entering the open Atlantic Ocean while maintaining Category 3 hurricane intensity, prior to passing directly over Bermuda on October 22 with an estimated minimum pressure of 962 mbar (hPa; 28.41 inHg) based on a report from Hamilton. After passing Bermuda, the storm gradually weakened, and had degenerated to a Category 1 hurricane by 1200 UTC on October 23. The hurricane later weakened further to tropical storm strength as it recurved to the southwest. The original HURDAT listed the storm as having undergone extratropical transition late on October 23, but the Atlantic hurricane reanalysis project analyzed the storm to have lasted until October 28, prior to being absorbed by a larger extratropical cyclone.

== Preparations, impact, and aftermath ==
=== Cuba ===
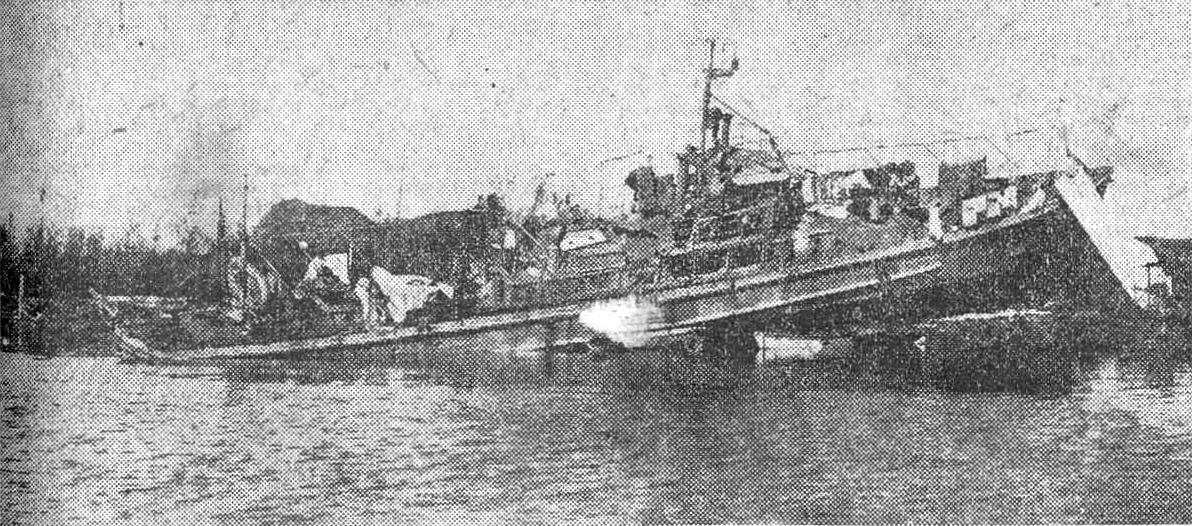
C-1 submarine chaser of the Cuban Navy

The hurricane made two separate landfalls on Cuba as a Category 4 hurricane on October 20. As it made landfall, numerous weather stations reported low barometric pressures. Barometers in Güira de Melena and Cojímar both recorded a barometric pressure of 939 mbar (hPa; 27.73 inHg) while located in the hurricane's eyewall. In Havana, a barometer registered a pressure of 951 mbar (hPa; 28.09 inHg) after recording a 34 mbar (hPa; 1.00 inHg) drop in pressure in 30 minutes. Offshore, strong waves damaged or sunk a large number of ships, including 40 fishing vessels. Small craft in harbors were also swept out to sea. Some ships part of the Cuban Navy were damaged, including the light cruiser Patria. The steamer Maximo Gomez broke from its harbor mooringss, causing it to collide and damage other ships before it was beached. Other foreign vessels, including one from the French West India Company were sunk.

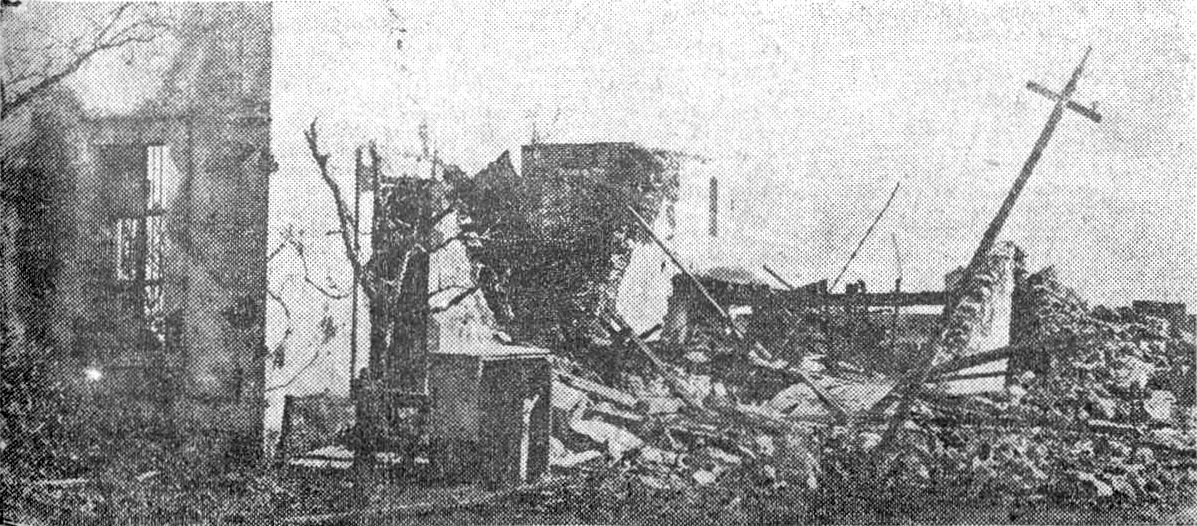
The church ruins in Nueva Gerona

On Isla de la Juventud, a majority of homes and buildings were damaged or destroyed, including an 80-year-old church that withstood many hurricanes. In Nueva Gerona, many buildings were destroyed. Only two dwellings remained standing in Santa Fe. Throughout the island, at least 38 deaths occurred and more than 200 other people were injured.

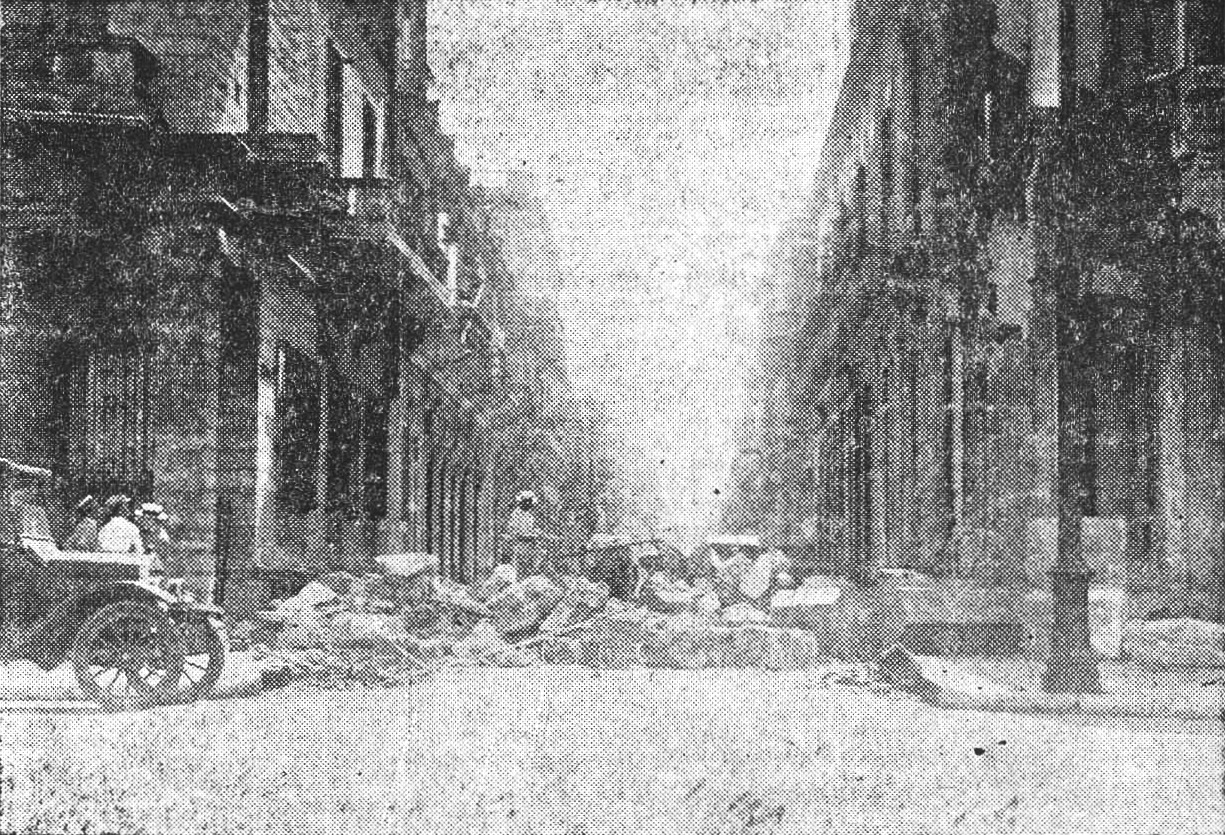
Debris near Malecón

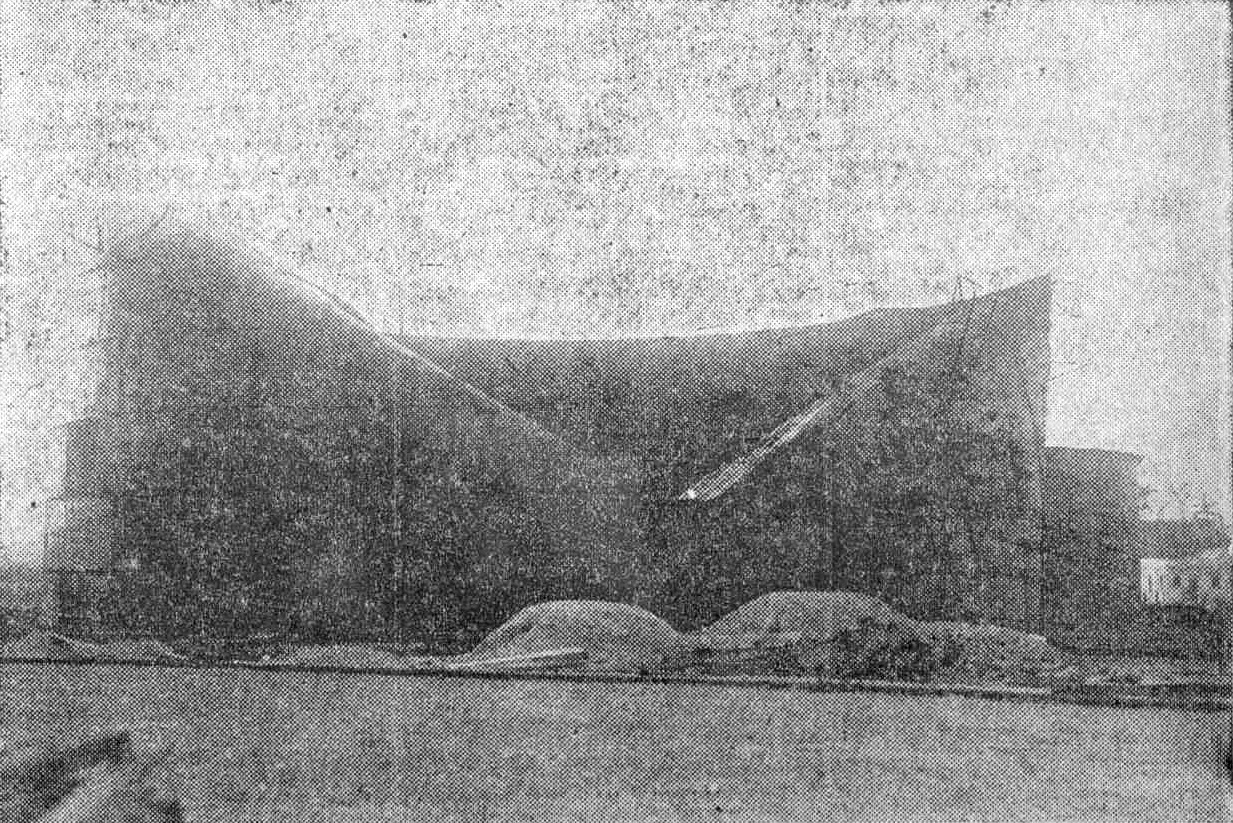
Belot oil tank destroyed by fire

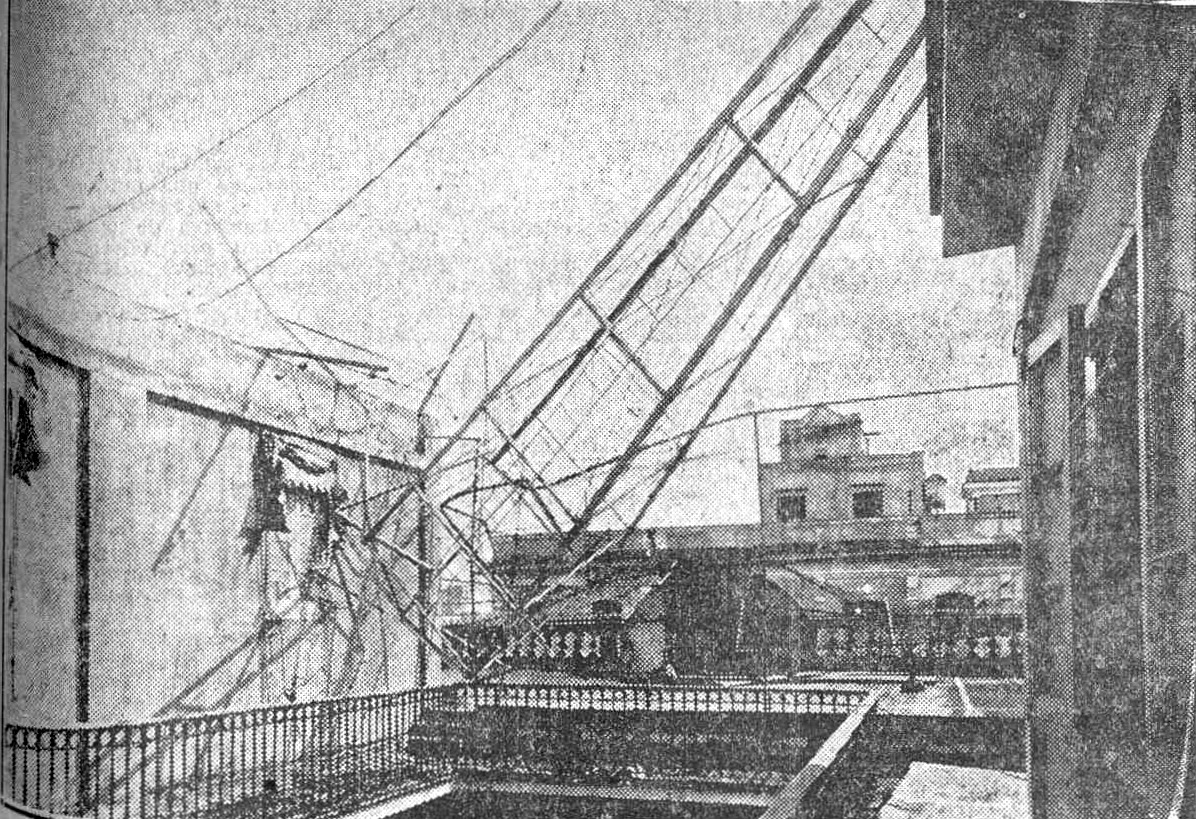
Fallen antenna tower

In Havana, 20.08 in (510 mm) of rain fell on October 20. A tidal wave overtopped the Malecón—a seawall built in 1900 by Leonard Wood to protect the city – causing much of the damage. The seawall instead prevented water from flowing back into the Straits of Florida. Densely-population low-lying sections of the city were inundated, with water reaching several meters high up to three to four streets inland. People in inundated areas were forced to evacuate to emergency shelters. The hurricane's effects destroyed at least 325 buildings and homes in the city. Some gas and oil tanks were destroyed, while the Havana Oil Company elevator was reduced to a mass of twisted steel. The Havana Automobile Company's headquarters suffered severe window damage due to the strong winds. An antenna tower was also blown down by strong winds. Power outages were widespread across other affected regions. At least 58 fatalities occurred in Havana, many of which were caused by people being struck by collapsing walls or flying debris.

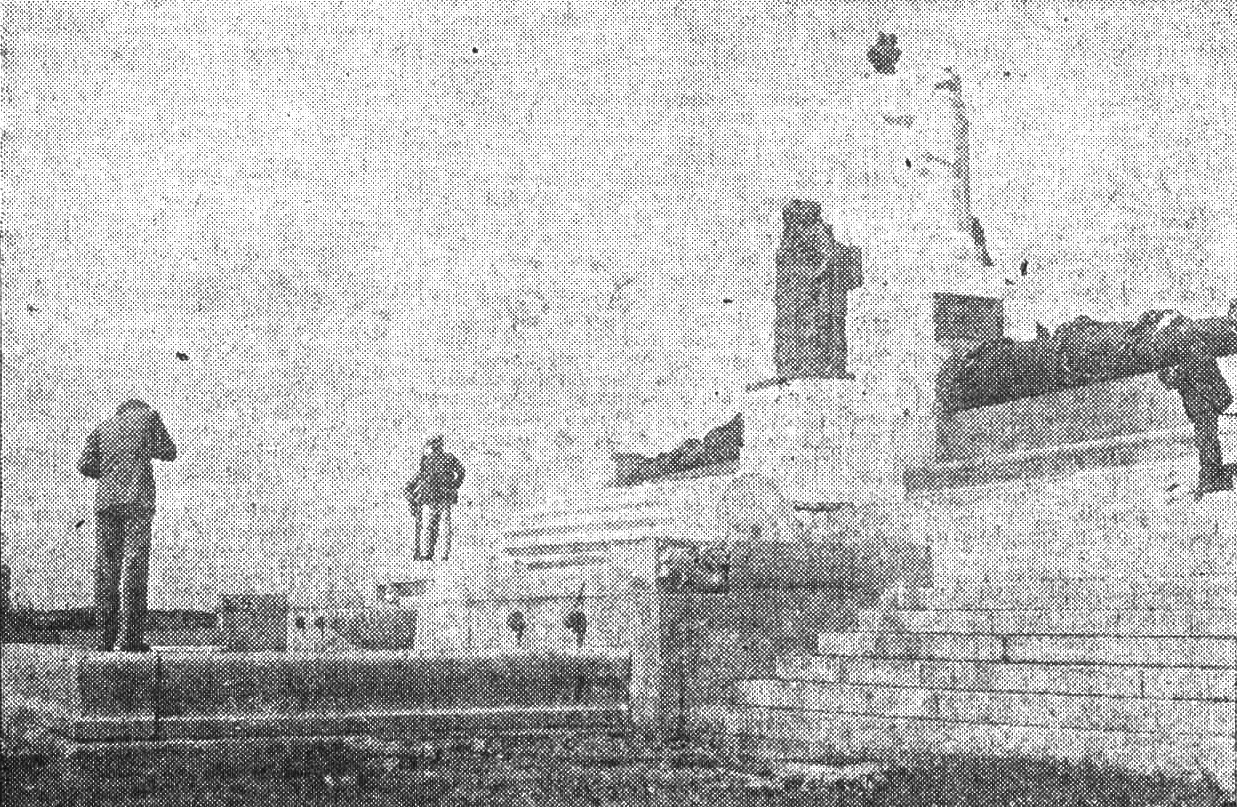
Damaged Monument to the Victims of the USS Maine

Water and electric supply to the suburb of Marianao was cut off by the hurricane. Trees along a road from Marianao to Havana were uprooted. In the tourist section, the casino, jai alai buildings, and race track suffered only minor damage, though the bathing pavilion was demolished. At the Oriental Park Racetrack, numerous homes were destroyed. Thirteen people died in Marianao, with five by drowning after local rivers rose and eight from collapsing buildings. About 25 percent of barracks in Camp Columbia were damaged. A monument in the suburbs of Havana dedicated to victims of an explosion on USS Maine was destroyed by high floodwaters. Hundreds of dwellings were destroyed in several other suburbs of Havana, including 175 homes in Bauta and 148 homes in Cojímar, while only seven homes remained standing in Bainoa. A total of 207 homes were also flattened in San José de las Lajas, where 13 fatalities were reported. Extensive damage to waterfront properties occurred in Matanzas. Five people were killed and 154 others were injured in the city. In Quinta de Los Molinos, the National Horticultural Garden, which was said to have the largest variety of tropical plants in the world—was completely destroyed.

Police were later ordered by President of Cuba Gerardo Machado to shoot people attempting to loot without warning. Two relief committees were formed, quickly collecting nearly $100 million. Private and government trucks were used to reach isolated, inland communities. The people in Havana rendered homeless by the hurricane were provided with food and water.

=== Florida and The Bahamas ===
While the storm was just offshore Cuba on early October 20, the Weather Bureau issued warnings in Florida for the approaching system. A hurricane warning was hoisted from Punta Gorda to West Palm Beach. Additionally, northeast storm warnings were issued north of Punta Gorda to Boca Grande along the west coast and north of West Palm Beach to Titusville on the east coast. In Miami, policemen and legionnaires board up their homes and then report for duty. At the city jail, prisoners were released and were required to return on their own honor. Courthouses and schools were also closed and boarded up. A few hospitals, such as Jackson Memorial, were filled with nurses and physicians and left ambulances on standby. The Miami YMCA housed about 100 people in the gymnasium. Some people sought refuge at hotels in Coral Gables. The storm caused generally minor damage in South Florida. Strong winds were reported for four hours in Key West, with sustained winds reaching as high as 90 mph (140 km/h). However, there was little impact other than broken windows and downed street signs. In Key Largo, several dwellings were declared "total wrecks", while houses along the waterfront had several feet of standing water. The city suffered "greater than [during] the previous hurricane." Four barges were beached at Biscayne Bay. In Miami, a trolley wire and a few feeder wires fell. About 2,500 Florida Power & Light crewmen shutoff the electricity and promptly repaired the wires. Some streets in Miami Shores were covered with a small amount of debris. A canal rose 1 ft (0.30 m) in Hialeah, causing flooding on the south side.

In the Bahamas, the hurricane wrecked all seawalls and wharves on the Abaco Islands. There the storm destroyed the majority of homes and left thousands of residents homeless. While comparatively few homes were wrecked on Great Guana Cay, many more were destroyed on Green Turtle Cay; on the former the storm laid waste to the sugarcane crop and mills. At Man-O-War Cay the storm downed much of the local orange and grapefruit crop. The local settlement was reduced to "'nothing but wilderness and a swamp'". At Marsh Harbour a 20-foot-high (6.1 m) storm surge, accompanied by towering waves, carried homes up to 1 mi (1.6 km) landward. In Marsh Harbour the effects of the cyclone left only a few homes standing. At Hope Town the storm destroyed a third of the homes, damaged 60 other residences, and unroofed the lighthouse keeper's dwelling. An 8-foot-high (2.4 m) storm tide penetrated 1/4 mi (0.40 km) inland, and peak gusts were estimated as high as 150 mph (240 km/h). On Bimini the storm killed about seven people. Most of the housing that remained standing after the hurricanes of July and September was destroyed. On Eleuthera the storm annihilated seaside causeways and roads, along with most of the piers. A 1/2-mile-long (0.80 km) stretch of road was submerged under 18 ft (5.5 m) of seawater. Various settlements were inundated with up to 6 ft (1.8 m) of water. Governor's Harbour reported losses of £10,000. Homes were destroyed on Cupid's Cay and at James Cistern.

=== Bermuda ===
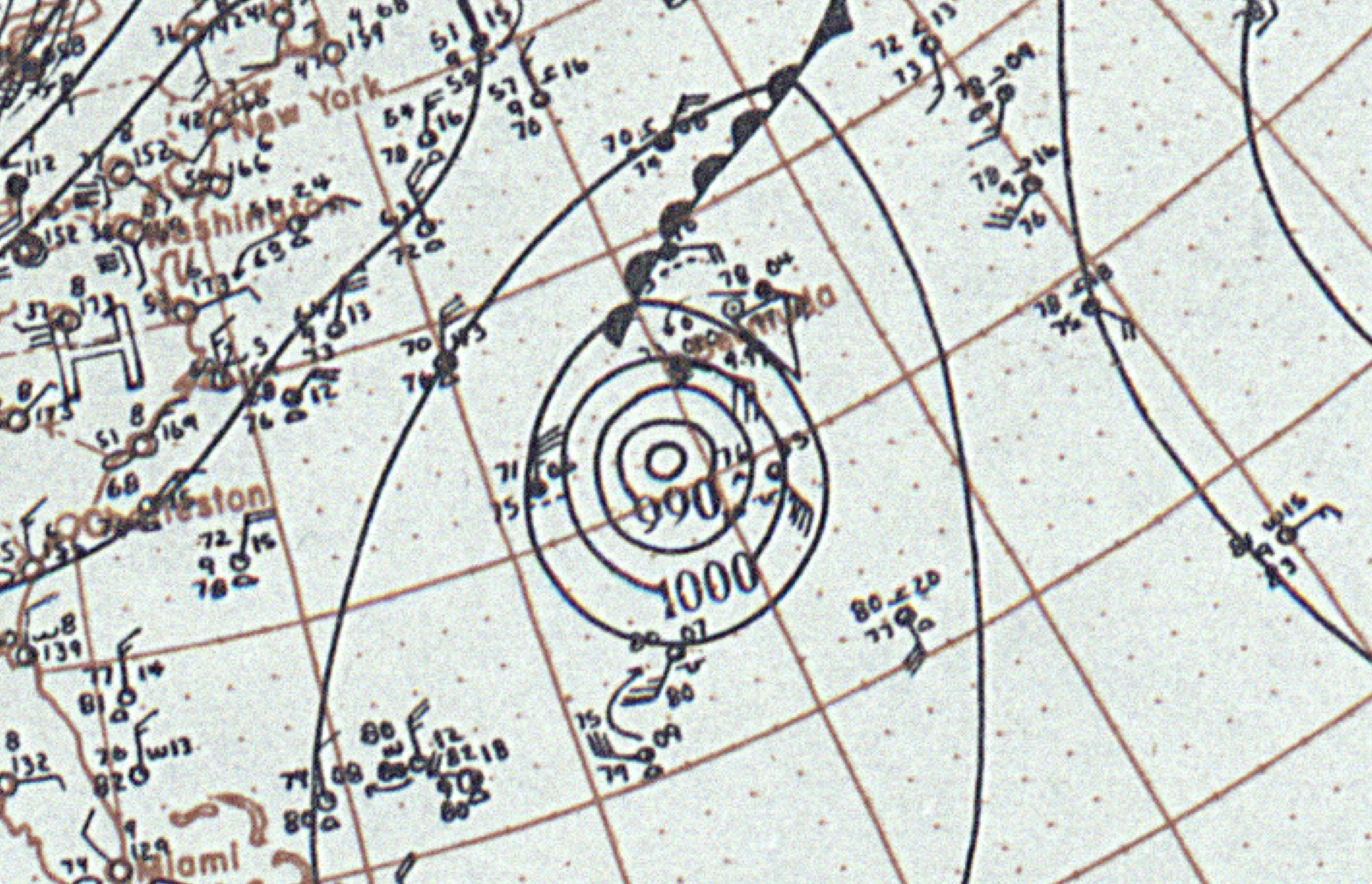
Weather map of the hurricane approaching Bermuda on October 22

In the Imperial fortress colony of Bermuda, 40% of the structures were damaged and two homes destroyed, but otherwise damage was light in St. George's Harbour and Hamilton Harbour, though naval vessels at the more exposed Royal Naval Dockyard, Bermuda (or HM Dockyard Bermuda) were placed in great peril, and the Royal Naval sloop HMS Valerian, unable to reach safety before the storm hit, foundered off the southern shore with the loss of 85 crew. While weather forecasters knew of the storm's approach on Bermuda, it covered the thousand miles from the Bahamas to Bermuda so rapidly it apparently struck with few warning signs aside from heavy swells. On October 21, with the eye of the storm still 700 mi (1,130 km) from Bermuda, weather forecasts from the United States called for the hurricane to strike the island on the following morning with gale force.

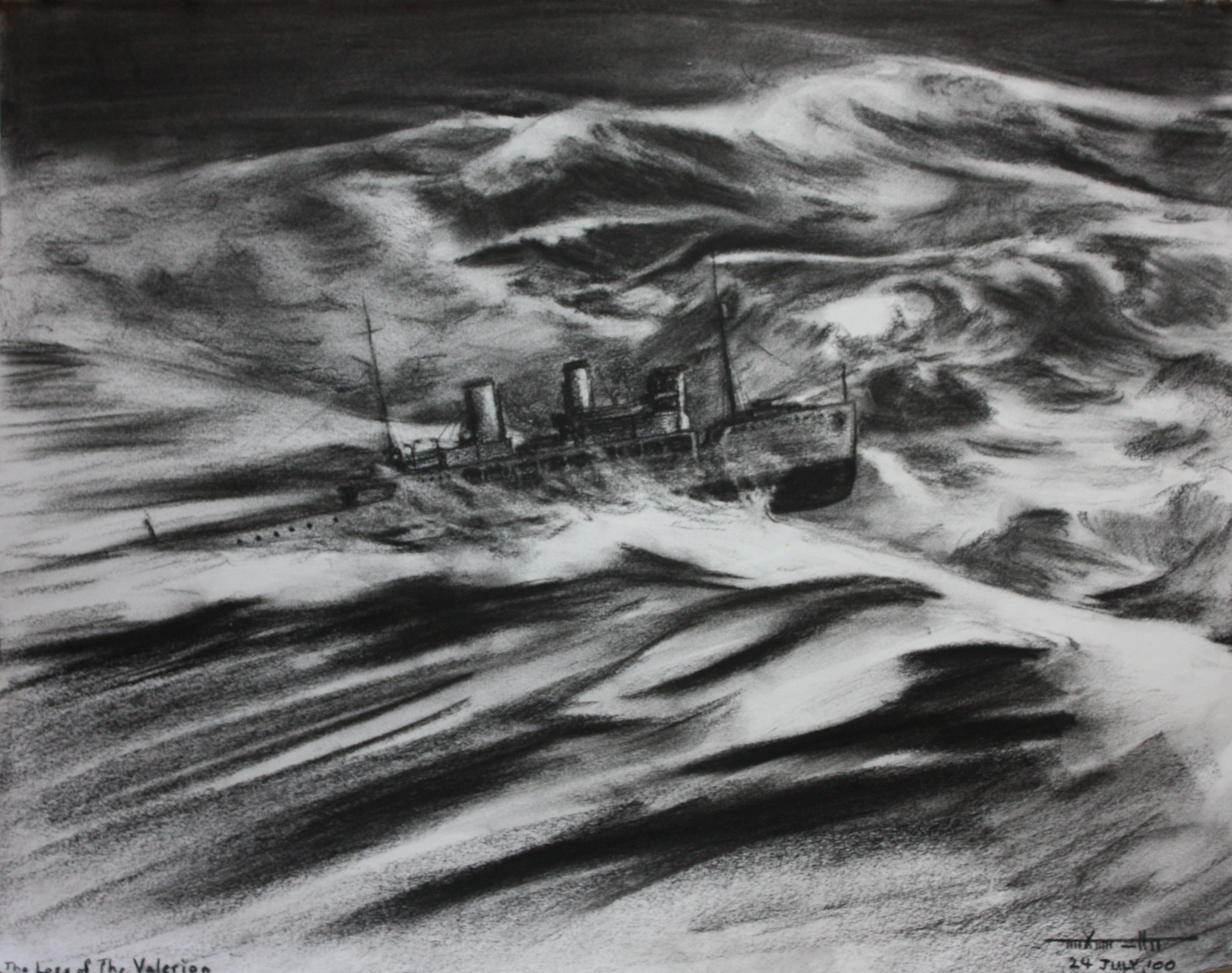
Illustration of HMS Valerian in the hurricane

HMS Valerian, based at the HMD Bermuda, was returning from providing hurricane relief in the Bahamas and was overtaken by the storm shortly before she could make harbour. She last radioed after sighting Gibb's Hill Lighthouse early in the morning, at which time the crew saw no sign of an approaching storm. By the time she reached the Five Fathom Hole, conditions were too rough to risk the channel through the reefs and the crew were forced to turn southward to obtain sea room from the reefline, and heading directly into the storm. She fought the storm for more than five hours before she was sunk with the loss of 85 men. The British merchant ship Eastway, travelling from Norfolk, Virginia, to Pernambuco, Brazil, was also sunk near Bermuda. When the centre of the storm passed over Bermuda, winds increased to 114 mph (183 km/h) at Prospect Camp, whereupon the Army took down its anemometer to protect it. The Royal Naval Dockyard was being hammered and never took its anemometer down. It measured 138 mph (222 km/h) at 13:00 UTC, before the wind destroyed it.

Vessels in the dockyard when the storm arrived included Admiralty Floating Dock No. 1 (AFD1), the cruisers HMS Calcutta, flagship of the America and West Indies Station, and HMS Capetown (another C-class cruiser, HMS Curlew, was offshore), the sloop HMS Wistaria (which was in the submerged AFD1 in the South Yard), RFA Serbol, the tugboats St. Abbs, St. Blazey, and Creole, and No. 5 Battle Practice Target. The dockface (or the wall) in the South Yard and old North Yard of the dockyard are on the eastern (Great Sound) shore of the island of Ireland (with the western shore on the open North Atlantic). Calcutta was tied (bow to the North) to the wall at the oiling wharf (at the northern end of the South Yard), where, during an unusually high tide, it was more exposed to the wind blowing eastward over the island, than it would have been in the more sheltered North Yard (where Capetown tore up two bollards but otherwise rode out the storm safely), so forty hawsers were used, but all snapped when the windspeed reached 138 mph (the highest speed recorded before the storm destroyed the dockyard's anemometer). Fortunately, the bow anchor had been dropped, and held as the stern was swung around to the westward, into the channel (the entrance to the dockyard from the Great Sound) between the two breakwaters that protected the two sections of the dockyard, and the starboard beam of the ship contacted the end of the northern breakwater. Calcutta used her propulsion system to fight the wind that would have driven her backwards into the sound, and Executive Officer Commander HM Maltby and fifty other crew members jumped onto the breakwater and lashed the ship to the end of the breakwater, while Sub-Lieutenants Stephen Roskill of Wistaria and Conrad Byron Alers-Hankey (a cousin of Alexander Maurice Alers Hankey, and brothers Maurice Pascal Alers Hankey, 1st Baron Hankey (the creator of the modern UK Cabinet Office) and Donald William Alers Hankey, and descendant of the Reverend William Alers Hankey (1771–1859), an ex-banker and the secretary of the London Missionary Society (LMS) for whom the town of Hankey, South Africa, was named) of Capetown swam to attach two more lines to the oil wharf.

Curlew, which had sustained damage to her upper deck ("No. 1 gun, bent shield and stay Forecastle Deck torn and supporting stanchions bent. Other slight damage to material, fittings etc. Motor Boat badly damaged. Both whalers and 3 Carley Floats lost") while she rode out the storm offshore, was instructed at 16:10 on the 22nd to attempt to contact Valerian, which had signalled "Am hove-to 5 miles south of Gibb's Hill" at 08:30 (and which had already gone down at 13:00). The dockyard received wireless SOS transmission from Eastway at 17:52. SS Luciline and SS Fort George made way to the position of Eastway. Although a wireless signal was sent to Curlew at 18:40 by the Commander-in-Chief, America and West Indies, to continue searching for Valerian as the two merchant ships were going to aid Eastway, Curlew signalled the Commander-in-Chief a minute later that she was heading towards Eastway. Eastway signalled at 18:45, "W/T signals are weak. Am shorting with water here. Cannot last long old man. Am listing more every few minutes. Port lifeboats gone. Urgent assistance required. Radio giving out and stokehold flooding". The Commander-in-Chief signalled Curlew at 18:54 to cancel the previous instruction and go to the aid of Eastway. At 19:00, this message was cancelled and Curlew ordered to resume the search for Valerian. Capetown was ordered to put to sea to join the search for Valerian at 20:03. The following day, 23 October, Capetown signalled that two men had been sighted on a raft at 31.59 North, 64.45 West. These were the first survivors from Valerian to be rescued. Two officers and seventeen men would be plucked from the ocean by 11:33. Luciline rescued twelve survivors from the crew of the Eastway by 12:34 and took them to Bermuda.

== See also ==
- List of Bermuda hurricanes
- List of Category 4 Atlantic hurricanes
- Hurricane Gustav
- 1910 Cuba hurricane

== Sources ==
- Neely, Wayne (2009). The Great Bahamian Hurricanes of 1926: the Story of Three of the Greatest Hurricanes to Ever Affect the Bahamas. New York City: iUniverse. ISBN 978-1-4401-5174-3 – via Google Books.
- Neely, Wayne (2019). The Greatest and Deadliest Hurricanes to Impact the Bahamas. Cheyenne, Wyoming: UrLink. ISBN 978-1-64753-121-8.
- Stranack, Lieutenant-Commander B. Ian D (1990) [1977]. Written at HM Naval Base Bermuda (HMS Malabar), old Royal Naval Dockyard, Ireland Island, Bermuda. The Andrew and The Onions: The Story of The Royal Navy in Bermuda, 1795–1975 (2nd ed.). Royal Naval Dockyard, Ireland Island, Sandys Parish, Bermuda: Bermuda Maritime Museum Press. ISBN 9780921560036.
- Tucker, Terry (1996). Beware The Hurricane: The Story of the Cyclonic Tropical Storms That Have Struck Bermuda, 1609–1995 (4th ed.). Hamilton, Bermuda: The Island Press Ltd.
