= HMS Capetown =

Royal Navy C-class light cruiser

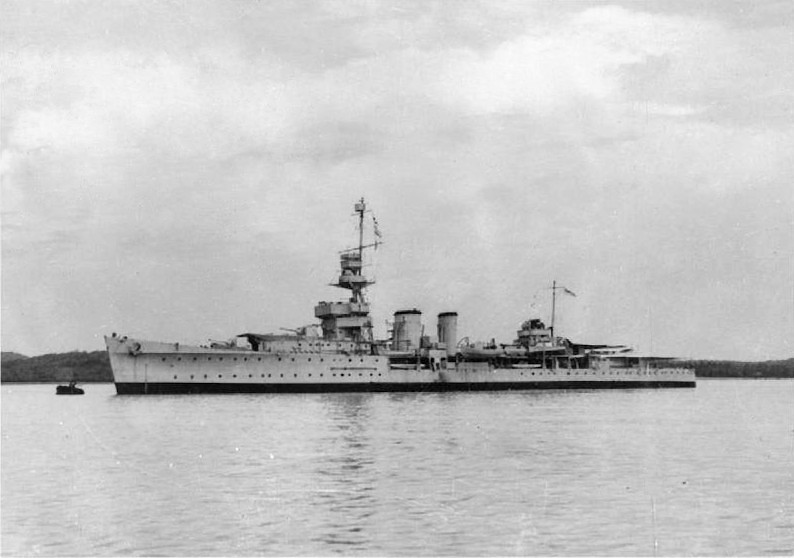

History

United Kingdom
- Name: HMS Capetown
- Builder: Cammell Laird
- Laid down: 23 February 1917
- Launched: 28 June 1918
- Commissioned: February 1922
- Out of service: Sold 5 April 1946
- Identification: Pennant number: 88 (Nov 19); I.88 (1936); D.88 (1940)
- Fate: Broken up from June 1946

General characteristics
- Class & type: C-class light cruiser
- Length: 451.4 ft (137.6 m)
- Beam: 43.9 ft (13.4 m)
- Draught: 14 ft (4.3 m)
- Propulsion: Parsons geared turbines; Yarrow boilers; 2 propellers; 40,000 shp (29,828 kW)
- Speed: 29 knots
- Range: carried 300 tons (950 tons maximum) of fuel oil
- Complement: 330-350
- Armament: 5 × 6-inch (152 mm) guns; 2 × 3-inch (76 mm) anti-aircraft guns; 4 × 3-pounder guns; 2 × 2-pounder pom-poms; 1 × machine gun; 8 × 21 in (533 mm) torpedo tubes
- Armour: 3in side (amidships); 2¼-1½in side (bows); 2in side (stern); 1in upper decks (amidships); 1in deck over rudder

HMS Capetown was a C-class light cruiser of the Royal Navy, named after the South African city of Cape Town. So far she has been the only ship of the Royal Navy to bear the name. She was part of the Carlisle group of the C-class of cruisers.

Capetown was commissioned too late to see action in the First World War, but served in the Second World War. She was laid down by Cammell Laird on 23 February 1918, and launched on 28 June 1918. She was sailed to Pembroke Dock for outfitting, a process finally completed in February 1922. Like most of her sisters, she was originally assigned to the Mediterranean and then the Red Sea, following which she was assigned to the America and West Indies Station, based at the Royal Naval Dockyard, on Ireland Island in the Imperial fortress colony of Bermuda until 1929. On 21 September 1922, Bermuda was struck with little warning by a hurricane. Capetown was in the floating drydock AFD1, which was partially submerged, protecting the cruiser from the worst of the storm. One crewman was killed, falling from the wharf and drowning. A sailor from Arabis-class sloop-of-war HMS Valerian, a cook named McKenyon, dove overboard but was unable to save him.

Capetown rescued the 20 survivors of HMS Valerian after Valerian foundered in the Atlantic Ocean 18 nautical miles (33 km) south of Bermuda on 22 October 1926 during a hurricane with the loss of most of her crew, having been unable to enter the channel through Bermuda's encircling reefline before the storm swell grew too great. When the storm struck, vessels in the dockyard included Admiralty Floating Dock No. 1 (AFD1), the cruisers HMS Calcutta, flagship of the America and West Indies Station, and Capetown (another C-class cruiser, HMS Curlew, was offshore), the sloop HMS Wistaria (which was in the submerged AFD1 in the South Yard), RFA Serbol, the tugboats St. Abbs, St. Blazey, and Creole, and No. 5 Battle Practice Target. Capetown herself was tied to the wharf in the original fortified yard of the Royal Naval Dockyard, Bermuda (which had become the North Yard at the turn-of-the-century, when the South Yard had been constructed outside of the fortifications). Capetown tore up two of the bollards to which she was secured, but otherwise rode out the storm safely, unlike her sister ship, HMS Calcutta, which had been tied to the wharf in the South Yard with forty hawsers, all of which snapped when the windspeed reached 138 mph (the highest speed recorded before the storm destroyed the dockyard's anemometer). Calcutta avoided destruction only through the resourcefulness and courage of her crew and others, including Sub-Lieutenants Stephen Roskill of HMS Wistaria and Conrad Byron Alers-Hankey (a cousin of Alexander Maurice Alers Hankey, and brothers Maurice Pascal Alers Hankey, 1st Baron Hankey (the creator of the modern UK Cabinet Office) and Donald William Alers Hankey, and descendant of the Reverend William Alers Hankey (1771–1859), an ex-banker and the secretary of the London Missionary Society (LMS) for whom the town of Hankey, South Africa was named) of Capetown, who swam across the camber to attach two lines from Calcutta to the shore.

Curlew, which had sustained damage to her upper deck ("No. 1 gun, bent shield and stay Forecastle Deck torn and supporting stanchions bent. Other slight damage to material, fittings etc. Motor Boat badly damaged. Both whalers and 3 Carley Floats lost") while she rode out the storm offshore, was instructed at 16:10 on the 22nd to attempt to contact Valerian, which had radioed "Am hove-to 5 miles south of Gibb's Hill" at 08:30 (and which had already gone down at 13:00). The dockyard received wireless SOS transmission from Eastway at 17:52. SS Luciline and SS Fort George made way to the position of Eastway. Although a wireless signal was sent to Curlew at 18:40 by the Commander-in-Chief, America and West Indies, to continue searching for Valerian as the two merchant ships were going to aid Eastway, Curlew signalled the Commander-in-Chief a minute later that she was heading towards Eastway. Eastway signalled at 18:45, "W/T signals are weak. Am shorting with water here. Cannot last long old man. Am listing more every few minutes. Port lifeboats gone. Urgent assistance required. Radio giving out and stokehold flooding". The Commander-in-Chief signalled Curlew at 18:54 to cancel the previous instruction and go to the aid of Eastway. At 19:00, this message was cancelled and Curlew ordered to resume the search for Valerian. Capetown was ordered to put to sea to join the search for Valerian at 20:03. The following day, 23 October, Capetown signalled that two men had been sighted on a raft at 31.59 North, 64.45 West. These were the first survivors from Valerian to be rescued. Two officers and seventeen men would be plucked from the ocean by 11:33. Luciline rescued twelve survivors from the crew of the Eastway by 12:34 and took them to Bermuda.

Capetown spent a large part of her career with the Eastern Fleet, including a period between the wars from July 1934 until August 1938, when she returned to the United Kingdom for a refit. She rejoined the Mediterranean Fleet in August 1940. While deployed in the Red Sea, she was torpedoed and severely damaged by the Italian motor torpedo boat MAS 213 off Massawa, on 6 April 1941. Eight members of her crew lost their lives. After a year of repairs at Bombay, she served with the Eastern Fleet until 1943. She then returned to the UK and joined the Home Fleet.

During the Normandy landings in June 1944 Capetown was deployed as a Shuttle Control/Depot ship at Mulberry A placed to seaward in order to direct incoming convoys to berths or anchorages. Ceres was anchored inshore to control returning convoys of unloaded vessels with Shuttle Control Command for both ships being embarked in Capetown. Shuttle Control Command was responsible for keeping the Army informed of expected arrivals and directing them to the proper unloading sectors.

She survived the war and was sold on 5 April 1946. She arrived at the yards of Ward of Preston for breaking up on 2 June 1946.
