= HMS Ceres (D59) =

Royal Navy C-class light cruiser

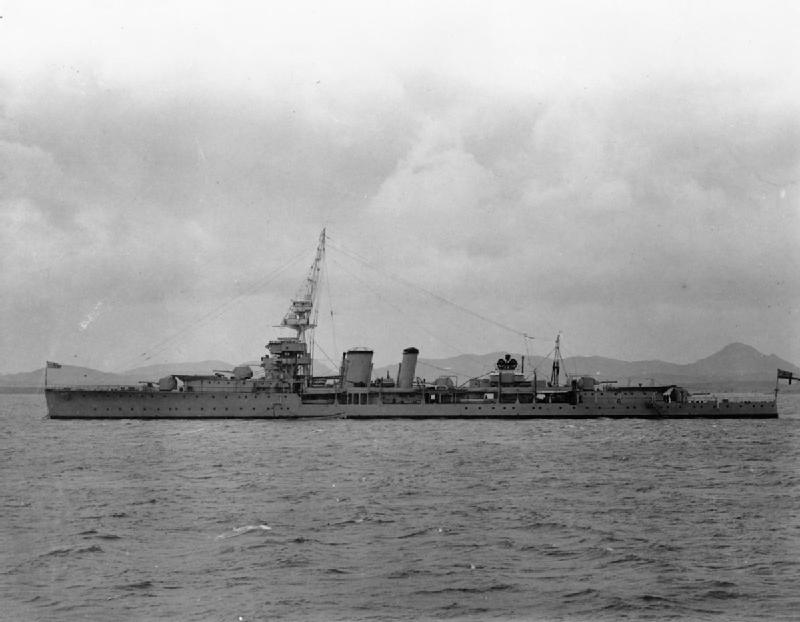
- HMS Ceres

History

United Kingdom
- Name: HMS Ceres
- Builder: John Brown & Company, Clydebank
- Laid down: 26 April 1916
- Launched: 24 March 1917
- Commissioned: 1 June 1917
- Reclassified: accommodation/base ship at Portsmouth October 1945
- Identification: Pennant number: 66 (Jun 17); 36 (Jan 18); 58 (Apr 18); 59 (Nov 19); I.59 (1936); D.59 (1940)
- Fate: Broken up July 1946

General characteristics
- Class & type: C-class light cruiser
- Displacement: 4,190 tons
- Length: 450 ft (140 m)
- Beam: 43.6 ft (13.3 m)
- Draught: 14 ft (4.3 m)
- Propulsion: Two Brown-Curtis geared turbines; Six Yarrow boilers; Two propellers; 40,000 shp
- Speed: 29 knots (54 km/h)
- Range: carried 300 tons (950 tons maximum) of fuel oil
- Complement: 327
- Armament: 5 × 6-inch (152 mm) (152 mm) guns; 2 × 3-inch (76 mm) (76 mm) guns; 2 × 2-pounder (907g) guns; 8 × 21 inch (533 mm) torpedo tubes
- Armour: 3 inch side (amidships); 2¼-1½ inch side (bows); 2 inch side (stern); 1 inch upper decks (amidships); 1 inch deck over rudder

HMS Ceres was a C-class light cruiser of the Royal Navy. She was the name ship of the Ceres group of the C-class of cruisers.

== Construction and early years ==
The Ceres was constructed at Clydebank by John Brown & Company. She was laid down on 26 April 1916, launched on 24 March 1917 by Isabel Law, daughter of the wartime Chancellor of the Exchequer Bonar Law, and commissioned into the navy on 1 June 1917.

In July 1917 Ceres joined the 6th Light Cruiser Squadron as part of the Grand Fleet. She also saw service in the British campaign in the Baltic (1918–1919) as a part of a taskforce operating against the Bolshevik Red fleet. Among her operations included providing training, supply, and bombardment support for the Estonian and Latvian provisional governments in the Baltic Wars of Independence. She was transferred to the 3rd Light Cruiser Squadron in 1919 which was assigned to operate in the Mediterranean. During 1920 was operating in the Black Sea in support of operations against Communist forces. On 30 March 1923 whilst in port at Constantinople, USS Fox collided with her stern causing damage to both ships. In 1927 Ceres returned to the UK for deployment with the Home Fleet. During 1929-1931 she was refitted and placed in reserve, but reactivated in 1932 to join the Mediterranean Fleet. In November Ceres was again reduced to the reserve.

== Wartime career ==
=== The Home and Mediterranean Fleets ===
On the outbreak of war in 1939 Ceres was recommissioned from the Reserve Fleet and placed on the Northern Patrol in the Denmark Strait between Iceland and Greenland. In January 1940, Ceres underwent a refit at the yards of Harland & Wolff in Belfast, Northern Ireland in preparation for her reassignment to the Mediterranean. On 15 February she was reassigned from HMNB Devonport to her new base at Malta, travelling via Gibraltar. During March she led contraband patrols in the Ionian Sea, and off the coast of Greece, checking ships transporting cargoes to the Axis countries, as well as escorting Allied convoys.

=== The Eastern Fleet and Indian Ocean ===
During April and May 1940, Ceres was assigned to the Eastern Fleet and based at Singapore. She was used to patrol off the Dutch East Indies coast in opposition to Japanese naval forces. In June she was assigned to operate in the Indian Ocean and based at Colombo and later Bombay, where she escorted tanker convoys from the Persian Gulf to the British colony at Aden. She then spent several months off the east coast of Africa, based at Mombassa, Kenya. Whilst on patrol off the coast of Somaliland she evacuated troops and civilians from British Somaliland to Aden, and she was later involved in convoy duties sailing around Cape Horn between Durban and Cape Town. Later that year she was sent to the Seychelles and other islands to search for German commerce raiders, who were preying on Allied shipping in the area.

From 16–19 August 1940 Ceres assisted in the evacuation of British and Allied soldiers from Berbera in British Somaliland as Italian forces moved on the capital, transporting them to the relative safety of Aden. In this capacity, Ceres bombarded the advancing Italian column on 17 August, slowing their progress and giving British troops retreating after the Battle of Tug Argan time to evacuate.

In February 1941 Ceres, in company with the cruisers HMS Hawkins and HMS Capetown and the destroyer HMS Kandahar, blockaded Kisimayu in support of the offensive against Italian Somaliland, and the eventual reconquest of British Somaliland in March that year. She also rescued merchant navy prisoners of war from Brava and transported them to Mombassa. After this Ceres again returned to Colombo for repairs.

On New Year's Day 1942, in company with the sloop HMS Bridgewater she escorted the 18 ships of Convoy WS-14 to South Africa from the U.K. with reinforcements for the Middle East. Ceres spent two months in the Persian Gulf, and then arrived at Simonstown for a three-month refit, where she was dry-docked. As with most of the ships of the 'C'-class, she was also fitted with six 20 mm single AA weapons to become an anti-aircraft cruiser. Coventry, Curacoa and Curlew had already undergone conversion before the war, but the outbreak delayed Ceres' and Cardiff's conversions. She was then based at Aden and she also participated in the fall of Djibouti to the allied forces. She spent the rest of the year escorting convoys to Durban. She finally returned to home waters and her homeport of Devonport in October 1943. By now she had steamed over 235,000 miles in her career.

=== Home waters ===
In 1943 and 1944, HMS Ceres was used by the Royal Navy as "station ship" based at the Royal Naval College in Dartmouth. In late April 1944, HMS Ceres was refitted with radar and anti-aircraft weaponry and assigned to the US Task Force 127 to carry the Flag of the United States Navy Service Force during the invasion of Normandy. Ceres was assigned as one of the two Shuttle Control ships at Omaha Beach and, anchored inshore, directed the assembly and departure of unloaded, outbound vessels and convoys. Shuttle Control Command, embarked in HMS Capetown anchored offshore, directed both Ceres for outbound vessels and the inbound Shuttle Control exercised from Capetown.

Subsequently, following the destruction of the artificial harbour off Omaha Beach during the Great Storm that occurred approximately two weeks after 6 June 1944 and as a result of the German demolition of the Port of Cherbourg in late June, HMS Ceres and her sister ship, HMS Capetown, was assigned to the task of Shuttle Control, expediting the passage and unloading of vessels from the UK to Omaha and Utah Beaches. HMS Ceres remained "On Station" off Omaha Beach for the entire summer of 1944 from the early hours of 7 June until the end of August, 1944. When Cherbourg became available to shipping from the UK, HMS Ceres returned to Plymouth for overhaul and those US naval officers who had staffed the "Shuttle Control Operation" were reassigned. After the end of the war, and by now obsolete, she was again placed in reserve and used as an accommodation/base ship at Portsmouth. She spent less than a year in this new role however. Ceres was sold and broken up for scrap at Bolckow, Blyth in July 1946, after 29 years in service.

== Bibliography ==
- Colledge, J. J.; Warlow, Ben & Bush, Steve (2020). Ships of the Royal Navy: The Complete Record of all Fighting Ships of the Royal Navy from the 15th Century to the Present (5th revised and updated ed.). Seaforth Publishing. ISBN 978-1-5267-9327-0.
- Friedman, Norman (2010). British Cruisers: Two World Wars and After. Seaforth Publishing. ISBN 978-1-59114-078-8.
- Lenton, H. T. (1998). British & Empire Warships of the Second World War. Naval Institute Press. ISBN 1-55750-048-7.
- Preston, Antony (1985). "Great Britain and Empire Forces". In Gray, Randal (ed.). Conway's All the World's Fighting Ships 1906–1921. Naval Institute Press. pp. 1–104. ISBN 0-85177-245-5.
- Raven, Alan & Roberts, John (1980). British Cruisers of World War Two. Naval Institute Press. ISBN 0-87021-922-7.
- Rohwer, Jürgen (2005). Chronology of the War at Sea 1939–1945: The Naval History of World War Two (Third Revised ed.). Naval Institute Press. ISBN 1-59114-119-2.
- Wavell, Archibald (1946). Operations in the Somaliland Protectorate, 1939–1940 (Appendix A – G. M. R. Reid and A. R. Godwin-Austen). London: London Gazette. published in "No. 37594". The London Gazette. 4 June 1946. pp. 2719–2727.
- Whitley, M. J. (1995). Cruisers of World War Two: An International Encyclopedia. Cassell. ISBN 1-86019-874-0.
