= HMS Calcutta (D82) =

C-class light cruiser of the Royal Navy

Coordinates: 32°00′N 28°00′E

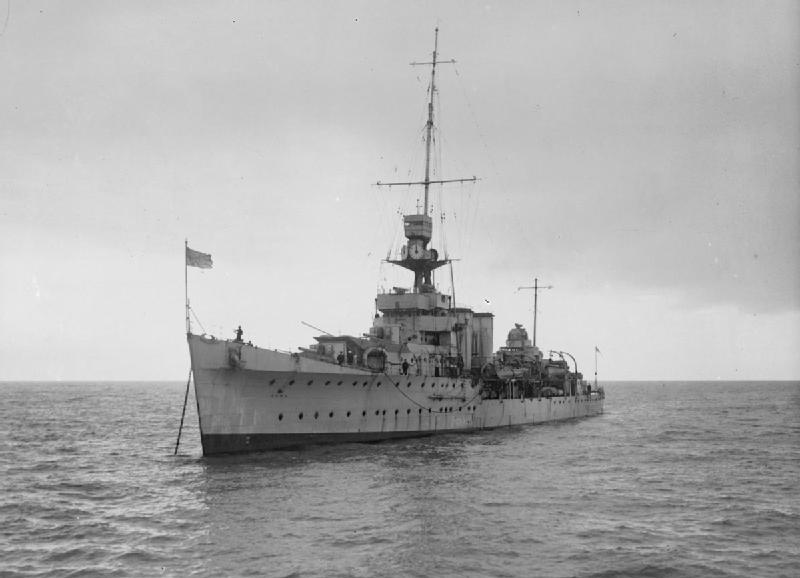

History

United Kingdom
- Name: Calcutta
- Builder: Vickers Limited, Barrow-in-Furness
- Laid down: 18 October 1917
- Launched: 9 July 1918
- Commissioned: 28 August 1919
- Reclassified: Converted to anti-aircraft cruiser in 1939
- Identification: Pennant number: 74 (Aug 19); 82 (Nov 19); I.82 (1936); D.82 (1940)
- Fate: Sunk 1 June 1941 by air attack off Alexandria, Egypt

General characteristics
- Class & type: C-class light cruiser
- Displacement: 4,290 long tons (4,360 t) standard; 5,250 long tons (5,330 t) deep load
- Length: 451 ft 6 in (137.62 m) oa; 425 ft (130 m) pp
- Beam: 43 ft 6 in (13.26 m)
- Draught: 14 ft 3 in (4.34 m)
- Propulsion: Parsons geared turbines; Yarrow boilers; Two propellers; 40,000 shp (30,000 kW)
- Speed: 29 knots (54 km/h; 33 mph)
- Range: Carried 300 tons (950 tons maximum) of fuel oil
- Complement: 330–350
- Armament: 5 × 6-inch (152 mm) guns; 2 × 3-inch (76 mm) anti-aircraft guns; 4 × 3-pounder guns; 2 × 2-pounder pom-poms; 1 × machine gun; 8 × 21 inch (533 mm) torpedo tubes
- Armour: 3 in (76 mm) side (amidships); 2 1/4–1 1/2 in (57–38 mm) side (bows); 2 in (51 mm) side (stern); 1 in (25 mm) upper decks (amidships); 1 in (25 mm) deck over rudder

HMS Calcutta was a C-class light cruiser of the Royal Navy, named after the Indian city of Calcutta. She was part of the Carlisle group of the C class of cruisers. She was laid down by Vickers Limited at Barrow-in-Furness in 1917 and launched on 9 July 1918. Calcutta was commissioned too late to see action in the First World War and was converted to an anti-aircraft cruiser in 1939. Calcutta served during the Norwegian Campaign and the evacuation from Dunkirk in 1940. She was used to escort allied convoys across the Mediterranean and was sunk on 1 June 1941 by Luftwaffe aircraft off Alexandria, Egypt.

== Construction and design ==
Calcutta was laid down at Vickers' Barrow-in-Furness shipyard on 28 January 1917 and launched on 9 July 1918, completing in August 1919.

The ship was 451 feet 6 inches (137.62 m) long overall and 425 feet (129.54 m) between perpendiculars, with a beam of 43 feet 6 inches (13.26 m) and a draught of 14 feet 3 inches (4.34 m). Displacement was 4,290 long tons (4,360 t) normal and 5,250 long tons (5,330 t) deep load. Six Yarrow boilers fed steam to two sets of Parsons geared steam turbines rated at 40,000 shaft horsepower (30,000 kW), giving a design speed of 29 knots (54 km/h; 33 mph).

As built, Calcutta's main armament consisted of five BL 6 inch Mk XII naval guns, carried in single mounts, with an anti-aircraft armament of two QF 3-inch 20 cwt guns and two 2-pounder pom-pom autocannon. Eight 21-inch (533 mm) torpedo tubes were carried, in four twin mounts. The ship had an armour belt of 3 inches (76 mm) amidships, thinning to 1 1/2 inches (38 mm) forward and 2 inches (51 mm) aft, with an armoured deck 1 inch (25 mm) thick protecting the ship's machinery. She had a complement of 432 officers and ratings.

=== Modification ===
In August 1938 Calcutta started conversion at Chatham Dockyard to an anti-aircraft cruiser. The conversion involved removal of all guns and torpedo tubes, with eight QF 4 inch Mk XVI naval guns in four twin mounts being fitted, with a close-in armament of a quadruple 2-pounder pom-pom and two quadruple Vickers .50 machine gun mounts. The conversion was completed in July 1939.

== Service ==
Following commissioning, Calcutta joined the 8th Light Cruiser Squadron on the North America and West Indies Station, based at the Royal Naval Dockyard in the Imperial fortress colony of Bermuda, as Flagship. In December 1919 it helped put down violence in Trinidad and Tobago during a General Strike there. On 6 March 1920, the American cargo ship SS Balabac caught fire in Port of Spain harbour. Calcutta sent some of her crew to try and fight the fire and used her boats to rescue Balabac's crew. Calcutta remained on the North America and West Indies Station until 1926 (when she was under the command of Captain AB Cunningham), when she sustained structural damage from being dashed against a jetty at the Bermuda dockyard in the 1926 Havana–Bermuda hurricane on 21 October. The dockface (or the wall) in the South Yard and old North Yard of the dockyard are on the eastern (Great Sound) shore of the island of Ireland (with the western shore on the open North Atlantic). Calcutta was tied (bow to the North) to the wall at the oiling wharf (at the northern end of the South Yard), where, during an unusually high tide, it was more exposed to the wind blowing eastward over the island, than it would have been in the more sheltered North Yard (where HMS Capetown tore up two bollards but otherwise rode out the storm safely), so forty hawsers were used, but all snapped when the windspeed reached 138 mph (the highest speed recorded before the storm destroyed the dockyard's anemometer). Fortunately, the bow anchor had been dropped, and held as the stern was swung around to the eastward, into the channel (the entrance to the dockyard from the Great Sound) between the two breakwaters that protected the two sections of the dockyard, and the starboard beam of the ship contacted the end of the northern breakwater. Calcutta used her propulsion system to fight the wind that would have driven her backwards into the sound, and Executive Officer Commander HM Maltby and fifty other crew members jumped onto the breakwater and lashed the ship to the end of the breakwater, while Sub-Lieutenants Stephen Roskill of HMS Wistaria and Conrad Byron Alers-Hankey (a cousin of Alexander Maurice Alers Hankey, and brothers Maurice Pascal Alers Hankey, 1st Baron Hankey (the creator of the modern UK Cabinet Office) and Donald William Alers Hankey, and descendant of the Reverend William Alers Hankey (1771–1859), an ex-banker and the secretary of the London Missionary Society (LMS) for whom the town of Hankey, South Africa was named) of Capetown swam to attach two more lines to the oil wharf. The hurricane also sank the sloop Valerian while at sea.

Following repair and a period in reserve, Calcutta was recommissioned on 18 September 1929 as the flagship of the 6th Cruiser Squadron serving on the Africa Station, based at Simon's Town, South Africa, serving on that station until returning to the United Kingdom and paying off into reserve in 1931.

=== Second World War ===
Following conversion to an anti-aircraft cruiser, Calcutta joined the Home Fleet in August 1939 and in September was allocated to the Humber Force, acting as an anti-aircraft escort for convoys in the North Sea. She returned to the Home Fleet in February but continued to escort convoys as well as the Fleet.

In April 1940, Germany invaded Norway and Calcutta was one of the units of the Home Fleet deployed in response. From 22–23 April, Calcutta, along with the cruiser Birmingham, the destroyer Maori, the sloop Auckland and the French destroyers Bison and Foudroyant, escorted the French troopship Ville d'Alger which was landing troops at Namsos but the operations were disrupted by poor weather. On 30 April, operations began to evacuate British and French troops from Åndalsnes, with Calcutta providing anti-aircraft cover for the evacuation operations. Calcutta and Auckland evacuated the rearguard from Åndalsnes on the night of 1/2 May, with Calcutta embarking 756 officers and men.

At the end of May 1940, Calcutta took part in Operation Dynamo, the evacuation of the British Expeditionary Force from Dunkirk. She evacuated 656 troops on the night of 27/28 May 1940, when she operated off La Panne, and a further 1,200 troops on the night of 28/29 May. Calcutta again operated off Dunkirk on the night of 31 May/1 June, and was slightly damaged by near-misses by German bombs on 2 June.

Following the completion of the evacuation from Dunkirk, British Forces continued to operate in France, with Operation Aerial taking part in the second half of June 1940 to evacuate the remainder of British forces from ports in the west of France. Calcutta took part in Operation Aerial, providing anti-aircraft cover for evacuations from Saint-Jean-de-Luz in the far south-west of France, near the border with Spain from 23 to 25 June, when the Armistice between France and Germany ended the evacuations. On the return journey, Calcutta was in company with the Canadian destroyers HMCS Restigouche and Fraser, when on the evening of 25 June Calcutta collided with Fraser off the Gironde estuary, cutting the destroyer in two. The front of Fraser sank quickly, while the aft part was scuttled by Restigouche. Calcutta was undamaged.

On 30 August Calcutta set off from Gibraltar as part of Operation Hats, which had the purpose of strengthening the British Mediterranean Fleet based in Egypt while simultaneously escorting a supply convoy to Malta. Calcutta formed part of Force F, the reinforcements for the Mediterranean Fleet, and together with sister ship Coventry and the battleship Valiant delivered personnel and stores to Malta on 2 September after Force F met up with the Mediterranean Fleet, reaching Alexandria on 6 September. On 8 October 1940, Calcutta, together with Coventry and four destroyers, formed the close escort of Convoy MF.3 to Malta, reaching Malta on 11 September, with Calcutta and Coventry forming part of the escort of the return convoy MF4.

Calcutta provided anti-aircraft support for the battleships Warspite, Valiant and Barham when they bombarded Bardia on 3 January, then on 7 January set off from Alexandria as part of the escort of Malta Convoy MW5. This was part of a complex series of operations, with another Malta convoy, Operation Excess being simultaneously run from Gibraltar. Convoy MW5 arrived unharmed at Malta on 10 January, but the escort for the Operation Excess convoy was heavily hit by German dive bombers, sinking the cruiser Southampton and badly damaging the aircraft carrier Illustrious and the cruiser Gloucester. During March 1941, Calcutta escorted a series of troop convoys, known as Operation Lustre, carrying four British divisions from Egypt to Greece. An Italian attempt to attack these convoys resulted in the Battle of Cape Matapan in which three Italian heavy cruisers were sunk.

On 18 April 1941 Calcutta sailed with the Mediterranean Fleet when it escorted the fast transport Breconshire to Malta, continuing to escort the fleet as it bombarded the port of Tripoli on 20 April. On 24 April, the Mediterranean Fleet launched Operation Demon, the evacuation of British and Commonwealth forces from Greece, with Calcutta taking part in the evacuations. Between 6 and 12 May, Calcutta set out from Alexandria as part of the escort of Malta-bound convoy MW7, before joining the Operation Tiger convoy ferrying tanks from Gibraltar to Egypt.

On 20 May, Germany launched an invasion of Crete by airborne troops. The British Mediterranean Fleet deployed to counter any sea-borne reinforcement of the German forces, with three groups of cruisers and destroyers (Forces B, C and D) deployed to the north of Crete to intercept invasion convoys, while a force of battleships and destroyers (Force A1) provided cover in case the Italian Navy attempted to intervene. Calcutta was sent from Alexandria to join Force C, meeting it on 21 May. Force C came under heavy attack by German and Italian aircraft during 21 May, with the destroyer HMS Juno (F46) being sunk. On 22 May Force C intercepted a convoy of Caïques carrying German troops to Heraklion, escorted by the Sagittario. While the convoy was forced to turn back, heavy German air attacks caused the commander of Force C, Rear-Admiral King, to break off the attack. The air attacks damaged the cruisers Naiad and Carlisle before Force C rejoined the covering Force A1. Further attacks on the combined force damaged the battleships Warspite and Valiant and sank the cruisers Gloucester and Fiji and the destroyer Greyhound. Force A1 was ordered back to Alexandria early on 23 May to restock anti-aircraft ammunition.

On 27 May, the deteriorating situation on Crete resulted in the evacuation of Allied forces being ordered, with Calcutta along with the cruisers Coventry, Phoebe and Perth, the destroyers Jervis, Janus and Hasty and the transport Glengyle evacuating 6,000 troops from Sfakia on the night of 29/30 May 1941. On the night of 31 May/1 June 1941, a final effort was made to evacuate the remaining troops from Sfakia, with the cruiser Phoebe, the minelayer Abdiel and the destroyers Kimberley, Hotspur and Jackal picked up a further 3,710 men. Calcutta and Coventry set out from Alexandria on 1 June to provide extra anti-aircraft protection for this force, but the two ships were attacked by two Junkers Ju 88 bombers of Lehrgeschwader 1, which dived out of the sun, giving little warning, about 100 nautical miles (190 km) north-west of Alexandria. Calcutta was hit by two bombs and sank, with 255 men being rescued by Coventry and 107 men killed or missing.

== Bibliography ==
- Barnett, Correlli (2000). Engage The Enemy More Closely: The Royal Navy in the Second World War. Penguin. ISBN 0-141-39008-5.
- Colledge, J. J.; Warlow, Ben (2006) [1969]. Ships of the Royal Navy: The Complete Record of All Fighting Ships of the Royal Navy from the 15th Century to the Present (3rd Rev ed.). London: Chatham Publishing. ISBN 978-1-86176-281-8. OCLC 67375475.
- Friedman, Norman (2010). British Cruisers: Two World Wars and After. Seaforth Publishing. ISBN 978-1-59114-078-8.
- Kiely, Ray (1996). The Politics of Labour and Development in Trinidad. Press University of the West Indies. ISBN 9789766400170.
- Kemp, Paul (1999). The Admiralty Regrets: British Warship Losses of the 20th Century. Sutton Publishing. ISBN 0-7509-1567-6.
- Lenton, H. T. (1998). British & Empire Warships of the Second World War. Naval Institute Press. ISBN 1-55750-048-7.
- Parkes, Oscar (1973) [1931]. Jane's Fighting Ships 1931. David & Charles (Publishers). ISBN 0-7153-5849-9.
- Preston, Antony (1985). "Great Britain and Empire Forces". In Gray, Randal (ed.). Conway's All the World's Fighting Ships 1906–1921. Naval Institute Press. pp. 1–104. ISBN 0-85177-245-5.
- Rohwer, Jürgen; Hümmelchen, Gerhard (1992). Chronology of the War at Sea 1939–1945. Greenhill Books. ISBN 978-1-85367-117-3.
- Walrus (April 1959). "The Loss of H.C.M.S. Fraser" (PDF). The Naval Review. XLVII (2): 46–49. Archived from the original (PDF) on 27 September 2015.
- Whitley, M. J. (1999). Cruisers of World War Two: An International Encyclopedia. Brockhampton Press. ISBN 1-86019-8740.
- Winser, John de S. (1999). B.E.F. Ships before, at and after Dunkirk. World Ship Society. ISBN 0-905617-91-6.
