= Stephen Roskill =

British navy officer and historian (1903–1982)

Captain Stephen Roskill CBE DSC FBA
- Born: 1 August 1903; London, England
- Died: 4 November 1982 (aged 79); Cambridge, Cambridgeshire, England
- Relatives: Eustace Roskill, Baron Roskill
- Military career
- Allegiance: United Kingdom
- Branch: Royal Navy
- Service years: 1917–1949
- Rank: Captain
- Conflicts: Second World War
- Awards: Commander of the Order of the British Empire; Distinguished Service Cross; Legion of Merit (United States)
- Other work: Royal Navy Official Historian of the Second World War; Senior Research Fellow at Churchill College, Cambridge

Captain Stephen Wentworth Roskill, CBE, DSC, FBA (1 August 1903 – 4 November 1982) was a senior career officer of the Royal Navy who served during the Second World War and, after his retirement, was the official historian of the Royal Navy from 1949 to 1960. He is now chiefly remembered as a prodigious author of books on British maritime history.

== Naval career ==
The son of John Henry Roskill, K.C. a barrister, and Sybil Dilke, Stephen Roskill was born in London, England, on 1 August 1903 and joined the Royal Navy in 1917, attending the Royal Naval College at Osborne House and then the Royal Naval College at Dartmouth, Devon. As a midshipman, Roskill served on the light cruiser Durban on the China Station before returning to study gunnery, navigation, torpedoes and other subjects at Greenwich and Portsmouth.

On 22 October 1926, when he was a sub-lieutenant of HMS Wistaria based at the Royal Naval Dockyard in the Imperial fortress colony of Bermuda on the America and West Indies Station, Roskill assisted in rescuing HMS Calcutta from almost certain destruction during the 1926 Havana–Bermuda hurricane. The dockface (or "the wall") in the South Yard and old North Yard of the Bermudian dockyard are on the eastern (Great Sound) shore of the island of Ireland (with the western shore on the open North Atlantic). Calcutta was tied (bow to the North) to the wall at the oiling wharf (at the northern end of the South Yard), where, during an unusually high tide, she was more exposed to the wind blowing eastward over the island, than she would have been in the more sheltered North Yard (where HMS Capetown tore up two bollards but otherwise rode out the storm safely), so forty hawsers were used to lash her to the shore, but all snapped when the windspeed reached 138 mph (the highest speed recorded before the storm destroyed the dockyard's anemometer). Fortunately, the bow anchor had been dropped, and held as the stern was swung around to the westward, into the channel (the entrance to the dockyard from the Great Sound) between the two breakwaters that protected the two sections of the dockyard, and the starboard beam of the ship contacted the end of the northern breakwater. Calcutta used her propulsion system to fight the wind that would have driven her backwards into the sound, and Executive Officer Commander HM Maltby and fifty other crew members jumped onto the breakwater and lashed the ship to the end of the breakwater, while Roskill, and Sub-Lieutenant Conrad Alers-Hankey of Capetown, swam to attach two more lines to the oil wharf. The hurricane also sank the sister-ship of Wistaria, the sloop Valerian, which was trapped outside of Bermuda's reefline when the storm arrived.

In 1930, he married Elizabeth Van den Bergh, with whom he had seven children. Roskill served at sea as gunnery officer of the carrier Eagle on the China Station from 1933 to 1935. Afterwards he instructed at the gunnery school HMS Excellent, and in 1936 he was given the prize gunnery appointment in the navy, that of the newly reconstructed dreadnought Warspite till 1939, was a member of the Naval Staff, 1939–1941, then served as executive officer of HMNZS Leander in 1941–1944. (Note: The executive officer (XO) and second-in-command of a capital ship was known as "the commander".)

On 13 July 1943 Leander was part of a task group of predominantly American warships off the Solomon Islands, when they engaged a force of Imperial Japanese Navy ships. During the action, Leander was torpedoed and severely damaged. For his actions in helping keep the ship afloat, Roskill was awarded the Distinguished Service Cross. In March 1944 he was promoted acting captain and sent to join the British Admiralty delegation in Washington, D.C. as chief staff officer for administration and weapons. He was the senior British observer at the Bikini Atomic tests in 1946, and served as Deputy Director of Naval Intelligence, 1946–48 before retiring as a captain, due to increasing deafness caused by exposure to gun detonations.

== Career as a naval historian ==
On retiring from active service in 1948, Roskill was appointed by the Cabinet Office Historical Section to write the official naval history of the Second World War. His three-volume work The War at Sea was published between 1954 and 1961.

In 1961, Roskill was elected a senior research fellow of Churchill College, Cambridge, where he was instrumental in the foundation of the Churchill Archives Centre. The centre holds 300 boxes of Roskill's personal and research papers. After retirement, he was a visiting lecturer at several universities, including being Lees Knowles Lecturer in 1961, the distinguished visiting lecturer at the U.S. Naval Academy in 1965, and Richmond Lecturer at Cambridge University in 1967. He was elected a vice president of the Navy Records Society in 1964 and an honorary vice president in 1974.

== Honours and awards ==
Roskill was awarded the Distinguished Service Cross on 21 March 1944 as commander in HMNZS Leander when she was torpedoed in the Pacific. In 1946 he was awarded the American Legion of Merit. He was made a Commander of the Order of the British Empire in the 1971 New Year Honours List.

Roskill received honorary Doctor of Literature degrees from Cambridge University in 1970, from the University of Leeds in 1971, and from Oxford University in 1980.

He was elected a Fellow of The British Academy.

== Dates of rank ==
- Midshipman – 15 September 1921
- Sub-lieutenant – 30 July 1924
- Lieutenant – 30 August 1925
- Lieutenant-commander – 30 August 1933
- Commander – 31 December 1938
- Captain – 30 June 1944

== Published works ==
- Escort. The Battle of the Atlantic by Denys Arthur Rayner and edited by S. W. Roskill (1955)
- HMS Warspite. The story of a famous battleship (1957) – HMS Warspite
- The Secret Capture. (On the capture of the German submarine U-110 (1940) during the Second World War). (1959)
- The War at Sea, 1939–1945 Three volumes published from 1954–61 of the British official history series, the History of the Second World War, all edited by J. R. M. Butler
  - Volume 1: The Defensive (1954)
  - Volume 2: The Period of Balance (1956)
  - Volume 3: The Offensive, Part 1 (1960)
  - Volume 3: The Offensive, Part 2 (1961)
- The Navy at War, 1939–1945 Published in the US as The White Ensign: The British Navy at War, 1939–1945 (1960)
- The Strategy of Sea Power. Its development and application. Based on the Lees-Knowles Lectures ... 1961 (1962)
- A Merchant Fleet in War. Alfred Holt & Co., 1939–1945. (1962)
- The Strategy of Sea Power (1962, 1984)
- The Art of Leadership (1964)
- Naval Policy Between the Wars.
  - Vol. 1, The period of Anglo-American antagonism, 1919–1929
  - Vol. 2, The period of reluctant rearmament, 1930–1939 (1968, 1976)
- Documents relating to the Royal Naval Air Service (1969)
- Hankey: Man Of Secrets (1877–1918). Vol. I. Collins. 1970. ISBN 0-00-211327-9.
- Hankey: Man Of Secrets (1919–1931). Vol. II. Collins. 1972. ISBN 0-00-211330-9.
- Hankey: Man Of Secrets (1931–1963). Vol. III. Collins. 1974. ISBN 0-00-211332-5.
- The eventful history of the mutiny and piratical seizure of HMS Bounty, its causes and consequences by Sir John Barrow - edited with an introduction by S. W. Roskill (1976)
- Churchill and the admirals (1977, 2004)
- Admiral of the Fleet Earl Beatty: The Last Naval Hero: An Intimate Biography (1980)
