= C-class cruiser =

1914 light cruiser class of the British Royal Navy

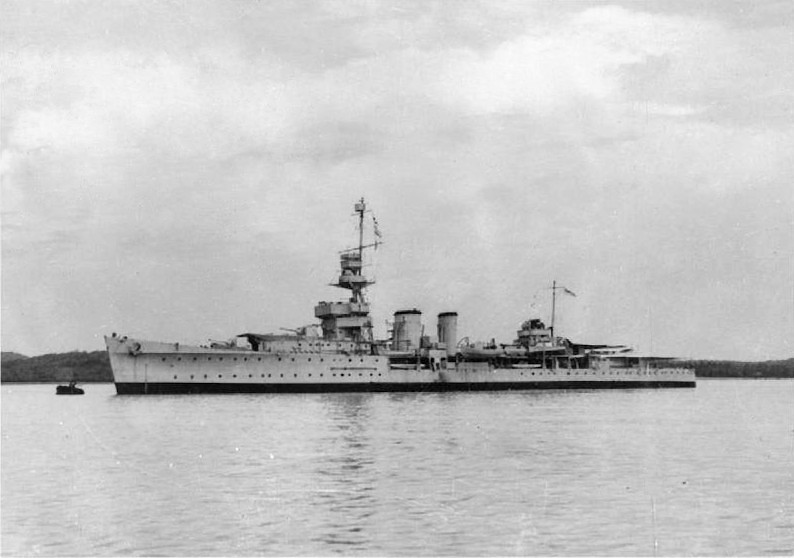
- Capetown, circa 1922

Class overview
- Name: C class
- Builders: Cammell Laird (6); Chatham Dockyard (2); Devonport Dockyard (1); Fairfields (3); John Brown (2); Pembroke Dockyard (4); Hawthorn Leslie (2); Scotts (1); Swan Hunter (2); Vickers Limited (5)
- Operators: Royal Navy
- Preceded by: Arethusa class
- Succeeded by: Danae class
- Subclasses: Caroline; Calliope; Cambrian; Centaur; Caledon; Ceres; Carlisle
- In service: 1914–2011
- Completed: 28
- Lost: 7
- Preserved: 1

General characteristics
- Type: Light cruiser
- Displacement: 4,180 long tons (4,250 t) (standard); 4,950 long tons (5,030 t) (deep load)
- Length: 450 ft (137.2 m) (o/a)
- Beam: 43 ft (13 m)
- Draught: 14 ft (4.3 m)
- Installed power: Six boilers; 40,000 shp (30,000 kW)
- Propulsion: Two shafts; 2 geared steam turbines
- Speed: 28.5 knots (52.8 km/h; 32.8 mph)
- Range: 5,900 nmi (10,900 km; 6,800 mi) at 10 knots (19 km/h; 12 mph)
- Complement: 325
- Armament: 2 × single 6 in (152 mm) guns; 8 × single 4 in (102 mm) guns; 1 × single 6 pdr (57 mm (2.2 in)) gun; 2 × twin 21 in (533 mm) torpedo tubes
- Armour: Side: 2.25–3 in (57–76 mm); deck: 1 in (25 mm)

The C class was a group of twenty-eight light cruisers of the Royal Navy, and were built in seven groups known as the Caroline class (six ships), the Calliope class (two ships), the Cambrian class (four ships), the Centaur class (two ships), the Caledon class (four ships), the Ceres class (five ships) and the Carlisle class (five ships). They were built for the rough conditions of the North Sea, and proved to be rugged and capable vessels, despite being somewhat small and cramped.

== The Caroline class ==
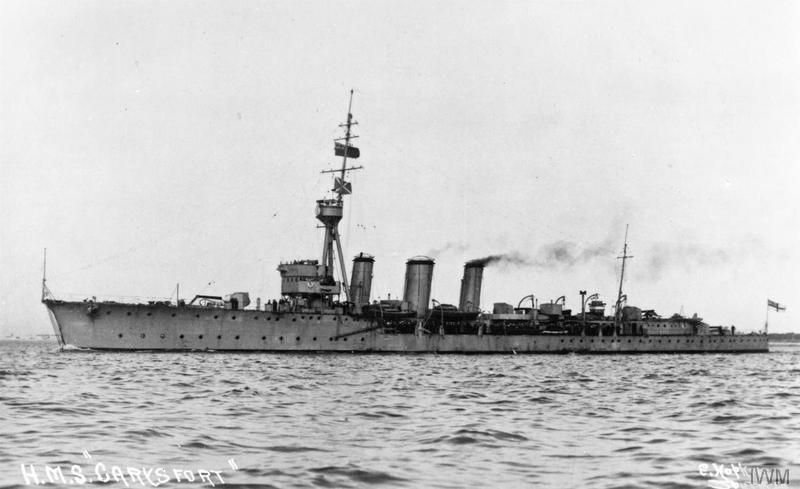
HMS Carysfort

The Caroline class were all ordered in July and August 1913, as the first six of eight "light armoured cruisers" under the 1913 programme. The ships were launched in 1914 or 1915 and commissioned in 1915. They had an armament of two single 6 in aft, eight 4 in and two 6-pounder guns. Their anti-aircraft (A/A) weaponry consisted of four 3-pounder. Their aft 6 in guns were superfiring; the class had three funnels. During the First World War, the ships of the class underwent a variety of alterations, including the removal of the 4-inch (102 mm) guns in Caroline, Carysfort and Comus, being replaced by two extra 6-inch (152 mm) guns, while Cleopatra, Conquest and Cordelia retained one or two of the 4-inch (102 mm) guns, with two 2-pounder guns being added to some of the ships.

=== Ships ===
- Caroline was built by Cammell Laird and Company, Birkenhead. She was laid down on 28 January 1914, launched on 29 September 1914, and completed in December. She became a drill ship for the Royal Navy Volunteer Reserve in April 1924 and fulfilled that role in Alexandra Dock, Belfast until 31 March 2011, when she was decommissioned. In May 2013 the Heritage Lottery Fund announced an £845,600 grant to support her conversion to a museum.
- Carysfort was built by Pembroke Dockyard. Laid down on 25 February 1914, she was launched on 14 November 1914, and completed in June 1915. She was sold for breaking up in August 1931.
- Cleopatra was built by Devonport Dockyard. Laid down on 26 February 1914, she was launched on 14 January 1915, and completed in June. She was sold for breaking up in June 1931.
- Comus was built by Swan Hunter and Wigham Richardson, Wallsend on Tyne. Laid down on 3 November 1913, she was launched on 16 December 1914, and completed in January 1915. She was sold for breaking up on 28 July 1934.
- Conquest was built by Chatham Dockyard. She was laid down on 3 March 1914, launched on 20 January 1915, and completed in June. She was sold for breaking up on 29 August 1930.
- Cordelia was built by Pembroke Dockyard. She was laid down on 21 July 1913, launched on 23 February 1914, and completed in June. She was sold for breaking up 31 July 1923.

== The Calliope class ==
The two ships of the Calliope sub-class – HMS Calliope and Champion – were the last pair of the eight "light armoured cruisers" to be ordered in July and August 1913 under the 1913 Programme. They both had geared steam turbines, the first Royal Navy cruisers to be so fitted. They also had increased belt armour; Champion had just two screws. They were commissioned in mid to late 1915, as modifications to the Caroline subclass with higher speeds, a more efficient boiler layout and a reduction in the number of funnels to two. The two ships had different machinery types for comparative purposes. Calliope and Champion underwent similar gun armament modifications to the Caroline subclass. They also had underwater tubes rather than the deck mounted weapons of the Caroline subclass and were given two twin deck mounted torpedo tubes during the war but these were later removed to reduce top weight.

=== Ships ===
- Calliope: Built by Chatham Dockyard, she was laid down on 1 January 1914, and launched on 17 December; she was completed in June 1915. She was sold for breaking up on 28 August 1931.
- Champion: Built by R. & W. Hawthorn Leslie and Company, Hebburn on Tyne, she was laid on down 9 March 1914, launched on 29 May 1915, and completed in December 1915. She was sold for breaking up on 28 July 1934.

== The Cambrian class ==
The Cambrian class were ordered in September 1914 under the 1914–15 Programme, and commissioned between 1915 and 1916. The ships had two funnels rather than the three of the Caroline subclass, following on from the developments in the Calliope subclass. The Cambrian subclass had similar armament to the previous sub-class, with their main armament being four 6-inch (152 mm) guns in single mounts. Their secondary armament consisted of eight 4-inch (102 mm) guns. They were later removed, with Canterbury and Champion retaining one single 4-inch (102 mm) gun. The rest of the ships used either two or three 3-inch (76 mm) guns.

=== Ships ===
- Cambrian; she was built by Pembroke Dockyard, having been laid down on 8 December 1914, she was launched on 3 March 1916, and completed in May. She was sold for breaking up on 28 July 1934.
- Canterbury, built by John Brown and Company, Clydebank; she was laid down on 14 October 1914, and launched on 21 December 1915; she was completed in May 1916. She was sold for breaking up on 28 July 1934.
- Castor; she was built by Cammell Laird, having been laid down on 28 October 1914; she was launched on 28 July 1915, and completed in November. She was sold for breaking up on 30 July 1936.
- Constance, was built by Cammell Laird; she was laid down on 25 January 1915, launched 12 September, and completed in January 1916. She was sold for breaking up on 8 June 1936.

== The Centaur class ==
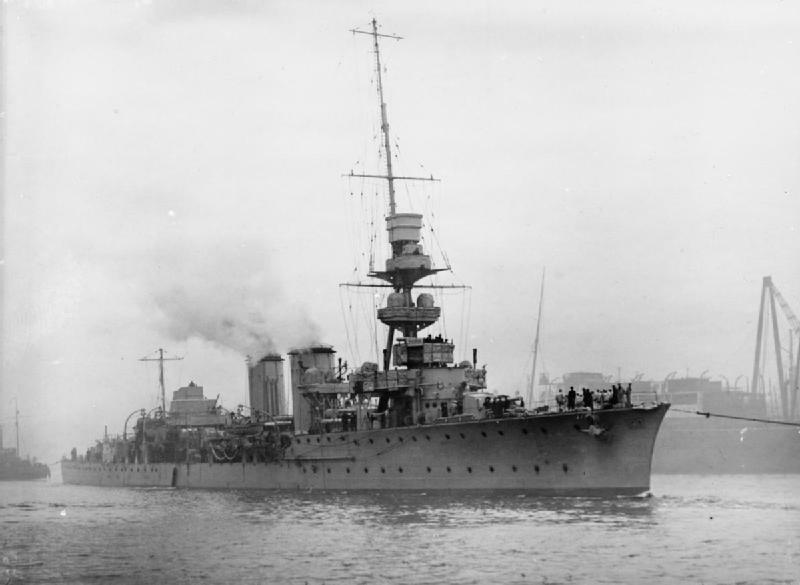
HMS Centaur (1916)

The Centaur subclass were ordered in December 1914, and built using materials originally intended for two scout cruisers to be built for Turkey. These vessels were launched and commissioned in 1916. The class also had geared turbines as well as four screws. They retained the two funnels introduced to the C class by the Cambrians. Their main armament was five 6 in guns in single mounts. Their 4-inch (102 mm) guns were mostly replaced in a similar fashion to the previous sub-classes, with smaller calibre weapons.

=== Ships ===
- Centaur; she was built by Sir W.G. Armstrong-Whitworth & Co., Ltd., Walker on Tyne; she was laid down on 24 January 1915, launched on 6 January 1916, and completed in August 1916. She was sold for breaking up in February 1934.
- Concord; she was built by Armstrong-Whitworth having been laid down on 1 February 1915, launched on 1 April 1916, and completed in December. She was sold for breaking up in August 1935.

== The Caledon class ==
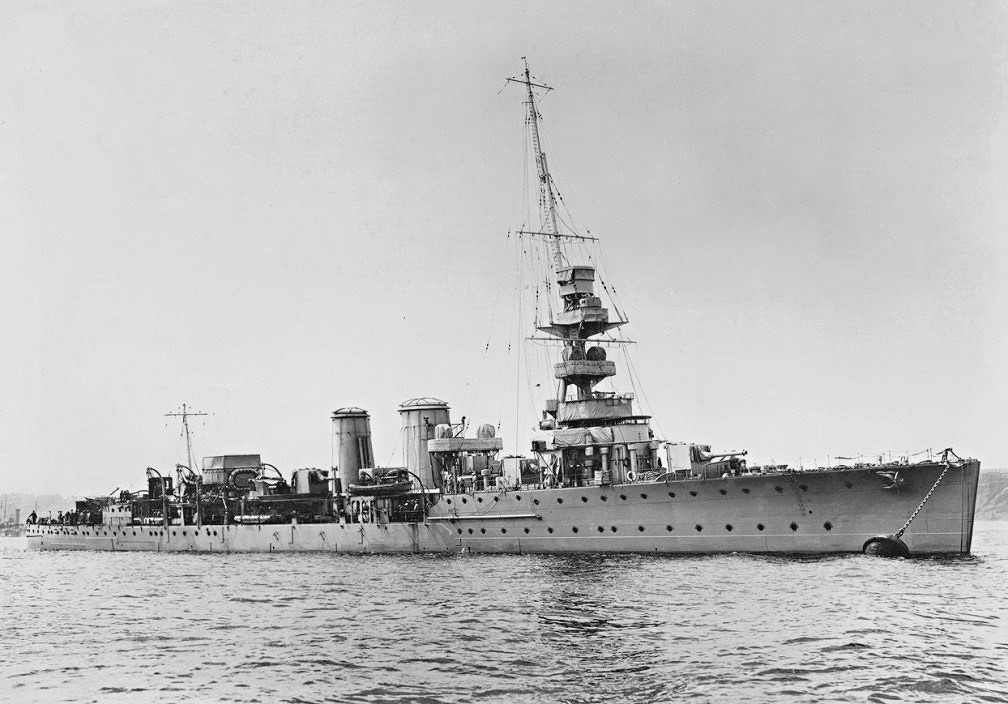
HMS Calypso

Class overview
- Name: Caledon subclass
- Completed: 4
- Lost: 2

General characteristics
- Displacement: 4,180 tons (standard), 4,950 tons (full load)
- Length: 450 ft (140 m) overall
- Beam: 43 ft (13 m)
- Draught: 14 ft (4.3 m)
- Installed power: Six boilers; 40,000 shp (30,000 kW)
- Propulsion: 2 shafts; geared steam turbines
- Speed: 29 knots (54 km/h; 33 mph)
- Range: 5,900 nmi (10,900 km; 6,800 mi) at 10 knots (19 km/h; 12 mph)
- Complement: 334
- Armament: 5 × single 6 in (152 mm) guns; 2 × single 3 in (76 mm); 2 × single 2 pdr (40 mm (1.6 in)) AA guns; 4 × twin 21 in (533 mm) torpedo tubes
- Armour: machinery spaces: 3 inch sides; magazines: 2 1/4 inch sides; deck: 1 inch

The Caledon class were all ordered in December 1915 and commissioned in 1917. The ships retained the two funnels of the previous two sub-classes. Their propulsion was slightly different from the previous sub-classes. Their superstructure was also slightly altered. They had a main armament of five 6-inch (152 mm) guns and a secondary armament of two 3 in guns, as well as an AA armament of four 3 pounder guns. The surviving ships of the class saw World War II, undergoing a number of modifications along the way. Five Oerlikon 20 mm cannons were added to all ships. Caledon herself had a different armament, as she underwent an extensive rebuild to become an AA cruiser. She was armed with the effective 4-inch (102 mm) gun, of which she had twelve, two 40 mm Bofors and eight 20 mm Oerlikons.

=== Ships ===
- Caledon was built by Cammell Laird; she was laid down on 17 March 1916, launched on 25 November, and was completed in March 1917. She became an AA ship in December 1943; she was sold for breaking up on 22 January 1948.
- Calypso was built by Hawthorn Leslie; she was laid down on 7 February 1916, launched on 24 January 1917, and completed in June. She was sunk by the Italian submarine Alpino Bagnolini south of Crete on 12 June 1940.
- Cassandra was built by Vickers, Barrow in Furness; she was laid down March 1916, launched 25 November 1916, and completed in June 1917. She was sunk by a mine in the Baltic on 5 December 1918.
- Caradoc was built by Scott's Shipuilding and Engineering Company in Greenock; she was laid down on 21 February 1916, launched 23 December, and was completed in June 1917. She became a base ship in April 1944, and was sold for breaking up in May 1946.

== The Ceres class ==
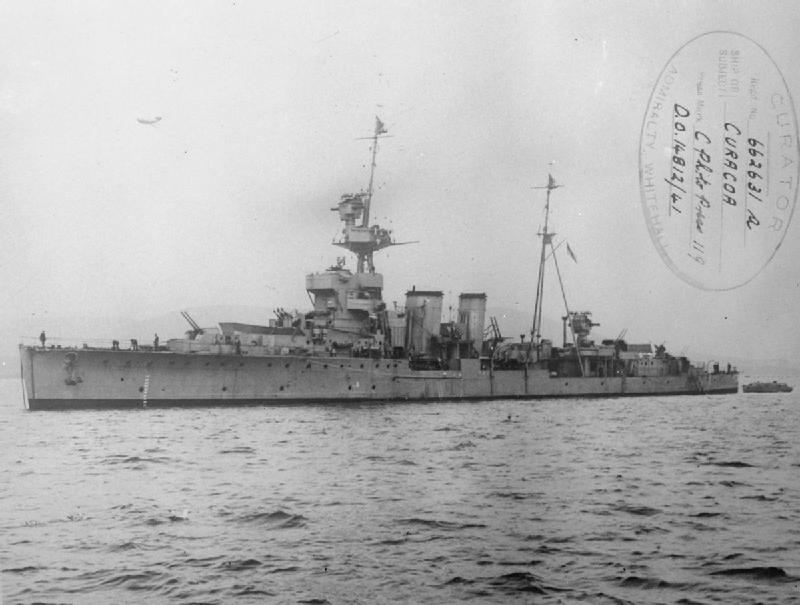
HMS Curacoa in 1941

Class overview
- Name: Ceres subclass
- Completed: 5
- Lost: 3

General characteristics
- Displacement: 4,290 tons (standard); 5,276 tons (full load)
- Length: 452 ft (138 m) overall
- Beam: 43.5 ft (13.3 m)
- Draught: 14 ft (4.3 m)
- Installed power: 6 boilers; 40,000 shp (30,000 kW)
- Propulsion: 2 shafts; geared steam turbines
- Speed: 29.5 knots (54.6 km/h; 33.9 mph)
- Range: 5,900 nmi (10,900 km; 6,800 mi) at 10 knots (19 km/h; 12 mph); AA conversions: 3,250 nmi (6,020 km; 3,740 mi) at 12 knots (22 km/h; 14 mph)
- Complement: 334
- Armament: Cardiff and Ceres: 5 × single 6 in (152 mm) guns; 2 × single 3 in (76 mm); 2 × single 2 pdr AA guns; 4 × twin 21 in (533 mm) torpedo tubes; Coventry and Curlew (modified 1936); 10 × single 4 in (102 mm) AA guns; 2 × octuple 2 pdr AA guns; Curacoa (modified 1939); 4 × twin 4 in (102 mm) DP guns; 4 × single 2 pdr AA guns
- Armour: machinery spaces: 3 inch sides; magazines: 2 1/4 inch sides; deck: 1 inch

The Ceres class were ordered in March and April 1916 and commissioned in 1917 and 1918. These ships were very "wet" forward, which was remedied in the subsequent Carlisle sub-class with the addition of a "trawler bow". Their main armament consisted of five 6-inch (152 mm) guns, while their secondary armament consisted of two 3-inch (76 mm) weapons, of which a further one was later added to Ceres herself. Four 3-pounder guns were also fitted.

Three ships underwent extensive rebuilds during the 1930s, becoming anti-aircraft (AA) cruisers, resulting in all previous armament being removed. The ships were Coventry, Curacoa and Curlew, with Curacoa being the last of the three to be rebuilt in 1939; the other two ships having been converted in 1935. Coventry and Curlew were given ten QF 4 inch Mk V naval gun for their AA role, disposed in single mounts one forward, three on each beam and three aft. Sixteen QF 2-pounder naval gun Mark VIII as two 8-barelled Mark VI mountings ("multiple pom-poms") were fitted aft (one removed by 1939). Torpedo tubes were removed, and two High-Angle HACS gun directors and a Pom-Pom director added. Curacoa received similar gun directors but a slightly different armament, being equipped with eight QF 4 inch Mk XVI naval gun in twin mountings replacing 6 inch guns number 1,3,4 and 5; and four QF 2-pounder naval gun Mark VIII as a 4-barelled Mark VII mounting ("multiple pom-pom") replacing 6 inch gun number 2 forward of the bridge. Later on in the Second World War, four 20 mm Oerlikons were added. Cardiff and Ceres were to have undergone the same conversion, but this was prevented by the outbreak of war.

=== Ships ===
- Cardiff was built by Fairfield Shipbuilding and Engineering Company, in Govan; she was laid down on 22 July 1916, launched on 12 April 1917, and completed in June. She was sold for breaking up on 23 January 1946.
- Ceres built by John Brown; she was laid down on 11 July 1916, launched on 24 March 1917, and completed in June. She was sold for breaking up on 5 April 1946.
- Coventry was built by Swan Hunter; she was laid down on 4 August 1916, launched on 6 July 1917, and completed in February 1918. She became an AA ship in 1937; but was sunk by aircraft off Tobruk in the Mediterranean on 14 September 1942.
- Curacoa was built by Pembroke Dockyard; she was laid down in July 1916, launched on 5 May 1917, and completed in February 1918. She became an AA ship in 1939; she was sunk in a collision with RMS Queen Mary north of Ireland on 2 October 1942.
- Curlew was built by Vickers; she was laid down on 21 August 1916, launched on 5 July 1917, and was completed in December 1917. She became an AA ship in 1938; but was sunk by aircraft in Ofotfjord, Norway, on 26 May 1940.

== The Carlisle class ==
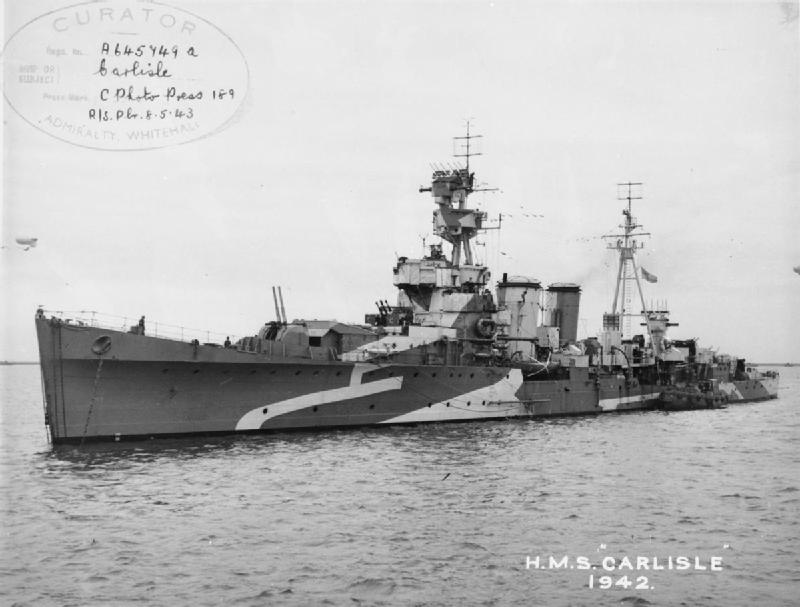
HMS Carlisle in dazzle camouflage in Plymouth Sound, 1942

Class overview
- Name: Carlisle subclass
- Completed: 5
- Lost: 2

General characteristics
- Displacement: 4,200 tons (standard); 5,300 tons (full load)
- Length: 452 ft (138 m) overall
- Beam: 43.5 ft (13.3 m)
- Draught: 14 ft (4.3 m)
- Installed power: Six boilers; 40,000 shp (30,000 kW)
- Propulsion: 2 shafts; geared steam turbines
- Speed: 29 knots (54 km/h; 33 mph)
- Range: 5,900 nmi (10,900 km; 6,800 mi) at 10 knots (19 km/h; 12 mph)
- Complement: 334
- Armament: Capetown and Colombo: 5 × single 6 in (152 mm) guns; 2 × single 3 in (76 mm); 2 × single 2 pdr AA guns; 4 × twin 21 in (533 mm) torpedo tubes; Cairo, Carlisle and Calcutta (as modified 1938/39): 4 × twin 4 in (102 mm) DP guns; 1 × quadruple 2 pdr AA guns
- Armour: Machinery spaces: 3-inch (76 mm) sides; Magazines: 2 1/4-inch (57 mm) sides; Deck: 1-inch (25 mm)

The Carlisle class were ordered in June and July 1917 under the War Emergency Programme, and commissioned between 1918 and 1922. They differed from the previous sub-class, with the addition of a "trawler bow" which raised the bow higher, as well as having no conning tower. They had an armament of five 6-inch (152 mm) guns in single mounts, while their secondary armament consisted of two 3-inch (76 mm) guns, four 3-pounders and two 2-pounder guns.

=== Ships ===
- Cairo was built by Cammell Laird, Birkenhead; she was laid down on 28 November 1917, launched on 19 November 1918, and completed on 23 September 1919. She became an AA ship in 1939; she was sunk by the Italian submarine Axum in the Mediterranean on 12 August 1942.
- Calcutta was built by Vickers, Barrow in Furness; she was laid down on 18 October 1917, launched on 9 July 1918, and completed in August 1919. She became an AA ship in 1939; she was sunk by air attack during the evacuation of Crete on 1 June 1941.
- Capetown was built by Cammell Laird; she was laid down 23 February 1918, launched on 28 June 1919 and then towed to Pembroke Dockyard where she was completed in April 1922. She was sold for breaking up on 5 April 1946.
- Carlisle (ex-Cawnpore), was built by the Fairfield Shipbuilding and Engineering Company, Govan; she was laid down on 2 October 1917 and launched on 9 July 1918; she was completed in November 1918. She became an AA ship in 1939; she then became a base ship in 1944; she was sold for breaking up at Alexandria in 1948.
- Colombo was built by Fairfield; she was laid down on 8 December 1917, launched 18 December 1918, and completed in July 1919. She became an AA ship in 1943; she was sold for breaking up on 22 January 1948.

All ships of the class except Colombo and Capetown were converted into AA cruisers in 1939, although Capetown received six 20 mm guns and radar. The ships' main armament consisted of eight 4-inch (102 mm) guns in four twin turrets with varying numbers of 20 mm Oerlikons being added. Colombo was finally converted to an AA cruiser in 1942, with her armament consisting of eight 4-inch (102 mm) guns and six 20 mm Oerlikons. All the AA cruiser conversions followed a similar pattern to that of HMS Curacoa (D41).

== First World War service ==
In March 1916, Cleopatra rammed and sank the German destroyer G 194 while she covered a raid at Tondern. Ships of the C class were extensively involved later that year in the Battle of Jutland. In 1917, Centaur hit mines that blew her bow and stern off. Despite the extensive damage, Centaur survived and was repaired. The year also saw ships of the class involved in action at the Second Battle of Heligoland Bight.

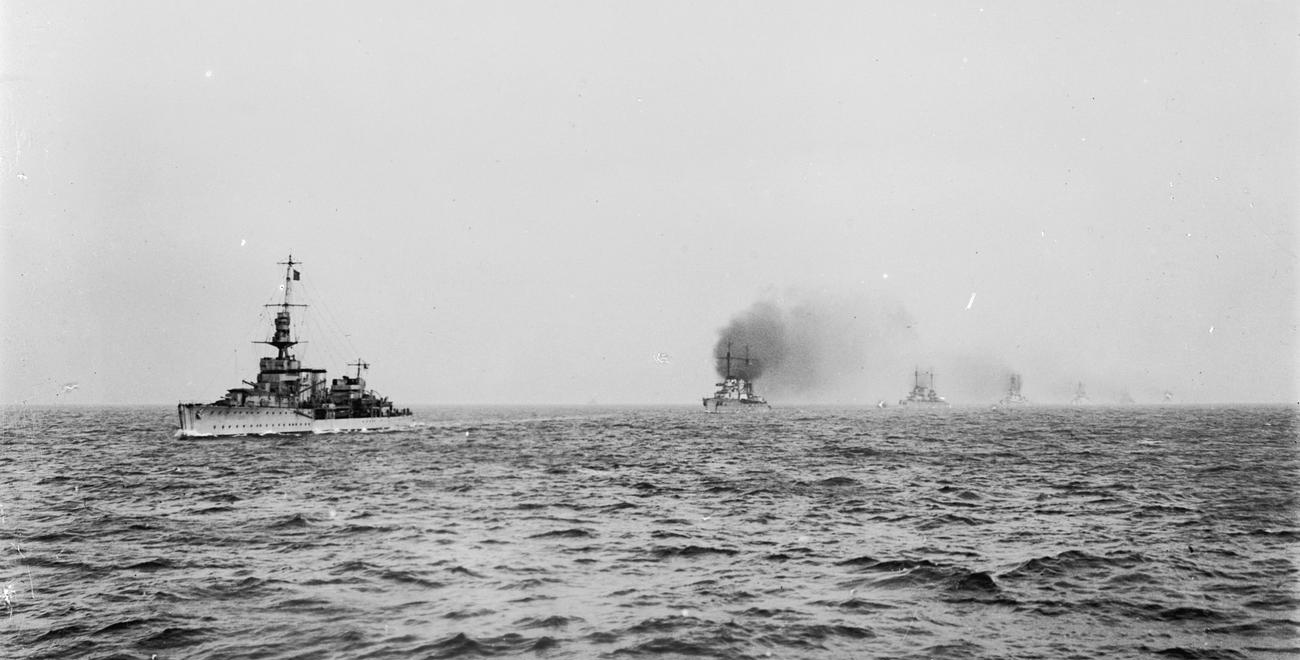
Cardiff leading German battle-cruisers into the Firth of Forth at the end of the First World War

In 1918, Cardiff had the honour of leading the German High Seas Fleet to the River Forth, where the ships were held before being moved to various other ports.

No C-class ships were lost during the First World War; however, in December 1918, Cassandra hit a mine and subsequently sank.

Ships of the C class performed a variety of duties after World War I, including service on overseas stations. In 1919, Curacoa hit a mine that badly damaged her, but she survived and was repaired. The Caroline, Cambrian and Centaur classes were all scrapped or consigned to minor roles, such as training ships, by the 1930s.

== Conversion ==
In the mid-1930s it was decided to modernise and refit the C class cruisers for anti-aircraft work. The aim was to convert all 13 cruisers of the late C (Caledon, Ceres and Carlisle) classes. The conversions between 1935 and 1936 of HMS Coventry and Curlew served as prototypes.

Coventry and Curlew first had all armament removed. This was replaced with 10 single mount 4 inch high angle (HA) guns and two eight-barreled 2-pounder "pom-pom" mounts. The previous gun directors were removed and replaced with two suitable for anti-aircraft gun control. To keep costs down, only limited structural work was carried out, but the masts were altered. In 1938, because of a shortage of this weapon, the aft pom-pom was removed and fitted on another ship, being replaced by two quadruple 0.5-inch (13 mm) Vickers machine gun mounts.

The modifications were considered successful and plans for the conversion of the other eleven ships were drawn up. However, these conversions were delayed; the conversions of Cairo and Calcutta did not start until 1938. Instead of single 4 inch guns, they were to receive twin HA mounts, except that one mount was given over to a quadruple pom-pom. In mid-1939, Carlisle and Curacoa went in for their conversions, but the work ceased on the outbreak of war.

== Second World War service ==
The Caledon, Ceres and Carlisle-class ships served in the Second World War, despite their age.

Calypso caught the German blockade-runner Konsul Hendrik Fisser in 1939. That same year, Caradoc intercepted the German tanker Emmy Friedrich, whose crew subsequently scuttled her. A number of ships took part in the Norwegian campaign in 1940.

The C class were also extensively used in the Mediterranean Sea; the first notable engagement by a ship of the class being Coventry's participation in the Battle of Cape Spartivento in 1940.

In 1941, Calcutta and Carlisle took part in the Battle of Cape Matapan, in which a number of Italian warships were sunk. C-class cruisers also took part in the campaign and evacuation of Crete, coming up against heavy German opposition from the air. In 1942, Carlisle took part in the Second Battle of Sirte, and Cairo in the Battle of Pantelleria.

Colombo and Caledon went in for their refits in 1942–1943 – getting 40 mm Bofors and 20 mm Oerlikons alongside the twin mounts. In 1943, Carlisle was badly damaged by German aircraft, but did not sink. She became a base ship in Alexandria Harbour until 1945.

Capetown provided support to the Normandy Landings in 1944, bombarding German positions.

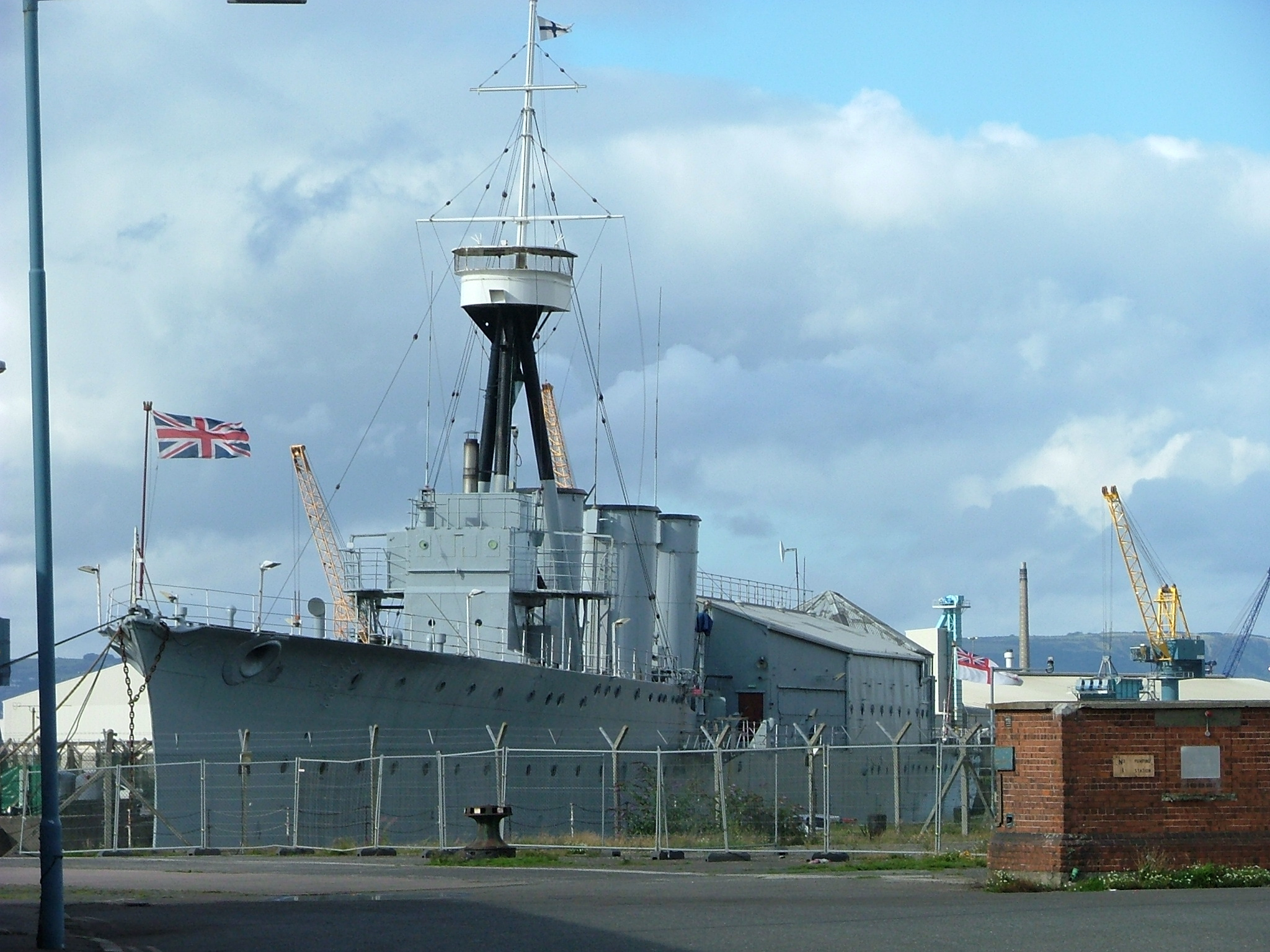
HMS Caroline sporting her three flags (From left to right) Union Flag, Commodore RNR's Rank flag, Flag of the Royal Navy (White Ensign)

Six ships of the C class were lost during the war:

- Curlew was sunk by German aircraft off Narvik during the Norwegian campaign on 26 May 1940.
- Calypso was sunk by the Italian submarine Alpino Bagnolini on 12 June 1940.
- Calcutta was attacked and sunk by German aircraft during the evacuation of Crete on 1 June 1941.
- Cairo was sunk on 12 August 1942 by the Axum during Operation Pedestal (the pivotal resupply of Malta).
- Coventry was badly damaged by German aircraft while covering a raid on Tobruk on 14 September 1942, forcing the destroyer HMS Zulu to scuttle her.
- Curacoa was sunk after colliding with the ocean liner RMS Queen Mary on 2 October 1942.

== The survivor ==
HMS Caroline remained the Royal Navy Volunteer Reserve drill ship in Alexandra Dock, Belfast until 31 March 2011, when she was decommissioned. Despite ongoing alterations throughout her lifetime, many parts of the ship still date to when she was originally commissioned in 1914. In 2016 she was opened to the public as a museum ship.

== See also ==
- List of ship classes of World War II
