= Alex Hankey =

American physicist (born 1947)

The Honourable Alex Hankey
- Born: 18 August 1947 (age 79)
- Education: Massachusetts Institute of Technology; Trinity College, Cambridge

Alexander Maurice Alers Hankey (born 18 August 1947), known as Alex Hankey, is a theoretical physicist from Boston University, trained at Massachusetts Institute of Technology and Cambridge University. He was a post-doctoral fellow at Stanford Linear Accelerator Center. Deeply interested in Vedanta, Yoga, and Ayurveda, he played a vital role in setting up Maharishi University of Management and later on became a professor at it, where he taught the first undergraduate course in philosophy of science. His current work relates to applying a combination of philosophical arguments and knowledge of Vedic sciences to solve the problems within modern science, thereby refining the foundations of physics, biology, and information theory.

== Education and career ==
Hankey was educated at Rugby School, Warwickshire, and at Trinity College, Cambridge, where he attained a first in Natural Sciences Tripos. Specializing in theoretical physics, he moved to MIT, to do a PhD under Nobel Laureate Steven Weinberg and Eugene Stanley in the area of critical phenomena. He obtained his PhD in 1972 from Boston University, and thereafter he authored/co-authored many papers on the same, which now have resurfaced as applications to criticality in biosystems.

Working as an assistant professor at the Maharishi International University, Hankey developed approaches to Ayurveda, Jyotish, Samkhya, Yoga and Vedanta. He then became visiting professor at Swami Vivekananda Yoga Anusandhana Samsthana, before becoming a distinguished professor in yoga and physical science there. He founded the Journal of Ayurveda and Integrative Medicine and is on the editorial boards of many leading journals in the field. He has published more than 60 papers in peer-reviewed scientific journals, and many expository articles for a general audience.

== Research and outreach ==
Taking inputs from Vedic sciences, Hankey tries to resolve problems in theoretical physics like the nature of the Hawking-Penrose singularity, "holistic" processes in physics and biology, the interpretation of quantum theory, the origins of thermodynamics, the implications of dispersion relations and analyticity. He has developed a new complexity-based theory of cognition, and a Vedic approach to understanding quantum theory with new extensions of that theory. Due to his diverse research interests, he has been a guest speaker at many international and national conferences, and has been featured in the news several times for promoting traditional knowledge, introducing preventative health programs in developed societies, etc.,

Hankey lives in Bangalore, India, where he guides PhD research on yoga, meditation, the mind-body connection, and electronic measurement of holistic aspects of organism function.

His primary student, Dr. Ameya Krishna B, is a scientist in Nanotechnology at the MESA+ Institute of Nanotechnology in Enschede, the Netherlands, and is the co-founder of Indus Healthcare in Bangalore, India. They together represented India at the Houses of Commons in the British Parliament in June 2019 and spoke about indigenous medical sciences, integrative medicine, and Yoga. They argued that natural systems of medicine and minimal use of chemical intervention could be a sustainable means to healthier populations, reducing the burden on National Health Systems.
