= HMS Valerian =

British Royal Navy sloop ship

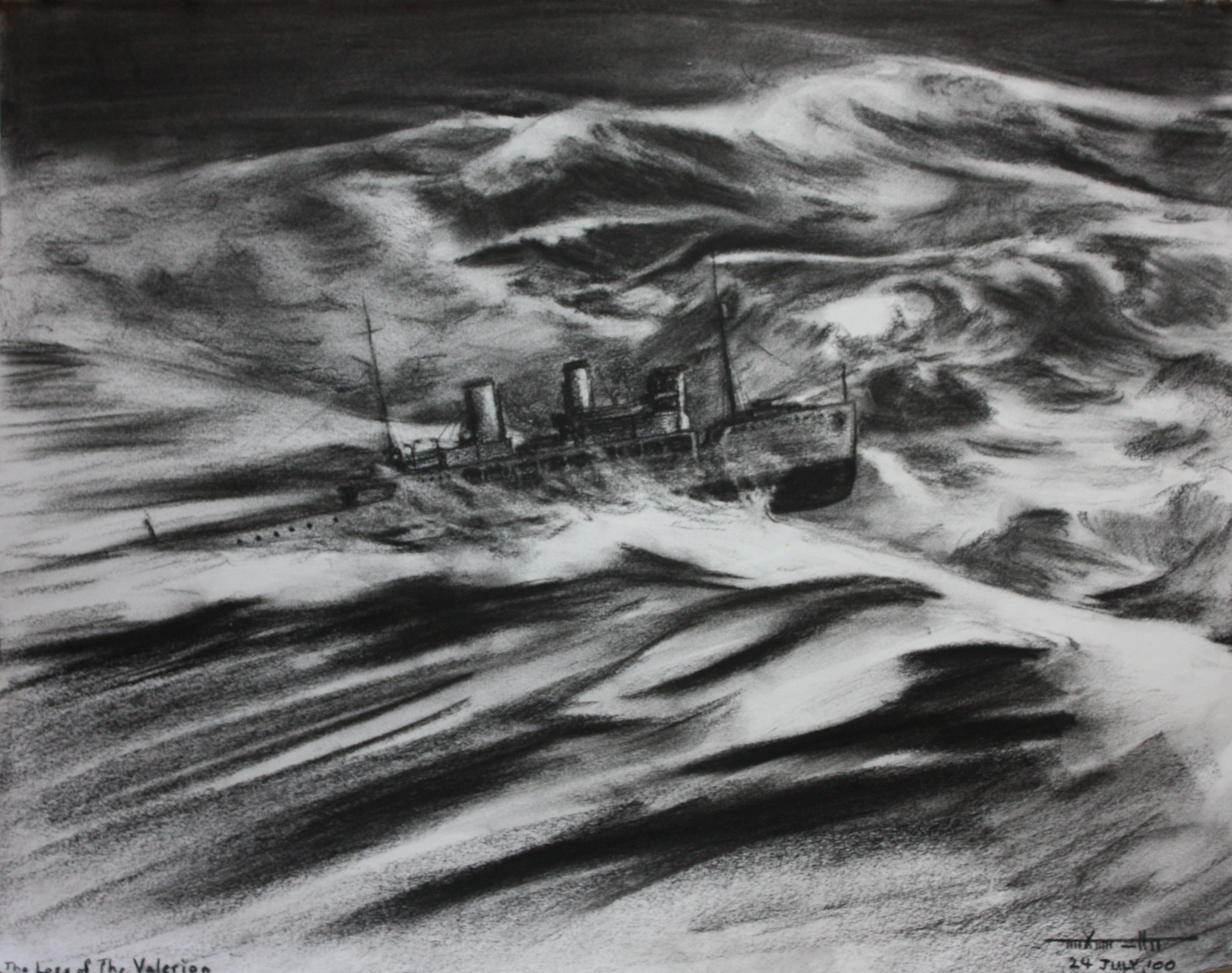
- Artist's impression of the loss of HMS Valerian

History

United Kingdom
- Name: HMS Valerian
- Namesake: Valeriana officinalis
- Builder: Charles Rennoldson and Company, South Shields
- Laid down: 1915
- Launched: 21 February 1916
- Home port: Royal Naval Dockyard, Bermuda
- Fate: Foundered off Bermuda in the 1926 Havana–Bermuda hurricane, on 22 October 1926

General characteristics
- Class & type: Arabis-class sloop
- Displacement: 1,200 tons
- Length: 255 ft 3 in (77.80 m) p/p; 267 ft 9 in (81.61 m) o/a
- Beam: 33 ft 6 in (10.21 m)
- Draught: 11 ft 9 in (3.58 m)
- Propulsion: 1 × 4-cylinder triple expansion engine; 2 × cylindrical boilers; 1 screw
- Speed: 17 knots (31 km/h; 20 mph)
- Range: 2,000 nmi (3,700 km; 2,300 mi) at 15 kn (28 km/h; 17 mph) with max. 260 tons of coal
- Complement: 104
- Armament: 2 x QF 4.7-inch Mk IV guns; 2 x 3-pounder (47 mm) AA; 2 x depth charge launchers

HMS Valerian was an Arabis-class sloop of the Royal Navy, built by Charles Rennoldson and Company, South Shields, and launched 21 February 1916. After service in the First World War, she foundered off Bermuda in the 1926 Havana–Bermuda hurricane, on 22 October 1926.

== History ==
After the commissioning, the Valerian completed security tasks off the British east coast, being used in 1917 and 1918 mainly to monitor coastal convoy routes and the mine barriers of the North Sea Mine Barrage. The sloop was not involved in combat operations, although it was briefly suspected that she had sunk the German submarine SM U-99 in the northern North Sea in July 1917. However, this submarine was sunk by the British submarine HMS J2.

Valerian recommissioned at Devonport on 29 December 1920 and was assigned with sister ship HMS Wistaria to the America and West Indies Station, based at the Royal Naval Dockyard in the Imperial fortress colony of Bermuda (HMD Bermuda) where she arrived on 2 April 1921,

On 21 October 1922, Valerian was damaged in a hurricane at Bermuda.

On Dominion Day, 1 July, 1924, Valerian crew members paraded at the Plains of Abraham, Quebec for the inauguration of the Cross of Sacrifice erected in remembrance of the Canadians lost in the First World War.

On 20 October 1925 she arrived at Baltimore to support Britain's Schneider Trophy team. The fastest British entry, the Supermarine S.4, crashed into the water on 23 October and Valerian assisted in the salvage. Valerian returned to Bermuda at the conclusion of racing.

== Loss ==
In 1926 HMS Valerian was returning to HM Dockyard Bermuda from providing hurricane relief in the Bahamas trailed by another hurricane. A shortage of coal in the Bahamas had forced her to put to sea with only enough to complete her journey, which meant that her mass, and hence her displacement, was a great deal less than would normally be the case, reducing her stability in rough seas. She last radioed after sighting Gibb's Hill Lighthouse early in the morning of 22 October 1926, at which time the crew saw no sign of an approaching storm. By the time she reached the Five Fathom Hole, she was being overtaken by the storm and conditions were too rough to risk the channel through the reefs. The crew were forced to turn southward to obtain sea room from the reefline lest they be driven on the rocks, and headed directly into the storm. She fought the storm for more than five hours, but after the eye passed overhead conditions became more dangerous with the wind more powerful and no longer coming from the same direction as the sea. As the ship's Captain, Commander William Arthur Usher, described at the Court Martial:

Just before 1300, a series of squalls struck the ship on the port side with a fury that beggars all description. The ship was thrown on her beam ends, heeling 70 degrees over to starboard. The helm was hard-a-port, to keep her head to sea, but this was evidently holding her over and on letting go the helm and putting it hard-a-starboard, the ship righted and came slowly up to the wind, wallowing heavily in the trough of the sea as she came round. It was at this moment the mainmast and wireless were carried away. The ship was brought within about 6 points of the wind, but these tremendous squalls kept forcing her over to leeward and it seemed only a matter of moments before the ship must go. Soon after the engines stopped and the report came up that the ship was ashore but this seems more than doubtful as nothing was felt on the bridge, and although the ship was in a mass of blinding spray, nothing in the nature of breakers was seen. At the time the engines stopped the ship was heeled over to about 60 and then went slowly over.

The ship sank with most of her crew going overboard without lifeboats or rafts. Men clung to floating wreckage. The Captain was one of 28 on or clinging to the same raft.

The N.W. wind felt bitterly cold to those parts which were exposed, Sunset came and as it grew dark we looked for Gibbs Hill Light or some other Light, as we had no idea of our position, but nothing was seen, not even the glare. The twelve hours of night, with waves breaking over us, were an experience never to be forgotten and many gave up during that time. They got slowly exhausted and filled up with water and then slipped away. The raft was slowly losing its buoyancy and as everyone wanted, as far as possible, to sit on the edge, it capsized about every 20 minutes, which was exhausting; we all swallowed water in the process and the effort of climbing back again began to tell. Twelve held out until the end, when H.M.S. "Capetown" was most thankfully sighted at about 1000 the following day.

In all, 85 of her crew were lost with the Valerian. When the centre of the storm passed over Bermuda the anemometer at the Royal Naval Dockyard measured 138 mph (222 km/h) at 13:00 UTC, before the wind destroyed it. This roughly coincided with the moment Valerian was overwhelmed.
