= Hubert Lynes =

British admiral (1874–1942)

Rear-Admiral Hubert Lynes CB CMG
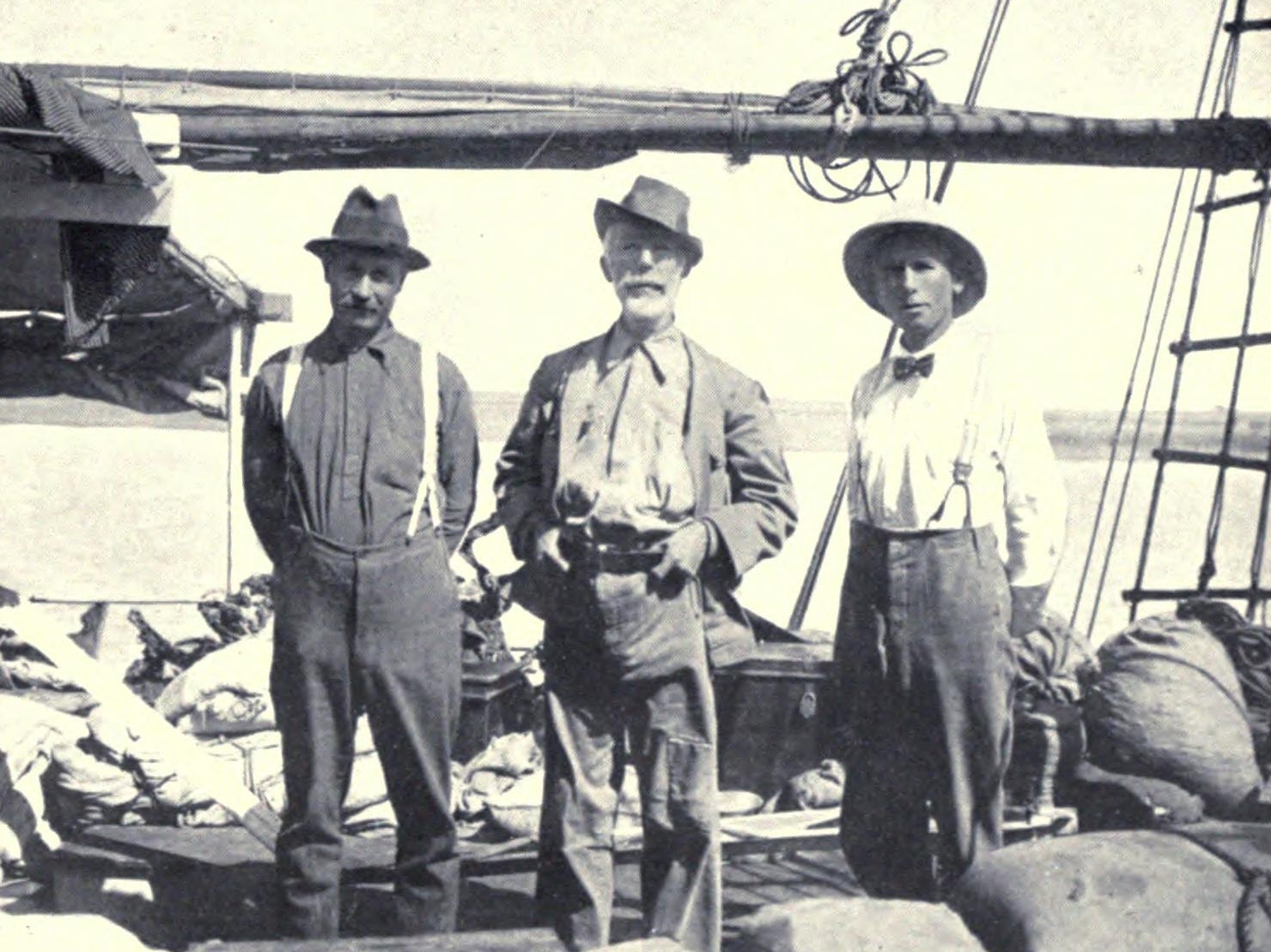
- Willoughby Prescott Lowe, Abel Chapman and Captain Lynes, 1913–14
- Born: 27 November 1874
- Died: 10 November 1942 (aged 67); Holyhead, Wales
- Military career
- Allegiance: United Kingdom
- Branch: Royal Navy
- Service years: 1888–1919; 1939–1941
- Rank: Rear-Admiral
- Commands: HMS Warspite (1918–19); HMS Penelope (1915–16); HMS Cadmus (1910–12); HMS Venus (1905–08); HMS Kite (1902–03)
- Conflicts: First World War; Zeebrugge Raid; Second Ostend Raid; Second World War
- Awards: Companion of the Order of the Bath; Companion of the Order of St Michael and St George; Commander of the Legion of Honour (France); Commander of the Order of Leopold (Belgium); Croix de Guerre (Belgium)

Rear-Admiral Hubert Lynes, CB, CMG (27 November 1874 – 10 November 1942) was a British admiral whose First World War service was notable for his direction of the Zeebrugge and Ostend raids designed to neutralise the German-held port of Bruges, which was used as a raiding base against the British coastline by Imperial German Navy surface and submarine raiders. Throughout his service life and during retirement, Lynes was a noted ornithologist who contributed to numerous books on the subject and was in his lifetime considered the leading expert on African birds.

== Naval career ==
Born on 27 November 1874, Hubert Lynes was given to a career at sea from a young age. He was educated at Stubbington House School, an establishment with strong connections to the navy, and enlisted in the Royal Navy aged 13 in 1888. He rose through the ranks and was a lieutenant when, in July 1902, he was appointed in command of the gunboat HMS Kite. In 1905 he was promoted to commander and placed in command of the small Eclipse-class cruiser HMS Venus in the Mediterranean. He commanded her until 1908, when he returned to England for a period ashore before taking command of the screw sloop HMS Cadmus on the China Station in 1910. Remaining on Cadmus until 1912, he was again returned to a shore station, where he remained until the outbreak of the First World War.

An experienced naval officer, Lynes was given command of the brand-new Arethusa-class cruiser HMS Penelope, which completed construction in early 1915 and served in the Atlantic for the next year. In 1916 whilst hunting German U-boats, Penelope was torpedoed and badly damaged by SM UB-19, forcing extensive repairs. This freed Lynes for a new post, that of second in command to Admiral Roger Keyes, a dynamic officer who was in charge of the Allied Naval and Marine Forces, a department of the Admiralty that planned and conducted raids and commando-style operations on German-held territory.

=== Zeebrugge and Ostend ===
The culmination of Keyes and Lynes' work in this office was the Zeebrugge Raid of April 1918 and the subsidiary raids at Ostend in April and May. The plan in these operations was to sink obsolete nineteenth century cruisers in the canals linking Zeebrugge and Ostend with the vital naval base at Bruges, thus bottling up the German force in the base and preventing its use by the U-boat fleet during their war on Allied commerce (Handelskrieg). The operations suffered heavy casualties amongst the attacking sailors and marines but did succeed in sinking the blockships and partially obstructing the canal, although the full effect of these attacks had been subject to debate ever since.

At the war's end, Lynes was present at the surrender of the German High Seas Fleet at Scapa Flow as Captain of the new and powerful battleship HMS Warspite. His war decorations included investiture as a Companion of the Order of the Bath and as a Companion of the Order of St Michael and St George, as well as being made a Commander of the Legion d'honneur by France, a Commander of the Order of Leopold and awarded Croix de Guerre by Belgium. In 1919, Lynes accepted retirement and left the sea, settling in the countryside with the rank of rear admiral.

== Ornithology ==
A highly experienced ornithologist, Lynes developed a boyhood interest in nature into a scientific study of birdlife during his time in the navy. Whilst in the Mediterranean during the first years of the twentieth century, Lynes made extensive notes on migratory patterns of European and African birds and made the first of twelve expeditions he would make to Africa to study its native birdlife. These observations were published in ornithological magazines The Ibis and British Birds and he was elected a member of the British Ornithologists' Union. He would continue to contribute to these journals throughout his life.

In 1910 whilst on home duty, Lynes participated in an expedition to the Pyrenees and whilst stationed in China made numerous observations of the birds of the region. These notes and collections were however all lost in the torpedoing of the Penelope in 1916. Upon retirement, Lynes travelled to the Darfur region of the Sudan, and made extensive observations of Bird life there, compiling a study which was published in 1930 in The Ibis as Review of the genus Cisticola. This work was well received and Lynes was awarded the Godman-Salvin Medal for his contributions to the study of African ornithology. In the same year he served as vice-president of the British Ornithiologists' Union and was made a correspondence member of the American Ornithologists' Union. He had also been made a fellow of the Royal Geographical Society and the Zoological Society of London.

In 1936 he made a further study of birds in Egypt, but two years later he contracted shingles in Sudan and was forced to return home with his health ruined. He never again travelled and entered a long convalescence from which he never fully recovered. At the outbreak of the Second World War in 1939, Lynes was posted as senior naval officer in North Wales, a light administrative post given his ill health, and one which he was nevertheless unable to sustain, retiring again in 1941. He continued writing on birds of the Sudan right up until his death, in November 1942 aged 67 at a naval hospital. He was buried under a Commonwealth War Graves Commission headstone in St. Seiriol Churchyard, Holyhead. His health had never recovered from his illness in Africa. He never married and lived his entire life with his maiden sister, who cared for him when not at sea.
