= HMS Cardiff (D58) =

C-class ship built for Royal Navy

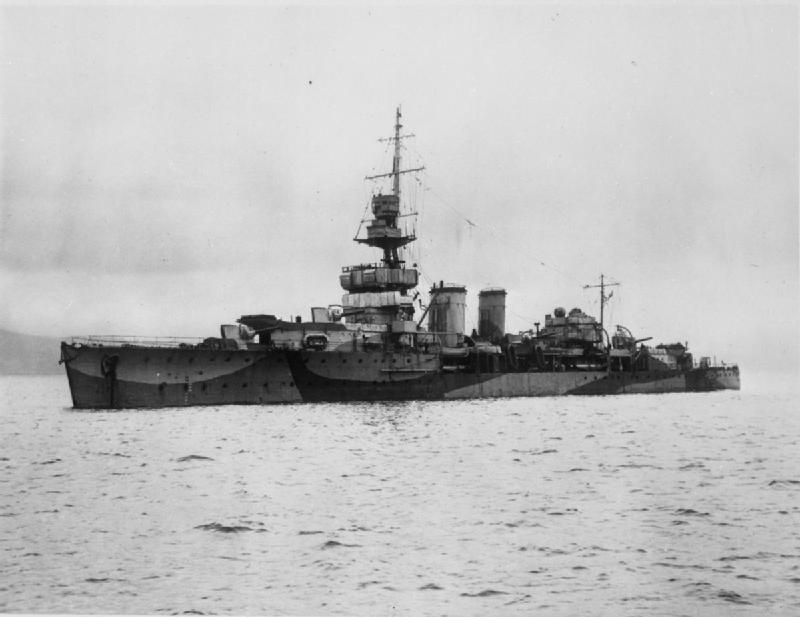
- In wartime camouflage, 1942

History

United Kingdom
- Name: Cardiff
- Namesake: Cardiff
- Ordered: March–April 1915
- Builder: Fairfield Shipbuilding and Engineering Company, Govan
- Laid down: 22 July 1916
- Launched: 12 April 1917
- Completed: 25 June 1917
- Decommissioned: 3 September 1945
- Out of service: Sold for scrap, 23 January 1946
- Identification: Pennant number: 29 (Jan 18); 39 (Apr 18); 58 (Nov 19); I.58 (1936); D.58 (1940)
- Fate: Broken up from 18 March 1946

General characteristics (as built)
- Class & type: C-class light cruiser
- Displacement: 4,190 long tons (4,260 t)
- Length: 450 ft 3 in (137.2 m) (o/a)
- Beam: 43 ft 5 in (13.2 m)
- Draught: 14 ft 8 in (4.5 m) (mean)
- Installed power: 40,000 shp (30,000 kW); 6 × Yarrow boilers
- Propulsion: 2 × shafts; 2 × geared steam turbines
- Speed: 29 kn (54 km/h; 33 mph)
- Complement: 460
- Armament: 5 × single BL 6 in (152 mm) Mk XII guns; 2 × single QF 3 in (76 mm) 20-cwt (Note: "Cwt" is the abbreviation for hundredweight, 20 cwt referring to the weight of the gun.) anti-aircraft guns; 4 × twin 21 in (533 mm) torpedo tubes
- Armour: Waterline belt: 1.25–3 in (32–76 mm); Deck: 1 in (25 mm); Conning tower: 3 in

HMS Cardiff was a C-class light cruiser built for the Royal Navy during World War I. She was one of the five ships of the Ceres sub-class and spent most of her career as a flagship. Assigned to the Grand Fleet during the war, the ship participated in the Second Battle of Heligoland Bight in late 1917. Cardiff was briefly deployed to the Baltic in late 1918 supporting anti-Bolshevik forces during the British campaign in the Baltic during the Russian Civil War.

She was then transferred to the Mediterranean Fleet in early 1919 and spent most of the rest of the year in the Adriatic Sea. In early 1920, the ship was in the Black Sea supporting the Whites against the Bolsheviks. Cardiff spent most of the rest of her time between the world wars overseas or in reserve. The ship played a minor role in World War II as she was initially assigned to the Northern Patrol, but became a training ship in late 1940 and continued in that role for the rest of the war. Cardiff was sold for scrap in early 1946 and subsequently broken up.

== Design and description ==
The C-class cruisers were intended to escort the fleet and defend it against enemy destroyers attempting to close within torpedo range. The Ceres sub-class was a slightly larger and improved version of the preceding Caledon sub-class. The ships were 450 feet 3 inches (137.2 m) long overall, with a beam of 43 feet 5 inches (13.2 m) and a mean draught of 14 feet 8 inches (4.5 m). Displacement was 4,190 long tons (4,260 t) at normal and 5,020 long tons (5,100 t) at deep load. Cardiff was powered by two geared Parsons steam turbines, each driving one propeller shaft, which produced a total of 40,000 shaft horsepower (30,000 kW). The turbines used steam generated by six Yarrow boilers which gave her a speed of about 29 knots (54 km/h; 33 mph). She carried 935 long tons (950 t) tons of fuel oil. The ship had a crew of about 460 officers and ratings.

The main armament of the Ceres-class ships consisted of five BL 6-inch (152 mm) Mk XII guns that were mounted on the centreline. While identical in number to the Caledons, the layout was considerably improved by moving the gun formerly between the bridge and fore funnel to a superfiring position over the forward gun with wider firing arc than in its old position, one was aft of the rear funnel, and the last two were in the stern, with one gun superfiring over the rearmost gun. The two QF 3-inch (76 mm) 20-cwt anti-aircraft (AA) guns were positioned abreast the fore funnel. The torpedo armament of the Ceres's was identical to that of the Caledons, with eight 21 in (533 mm) torpedo tubes in four twin mounts, two on each broadside. The Ceres class was protected by a waterline belt: 1.5–3 in (38–76 mm) thick and had a protective deck that was 1 in (25 mm) thick over the steering gear. The walls of the conning tower had a thickness of 3 inches.

== Construction and career ==
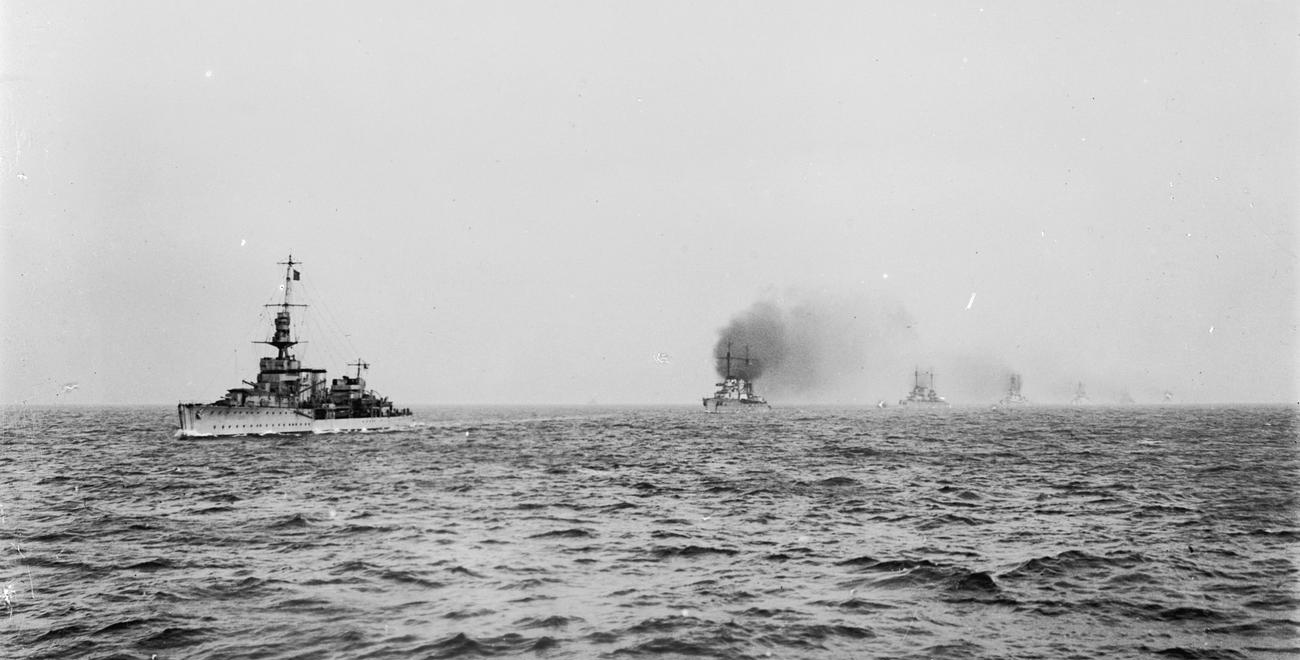
Cardiff leading surrendered German battlecruisers into the Firth of Forth at the end of World War I

Cardiff, the second ship of her name to serve in the Royal Navy, was ordered in March–April 1916 as part of the Repeat War Programme. The ship was laid down by Fairfield Shipbuilding and Engineering Company at their Govan shipyard on 22 July 1916. She was launched on 12 April 1917 and completed on 25 June 1917. She became flagship of the 6th Light Cruiser Squadron of the Grand Fleet the following month. Cardiff participated in the Second Battle of Heligoland Bight on 17 November 1917. This was a successful attempt by the British to intercept German minesweeping forces that were clearing British minefields in the North Sea. The 6th LCS screened the two light Courageous-class battlecruisers of the 1st Cruiser Squadron during the battle together with the 1st Light Cruiser Squadron. The British lost the German minesweepers in the smoke screen laid by the four German light cruisers and pursued the latter ships for most of the battle, although they inflicted little damage in the poor visibility caused by the German smoke. Cardiff fired the most of any ship in her squadron, but did not hit any German ships. She was, however, hit four or five times herself, killing seven crewmen and wounding thirteen, but was only lightly damaged. Based at Scapa Flow and Rosyth during 1918, the ship spent the remainder of the war escorting convoys and training in the northern portion of the North Sea. By 21 November 1918 the war was over, and Cardiff had the honour of leading the German High Seas Fleet to the Firth of Forth to be interned.

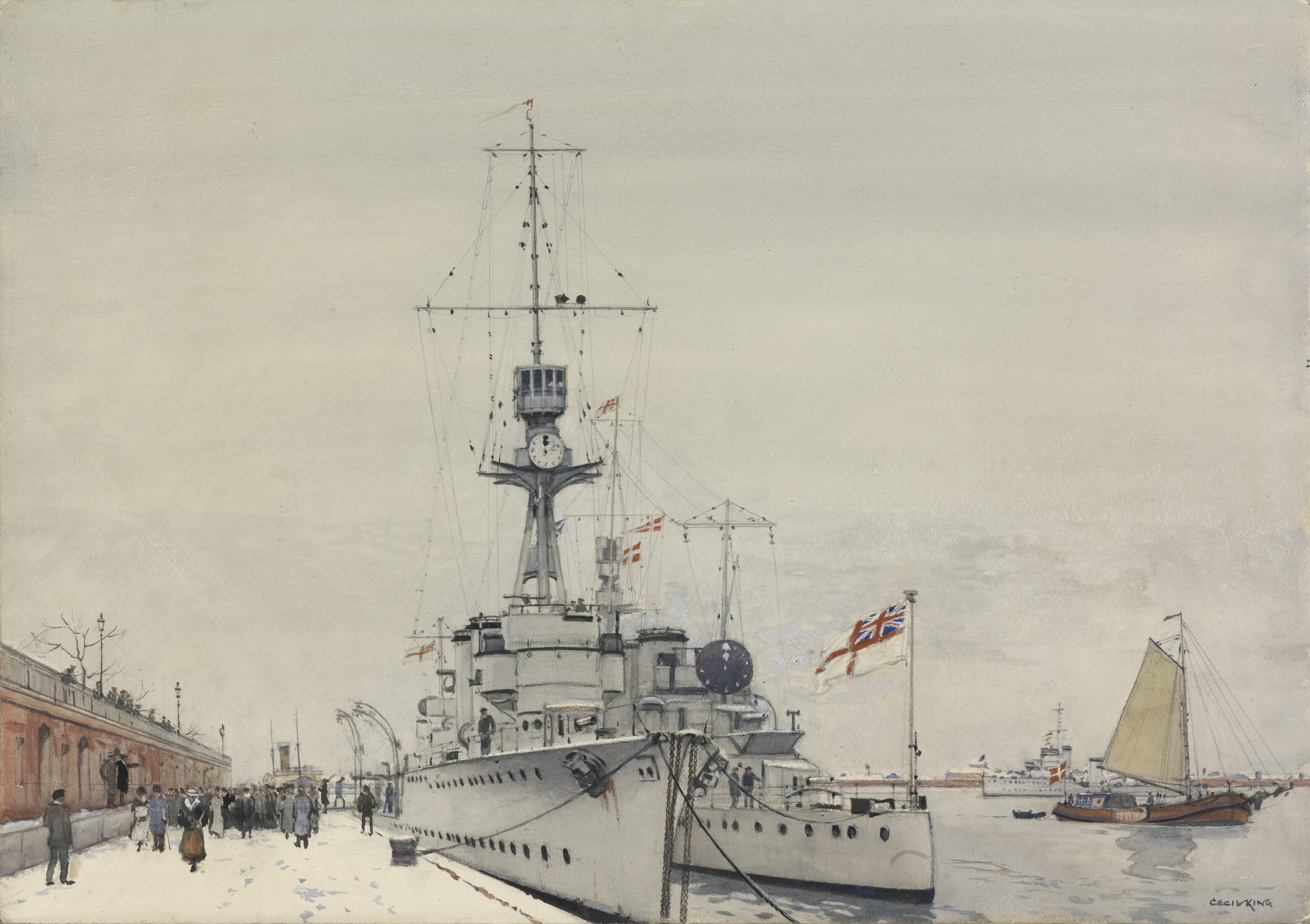
A painting by Cecil King of HMS Concord (left) and HMS Cardiff (right) in Copenhagen, Denmark, December 1918

A few days later, the 6th LCS, under the command of Rear-Admiral Edwyn Alexander-Sinclair, was ordered to the Baltic Sea to support the Baltic States as they attempted to secure their independence from Russia. Together with her half-sister Caradoc and five destroyers, the ship bombarded Bolshevik positions east of Reval (Tallinn), Estonia, on 14 December and brought the Russian offensive to a halt after they destroyed the one bridge connecting them with Petrograd (Saint Petersburg), Russia. The next day, her starboard AA gun was dismounted and given to the Estonians. The 6th LCS was recalled in early January 1919 and arrived back in Rosyth on 10 January.

Cardiff arrived at Portsmouth on 11 January to begin a refit that lasted until 27 February. Her conning tower may have been removed at this time and the bridge enlarged. On 10 March, she sailed for Malta to join her squadron, which had been renumbered as the 3rd Light Cruiser Squadron (3rd LCS) and assigned to the Mediterranean Fleet while the ship was refitting, where she arrived on six days later. The squadron was assigned peacekeeping duties in the Adriatic for most of 1919 and Cardiff spent the time visiting various Adriatic ports or in Malta. She became the flagship of Rear-Admiral George Hope on 1 September.

By 30 January 1920, the ship was in Constantinople and Cardiff arrived at Odessa on 4 February and Admiral Hope concurred in the decision to evacuate the city in the face of the advancing Bolsheviks. The ship departed the city the next day, but returned on 11 February and Hope assumed command of all British forces in the city. By late March, the ship was stationed in the Crimea until the Whites were forced to evacuate in November. On 6 November, Cardiff picked up Charles I of Austria, the last Emperor of Austria and King of Hungary, and his wife, Zita at Sulina, Romania, and conveyed them to their exile in the Portuguese island of Madeira, where they arrived on 19 November. The ship was present during the Great Fire of Smyrna almost a year later in mid-September 1922, close to the end of the Greco-Turkish War of 1919–1922. She remained in the Mediterranean until 1929 when she went home for a lengthy refit. During Cardiff's time in the Mediterranean, she was fitted with a pair of 2-pounder (40 mm) Mk II "pom-pom" AA guns in 1923–24 and her original 9-foot (2.7 m) rangefinders was exchanged for 12-foot (3.7 m) models during the mid-1920s. From 1931 to May 1933, she was assigned to the Commander-in-Chief, Africa as the flagship of the 6th Cruiser Squadron. The ship returned home that month and replaced her half-sister Cambrian as flagship of the Nore Reserve in July. The following year, she was transferred to the Chatham Reserve as their flagship and participated in the Silver Jubilee Fleet review for King George V on 16 July 1935. Cardiff was also present for the Coronation Fleet Review for King George VI on 20 May 1937. The ship was considered for conversion into an anti-aircraft cruiser in June 1938, but programme delays caused the conversion to be pushed back. A month later, Cardiff was recommissioned for service with the 5th Cruiser Squadron on the China Station. The ship departed Hong Kong on 29 April 1939 for the UK where she was again placed in reserve.

=== Second World War ===
On the first day of the war on 3 September 1939, Cardiff was assigned to the 12th Cruiser Squadron which was fruitlessly searching for returning German merchant ships in the North and Norwegian Seas. Several days later, she was assigned to patrol the gaps between the Shetland and Faeroe Islands and between the Faeroes and Iceland as part of the Northern Patrol. In late November, she fruitlessly searched for the German battleships Gneisenau and Scharnhorst after they sank the armed merchant cruiser, Rawalpindi, on the 23rd. On 12 June, Cardiff was tasked to suppress the German artillery batteries overlooking Saint-Valery-en-Caux to prevent them from firing on British ships as they evacuated the troops there, but they were no longer visible from the sea when the ship arrived. The cruiser received six wounded men from the coaster Cameo and returned to Portsmouth. Cardiff was converted for use as a gunnery training ship in October and served in that capacity for the rest of the war. The ship was fitted with six 20-millimeter (0.8 in) Oerlikon light AA guns and a Type 290 surface-search radar by April 1942. By late 1943 a Type 273 long-range search radar had also been fitted. Cardiff was paid off on 3 September 1945 and sold for scrap to Arnott Young on 23 January 1946. The ship was broken up in Dalmuir, Scotland, after she arrived there on 18 March.

== Bibliography ==
- Colledge, J. J.; Warlow, Ben (2006) [1969]. Ships of the Royal Navy: The Complete Record of All Fighting Ships of the Royal Navy from the 15th Century to the Present (3rd Rev ed.). London: Chatham Publishing. ISBN 978-1-86176-281-8. OCLC 67375475.
- Friedman, Norman (2010). British Cruisers: Two World Wars and After. Seaforth. ISBN 978-1-59114-078-8.
- Halpern, Paul, ed. (2011). The Mediterranean Fleet 1920–1929. Navy Records Society Publications. Vol. 158. Ashgate. ISBN 978-1-4094-2756-8.
- Head, Michael (2009). "The Baltic Campaign, 1918–1920, Pt. I". Warship International. XLVI (2): 135–50. ISSN 0043-0374.
- McBride, Keith (1990). "The Weird Sisters". In Gardiner, Robert (ed.). Warship. Vol. 1990. Naval Institute Press. pp. 102–117. ISBN 1-55750-903-4.
- Newbolt, Henry (1996) [1931]. Naval Operations. History of the Great War Based on Official Documents. Vol. V. Battery Press. ISBN 0-89839-255-1.
- Preston, Antony (1985). "Great Britain and Empire Forces". In Gray, Randal (ed.). Conway's All the World's Fighting Ships 1906–1921. Naval Institute Press. pp. 1–104. ISBN 0-85177-245-5.
- Raven, Alan & Roberts, John (1980). British Cruisers of World War Two. Naval Institute Press. ISBN 0-87021-922-7.
- Rohwer, Jürgen (2005). Chronology of the War at Sea 1939–1945: The Naval History of World War Two (Third Revised ed.). Naval Institute Press. ISBN 1-59114-119-2.
- "Transcript: HMS CARDIFF – January 1918 to December 1919, Grand Fleet including German Fleet surrender, Baltic, Mediterranean Fleet". Royal Navy Log Books of the World War 1 Era. Naval-History.net.
- Whitley, M. J. (1995). Cruisers of World War Two: An International Encyclopedia. Cassell. ISBN 1-86019-874-0.
- Winser, John de S. (1999). B.E.F. Ships Before, At and After Dunkirk. World Ship Society. ISBN 0-905617-91-6.
