= HMS Concord (1916) =

Royal Navy C-class light cruiser

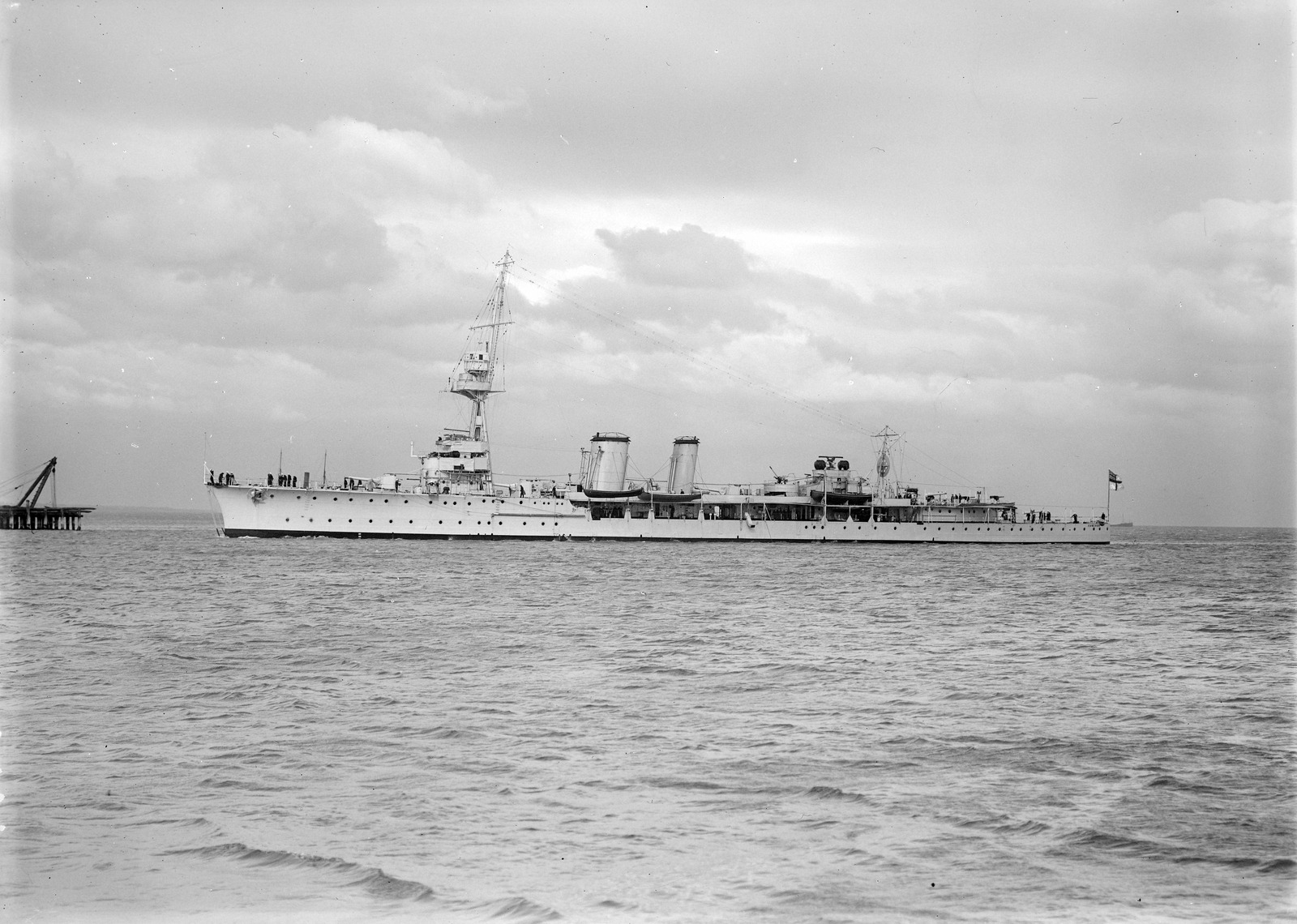
- Concord in 1929

History

United Kingdom
- Name: Concord
- Builder: Vickers Limited
- Laid down: 1 February 1915
- Launched: 1 April 1916
- Completed: December 1916
- Commissioned: December 1916
- Decommissioned: July 1923
- Recommissioned: May 1924
- Decommissioned: October 1927
- Recommissioned: 1928
- Decommissioned: January 1933
- Identification: Pennant number: 2A (Sep 15); 46 (Jan 18; 15 (Apr 18); 62 (Nov 19)
- Fate: Sold for scrap, August 1935

General characteristics
- Class & type: C-class light cruiser
- Displacement: 3,750 long tons (3,810 t)
- Length: 446 ft (136 m)
- Beam: 42 ft (13 m)
- Draught: 14.6 ft (4.5 m)
- Installed power: 8 Yarrow boilers; 40,000 shp (30,000 kW)
- Propulsion: 4 shafts; geared steam turbines
- Speed: 28.5 knots (52.8 km/h; 32.8 mph)
- Complement: 329-336
- Armament: 5 × single 6 in (152 mm) guns; 2 × single 3 in (76 mm) guns; 2 × single 2 pdr (40 mm (1.6 in)) AA guns; 2 × 21 in (533 mm) torpedo tubes
- Armour: 3 inch side (amidships); 2¼-1¼ inch side (bows); 2-2½ inch side (stern); 1 inch upper decks (amidships); 1 inch deck over rudder

HMS Concord was a C-class light cruiser of the Royal Navy that saw service during the First World War. She was part of the Centaur group of the C class.

On 25 December 1918 Ignacy Jan Paderewski, Polish pianist and composer, a member of the Polish National Committee re-organising Polish state after 123 years of partitions, arrived at Gdańsk (Danzig) on board HMS Concord on his way to Poznań and Warsaw. He formed the first Cabinet of the re-born Poland which on 26 January 1919 organised the first elections.

== Construction ==
The Ottoman Empire had ordered a pair of scout cruisers in 1914. When the First World War started, construction was halted. A considerable amount of material had already been prepared, and much of this was used in the construction of HMS Concord and her sister HMS Centaur. Built by Vickers Limited, Concord was laid down in February 1915 and launched on 1 April 1916.

== Service history ==
=== World War I ===
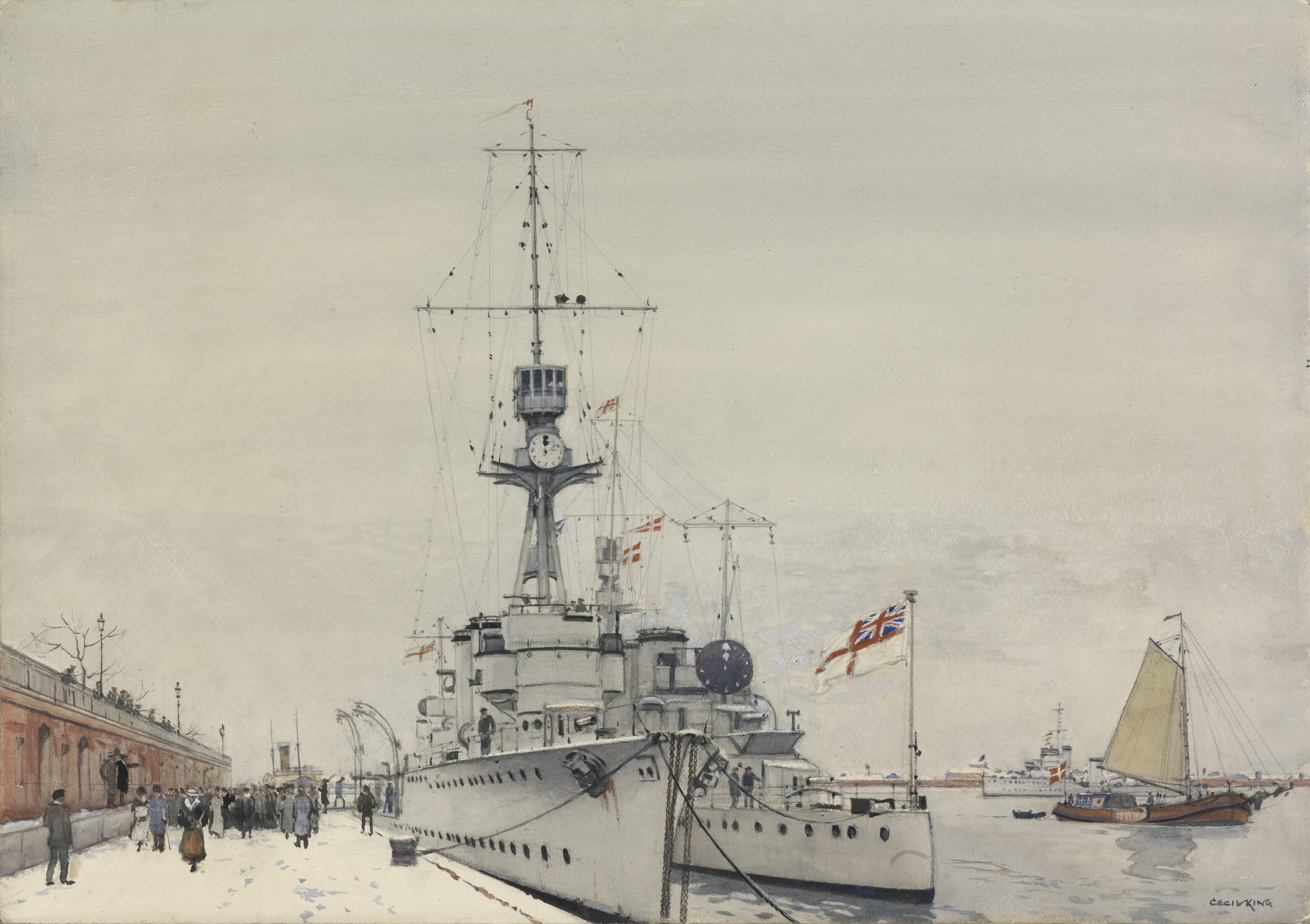
Concord and her sister ship, Cardiff, in Copenhagen in December 1918.

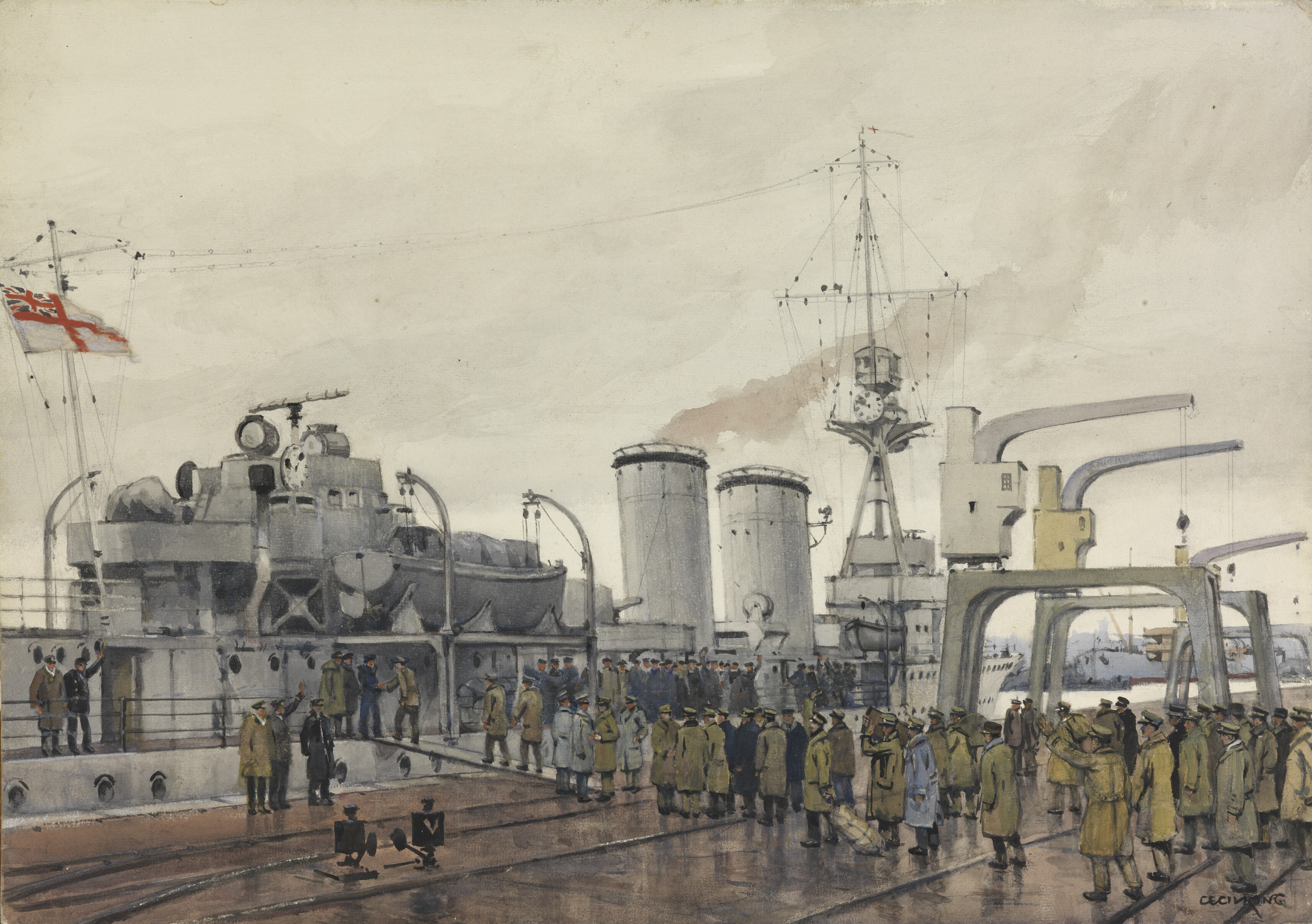
Liberated UK prisoners of war boarding Concord in Stettin on New Year's Day 1919

Upon being commissioned into the Royal Navy in December 1916, Concord was assigned to the 5th Light Cruiser Squadron, which operated as part of Harwich Force in the North Sea to defend the eastern approaches to the Strait of Dover and English Channel. She remained in the squadron through the end of the war in November 1918 and until March 1919. After the Armistice she visited the Baltic, where her duties included a courtesy visit with Cardiff to Copenhagen in December 1918, and liberating British prisoners of war from Danzig on 25 December 1918 and from Stettin on 1 January 1919.

=== Postwar ===
Concord recommissioned in October 1919 at Devonport for service in the 3rd Light Cruiser Squadron in the Mediterranean Fleet, recommissioning in August 1921 to continue this duty until July 1923, when she was decommissioned.

After undergoing a refit at Devonport, Concord recommissioned in May 1924 to return to the Mediterranean Fleet for more duty with the 3rd Light Cruiser Squadron. In 1925 she was attached to the Australian Station (where she replaced HMAS Brisbane), then from 1925 to 1926 to the China Station. She returned to the 3rd Light Cruiser Squadron in the Mediterranean in 1926, remaining in service there until decommissioned, transferred to the Reserve Fleet, and placed in reserve at Portsmouth in October 1927. She returned to service to transport troops to China in February 1928, and from October to November 1928 underwent a refit. She then was assigned to the Signals School at Portsmouth, remaining in service there until January 1933. After the death of the exiled King Manuel II of Portugal, she transported his coffin to Lisbon, Portugal, on 2 August 1932.

Concord was decommissioned in January 1933 and placed under dockyard control.

== Disposal ==
Concord was placed on the sale list in November 1934 and was sold in August 1935 for scrapping. She arrived at the yards of Metal Industries of Rosyth, Scotland, on 16 September 1935 to be broken up.
