= HMS Centaur (1916) =

Royal Navy C-class light cruiser

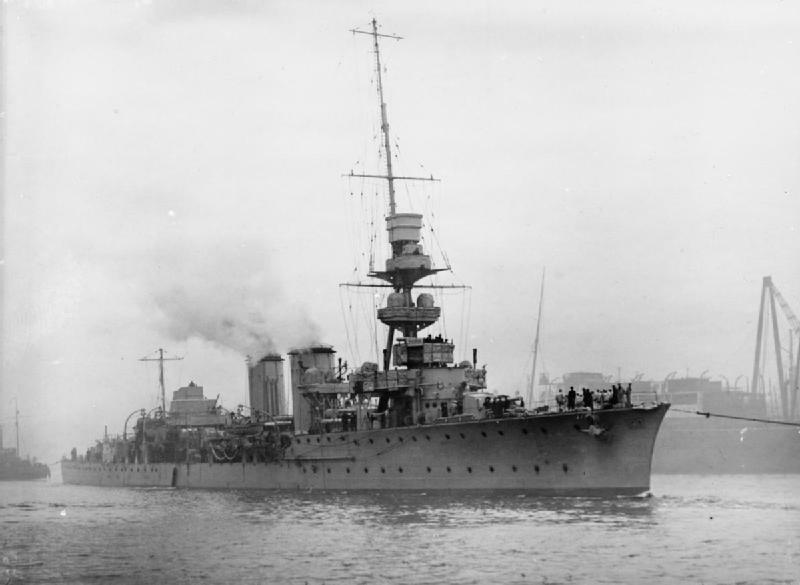
- Centaur sometime between 1916 and 1919

History

United Kingdom
- Name: Centaur
- Namesake: centaur
- Builder: Vickers Limited
- Laid down: 24 January 1915
- Launched: 6 January 1916
- Completed: August 1916
- Commissioned: August 1916
- Decommissioned: October 1923
- Recommissioned: 8 April 1925
- Decommissioned: March 1932
- Identification: Pennant number: 36 (Sep 15); 34 (Jan 18); 10 (Apr 18); 63 (Nov 19)
- Fate: Sold for scrap, February 1934

General characteristics
- Class & type: C-class light cruiser
- Displacement: 3,750 long tons (3,810 t)
- Length: 446 ft (136 m)
- Beam: 42 ft (13 m)
- Draught: 14.6 ft (4.5 m)
- Installed power: 8 Yarrow boilers; 40,000 shp (30,000 kW)
- Propulsion: 4 shafts; 2 geared steam turbines
- Speed: 28.5 knots (52.8 km/h; 32.8 mph)
- Range: carried 300 tons (824 tons maximum) of fuel oil
- Complement: 329–336
- Armament: 5 × 6 in (152 mm) guns; 2 × 3 in (76 mm) guns; 2 × 2 pdr (40 mm (1.6 in)) AA guns; 2 × 21 in (533 mm) torpedo tubes
- Armour: 3 inch side (amidships); 2¼-1¼ inch side (bows); 2-2½ inch side (stern); 1 inch upper decks (amidships); 1 inch deck over rudder

HMS Centaur was a C-class light cruiser of the Royal Navy that served in the First World War and the Russian Civil War. She was the name ship of the Centaur group of the C-class of cruisers.

== Construction ==
The Ottoman Empire had ordered a pair of scout cruisers in 1914. When the First World War started, construction was halted. A considerable amount of material had already been prepared, and much of this was used in the construction of HMS Centaur and her sister HMS Concord. Built by Vickers Limited, Centaur was laid down in January 1915 and launched on 1 January 1916.

== Service history ==
=== World War I ===
Upon being commissioned into the Royal Navy in August 1916, Centaur was assigned to the 5th Light Cruiser Squadron, which operated as a part of Harwich Force in the North Sea to defend the eastern approaches to the Strait of Dover and English Channel. On 5 June 1917 she and the light cruisers HMS Canterbury and HMS Conquest sank the German torpedo boat S20 in the North Sea near the Schouwen Bank off Zeebrugge, Belgium. On 13 June 1918 she struck a mine and had to undergo repairs at Hull.

=== Postwar ===
After the First World War, Centaur was sent to the Baltic Sea in December 1918 to take part in the British campaign there against Bolshevik and German forces during the Russian Civil War. In March 1919, she was reassigned from Harwich Force to the 3rd Light Cruiser Squadron in the Mediterranean Fleet, recommissioning at Malta in June 1920 and Gibraltar in October 1922 to continue that service.

In October 1923, Centaur was decommissioned, transferred to the Reserve Fleet, and placed in reserve at Devonport Dockyard. After undergoing a refit in 1924 and 1925, she was recommissioned at Portsmouth on 8 April 1925 to serve as the flagship of Commodore (D) – the officer in command of all destroyers – in the Atlantic Fleet, recommissioning in February 1928 and September 1930 to continue in this role. She was decommissioned again in March 1932 and placed in reserve at Portsmouth.

== Disposal ==
Centaur was placed on the sale list in 1933 and sold in February 1934 to King, of Troon, Scotland, for scrapping. She arrived at their yards on 6 March 1934 to be scrapped.
