= 4th Light Cruiser Squadron =

- Active: 1915–1919
- Country: United Kingdom
- Allegiance: British Empire
- Branch: Royal Navy
- Engagements: Battle of Jutland

The 4th Light Cruiser Squadron was a naval formation of Light cruisers of the Royal Navy from 1915 to 1919.

== History ==
=== World War One ===
Formed on 15 May 1915 it was then assigned to the Grand Fleet in August 1915 and remained attached the fleet until November 1918.

At the Battle of Jutland, the 4th Light Cruiser Squadron consisted of four C-Class cruisers HMS Calliope, Constance, Caroline and Comus plus the Arethusa class cruiser HMS Royalist. At Jutland, HMS Calliope flew the broad pennant as Commodore Le Mesurier's flagship. The 4th Light Cruiser Squadron was initially deployed as an anti-submarine screen directly ahead of the main British battle fleet, with HMS Calliope in the lead followed, in order, by Constance, Comus, Royalist and Caroline. Shortly after 8:05p.m. 31 May, the First Division of the 4th Light Cruiser Squadron (Calliope, Constance and Comus), engaged with German destroyers and then sighted the main German battle fleet at which Calliope launched a torpedo before retiring under heavy German fire.

=== Interwar ===
In 1919 the squadron was assigned to the East Indies Station.

== Commodores/Rear-Admirals commanding ==
Post holders included:

	Rank	Flag	Name	Term
Commodore/Rear-Admiral Commanding, 4th Light Cruiser Squadron
1	Commodore		Charles Le Mesurier	May 1915-August 1917
2	Commodore		Rudolph Bentinck	August 1917-October 1918
3	Rear-Admiral	Rear-Admiral - Royal Navy	Allan Everett	November 1918-April 1919
