= HMS Aurora (1913) =

Arethusa-class light cruiser

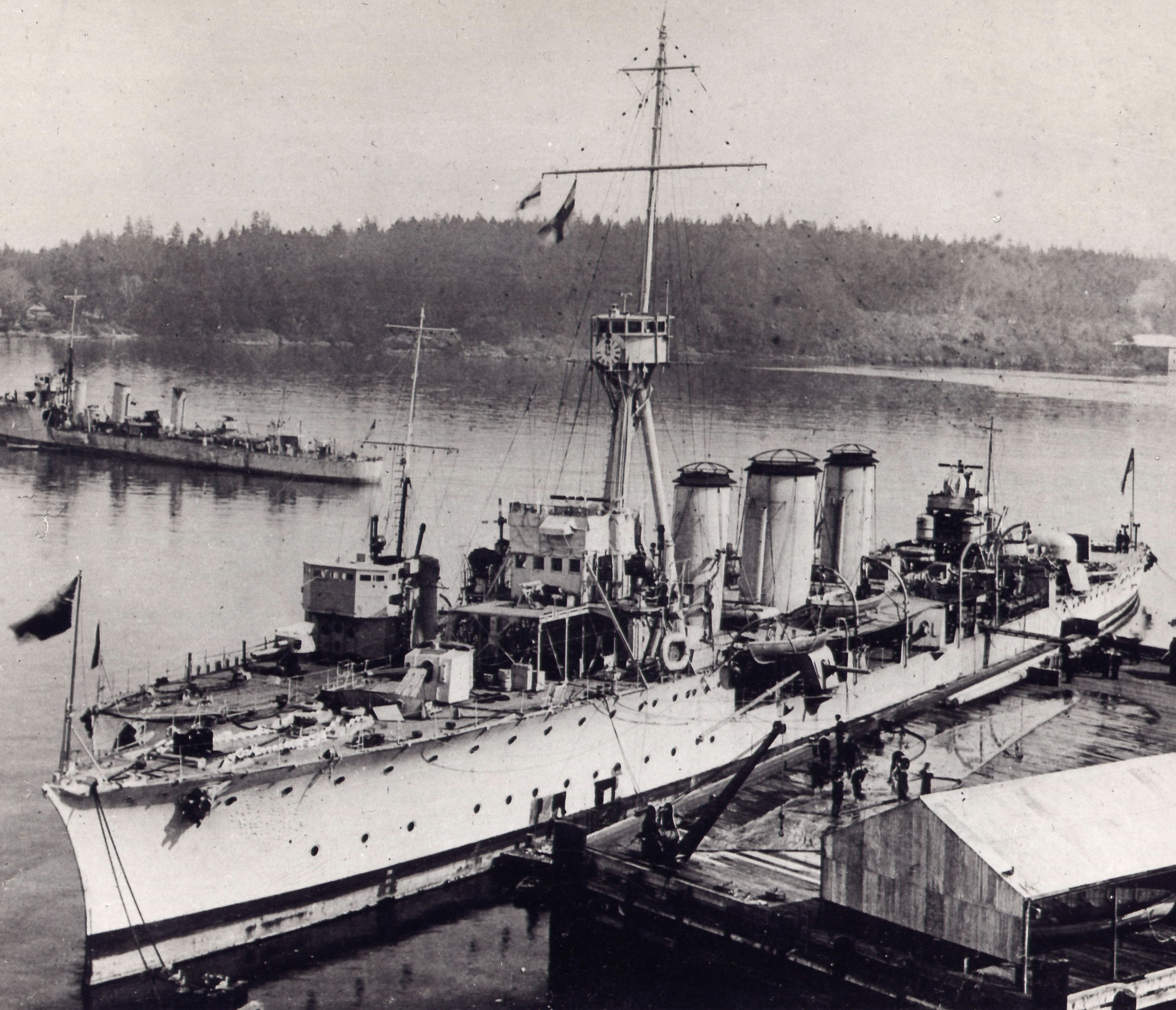
- HMCS Aurora in 1921

History

United Kingdom
- Name: Aurora
- Builder: Devonport Dockyard
- Laid down: 24 October 1912
- Launched: 30 September 1913
- Commissioned: September 1914
- Decommissioned: 1918
- Identification: Pennant number: C1 (1914); 08 (Jan 18); 66 (Nov 19)
- Fate: Sold to Canada, 1920

Canada
- Name: Aurora
- Acquired: 25 March 1920
- Commissioned: 1 November 1920
- Decommissioned: 1 July 1922
- Fate: Sold for scrap, August 1927

General characteristics
- Class & type: Arethusa-class light cruiser
- Displacement: 3,512 long tons (3,568 t)
- Length: 436 ft (132.9 m) (o/a)
- Beam: 39 ft (11.9 m)
- Draught: 15 ft 7 in (4.75 m) (mean, deep load)
- Installed power: 8 × Yarrow boilers; 40,000 shp (30,000 kW)
- Propulsion: 4 × shafts; 4 × steam turbines
- Speed: 28.5 kn (52.8 km/h; 32.8 mph)
- Complement: 270
- Armament: 2 × single 6 in (152 mm) guns; 6 × single 4 in (102 mm) guns; 1 × single 3-pdr (47 mm (1.9 in)) AA gun; 2 × twin 21 in (533 mm) torpedo tubes
- Armour: Waterline belt: 1–3 in (25–76 mm); Deck: 1 in (25 mm)

HMS Aurora was an Arethusa-class light cruiser that saw service in World War I with the Royal Navy. During the war, the cruiser participated in the Battle of Dogger Bank and was a member of the Grand Fleet when the main fleet of the Imperial German Navy surrendered to it in 1918. Following the war, Aurora was placed in reserve and in 1920, the cruiser was transferred to the Royal Canadian Navy. Her service with the Royal Canadian Navy was brief, being paid off in 1922. The cruiser was sold for scrap in 1927 and broken up.

== Design and description ==
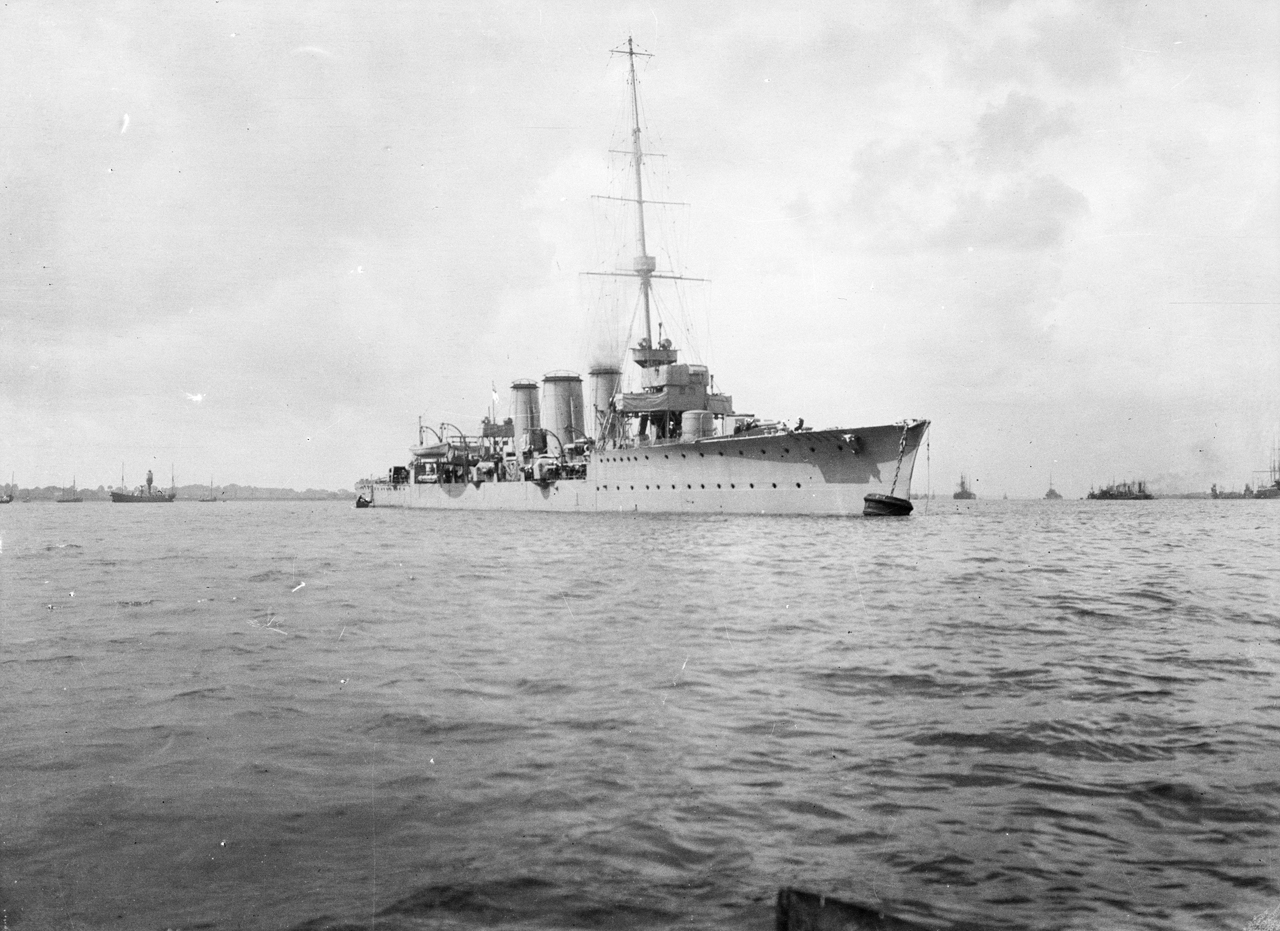
The light cruiser HMS Aurora at moorings, Harwich

Designed to augment the destroyer flotillas of the fleet, the Aurora-class cruisers displaced 3,750 long tons (3,810 t) normal and 4,400 long tons (4,500 t) at deep load. They were 436 feet (133 m) long overall with a beam of 39 feet (12 m) and a mean draught of 13 feet 5 inches (4.09 m). The cruisers were propelled by four shafts driven by Parsons turbines powered by steam from eight boilers creating 40,000 shaft horsepower (30,000 kW). This gave the ships a maximum speed of 28 1/2 knots (52.8 km/h; 32.8 mph). The cruisers carried 875 long tons (889 t) of fuel oil.

Aurora had an armoured belt of 3 inches (76 mm) that tapered to 1 inch (25.4 mm). The cruiser also had an armoured deck of 1 inch (25.40 mm). The cruiser was armed with two breech-loading (BL) 6-inch (152 mm)/45 calibre Mk XII guns and six quick-firing (QF) 4-inch (102 mm)/45 calibre Mk IV guns. For secondary armament the cruiser sported a single 3-pounder 1.9 in (47 mm) gun for anti-aircraft purposes and four 21-inch (533 mm) torpedo tubes in two twin mounts. The class had a maximum complement of 282.

== Service history ==
=== Royal Navy ===
The cruiser's keel was laid down at Devonport Dockyard on 24 October 1912 and Aurora was launched on 30 September 1913. The ship was commissioned into the Royal Navy in September 1914.

Aurora saw service as part of Harwich Force from September 1914 to February 1915, as leader of the 1st Destroyer Flotilla. Based at Harwich under the command of Commodore Reginald Tyrwhitt, the unit was ordered to sea on 14 December 1914 as part of the force sent to intercept a German fleet under Admiral Franz von Hipper raiding towns on the east coast of England. However, the flotilla was prevented from intervening in the resulting engagement due to poor weather and returned to Yarmouth.

In January 1915, German command ordered a reconnaissance mission of the Dogger Bank by Hipper. At his disposal were three battlecruisers, one armoured cruiser, four light cruisers and nineteen destroyers. The message ordering the German mission was intercepted by the Admiralty and Tyrwhitt's force was among the units deployed for the coming battle. Tyrwhitt's force began to depart Harwich at 5:30 pm on 23 January. Aurora was among the ships that had departed after their commander and when Tyrwhitt met with Admiral David Beatty's force the next morning, Aurora and the majority of Tyrwhitt's force was 12 nautical miles (22 km; 14 mi) astern. However, Aurora and the majority of Tyrwhitt's force encountered Hipper's fleet at 7:05 am on 24 January, with the cruiser spotting a three-funneled cruiser and four destroyers on the horizon. Aurora closed to 8,000 yards (7,300 m) and challenged the ship, believing it to be Tyrwhitt's flagship, Arethusa. The German cruiser SMS Kolberg opened fire on Aurora in response, hitting the ship three times. Aurora returned fire and sent a signal to the fleet that she was in battle. The German armoured cruiser SMS Blücher was sunk. The light cruisers were ordered to standby to assist the crew of the sunken German cruiser. However, they came under air attack and the rescue efforts were cancelled.

In February 1915, she was assigned as leader of the 10th Destroyer Flotilla of the Harwich Force, guarding the eastern approaches to the English Channel. While a member of this unit, the cruiser was fitted with an aircraft flying-off platform over the forecastle allowing Aurora to launch a French monoplane. This was installed to counter the Zeppelin threat that harassed the Harwich Force. The design was ultimately unsuccessful as the aircraft could not intercept the Zeppelin fast enough and was uninstalled in August. The cruiser left the 10th Destroyer Flotilla in June and joined the 5th Light Cruiser Squadron, which Aurora remained with until the end of the war. That year, the cruiser also had her 3-pounder gun replaced with a QF 3-inch (76 mm) 20 cwt gun placed on the centreline aft.

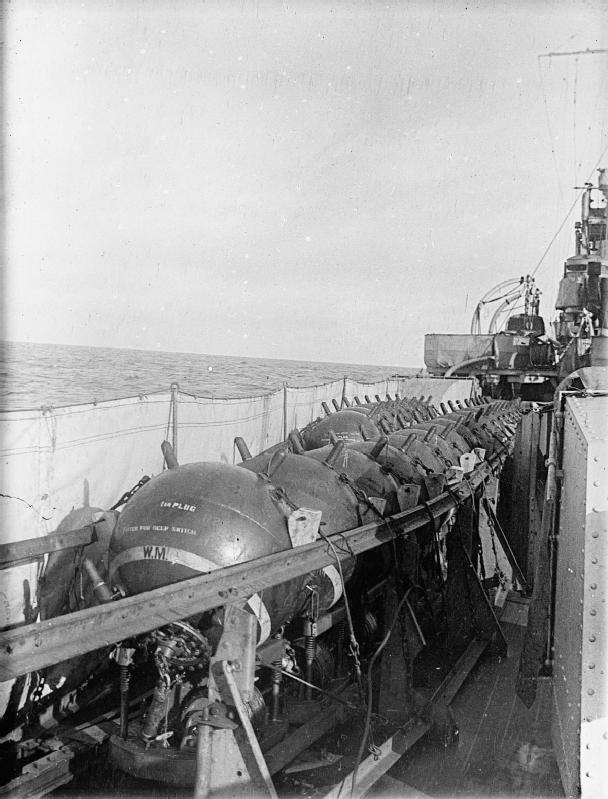
Mines ready for release, seen along the port side at Aurora's stern and screened by canvas, during World War I

In August 1915 she took part in sinking of the German raider Meteor. In September/October, the cruiser captured two naval trawlers In March 1916, Aurora covered the seaplane raid on Hoyer. In May 1917 the cruiser was fitted with chutes and rails for naval mines, which discharged over the stern. The ship carried 74 mines. Over the course of three mine-laying missions, the cruiser laid 212 mines. In 1917, the cruiser had her pole foremast replaced with a tripod carrying a light director and her torpedo tube armament was further augmented by a pair of tubes placed on the upper deck in front of the 6-inch gun. They were later moved ahead of the other torpedo tubes. In March 1918 Aurora was again reassigned, to the 7th Light Cruiser Squadron of the Grand Fleet. Aurora was one of the ships present at the surrender of the German High Seas Fleet in November 1918.

Between 1918 and 1920, Aurora was decommissioned to relieve financial pressures of the Home Fleet by the Admiralty. Her manning was reduced to a custodian crew and the relieved personnel were sent to other units. The cruiser remained in commission at Devonport from March 1919 to August 1920 and was paid off in September after being transferred to the Royal Canadian Navy.

=== Royal Canadian Navy ===
On 25 March 1920, the Canadian government accepted a British offer of one light cruiser and two destroyers to replace the two decrepit cruisers currently owned by Canada. Originally a Bristol-class cruiser was offered, however they ran on coal and the Canadian government negotiated for an oil-burning cruiser. In 1920 Aurora was re-activated to outfit her for transfer to the Royal Canadian Navy. The cost of fitting out the cruiser for service in the northern Atlantic cost $10,495, exclusive of machinery and a refrigeration plant.

The Royal Canadian Navy commissioned her on 1 November 1920. She sailed shortly afterward from the United Kingdom for Halifax, Nova Scotia, arriving on 21 December with two ex-Royal Navy destroyers that had also been transferred.

After a minimal time in port at HMC Dockyard, the three ships set out for a training cruise via the Caribbean Sea to Esquimalt, British Columbia. The cruise masked the secret mission of carrying secret documents from the Admiralty to British consulates throughout Central and North America. While on the cruise, the squadron was ordered to Puntarenas, Costa Rica, where their presence was used to strengthen the Canadian government position in negotiations over oil concessions. Aurora returned to Halifax on 30 July 1921 via the same route.

In August 1921, drastic budget cuts resulted in the decommissioning of Aurora. She was paid off on 1 July 1922 and disarmed. Her weapons were placed ashore in training facilities and on other active ships. Her crew was reduced to non-manned, much of her up-to-date equipment was salvaged for use in other Canadian warships. Aurora's hulk was left alongside a jetty at the Canadian naval base in Halifax until 1927 when her deterioration resulted in city officials demanding the navy move her. The Royal Canadian Navy immediately sold her for scrap in August 1927 to A.A. Lasseque of Sorel, Quebec, and she was broken up.

== Bibliography ==
- Brown, David K. (2010). The Grand Fleet: Warship Design and Development 1906–1922. Seaforth Publishing. ISBN 978-1-84832-085-7.
- Colledge, J. J.; Warlow, Ben & Bush, Steve (2020). Ships of the Royal Navy: The Complete Record of all Fighting Ships of the Royal Navy from the 15th Century to the Present (5th revised and updated ed.). Seaforth Publishing. ISBN 978-1-5267-9327-0.
- Corbett, Julian. Naval Operations to the Battle of the Falklands. History of the Great War: Based on Official Documents. Vol. I (2nd ed.). Imperial War Museum and Battery Press. ISBN 0-89839-256-X.
- Corbett, Julian (1997) [1929]. Naval Operations. History of the Great War: Based on Official Documents. Vol. II (Second ed.). Imperial War Museum in association with the Battery Press. ISBN 1-870423-74-7.
- Friedman, Norman (2010). British Cruisers: Two World Wars and After. Naval Institute Press. ISBN 978-1-59114-078-8.
- Johnston, William; Rawling, William G.P.; Gimblett, Richard H. & MacFarlane, John (2010). The Seabound Coast: The Official History of the Royal Canadian Navy, 1867–1939. Vol. 1. Dundurn Press. ISBN 978-1-55488-908-2.
- Macpherson, Ken & Barrie, Ron (2002). Warships of Canada's Naval Forces 1910–2002 (3 ed.). Vanwell Publishing Ltd. ISBN 1-55125-072-1.
- Massie, Robert K. (2003). Castles of Steel: Britain, Germany, and the Winning of the Great War at Sea. Ballantine Books. ISBN 0-345-40878-0.
- Milner, Marc (2010). Canada's Navy: The First Century (Second ed.). University of Toronto Press. ISBN 978-0-8020-9604-3.
- Newbolt, Henry (1996) [1931]. Naval Operations. History of the Great War Based on Official Documents. Vol. V. Battery Press. ISBN 0-89839-255-1.
- Pearsall, Alan (1984). "Arethusa Class Cruisers, Part I". Warship. VIII. Conway Maritime Press: 203–11. ISBN 0-87021-983-9.
- Pearsall, Alan (1984). "Arethusa Class Cruisers, Part II". Warship. VIII. Conway Maritime Press: 258–65. ISBN 0-87021-983-9.
- Preston, Antony (1985). "Great Britain and Empire Forces". In Gray, Randal (ed.). Conway's All the World's Fighting Ships 1906–1921. Naval Institute Press. pp. 1–104. ISBN 0-85177-245-5.
