= HMS Royalist (1915) =

Royal Navy Arethusa-class light cruiser

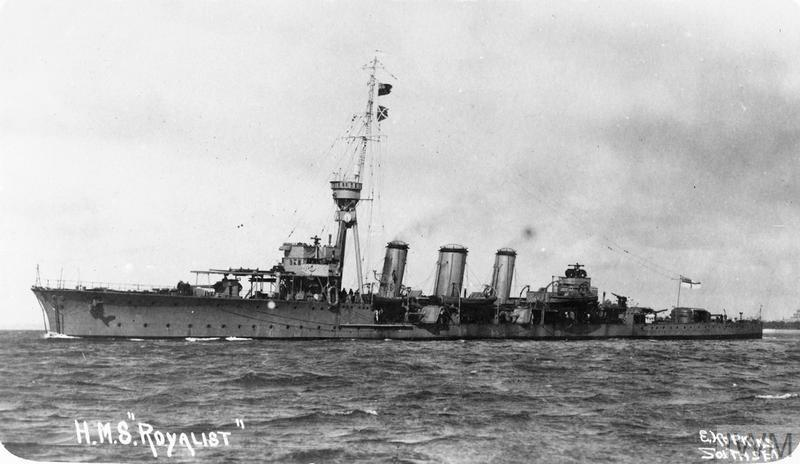
- Royalist

History

United Kingdom
- Name: Royalist
- Builder: William Beardmore and Company
- Laid down: 3 June 1913
- Launched: 14 January 1915
- Commissioned: March 1915
- Identification: Pennant number: 4A (1914); 6A (Jan 18); 75 (Apr 18); 54 (Nov 19)
- Fate: Sold for scrap, 24 August 1922

General characteristics (as built)
- Class & type: Arethusa-class light cruiser
- Displacement: 3,512 long tons (3,568 t)
- Length: 436 ft (132.9 m) (o/a)
- Beam: 39 ft (11.9 m)
- Draught: 15 ft 7 in (4.75 m) (mean, deep load)
- Installed power: 8 × Yarrow boilers; 40,000 shp (30,000 kW)
- Propulsion: 4 × shafts; 4 × steam turbines
- Speed: 28.5 kn (52.8 km/h; 32.8 mph)
- Complement: 270
- Armament: 2 × single 6 in (152 mm) guns; 6 × single 4 in (102 mm) guns; 1 × single 3-pdr (47 mm (1.9 in)) AA gun; 2 × twin 21 in (533 mm) torpedo tubes
- Armour: Waterline belt: 1–3 in (25–76 mm); Deck: 1 in (25 mm)

HMS Royalist was one of eight Arethusa-class light cruisers built for the Royal Navy in the 1910s. She fought in the First World War, participating in the Battle of Jutland. Following the war, she was scrapped.

== Design and description ==
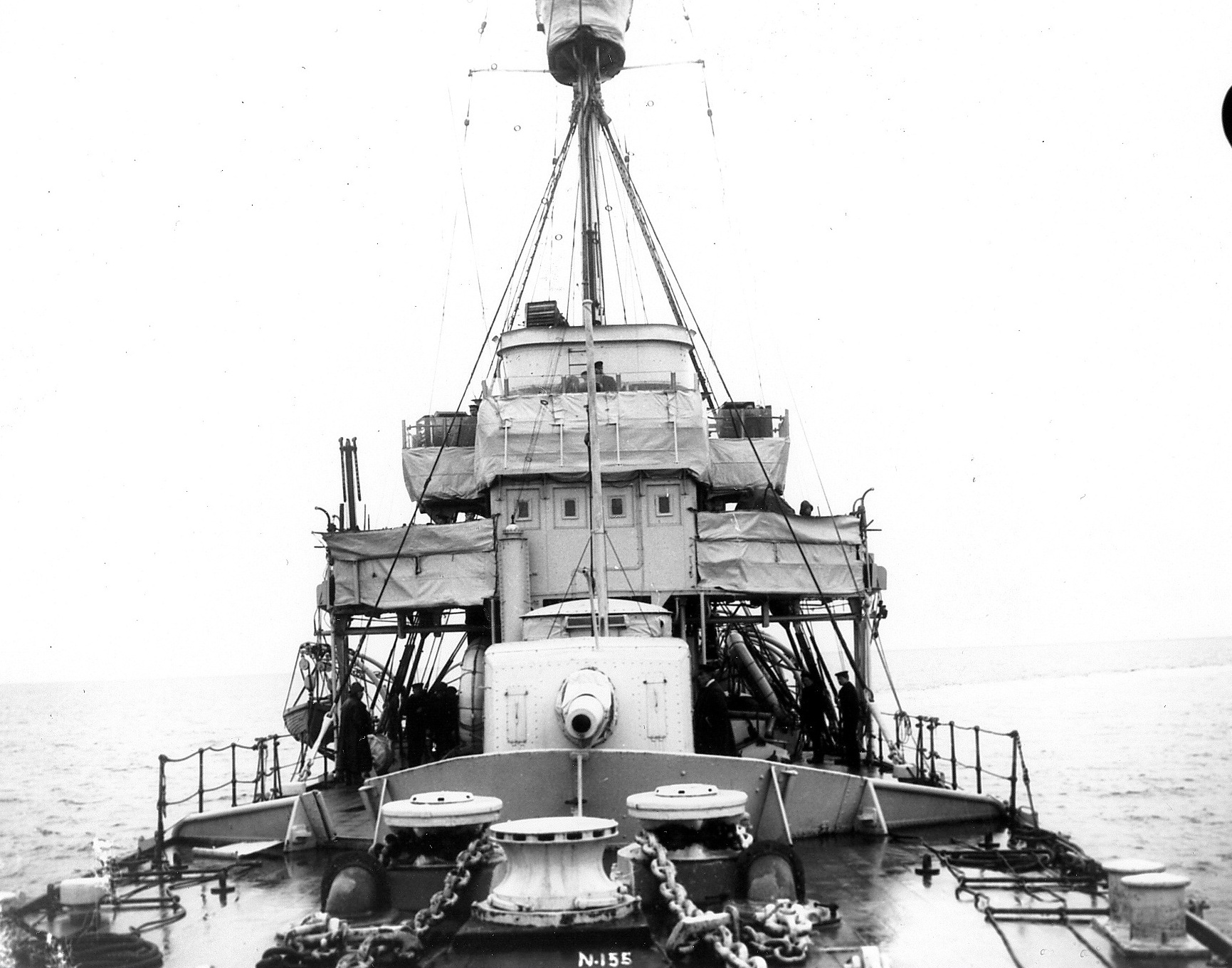
View of Royalist's forward 6-inch gun from the bow

The Arethusa-class cruisers were intended to lead destroyer flotillas and defend the fleet against attacks by enemy destroyers. The ships were 456 feet 6 inches (139.1 m) long overall, with a beam of 49 feet 10 inches (15.2 m) and a deep draught of 15 feet 3 inches (4.6 m). Displacement was 3,512 long tons (3,568 t) at normal and 4,400 long tons (4,500 t) at full load. Royalist was powered by four Parsons steam turbines, each driving one propeller shaft, which produced a total of 40,000 indicated horsepower (30,000 kW). The turbines used steam generated by eight Yarrow boilers which gave her a speed of about 28.5 knots (52.8 km/h; 32.8 mph). She carried 840 long tons (853 t) tons of fuel oil that gave a range of 5,000 nautical miles (9,300 km; 5,800 mi) at 16 knots (30 km/h; 18 mph).

The main armament of the Arethusa-class ships was two BL 6-inch (152 mm) Mk XII guns that were mounted on the centreline fore and aft of the superstructure and six QF 4-inch Mk V guns in waist mountings. They were also fitted with a single QF 3-pounder 47 mm (1.9 in) anti-aircraft gun and four 21 in (533 mm) torpedo tubes in two twin mounts.

== Construction and career ==
She was launched on 14 January 1915 at William Beardmore and Company's shipyard. On being commissioned, she was assigned to the 4th Light Cruiser Squadron of the Grand Fleet. From 31 May to 1 June 1916 Royalist took part in the Battle of Jutland. She survived the battle and in February 1917 was reassigned to the 1st Light Cruiser Squadron of the Grand Fleet. She survived the First World War, and was sold for scrapping on 24 August 1922 to Cashmore, of Newport.

== Bibliography ==
- Brown, David K. (2010). The Grand Fleet: Warship Design and Development 1906–1922. Seaforth Publishing. ISBN 978-1-84832-085-7.
- Colledge, J. J.; Warlow, Ben & Bush, Steve (2020). Ships of the Royal Navy: The Complete Record of all Fighting Ships of the Royal Navy from the 15th Century to the Present (5th revised and updated ed.). Seaforth Publishing. ISBN 978-1-5267-9327-0.
- Corbett, Julian. Naval Operations to the Battle of the Falklands. History of the Great War: Based on Official Documents. Vol. I (2nd ed.). Imperial War Museum and Battery Press. ISBN 0-89839-256-X.
- Corbett, Julian (1997) [1929]. Naval Operations. History of the Great War: Based on Official Documents. Vol. II (Second ed.). Imperial War Museum in association with the Battery Press. ISBN 1-870423-74-7.
- Friedman, Norman (2010). British Cruisers: Two World Wars and After. Naval Institute Press. ISBN 978-1-59114-078-8.
- Newbolt, Henry (1996) [1931]. Naval Operations. History of the Great War Based on Official Documents. Vol. V. Battery Press. ISBN 0-89839-255-1.
- Pearsall, Alan (1984). "Arethusa Class Cruisers, Part I". Warship. VIII. Conway Maritime Press: 203–11. ISBN 0-87021-983-9.
- Pearsall, Alan (1984). "Arethusa Class Cruisers, Part II". Warship. VIII. Conway Maritime Press: 258–65. ISBN 0-87021-983-9.
- Preston, Antony (1985). "Great Britain and Empire Forces". In Gray, Randal (ed.). Conway's All the World's Fighting Ships 1906–1921. Naval Institute Press. pp. 1–104. ISBN 0-85177-245-5.
