= Allan Everett (Royal Navy officer) =

Royal Navy Admiral and Chief of the Royal Australian Navy (1868–1938)

Admiral Sir Alan Everett KCMG KCVO CB
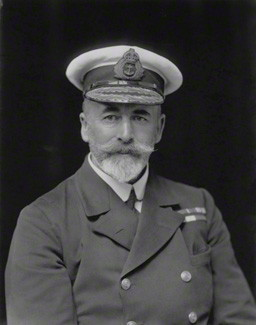
- Admiral Sir Allan Frederic Everett
- Born: Allan Frederic Everett; 22 February 1868
- Died: 22 January 1938 (aged 69); London, England
- Military career
- Allegiance: United Kingdom
- Branch: Royal Navy
- Service years: 1884–1926
- Rank: Admiral
- Commands: China Station (1924–25); Chief of the Australian Naval Staff (1921–23); 8th Light Cruiser Squadron (1919–21); 4th Light Cruiser Squadron (1918–19); HMS Neptune (1911–13); HMS Hercules (1911); HMS King Edward VII (1910–11); HMS Cumberland (1908–10); HMS Exe (1904–06); HMS Myrmidon (1904)
- Conflicts: First World War
- Awards: Knight Commander of the Order of St Michael and St George; Knight Commander of the Royal Victorian Order; Companion of the Order of the Bath

Admiral Sir Allan Frederic Everett, KCMG, KCVO, CB (22 February 1868 – 22 January 1938) was a Royal Navy officer who served as First Naval Member and Chief of the Australian Naval Staff from 1921 to 1923.

== Naval services ==
Born the fourth son of Colonel John Frederic Everett, Everett joined the Royal Navy as a midshipman in 1884. He became Captain of the Fleet for the Commander-in-Chief, Home Fleet in 1913 and at the start of the First World War found himself on the Staff of the Commander-in-Chief, Grand Fleet. He was made Naval Assistant to the First Sea Lord in 1915 and Aide-de-Camp to the King in 1916. He became Naval Secretary later that year and served in that role during the closing stages of the war. He was given command of the 4th Light Cruiser Squadron in October 1918. After the war he was given command of the 8th Light Cruiser Squadron in the Atlantic, before becoming First Naval Member and Chief of the Australian Naval Staff in 1921 and then Commander-in-Chief, China Station in November 1924. He suffered a breakdown in April 1925 and was relieved of his command shortly thereafter. He retired in 1926.

He died in London in January 1938.

== Family ==
In 1899 he married Michaelangela Katherine Carr.

== Bibliography ==
- Parkinson, Jonathan (2006). "Re: Destroyers in a Typhoon". Warship International. XLIII (4): 377–378. ISSN 0043-0374.

Military offices
Preceded by Sir Arthur Leveson	Commander-in-Chief, China Station; 1924–1925	Succeeded by Sir David Anderson (Acting)
Preceded by Sir Percy Grant	Chief of the Australian Naval Staff; 1921–1923	Succeeded by Percival Hall-Thompson
Preceded by Charles de Bartolomé	Naval Secretary; 1916–1918	Succeeded by Sir Rudolph Bentinck
