= Arethusa-class cruiser (1913) =

Class of Royal Navy light cruisers

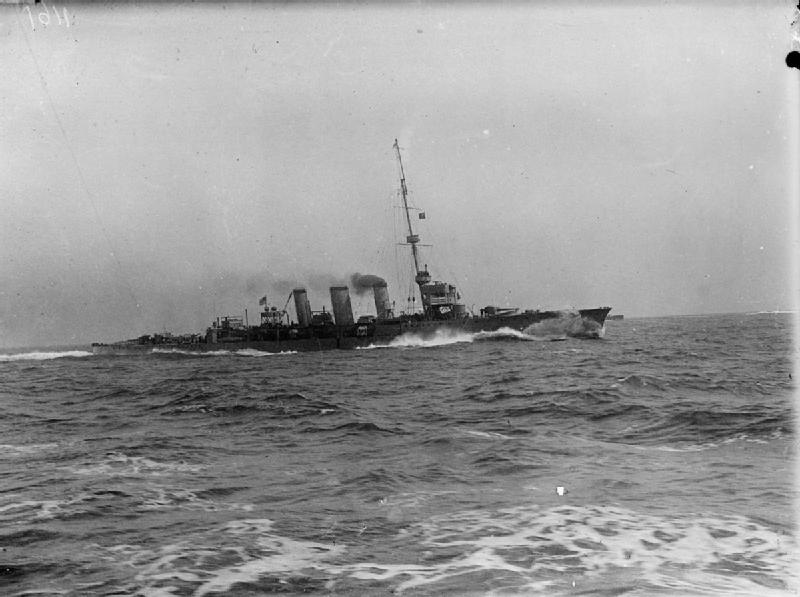
- Arethusa at speed

Class overview
- Name: Arethusa class
- Builders: William Beardmore (3); Vickers (2); Chatham Dockyard (1); Devonport Dockyard (1); Fairfield Shipbuilding & Eng. (1)
- Operators: Royal Navy; Royal Canadian Navy
- Preceded by: Town-class (1910)
- Succeeded by: C class
- Built: 1912–1915
- In commission: 1914–1924
- Completed: 8
- Lost: 1
- Scrapped: 7

General characteristics (as built)
- Type: Light cruiser
- Displacement: 3,512 long tons (3,568 t)
- Length: 436 ft (132.9 m) (o/a)
- Beam: 39 ft (11.9 m)
- Draught: 15 ft 7 in (4.75 m) (mean, deep load)
- Installed power: 8 × Yarrow boilers; 40,000 shp (30,000 kW)
- Propulsion: 4 × shafts; 4 × steam turbines
- Speed: 28.5 kn (52.8 km/h; 32.8 mph)
- Complement: 270
- Armament: 2 × single 6 in (152 mm) guns; 6 × single 4 in (102 mm) guns; 1 × single 3-pdr (47 mm (1.9 in)) AA gun; 2 × twin 21 in (533 mm) torpedo tubes
- Armour: Waterline belt: 1–3 in (25–76 mm); Deck: 1 in (25 mm)

The Arethusa-class cruisers were a class of eight oil-fired light cruisers of the Royal Navy all ordered in September 1912, primarily for service in the North Sea. They had three funnels with the middle one somewhat larger in diameter than the others. All served in the First World War. They were found to be very cramped internally.

== Design and description ==
The earlier scout cruisers were too slow to accomplish their intended duties of working with destroyer flotillas and defending the fleet against attacks by enemy destroyers. The primary emphasis of the Arethusa-class cruisers was a design speed of 30 knots (56 km/h; 35 mph), to allow them to lead destroyers in combat. In support of this goal, they were the first cruisers to use destroyer-type high-speed steam turbines and oil-fired boilers were chosen to save weight and increase their power to meet the specification. They retained the side protection introduced in the later ships of the previous Town class, but reverted to a mixed main armament that was a feature of the earlier ships of that class.

The ships were 456 feet 6 inches (139.1 m) long overall, with a beam of 49 feet 10 inches (15.2 m) and a deep draught of 15 feet 3 inches (4.6 m). Displacement was 3,512 long tons (3,568 t) at normal and 4,400 long tons (4,500 t) at full load. The Arethusa class were powered by four direct-drive steam turbines, each driving one propeller shaft, which produced a total of 40,000 indicated horsepower (30,000 kW) and gave a speed of about 28.5 knots (52.8 km/h; 32.8 mph). The six ships that used Parsons turbines were equipped with cruising turbines on the outer shafts, but the two ships that used Brown-Curtis turbines were not so fitted. The turbines used steam generated by eight Yarrow boilers at a working pressure of 235 psi (1,620 kPa; 17 kgf/cm^{2}). They carried 840 long tons (853 t) tons of fuel oil that gave the ships with cruising turbines a range of 5,000 nautical miles (9,300 km; 5,800 mi) and 3,200 nmi (5,900 km; 3,700 mi) for those without, both at 16 knots (30 km/h; 18 mph).

The main armament of the Arethusa-class ships was two BL 6-inch (152 mm) Mk XII guns that were mounted on the centreline fore and aft of the superstructure and six QF 4-inch Mk V guns in waist mountings. They were also fitted with a single QF 3-pounder 47 mm (1.9 in) anti-aircraft gun and four 21 in (533 mm) torpedo tubes in two twin mounts.

== Ships ==
- Arethusa, built by Chatham Dockyard, laid down 28 October 1912, launched 25 October 1913, and completed August 1914. She was sunk by mine off Felixstowe on 11 February 1916.
- Aurora, built by Devonport Dockyard, laid down 24 October 1912, launched 30 September 1913, and completed September 1914. She took part in the sinking of the German raider Meteor on 9 August 1915, was transferred to the Royal Canadian Navy in November 1920, and for sold for breaking up in August 1927.
- Galatea, built by William Beardmore and Company, Dalmuir, laid down 9 January 1913, launched 14 May 1914, and completed December 1914. She also took part in the sinking of the German raider Meteor on 9 August 1915, and was sold for breaking up 25 October 1921.
- Inconstant, built by William Beardmore and Company, laid down 3 April 1913, launched 6 July 1914, and completed January 1915. She was sold for breaking up 9 June 1922.

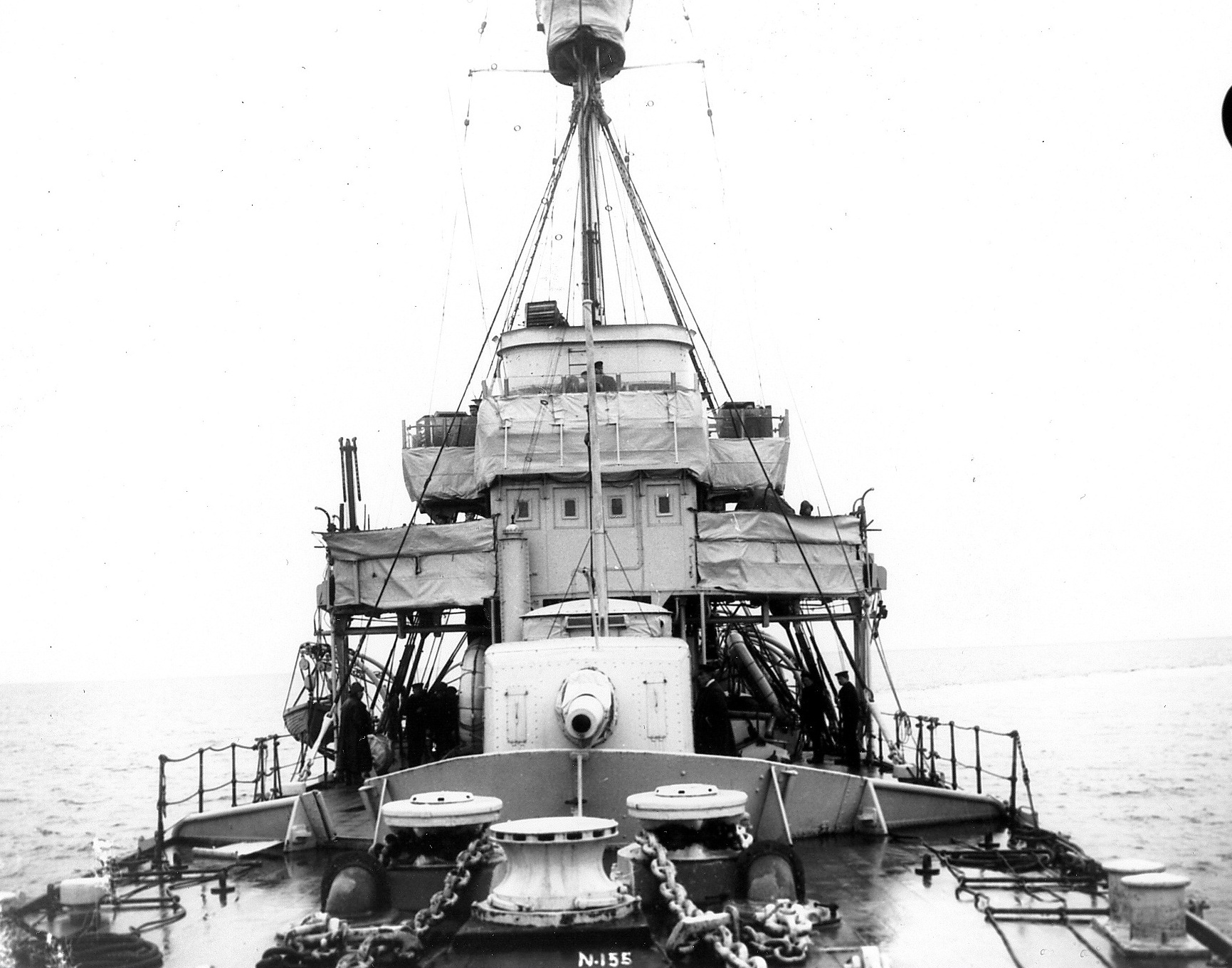
View from the bow of Royalist

- Penelope, built by Vickers Limited, Barrow in Furness, laid down 1 February 1913, launched 25 August 1914, and completed December 1914. She was damaged by a torpedo from the German submarine UB-29 on 25 April 1916, but repaired, and was sold for breaking up in October 1924.
- Phaeton, built by Vickers Limited, laid down 12 March 1913, launched 21 October 1914, and completed February 1915. She fought at the Dardanelles in 1915, and was sold for breaking up 16 January 1923.
- Royalist, built by William Beardmore and Company, laid down 3 June 1913, launched 14 January 1915, and completed March 1915. She was sold for breaking up 24 August 1922.
- Undaunted, built by Fairfield Shipbuilding and Engineering Company, Govan, laid down 21 December 1912, launched 28 April 1914, and completed August 1914. She took part in the Battle off Texel on 17 October 1914, and was sold for breaking up 9 April 1923.

Galatea, Inconstant, Phaeton and Royalist fought in the Battle of Jutland on 31 May 1916.

== Bibliography ==
- Brown, David K. (1983). "The Design of HMS Arethusa 1912". Warship International. XX (1): 35–40. ISSN 0043-0374.
- Brown, David K. (2010). The Grand Fleet: Warship Design and Development 1906–1922. Seaforth Publishing. ISBN 978-1-84832-085-7.
- Colledge, J. J.; Warlow, Ben & Bush, Steve (2020). Ships of the Royal Navy: The Complete Record of all Fighting Ships of the Royal Navy from the 15th Century to the Present (5th revised and updated ed.). Seaforth Publishing. ISBN 978-1-5267-9327-0.
- Corbett, Julian. Naval Operations to the Battle of the Falklands. History of the Great War: Based on Official Documents. Vol. I (2nd ed.). Imperial War Museum and Battery Press. ISBN 0-89839-256-X.
- Corbett, Julian (1997) [1929]. Naval Operations. History of the Great War: Based on Official Documents. Vol. II (Second ed.). Imperial War Museum in association with the Battery Press. ISBN 1-870423-74-7.
- Friedman, Norman (2010). British Cruisers: Two World Wars and After. Naval Institute Press. ISBN 978-1-59114-078-8.
- Friedman, Norman (2011). Naval Weapons of World War One: Guns, Torpedoes, Mines and ASW Weapons of All Nations; An Illustrated Directory. Seaforth Publishing. ISBN 978-1-84832-100-7.
- Newbolt, Henry (1996) [1931]. Naval Operations. History of the Great War Based on Official Documents. Vol. V. Battery Press. ISBN 0-89839-255-1.
- Pearsall, Alan (1984). "Arethusa Class Cruisers, Part I". Warship. VIII. Conway Maritime Press: 203–211. ISBN 0-87021-983-9.
- Pearsall, Alan (1984). "Arethusa Class Cruisers, Part II". Warship. VIII. Conway Maritime Press: 258–265. ISBN 0-87021-983-9.
- Preston, Antony (1985). "Great Britain and Empire Forces". In Gray, Randal (ed.). Conway's All the World's Fighting Ships 1906–1921. Naval Institute Press. pp. 1–104. ISBN 0-85177-245-5.
