= BL 6-inch Mk XII naval gun =

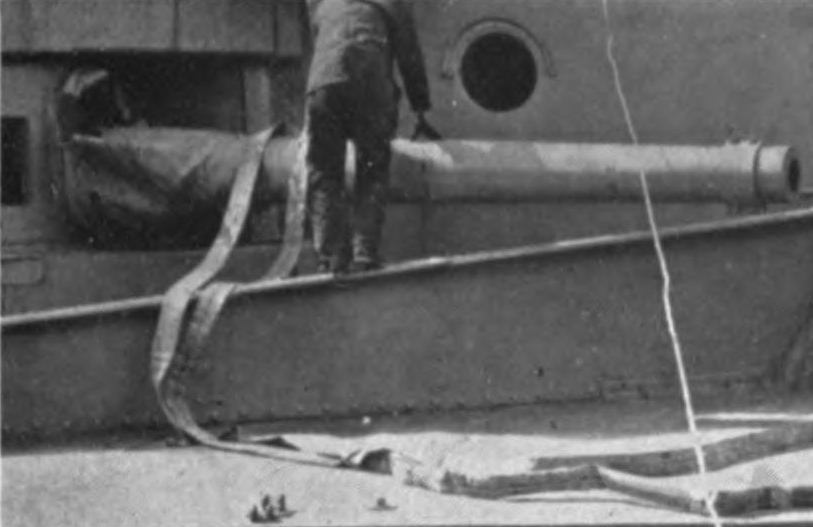
- Casemate gun on HMS Warspite after the Battle of Jutland, June 1916
- Type: Naval gun
- Place of origin: United Kingdom

Service history
- In service: 1914–2011
- Used by: British Empire
- Wars: World War I; World War II

Production history
- Designer: Vickers
- Designed: 1913
- Manufacturer: Vickers
- No. built: 463

Specifications
- Mass: 15,512 pounds (7,036 kg) barrel & breech
- Barrel length: 270 inches (6.858 m) bore (45 cal)
- Shell: 100 pounds (45.36 kg) Lyddite, Armour-piercing, Shrapnel
- Calibre: 6 inches (152.4 mm)
- Breech: Welin interrupted screw
- Recoil: Hydro-spring, 16.5 inches (420 mm)
- Elevation: −7°–30°
- Rate of fire: 5-7 rpm
- Muzzle velocity: 2,825 feet per second (861 m/s)
- Maximum firing range: 19,660 metres (21,500 yd)

The BL 6-inch Mark XII naval gun was a British 45 calibre naval gun which was mounted as primary armament on light cruisers and secondary armament on dreadnought battleships commissioned in the period 1914–1926, and remained in service on many warships until the end of World War II.

== Design ==
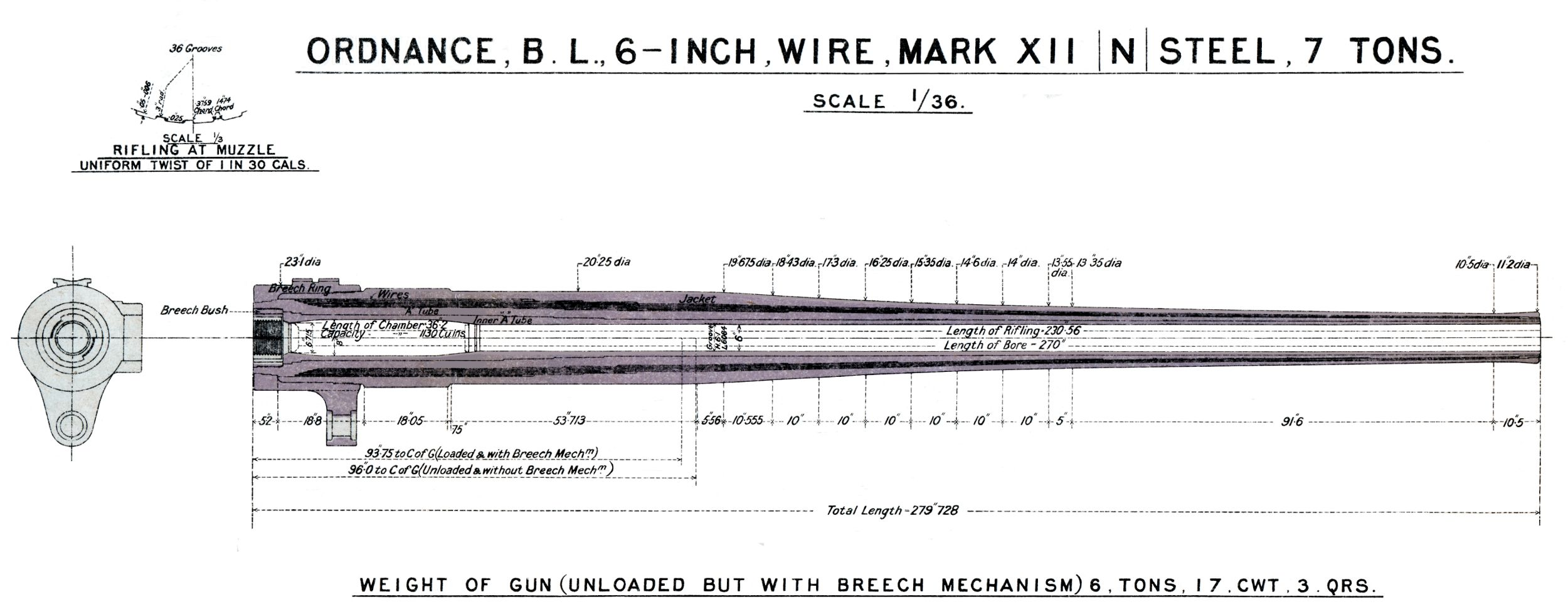

This was a high-velocity naval gun consisting of inner "A" tube, "A" tube, wound with successive layers of steel wire, with a jacket over the wire.

== Naval service ==
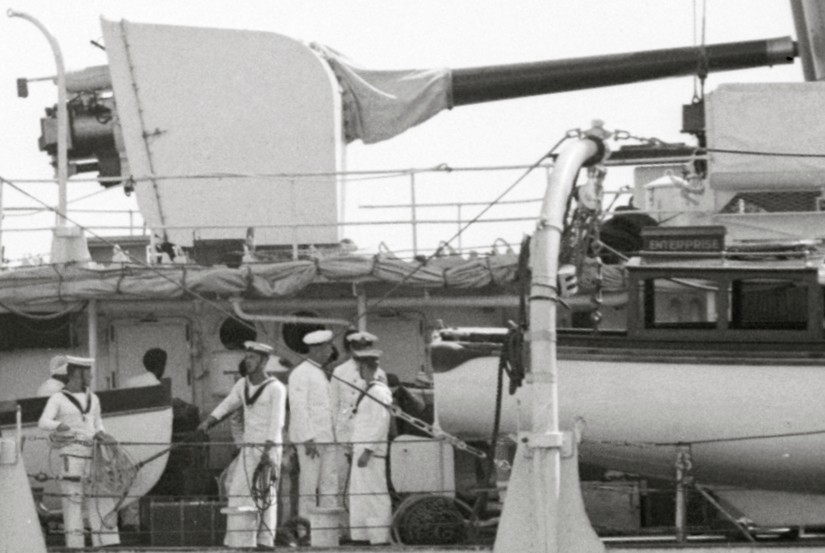
Single gun on CP mounting on cruiser HMS Enterprise

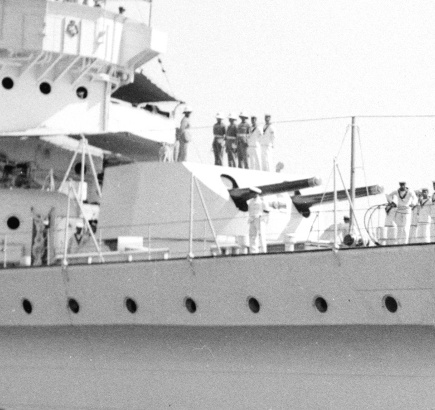
Experimental twin turret on HMS Enterprise, seen in 1936, which formed the prototype for twin 6-inch turrets for the Nelson-class battleships, as well as the Leander and Arethusa-class cruisers

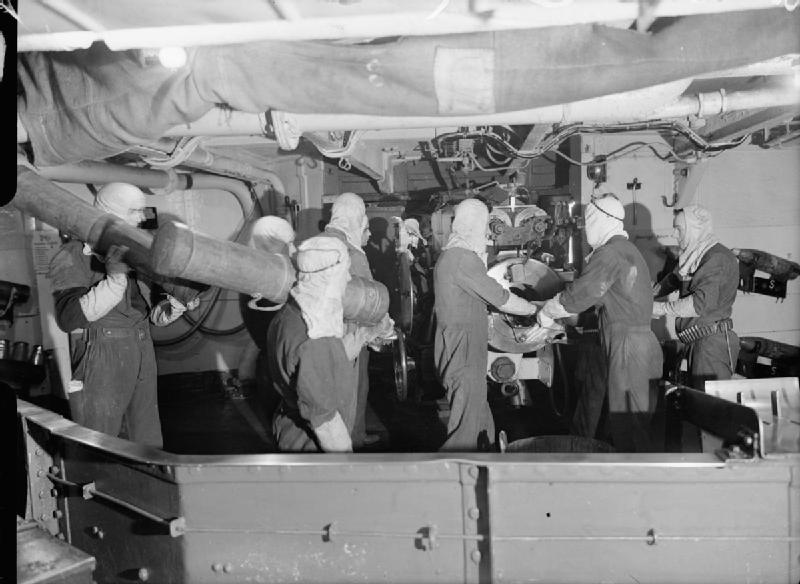
Gunners load a casemate gun on battleship HMS Malaya, May 1943. The men at left carry cordite cartridges, still in their storage cases, on their shoulders

It superseded the 45-calibre Mk VII gun and the longer 50-calibre Mk XI gun which had proved unwieldy in light cruisers due to its length, and was Britain's most modern 6-inch naval gun when World War I began.

It was superseded as secondary armament on new battleships in the 1920s by the 50-calibre 6-inch Mk XXII gun, and as main armament on new light cruisers in the 1930s by the 50-calibre 6-inch Mk XXIII gun.

Guns were mounted in the following ships :

- Birmingham-class light cruisers laid down 1912, commissioned 1914
- Arethusa-class light cruisers laid down 1912, commissioned 1914
- C-class light cruisers of 1914
- M29-class monitors of 1915
- Queen Elizabeth-class battleships laid down 1912, commissioned 1915
- Revenge-class battleships laid down 1913, commissioned 1916
- Destroyer leader HMS Swift as re-gunned in 1917
- Danae-class (or D-class) light cruisers completed 1918–1919
- Monitors HMS Raglan and HMS Abercrombie from 1918
- Emerald-class (or E-class) light cruisers laid down 1918, commissioned 1926

== Coast defence gun ==
During World War II some Mk XII guns were used in emergency coast defense batteries.

== Notable actions ==
- Ordinary Seaman John Henry Carless was posthumously awarded the Victoria Cross for heroism in serving his gun on HMS Caledon during the Second Battle of Heligoland Bight on 17 November 1917.

== Ammunition ==
This gun generated a higher pressure in the chamber on firing compared to preceding 6-inch guns such as Mk VII and Mk XI. This necessitated use of special shells capable of withstanding a pressure of 20 tons per square inch on firing, which had "Q" suffixed to the name. World War I shells were marked "A.Q." denoting special 4 CRH shells for this gun.

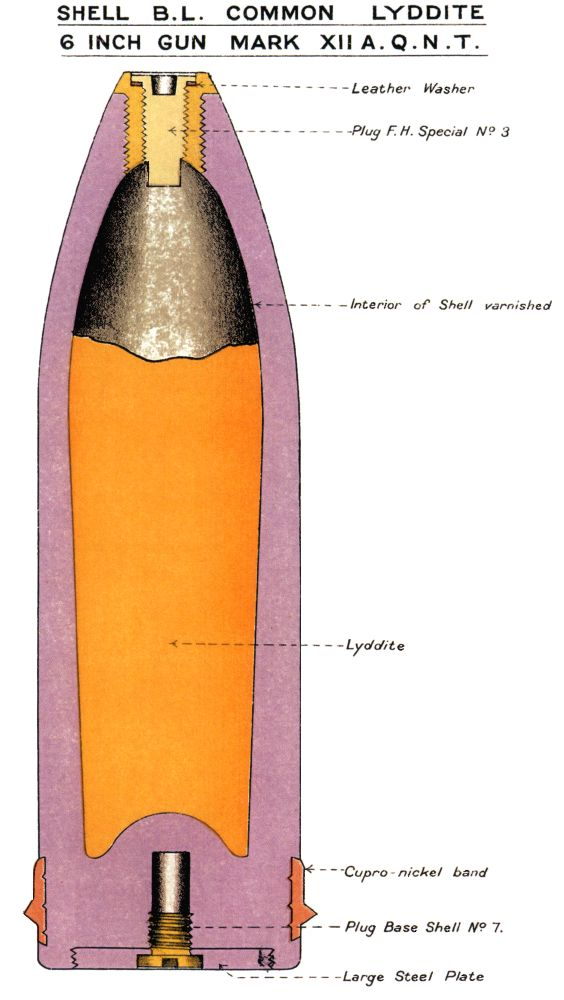
Mk XII A.Q.N.T. Common lyddite shell with night tracer, 1914

== See also ==
- List of naval guns

=== Weapons of comparable role, performance and era ===
- 15 cm SK L/45 German equivalent

== Surviving examples ==
- On monitor HMS M33 at Portsmouth Historic Dockyard, UK
- A gun from HMAS Adelaide at HMAS Cerberus naval base, Victoria, Australia

== Bibliography ==
- Campbell, John (January 1984). Gray, Randal (ed.). "British Naval Guns, 1880–1945, No. 12". Warship (29): 30–32.
- "Handbook for the 6-inch Breech Loading Mark XII. Gun" G.21117/17. Admiralty, Gunnery Branch, 1917.
