= Strength of ships =

Topic in naval architecture

The strength of ships is a topic of key interest to naval architects and shipbuilders. Ships which are built too strong are heavy, slow, and cost extra money to build and operate since they weigh more, whilst ships which are built too weakly suffer from minor hull damage and, in some extreme cases, catastrophic failure and sinking.

== Loads on ship hulls ==
The hulls of ships are subjected to a number of loads.

- Even when sitting at dockside or at anchor, the pressure of surrounding water displaced by the ship presses in on its hull.
- The weight of the hull, and of cargo and components within the ship bears down on the hull.
- Wind blows against the hull, and waves run into it.
- When a ship moves, there is additional hull drag, the force of propellers, water driven up against the bow.
- When a ship is loaded with cargo, it may have many times its own empty weight of cargo pushing down on the structure.
- In heavy seas, water flowing over or crashing down onto the weather deck applies (possibly immense) loads on the deck and transverse loads on the superstructure or other deck features such as coamings and hatches.

If the ship's structure, equipment, and cargo are distributed unevenly there may be large point loads into the structure, and if they are distributed differently from the distribution of buoyancy from displaced water then there are bending forces on the hull.

When ships are drydocked, and when they are being built, they are supported on regularly spaced posts on their bottoms.

=== Primary hull loads, strength, and bending ===
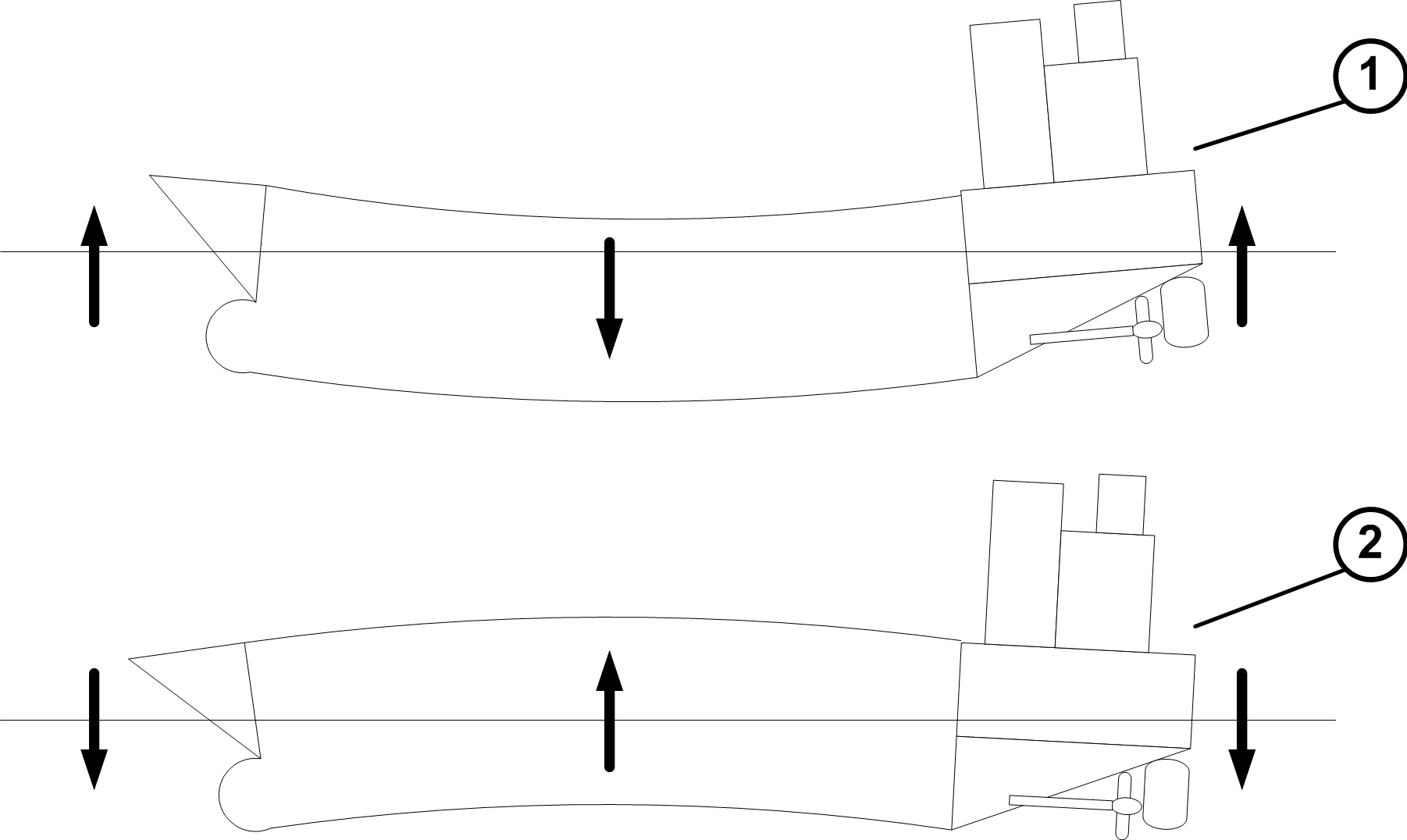
Diagram of ship hull (1) Sagging and (2) Hogging under loads. Bending is exaggerated for illustration purposes.

The primary strength, loads, and bending of a ship's hull are the loads that affect the whole hull, viewed from front to back and top to bottom. Though this could be considered to include overall transverse loads (from side to side within the ship), generally it is applied to longitudinal loads (from end to end) only. The hull, viewed as a single beam, can bend

1. down in the center, known as sagging
2. up in the center, known as hogging.

This can be due to:

- hull, machinery, and cargo loads
- wave loads, with the worst cases of:
  - sagging, due to a wave with length equal to the ship's length, and peaks at the bow and stern and a trough amidships
  - hogging, due to a wave with length equal to the ship's length, and a peak amidships (right at the middle of the length)

Primary hull bending loads are generally highest near the middle of the ship, and usually very minor past halfway to the bow or stern.

Primary strength calculations generally consider the midships cross section of the ship. These calculations treat the whole ships structure as a single beam, using the simplified Euler–Bernoulli beam equation to calculate the strength of the beam in longitudinal bending. The moment of inertia (technically, second moment of area) of the hull section is calculated by finding the neutral or central axis of the beam and then totaling up the quantity $I_y=\frac{bh^3}{12}+Ad^2$ for each section of plate or girder making up the hull, with $I_y$ being the moment of inertia of that section of material, $b$ being the width (horizontal dimension) of the section, $h$ being the height of the section (vertical dimension), $A$ being the area of the section and $d$ being the vertical distance of the center of that section from the neutral axis.

Primary (1), Secondary (2), and Tertiary (3) structural analysis of a ship hull. Depicted internal components include a watertight bulkhead (4) at the primary and secondary level, the ship's hull bottom structure including keel, keelsons, and transverse frames between two bulkheads (5) at the secondary level, and transverse frames (6), longitudinal stiffeners (7), and the hull plating (8) at the tertiary level.

Primary strength loads calculations usually total up the ships weight and buoyancy along the hull, dividing the hull into manageable lengthwise sections such as one compartment, arbitrary ten foot segments, or some such manageable subdivision. For each loading condition, the displaced water weight or buoyancy is calculated for that hull section based on the displaced volume of water within that hull section. The weight of the hull is similarly calculated for that length, and the weight of equipment and systems. Cargo weight is then added in to that section depending on the loading conditions being checked.

The total still water bending moment is then calculated by integrating the difference between buoyancy and total weight along the length of the ship.

For a ship in motion, additional bending moment is added to that value to account for waves it may encounter. Standard formulas for wave height and length are used, which take ship size into account. The worst possible waves are, as noted above, where either a wave crest or trough is located exactly amidships.

Those total bending loads, including still water bending moment and wave loads, are the forces that the overall hull primary beam has to be capable of withstanding.

=== Secondary hull loads, strength, and bending ===
The secondary hull loads, bending, and strength are those loads that happen to the skin structure of the ship (sides, bottom, deck) between major lengthwise subdivisions or bulkheads. For these loads, we are interested in how this shorter section behaves as an integrated beam, under the local forces of displaced water pushing back on the hull, cargo and hull and machinery weights, etc. Unlike primary loads, secondary loads are treated as applying to a complex composite panel, supported at the sides, rather than as a simple beam.

Secondary loads, strength, and bending are calculated similarly to primary loads: you determine the point and distributed loads due to displacement and weight, and determine local total forces on each unit area of the panel. Those loads then cause the composite panel to deform, usually bending inwards between bulkheads as most loads are compressive and directed inwards. Stress in the structure is calculated from the loads and bending.

=== Tertiary hull loads, strength, and bending ===
Tertiary strength and loads are the forces, strength, and bending response of individual sections of hull plate between stiffeners, and the behaviour of individual stiffener sections. Usually the tertiary loading is simpler to calculate: for most sections, there is a simple, maximum hydrostatic load or hydrostatic plus slamming load to calculate. The plate is supported against those loads at its edges by stiffeners and beams. The deflection of the plate (or stiffener), and additional stresses, are simply calculated from those loads and the theory of plates and shells.

==== Ship hull structure elements ====
Structural Elements of a Ship's Hull

This diagram shows the key structural elements of a ship's main hull (excluding the bow, stern, and deckhouse).

1. Deck plating (a.k.a. Main Deck, Weatherdeck or Strength Deck)
2. Transverse bulkhead
3. Inner bottom shell plating
4. Hull bottom shell plating
5. Transverse frame (1 of 2)
6. Keel frame
7. Keelson (longitudinal girder) (1 of 4)
8. Longitudinal stiffener (1 of 18)
9. Hull side beam

The depicted hull is a sample small double bottom (but not double hull) oil tanker.

=== Total loads, bending, and strength ===
The total load on a particular section of a ship's hull is the sum total of all primary, secondary, and tertiary loads imposed on it from all factors. The typical test case for quick calculations is the middle of a hull bottom plate section between stiffeners, close to or at the midsection of the ship, somewhere midways between the keel and the side of the ship.

== Standard rules ==
Ship classification societies such as Det Norske Veritas, American Bureau of Shipping, and Lloyd's Register of shipping have established standard calculation forms for hull loads, strength requirements, the thickness of hull plating and reinforcing stiffeners, girders, and other structures. These methods often give a quick way to estimate strength requirements for any given ship. Almost always those methods will give conservative, or stronger than precisely required, strength values. However, they provide a detailed starting point for analyzing a given ship's structure and whether it meets industry common standards or not.

== Material response ==
Modern ships are, almost without exception, built of steel. Generally this is fairly standard steel with yield strength of around 32,000 to 36,000 psi (220 to 250 MPa) and tensile strength or ultimate tensile strength (UTS) over 50,000 psi (340 MPa).

Shipbuilders today use steels which have good corrosion resistance when exposed to seawater and which do not get brittle at low temperatures (below freezing). Many ships endure cold winter storms, and the use of some older ship steels that were not tough enough at low temperature caused ships to crack in half and sink in the Atlantic during World War II.

The benchmark steel grade is ABS A, specified by the American Bureau of Shipping. This steel has a yield strength of at least 34,000 psi (230 MPa), possesses an ultimate tensile strength of 58,000 to 71,000 psi (400 to 490 MPa), and must elongate at least 19% in an 8-inch (200 mm) long specimen before fracturing and 22% in a 2-inch (50 mm) long specimen.

A safety factor above the yield strength has to be applied, since steel regularly pushed to its yield strength will suffer from metal fatigue. Steels typically have a fatigue limit, below which any number of stress load cycles will not cause metal fatigue and cracks/failures. Ship design criteria generally assume that all normal loads on the ship, times a moderate safety factor, should be below the fatigue limit for the steel used in their construction. It is wise to assume that the ship will regularly operate fully loaded, in heavy weather and strong waves, and that it will encounter its maximum normal design operating conditions many times over its lifetime.

Designing underneath the fatigue limit coincidentally and beneficially gives large (factor of up to 6 or more) total safety factors from normal maximum operating loads to ultimate tensile failure of the structure. But those large ultimate safety margins are not the intent: the intent is that the basic operational stress and strain on the ship, throughout its intended service life, should not cause serious fatigue cracks in the structure. Very few ships ever see ultimate load conditions anywhere near their gross failure limits. It is likely that, without fatigue concerns, ship strength requirements would be somewhat lower.

== Numerical modeling ==
While it is possible to develop fairly accurate analyses of ship loads and responses by hand or using minimal computer aids such as spreadsheets, modern CAD computer programs are usually used today to generate much more detailed and powerful computer models of the structure. Finite element analysis tools are used to measure the behaviour in detail as loads are applied. These programs can handle much more complex bending and point load calculations than human engineers are able to in reasonable amounts of time.

However, it is still important to be able to manually calculate rough behaviour of ship hulls. Engineers do not trust the output of computer programs without some general reality checking that the results are within the expected order of magnitude. Additionally, Preliminary designs may be started before enough information on a structure is available to perform a computer analysis.

== See also ==
- Naval architecture
- Shipbuilding
- Bulkhead (partition)
- Double bottom
- Shell plating
- Beam
- Strength of materials
