= Sea Machines Robotics =

Startup in Boston, Massachusetts, US

- Type: Private
- Industry: Software
- Founded: 2015
- Headquarters: Boston, MA
- Key people: Michael G. Johnson (Founder)
- Website: https://sea-machines.com

Sea Machines Robotics is a Boston, MA-based startup that is developing autonomous control and navigation systems for the commercial marine and boating industries.

== Overview ==
Sea Machines Robotics was founded in 2015 as an idea to marine engineer Michael G. Johnson while he was working on an oil-spill response team in the Arctic.

Sea Machines systems equips ships and workboats with autonomous systems that allow them to work remotely, increase safety for maritime crews and improve operator productivity. The company operates its headquarters from Boston, MA, with a test fleet operating in the Boston Harbor.

In 2017, Sea Machines raised $1.5 million in seed financing from lead investor Launch Capital, along with Accomplice VC, LDV Capital, the Geekdom Fund and Techstars.

The company closed a $10 million Series A investment round in 2018, led by Accomplice, Eniac Ventures, Toyota AI Ventures; Brunswick Corp. (through TechNexus Venture Collaborative); NextGen VP, Geekdom Fund; LaunchCapital and LDV Capital. The round brought the total capital Sea Machines had raised to $12.5 million. Also in 2018, Sea Machines expanded internationally by opening a second office in Hamburg, Germany.

In April 2018, the company entered an agreement with A.P. Moller-Maersk, of Copenhagen, to trial its in-development advanced perception and situational awareness technology aboard a Maersk Winter Palace ice-class container ship. The installation is the first time computer vision, Light Detection and Ranging (LiDAR) and perception software has been utilized aboard a container vessel to augment and upgrade transit operations.

In July 2020, the company closed a $15 million financing round with participation by Huntington Ingalls Industries (HII). The investment round was led by Accomplice with further participation by Toyota AI Ventures, Brunswick Corp. (TechNexus), Geekdom Fund, NextGen Venture Partners, Eniac VC, LaunchCapital and others. Later that year, in October, the company announced that it had completed its $20M investment goal with the second close of $5M.The latest round was funded by investors Brunswick Corporation and their investment partner TechNexus, Toyota AI Ventures, NextGen Venture Partners, and new Sea Machines investor, Dolby Family Ventures.

The company has raised a total of $32.3 million to date.

== Vessel Control Systems ==
In 2018, Sea Machines released its line of intelligent autonomous command and remote-control systems for workboats and other vessels to commercial markets.

SM300 Autonomous Command and Control

The SM300 autonomous-command and remote-helm control system enable autonomous control of workboats from a secondary location, which could include an on-vessel location outside of the wheelhouse, from a second vessel, or from a shoreside location.

In August 2019, Sea Machines demonstrated the capabilities of its SM300 aboard a manned Marine Spill Response Corporation (MSRC) skimming vessel as it executed oil-spill recovery exercises in the harbor for the U.S. Department of Transportation Maritime Administration (MARAD).

In May 2019, Sea Machines partnered with Hike Metal, a manufacturer of workboats based in Ontario, Canada, to integrate the SM300 aboard commercial vessels tasked with search-and-rescue (SAR) missions.

SM200 Remote-Helm Control System

The SM200 remote-helm control system enables wireless helm and propulsion control, as well as remote control of auxiliaries and payload equipment, freeing mariners from the wheelhouse to conduct operations from any location that offers the greatest visibility and safety. In 2020, the U.S. Coast Guard (USCG) and American Bureau of Shipping (ABS) approved the SM200 for installation aboard a class of U.S.-flag tugboats that support articulated tug-barge (ATB) sets.

JETSense Intelligent Voyage Control

In partnership with HamiltonJet, Sea Machines launched a new intelligent voyage control product, JETsense, for commercial waterjet vessels that utilizes autonomous navigation, multi-sensor fusion and computer vision. JETsense utilizes Artificial Intelligence (AI) and autonomy to perceive the domain and maintain precise control of steering and speed during a voyage and re-route to avoid traffic and obstacles.

== Class & Regulator Approvals ==
Bureau Veritas Type Approval for Wireless Control Technology (2022)

Bureau Veritas granted Type Approval to Sea Machines' commercial wireless remote-control helm system in 2022. This Type Approval includes the wireless control technology embedded in both Sea Machines’ SM200 and SM300 systems, and ensures the technology has undergone rigorous third-party testing and certification to meet the stringent demands of Classification and Flag State requirements for critical equipment on board marine vessels.

USCG and ABS Approvals for SM200 Wireless Helm Aboard Tugboats Supporting ATBs (2020)

The U.S. Coast Guard and American Bureau of Shipping approved Sea Machines' SM200 commercial wireless helm for installation aboard a class of U.S.-flag tugboats that support articulated tug-barge (ATB) sets. The two bodies granted their approvals after reviewing Sea Machines’ technology and the SM200's applications aboard these tugs, deeming the system satisfactory for shipboard installation and trials.

== Projects ==
U.S. Department of Defense's Defense Innovation Unit (2020-2021)

In October 2020, the U.S. Department of Defense engaged Sea Machines to engineer, build and demonstrate ready-to-deploy autonomy system kits that transform existing commercial barges to autonomous platforms capable of landing and replenishing military aircraft. In August 2021, the Department of Defense allocated $3.1M to the project to transition Sea Machines' solution from the proof of concept stage to the design and trial stage, and ultimately bringing the prototype equipment kits to life.

Collaboration with Rolls-Royce (2021)

In September 2021, Rolls-Royce and Sea Machines collaborated to develop and sell remote command, autonomous control and intelligent crew support systems for the marine market. The collaboration offers autonomy solutions for yachts, as well as commercial and government vessels.

The Machine Odyssey (2021)

Sea Machines accomplished a long-haul remotely-commanded autonomous navigation mission in October 2021 called The Machine Odyssey. Using a Damen-built tugboat named Nellie Bly outfitted with the Sea Machines SM300, the vessel autonomously navigated more than 1,000 nautical miles over 13 days around the Danish islands of Zealand, Funen, and Laeso and north to Skagen, then down through the Kiel Canal to Hamburg, Germany. The vessel was remotely commanded by merchant marine officers stationed over 3,000 miles away in Boston, MA.
