= HMS Prince of Wales (53) =

King George V-class battleship of the Royal Navy

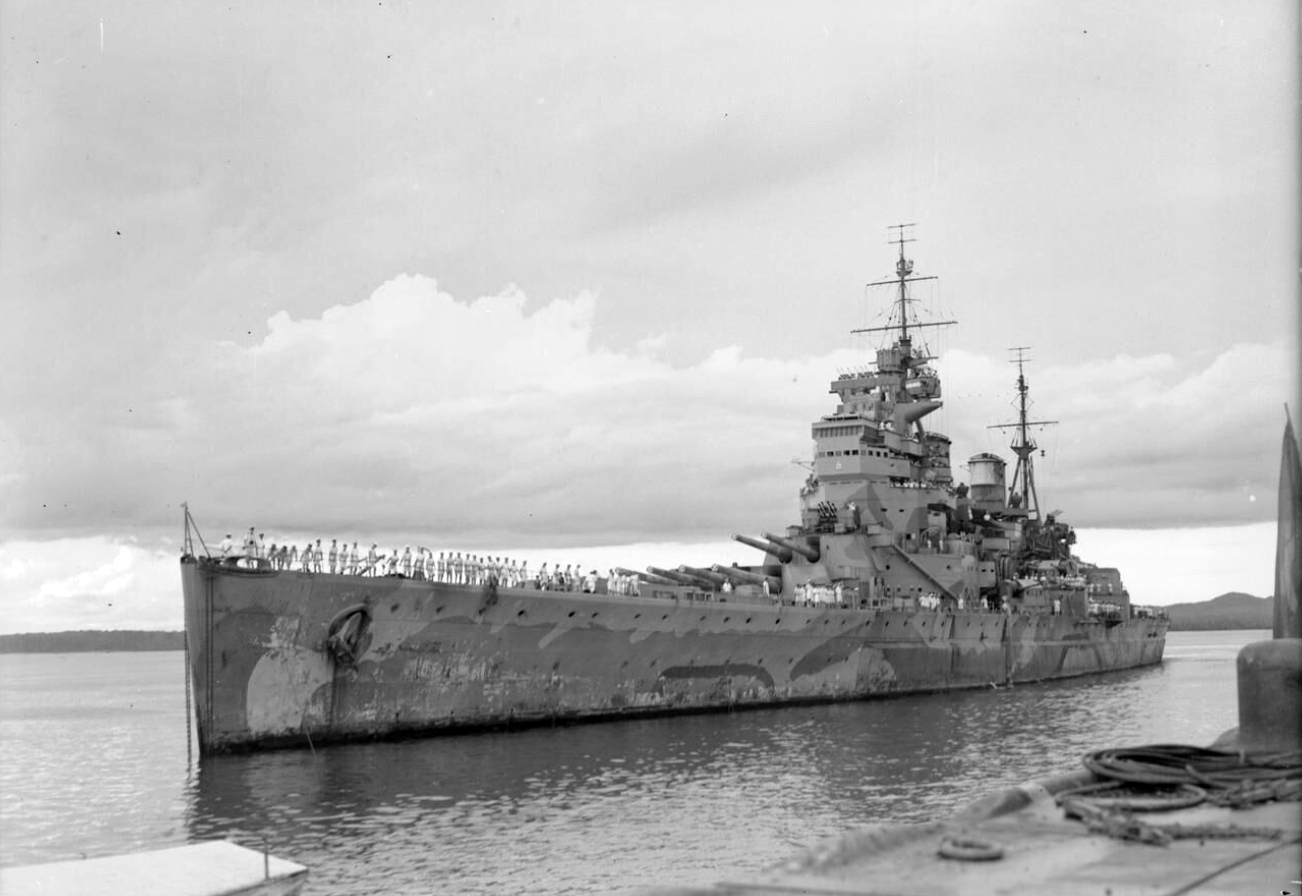
- Prince of Wales arrives at Singapore, 4 December 1941, six days before being sunk

History

United Kingdom
- Name: Prince of Wales
- Namesake: The title of Prince of Wales
- Ordered: 29 July 1936
- Builder: Cammell Laird, Birkenhead
- Laid down: 1 January 1937
- Launched: 3 May 1939
- Completed: 31 March 1941
- Commissioned: 19 January 1941
- Identification: Pennant number: 53
- Motto: "Ich Dien" – German: "I serve"
- Nickname(s): PoW
- Fate: Sunk by Japanese air attack, 10 December 1941
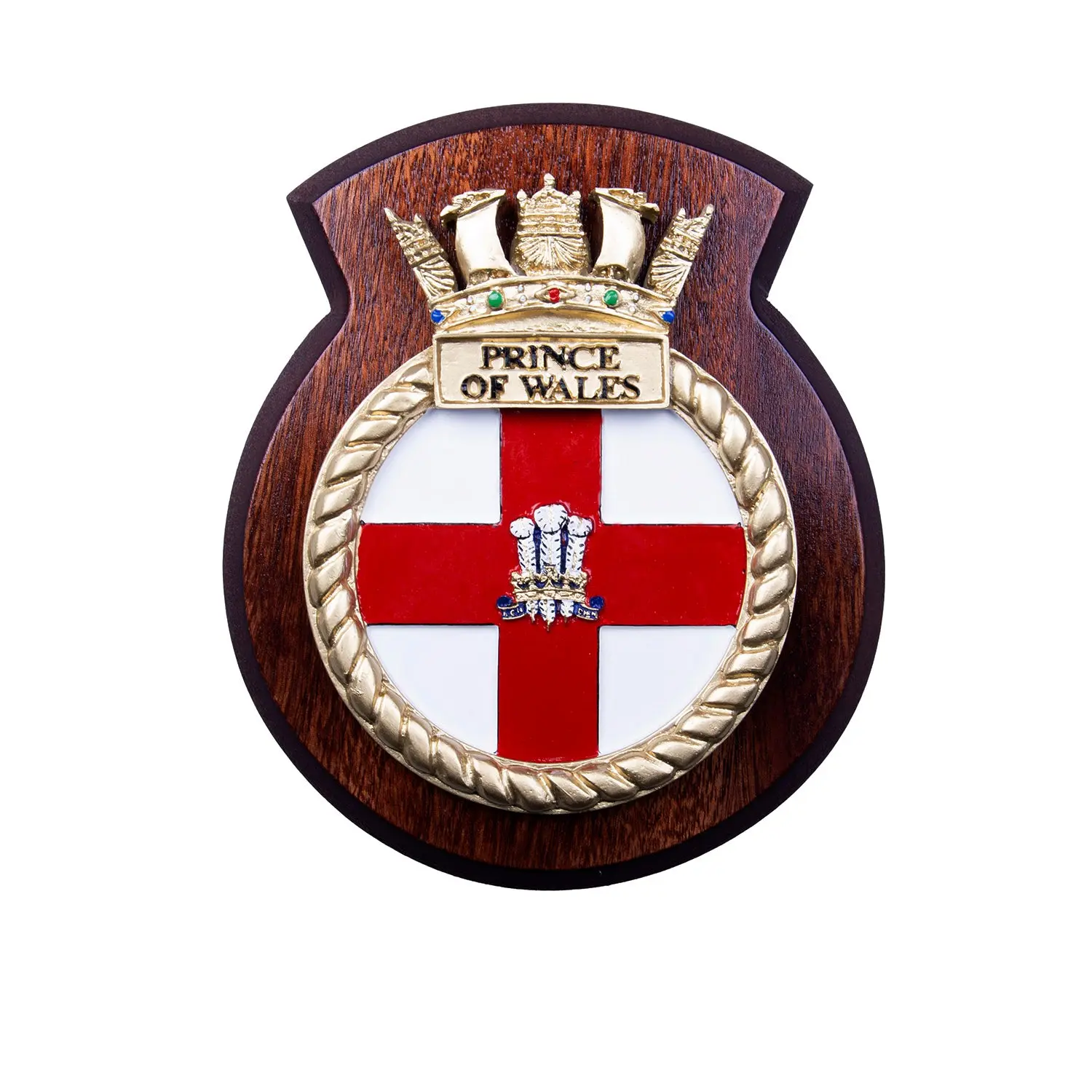
- Badge

General characteristics
- Class & type: King George V-class battleship
- Displacement: 43,786 long tons (44,489 t) (deep)
- Length: 745 ft 1 in (227.1 m) (overall)
- Beam: 103 ft 2 in (31.4 m)
- Draught: 34 ft 4 in (10.5 m)
- Installed power: 8 Admiralty 3-drum boilers; 110,000 shp (82,000 kW)
- Propulsion: 4 shafts; 4 sets geared turbines
- Speed: 28.3 knots (52.4 km/h; 32.6 mph)
- Range: 15,600 nmi (28,900 km; 18,000 mi) at 10 knots (19 km/h; 12 mph)
- Complement: 1,521 (1941); 1,612 (December 1941)
- Sensors & processing systems: Type 279 radar added; Type 284 radar added; Radars added in May 1941; 4 × Type 282 and Type 285 radars added.; Radar added between June–July 1941; Type 271 radar added
- Armament: 2 × quadruple, 1 × twin 14 in (356 mm) guns; 8 × twin 5.25 in (133 mm) DP guns; 4 × octuple 2 pdr (40 mm (1.6 in)) AA guns; 3 × 20-barrel AA rockets (later replaced with 1 × octuple and 1 × quadruple 2 pdrs); 1 × 40 mm Bofors
- Armour: Belt: 5.4–14.7 in (140–370 mm); Deck: 5–6 in (127–152 mm); Main gun turrets: 12.75 in (324 mm); Barbettes: 12.75 in (324 mm)
- Aircraft carried: 4 Supermarine Walrus seaplanes
- Aviation facilities: 1 × catapult

HMS Prince of Wales was a King George V-class battleship of the Royal Navy that was built at the Cammell Laird shipyard in Birkenhead. Despite being sunk less than a year after she was commissioned, Prince of Wales had an extensive battle history, first seeing action in August 1940 while still being outfitted in her drydock, when she was attacked and damaged by German aircraft. In her brief career, she was involved in several key actions of the Second World War, including the May 1941 Battle of the Denmark Strait, where she scored three hits on the German battleship Bismarck, forcing Bismarck to abandon her raiding mission and head to port for repairs. Prince of Wales later escorted one of the Malta convoys in the Mediterranean, during which she was attacked by Italian aircraft. In her final action, she attempted to intercept Japanese troop convoys off the coast of Malaya as part of Force Z when she was sunk by Japanese aircraft on 10 December 1941, three days after the attack on Pearl Harbor.

She was sunk alongside her consort, the battlecruiser HMS Repulse, in an attack by 85 Mitsubishi G3M and G4M bombers of the Japanese navy air service. Prince of Wales and Repulse became the first capital ships to be sunk solely by air power on the open sea, a harbinger of the diminishing role this class of ships was subsequently to play in naval warfare. The wreck of Prince of Wales lies upside down in 223 feet (68 m) of water, near Kuantan, in the South China Sea.

== Construction ==
In the aftermath of the First World War, the Washington Naval Treaty was drawn up in 1922 in an effort to stop an arms race developing between Britain, Japan, France, Italy and the United States. This treaty limited the number of ships each nation was allowed to build and capped the tonnage of all capital ships at 35,000 tons. These restrictions were extended in 1930 through the Treaty of London, however, by the mid-1930s Japan and Italy had withdrawn from both of these treaties, and the British became concerned about a lack of modern battleships within their navy. As a result, the Admiralty ordered the construction of a new battleship class: the King George V class. Due to the provisions of both the Washington Naval Treaty and the Treaty of London, both of which were still in effect when the King George Vs were being designed, the main armament of the class was limited to the 14-inch (356 mm) guns prescribed under these instruments. They were the only battleships built at that time to adhere to the treaty, and even though it soon became apparent to the British that the other signatories to the treaty were ignoring its requirements, it was too late to change the design of the class before they were laid down in 1937.

Prince of Wales was originally to be named King Edward VIII but upon the abdication of Edward VIII the ship was renamed at Cammell Laird's shipyard in Birkenhead on 1 January 1937, before being laid down. She was launched on 3 May 1939. She was still fitting out when war was declared in September, causing her construction schedule, and that of her sister, King George V, to be accelerated. Nevertheless, the late delivery of gun mountings caused delays in her outfitting.

In early August 1940, while she was still being outfitted and was in a semi-complete state, Prince of Wales was attacked by German aircraft. One bomb fell between the ship and a wet basin wall, narrowly missing a 100-ton dockside crane, and exploded underwater below the bilge keel, about six feet from the ship's port side in the vicinity of the aft group of 5.25-inch guns. The shell plating buckled over a distance of 20 to 30 feet (6.1 to 9.1 m), rivets were sprung and there was considerable flooding in the port outboard compartments in the area of damage, causing a ten-degree list to port. The flooding was severe, because final compartment air tests had not yet been made and the ship did not have her pumping system in operation.

The water was pumped out through the joint efforts of a local fire company and the shipyard, and Prince of Wales was later dry-docked for permanent repairs. This damage and the problem with the delivery of her main guns and turrets delayed her completion. As the war progressed there was an urgent need for capital ships, and so her completion was advanced by postponing compartment air tests, ventilation tests and thorough testing of her bilge, ballast and fuel-oil systems.

== Description ==
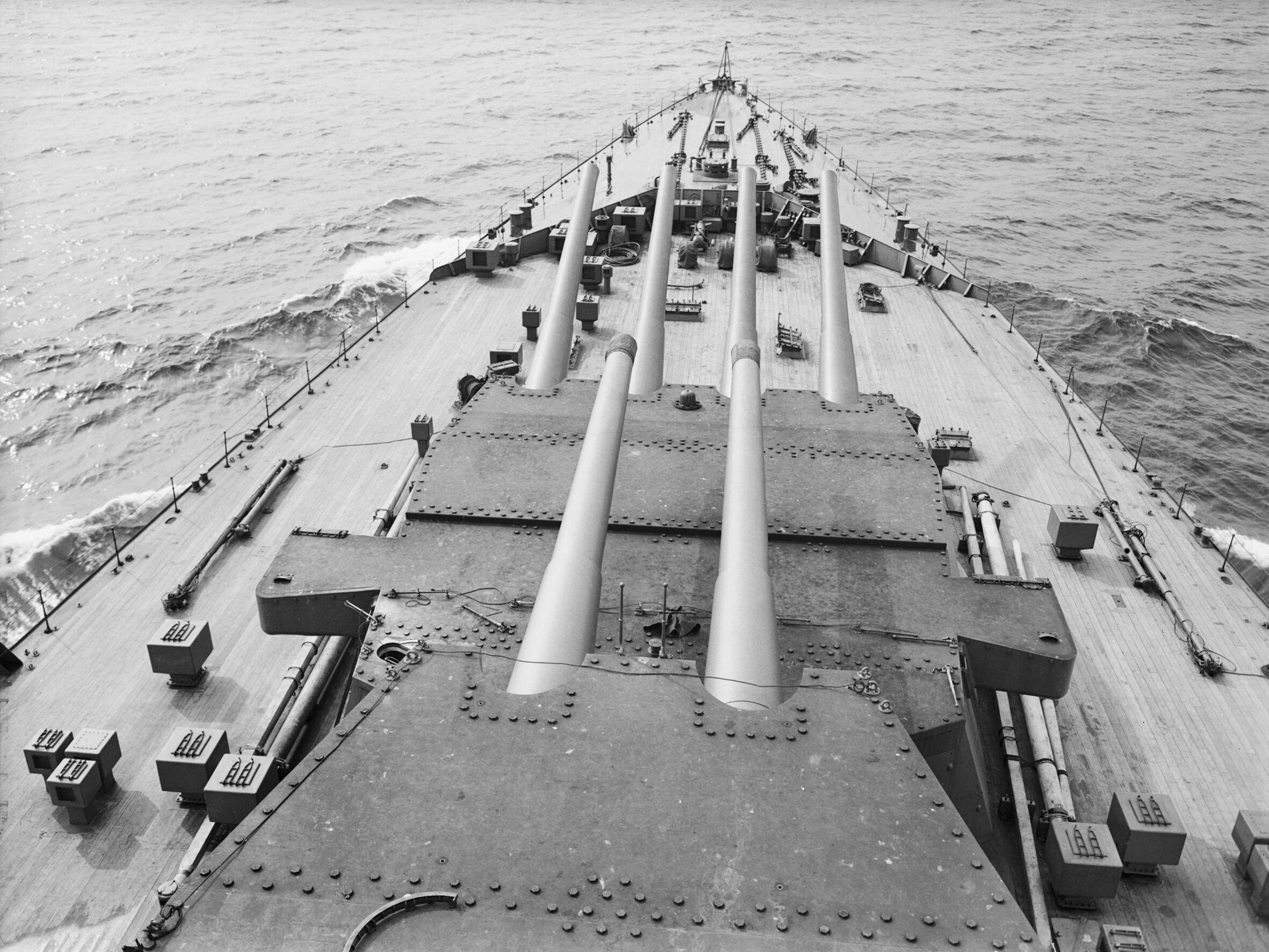
Bridge view of Prince of Wales's forecastle while the ship is underway.

Prince of Wales displaced 36,727 long tons (37,300 t) as built and 43,786 long tons (44,500 t) fully loaded. The ship had an overall length of 745 feet (227.1 m), a beam of 103 feet (31.4 m) and a draught of 29 feet (8.8 m). Her designed metacentric height was 6 feet 1 inch (1.85 m) at normal load and 8 feet 1 inch (2.46 m) at deep load.

She was powered by Parsons geared steam turbines, driving four propeller shafts. Steam was provided by eight Admiralty boilers which normally delivered 100,000 shaft horsepower (75,000 kW), but could deliver 110,000 shp (82,000 kW) with forced draft, (Note: The King George V-class battleships had their steam plant specifications revised during the building phase, and as built the ships actually produced 110,000 shp at 230 rpm, and were designed for an overload power of 125,000 shp, which was exceeded in service.) for a top speed of 28 knots (52 km/h; 32 mph). The ship carried 3,542 long tons (3,600 t) of fuel oil, 180 long tons (200 t) of diesel oil, 256 long tons (300 t) of reserve feed water and 444 long tons (500 t) of freshwater. During full-power trials on 31 March 1941, Prince of Wales at 42,100 tons displacement achieved 28 knots with 111,600 shp at 228 rpm and a specific fuel consumption of 0.73 lb per shp. Prince of Wales had a range of 3,100 nautical miles (5,700 km; 3,600 mi) at 27 knots (50 km/h; 31 mph).

=== Armament ===
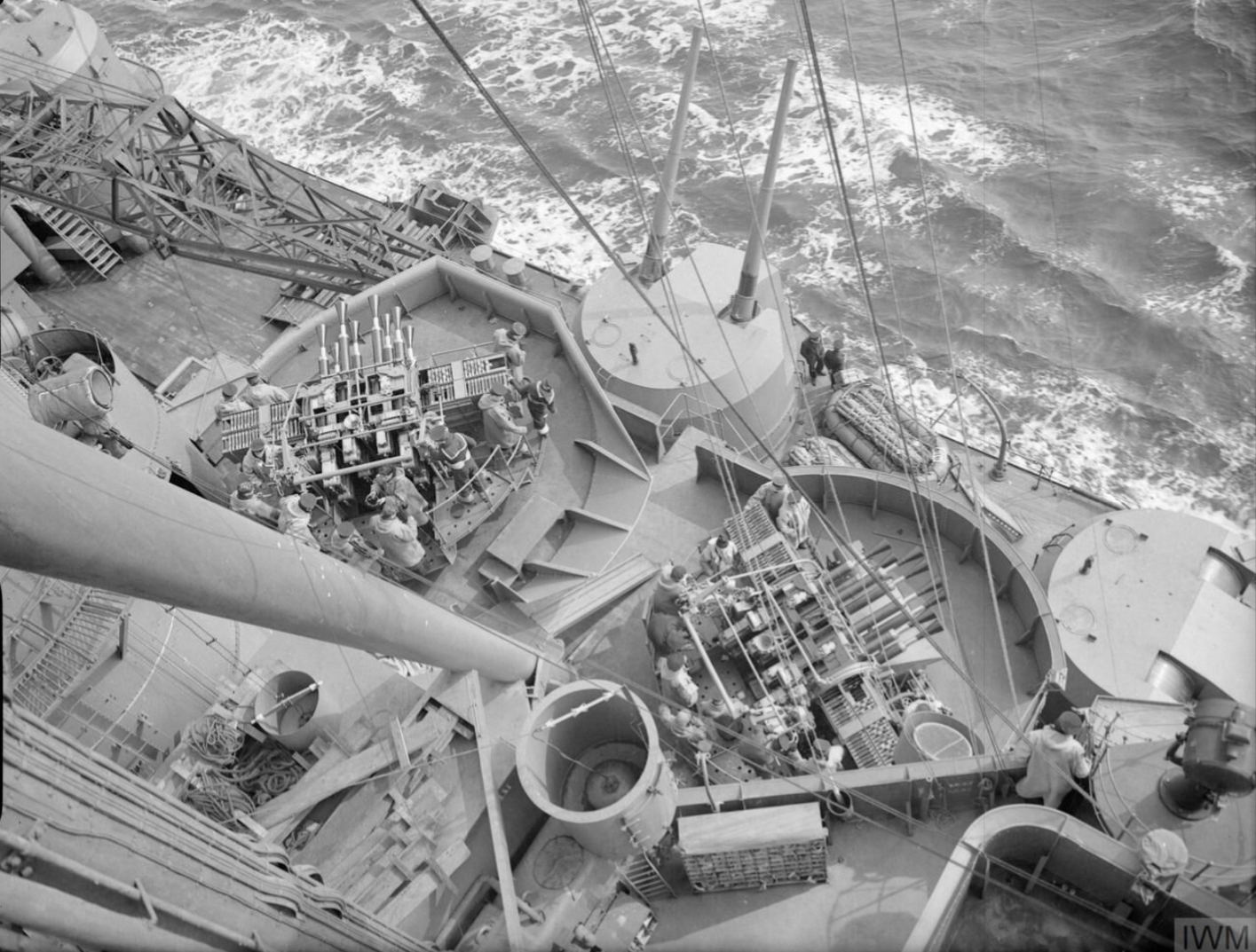
A part of Prince of Wales's anti-aircraft armament: two of the eight-barreled two-pounder pom-poms and two of the twin 5.25 inch gun turrets.

Prince of Wales mounted 10 BL 14-inch (356 mm) Mk VII guns, mounted in one Mark II twin turret forward and two Mark III quadruple turrets, one forward and one aft. The guns could be elevated 40 degrees and depressed 3 degrees. Training arcs were: turret "A", 286 degrees; turret "B", 270 degrees; turret "Y", 270 degrees. Training and elevating was done by hydraulic drives, with rates of two and eight degrees per second, respectively. A full gun broadside weighed 15,950 pounds (7,230 kg), and a salvo could be fired every 40 seconds. The secondary armament consisted of 16 QF 5.25-inch (133 mm) Mk I guns mounted in eight twin mounts, weighing 81 tons each. The maximum range of the Mk I guns was 24,070 yards (22,009.6 m) at a 45-degree elevation, the anti-aircraft ceiling was 49,000 feet (14,935.2 m). The guns could be elevated to 70 degrees and depressed to 5 degrees. The normal rate of fire was ten to twelve rounds per minute, but in practice, the guns could only fire seven to eight rounds per minute. Prince of Wales also carried 32 QF 2 pdr (1.575-inch, 40.0 mm) Mk.VIII "pom-pom" anti-aircraft guns and 80 UP projectors, short-range rocket-firing anti-aircraft weapons used in the early days of the Second World War by the Royal Navy.

== Operational service ==
=== Action with Bismarck ===
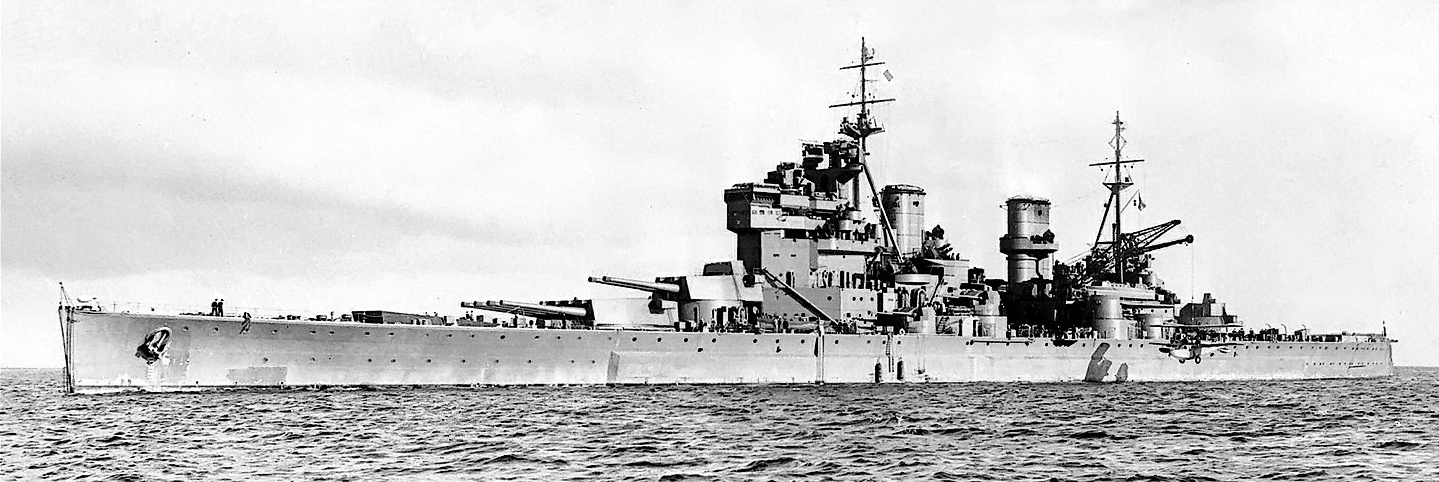
Prince of Wales shortly after she was commissioned, lowering a Supermarine Walrus flying boat over her side.

On 22 May 1941, Prince of Wales, the battlecruiser Hood and six destroyers were ordered to take station south of Iceland and intercept the German battleship Bismarck if she attempted a breakout into the Atlantic. Captain John Leach was aware that main battery breakdowns were expected, as Vickers-Armstrongs technicians had already rectified several that had occurred during training exercises in Scapa Flow. The technicians were retained aboard at the captain's request and played a significant role during the subsequent action.

The next day Bismarck, in company with the heavy cruiser Prinz Eugen, was reported heading south-westward in the Denmark Strait. At 20:00 Vice-Admiral Lancelot Holland, in his flagship Hood, ordered the force to steam at 27 knots (50 km/h), which it did most of the night. His battle plan called for Prince of Wales and Hood to concentrate on Bismarck, while the cruisers Norfolk and Suffolk would handle Prinz Eugen. However the two cruisers were not informed of this plan because of strict radio silence. At 02:00, on 24 May, the destroyers were sent as a screen to search for the German ships to the north, and at 02:47 Hood and Prince of Wales increased speed to 28 knots (52 km/h) and changed course slightly to obtain a better target angle on the German ships. The weather improved, with 10-mile (16 km) visibility, and crews were at action stations by 05:10.

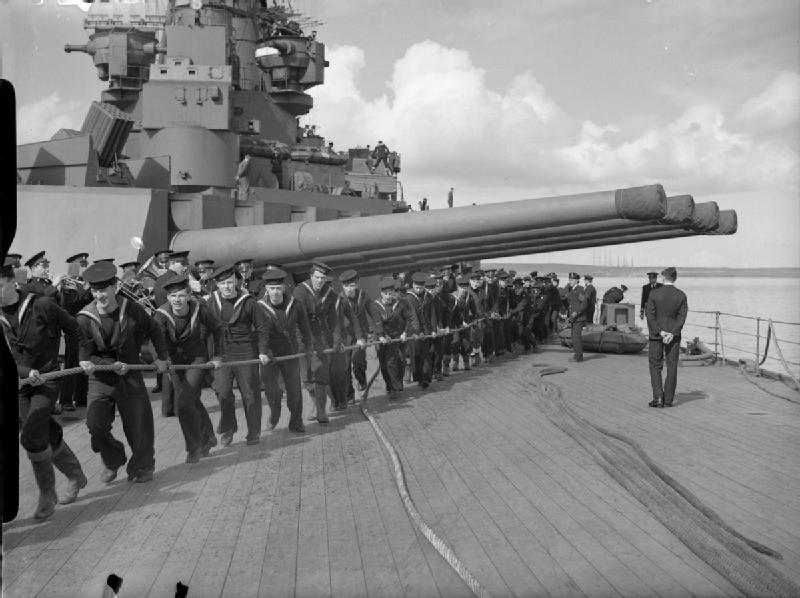
Sailors aboard the Prince of Wales under four 14-inch guns

At 05:37 an enemy contact report was made, and course was changed to starboard to close range. Neither ship was in good fighting trim. Hood, designed twenty-five years earlier, lacked adequate decking armour and would have to close the range quickly, as she would become progressively less vulnerable to plunging shellfire at shorter ranges. She had completed an overhaul in March and her crew had not been fully retrained. Prince of Wales, with thicker armour, was less vulnerable to 15-inch shells at ranges greater than 17,000 feet (5,200 m), but her crew had also not been trained to battle efficiency. The British ships made their last course change at 05:49, but they had made their approach too fine (the German ships were only 30 degrees on the starboard bow) and their aft turrets could not fire. Prinz Eugen, with Bismarck astern, had Prince of Wales and Hood slightly forward of the beam, and both ships could deliver full broadsides.

At 05:53, despite seas breaking over the bows, Prince of Wales opened fire on Bismarck at 26,500 yards (24,200 m). There was some confusion among the British as to which ship was Bismarck and thirty seconds earlier Hood had mistakenly opened fire on Prinz Eugen as the German ships had similar profiles. Hood's first salvo straddled the enemy ship, but Prinz Eugen, in less than three minutes, scored 8-inch-shell hits on Hood. The first shots by Prince of Wales – two three-gun salvoes at ten-second intervals – were 1,000 yards over. The turret rangefinders on Prince of Wales could not be used because of spray over the bow and fire was instead directed from the 15-foot (4.6 m) rangefinders in the control tower.

The sixth, ninth and thirteenth salvos were straddles and two hits were made on Bismarck. One shell holed her bow and caused Bismarck to lose 1,000 tons of fuel oil, mostly to salt-water contamination. The other fell short, and entered Bismarck below her side armour belt, the shell exploded and flooded the auxiliary boiler machinery room and forced the shutdown of two boilers due to a slow leak in the boiler room immediately aft. The loss of fuel and boiler power were decisive factors in Bismarck's decision to return to port. In Prince of Wales, "A1" gun ceased fire after the first salvo due to a defect. Sporadic breakdowns occurred until the decision to turn away was made, and during the turn "Y" turret jammed.

Both German ships initially concentrated their fire on Hood and destroyed her with salvoes of 8- and 15-inch shells. An 8-inch shell hit the boat deck and struck a ready service locker for ammunition, and a fire blazed high above the first superstructure deck. At 05:58 at a range of 16,500 yards (15,100 m), the force commander ordered a turn of 20 degrees to port to open the range and bring the full battery of the British ships to bear on Bismarck. As the turn began, Bismarck straddled Hood with her third and fourth four-gun salvoes and at 06:01 the fifth salvo hit her, causing a large explosion. Flames shot up near Hood's masts, then an orange-coloured fireball and an enormous smoke cloud obliterated the ship. On Prince of Wales, it seemed that Hood collapsed amidships, and the bow and stern could be seen rising as she rapidly settled. Prince of Wales made a sharp starboard turn to avoid hitting the debris and in doing so further closed the range between her and the German ships. In the four-minute action, Hood, the largest battlecruiser in the world, had been sunk. 1,419 officers and men were killed. Only three men survived.

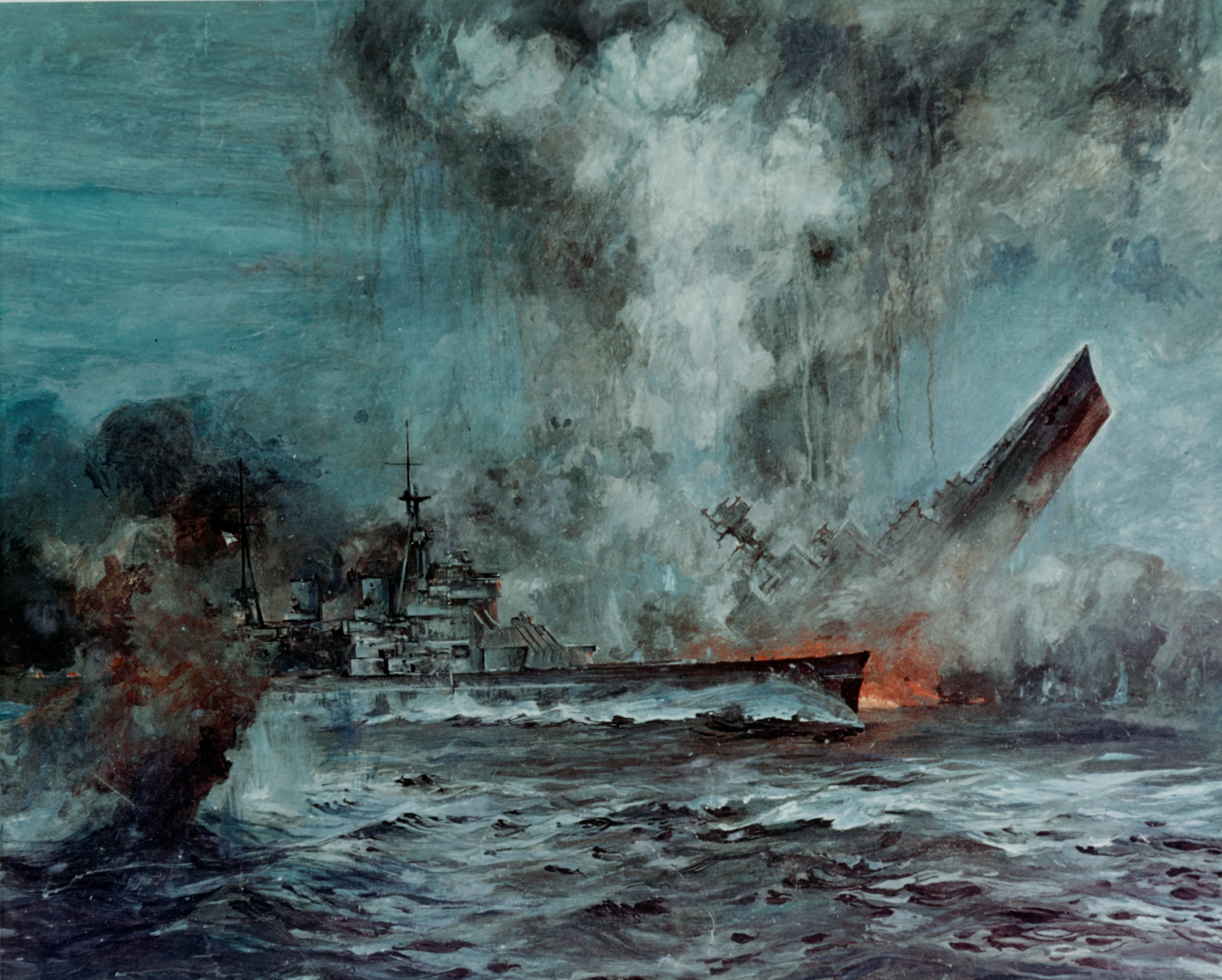
Painting by J.C. Schmitz-Westerholt, depicting Prince of Wales in the foreground manoeuvring past the sinking wreck of the Hood.

Prince of Wales fired unopposed until she began a port turn at 05:57, when Prinz Eugen took her under fire. After Hood exploded at 06:01, the Germans opened intense and accurate fire on Prince of Wales, with 15-inch, 8-inch and 5.9-inch guns. A heavy hit was sustained below the waterline as Prince of Wales manoeuvred past the wreckage of Hood. At 06:02, a 15-inch shell struck the starboard side of the compass platform and killed the majority of the personnel there. The navigating officer was wounded, but Captain Leach was unhurt. Casualties were caused by the fragments from the shell's ballistic cap and the material it dislodged in its diagonal path through the compass platform. A 15-inch diving shell penetrated the ship's side below the armour belt amidships, failed to explode and came to rest in the wing compartments on the starboard side of the after boiler rooms. The shell was discovered and defused when the ship was docked at Rosyth.

At 06:05 Captain Leach decided to disengage and laid down a heavy smokescreen to cover Prince of Wales's escape. Leach then radioed Norfolk that Hood had been sunk and went to join Suffolk 15 to 17 miles (24 to 27 km) astern of Bismarck. The British ships continued to chase Bismarck until 18:16 when Suffolk sighted the German battleship at 22,000 yards (20,000 m). Prince of Wales then opened fire on Bismarck at an extreme range of 30,300 yards (27,700 m). All 12 salvos missed. At 01:00 on 25 May Prince of Wales again regained contact and opened fire at a radar range of 20,000 yards (18,000 m), after observers believed that she had scored a hit on Bismarck, Prince of Wales's "A" turret temporarily jammed, leaving her with only six operational guns. After losing sight of Bismarck owing to poor visibility, and after searching for 12 hours, Prince of Wales headed for Iceland. Thirteen of her crew had been killed, and nine wounded.

On Friday 6 June, while in dry dock, a hole was found just above the starboard bilge keel. After the inner space had been pumped out, an unexploded shell from Bismarck was found nose forward, with its fuse, but without a ballistic cap. The shell was removed by the Bomb Disposal Officer from HMS Cochrane

=== Atlantic Charter meeting ===
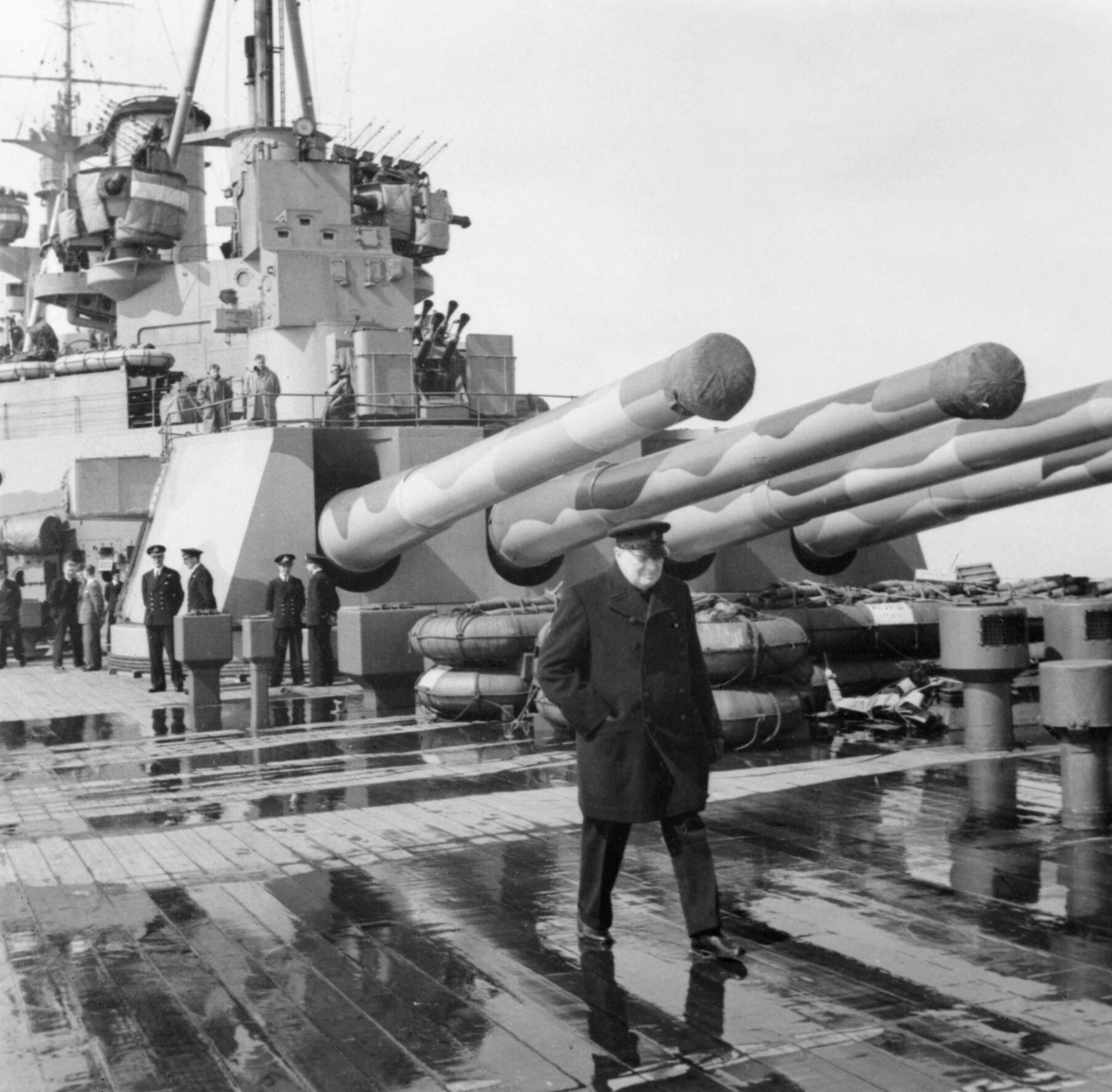
Prime Minister Winston Churchill on board Prince of Wales during his journey across the Atlantic to meet with President Roosevelt, 10–12 August 1941

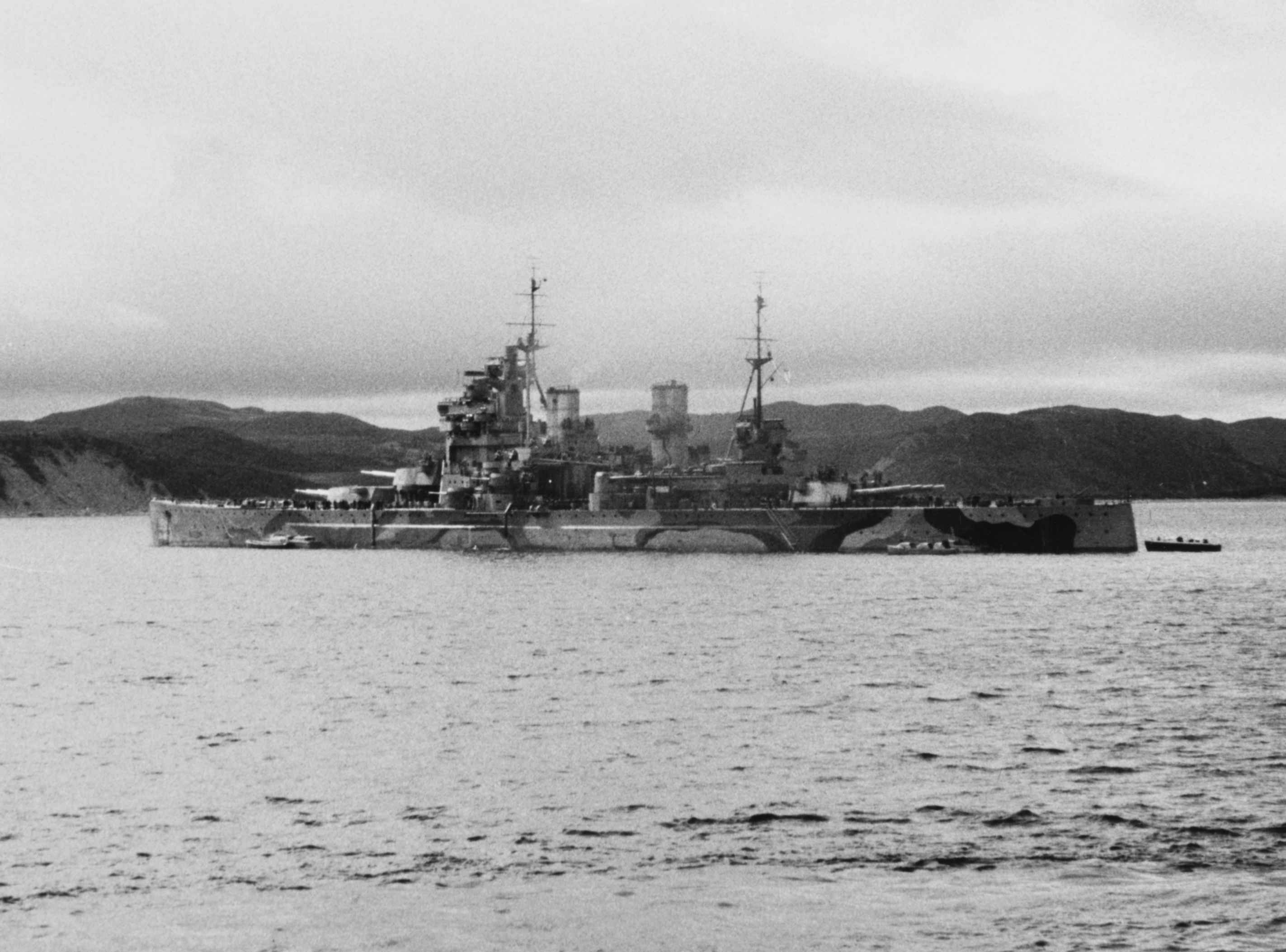
Prince of Wales off Newfoundland, after ferrying Churchill for the Atlantic Charter Conference

After repairs at Rosyth, Prince of Wales took Prime Minister Winston Churchill across the Atlantic for the secret Atlantic Conference (Codename: Riviera) with US President Franklin D. Roosevelt. On 5 August Roosevelt boarded the cruiser USS Augusta from the presidential yacht Potomac. Augusta proceeded from Massachusetts to Placentia Bay and Argentia in Newfoundland with the cruiser USS Tuscaloosa and five destroyers, arriving on 7 August while Potomac played a decoy role by continuing to cruise New England waters as if the president were still on board. On 9 August, Churchill arrived in the bay aboard Prince of Wales, escorted by the destroyers HMS Ripley, HMCS Assiniboine and HMCS Restigouche. At Placentia Bay, Newfoundland, Roosevelt transferred to the destroyer USS McDougal to meet Churchill on board Prince of Wales. The conference continued from 10 to 12 August aboard Augusta and, at the end of the conference, the Atlantic Charter was proclaimed. Prince of Wales arrived back at Scapa Flow on 18 August.

=== Mediterranean duty ===
In September 1941, Prince of Wales was assigned to Force H, in the Mediterranean. On 24 September Prince of Wales formed part of Group II, led by Vice-Admiral Alban Curteis and consisting of the battleships Prince of Wales and Rodney, the cruisers Kenya, Edinburgh, Sheffield and Euryalus, and twelve destroyers. The force provided an escort for Operation Halberd, a supply convoy from Gibraltar to Malta. On 27 September the convoy was attacked by Italian aircraft, with Prince of Wales shooting down several with her 5.25-inch (133 mm) guns. Later that day there were reports that units of the Italian Fleet were approaching. Prince of Wales, the battleship Rodney and the aircraft carrier Ark Royal were despatched to intercept, but the search proved fruitless. The convoy arrived in Malta without further incident, and Prince of Wales returned to Gibraltar, before sailing on to Scapa Flow, arriving there on 6 October.

=== Far East ===
Churchill had proposed sending one of the new King George V battleships to Asia as a deterrent to Japanese aggression, though Admiral of the Home Fleet Sir John Tovey was opposed believing that King George Vs were not suited to operating in tropical climates. On 25 October Prince of Wales and a destroyer escort left home waters bound for Singapore, there to rendezvous with the battlecruiser Repulse and the aircraft carrier Indomitable. Indomitable however ran aground off Jamaica a few days later and was unable to proceed. Calling at Freetown and Cape Town South Africa to refuel and generate publicity, Prince of Wales also stopped in Mauritius and the Maldive Islands. Prince of Wales reached Colombo, Ceylon, on 28 November, joining Repulse the next day. On 2 December the fleet docked in Singapore. Prince of Wales then became the flagship of Force Z, under the command of Admiral Sir Tom Phillips.

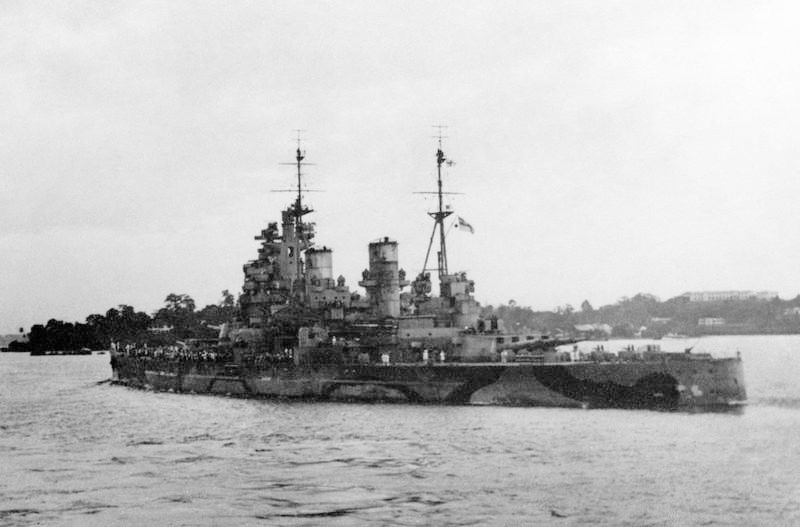
Prince of Wales departing Singapore to intercept Japanese transports approaching Malaya, 8 December 1941

Japanese troop-convoys were first sighted on 6 December. Two days later, Japanese aircraft raided Singapore; although the Prince of Wales's anti-aircraft batteries opened fire, they scored no hits and had no effect on the Japanese aircraft. A signal was received from the Admiralty in London ordering the British squadron to commence hostilities, and that evening, confident that a protective air umbrella would be provided by the RAF presence in the region, Admiral Phillips set sail. Force Z at this time comprised the battleship Prince of Wales, the battlecruiser Repulse, and the destroyers Electra, Express, Tenedos and HMAS Vampire.

The object of the sortie was to attack Japanese transports at Kota Bharu, but in the afternoon of 9 December the Japanese submarine I-65 spotted the British ships, and in the evening they were detected by Japanese aerial reconnaissance. By this time it had been made clear that no RAF fighter support would be forthcoming. At midnight a signal was received that Japanese forces were landing at Kuantan in Malaya. Force Z was diverted to investigate. At 02:11 on 10 December the force was again sighted by a Japanese submarine and at 08:00 arrived off Kuantan, only to discover that the reported landings were a diversion.

Prince of Wales in the first torpedo attack

At 11:00 that morning the first Japanese air attack began. Eight Type 96 "Nell" bombers dropped their bombs close to Repulse, one passing through the hangar roof and exploding on the 1-inch plating of the main deck below. The second attack force, comprising seventeen "Nells" armed with torpedoes, arrived at 11:30, divided into two attack formations. Despite reports to the contrary, Prince of Wales was struck by only one torpedo. Meanwhile, Repulse avoided the seven torpedoes aimed at her, as well as bombs dropped by six other "Nells" a few minutes later.

The torpedo struck Prince of Wales on the port side aft, abaft "Y" Turret, wrecking the outer propeller shaft on that side and destroying bulkheads to one degree or another along the shaft all the way to B Engine Room. This caused rapid uncontrollable flooding and put the entire electrical system in the after part of the ship out of action. Lacking effective damage control, she soon took on a heavy list.

A third torpedo attack developed against Repulse and once again she avoided taking any hits.

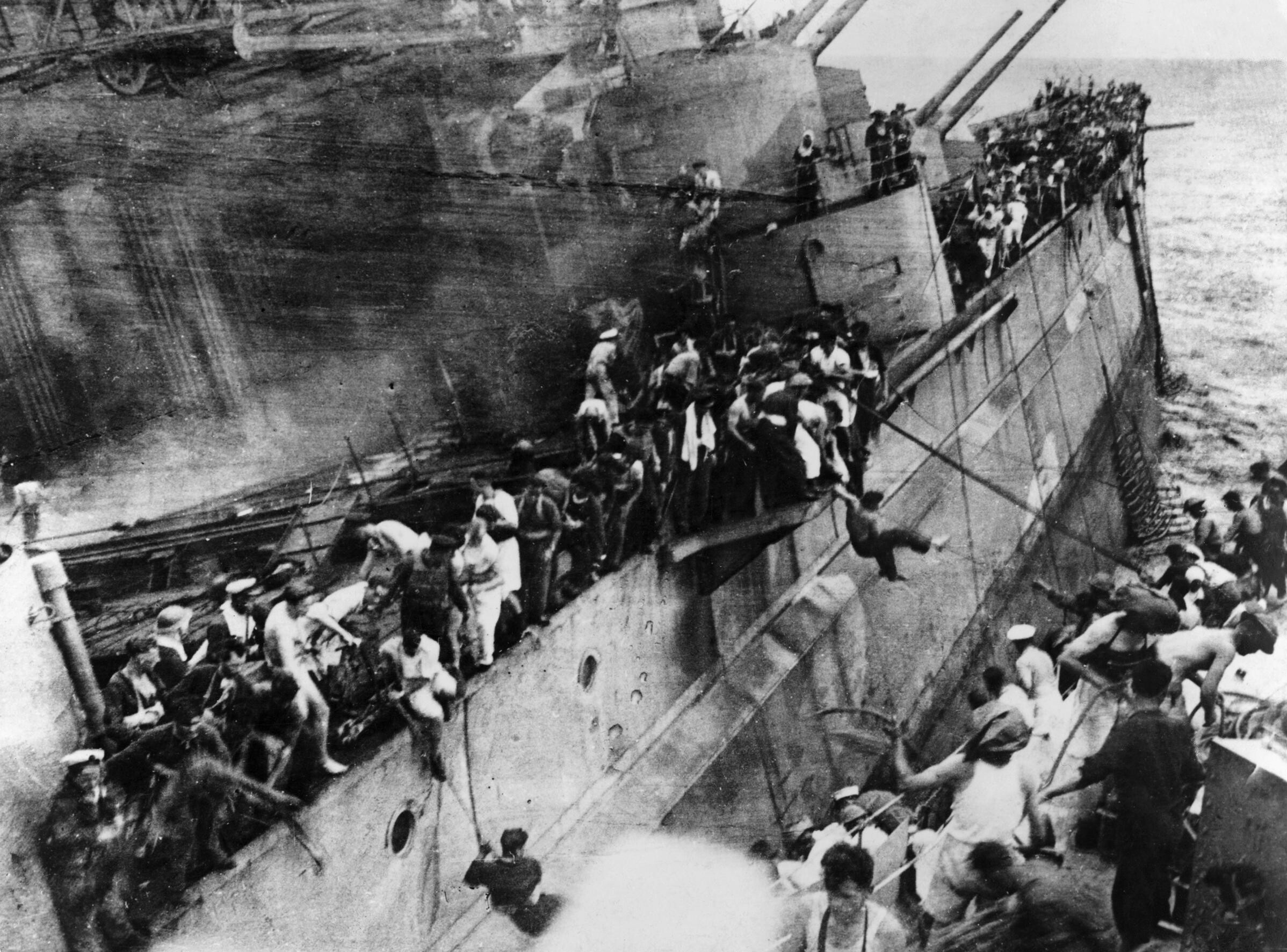
The crew of the sinking Prince of Wales abandoning ship to the destroyer Express

A fourth attack, conducted by torpedo-carrying Type 1 "Bettys", developed. This one scored hits on Repulse and she sank at 12:33. Six aircraft from this wave also attacked Prince of Wales, hitting her with three torpedoes, causing further damage and flooding. Finally, a 500-kilogram (1,100 lb) bomb hit Prince of Wales's catapult deck, penetrated to the main deck, where it exploded, causing many casualties in the makeshift aid centre in the Cinema Flat. Several other bombs from this attack scored very near misses, indenting the hull, popping rivets and causing hull plates to split along the seams and intensifying the flooding. At 13:15 the order to abandon ship was given, and at 13:20 Prince of Wales capsized to port, floated for a few brief moments upside down, and sank stern first; Admiral Phillips and Captain Leach were among the 327 fatalities, out of a complement of 1,612.

=== Aftermath ===
Prince of Wales and Repulse were the first capital ships to be sunk solely by naval air power on the open sea (albeit by land-based rather than carrier-based aircraft), a harbinger of the diminishing role this class of ships was to play in naval warfare thereafter. It is often pointed out, however, that contributing factors to the sinking of Prince of Wales were her surface-scanning radars being inoperable in the humid tropic climate, depriving Force Z of one of its most potent early-warning devices, and the critical early damage she sustained from the first torpedo. Another factor which led to Prince of Wales's demise was the loss of her dynamos, depriving Prince of Wales of many of her electric pumps. Further electrical failures left parts of the ship in total darkness, and added to the difficulties of her damage repair parties as they attempted to counter the flooding. The sinking was the subject of an inquiry chaired by Mr. Justice Bucknill, but the true causes of the ship's loss were only established when divers examined the wreck after the war. The Director of Naval Construction's report on the sinking claimed that the ship's anti-aircraft guns could have inflicted heavy casualties before torpedoes were dropped, if not preventing the successful conclusion of attack had crews been more adequately trained in their operation.

=== The wreck ===
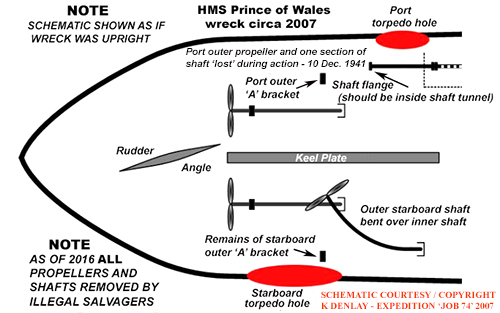
A schematic of the torpedo damage to the stern of HMS Prince of Wales, 10 December 1941 is shown as if the ship was upright (that is, the wreck is upside down and this image is sometimes seen 'reversed').

The wreck lies upside down in 223 feet (68 m) of water at 3°33′36″N 104°28′42″E.

A Royal Navy White Ensign attached to a line on a buoy tied to a propeller shaft is periodically renewed. The wreck site was designated a 'Protected Place' in 2001 under the Protection of Military Remains Act 1986, just prior to the 60th anniversary of her sinking. The ship's bell was manually raised in 2002 by British technical divers with the permission of the Ministry of Defence and blessing of the Force Z Survivors Association. It was restored, then presented for display by First Sea Lord and Chief of Naval Staff, Admiral Sir Alan West, to the Merseyside Maritime Museum in Liverpool. The bell has been since moved to the National Museum of the Royal Navy at the Portsmouth Historic Dockyard for display in the Hear My Story Galleries.

In May 2007, Expedition 'Job 74', a dedicated survey of the exterior hull of both Prince of Wales and Repulse, was conducted. The expedition's findings sparked considerable interest among naval architects and marine engineers around the world; as they detailed the nature of the damage to Prince of Wales and the exact location and number of torpedo strike holes. Consequently, the findings contained in the initial expedition report and later supplementary reports were analysed by the SNAME (Society of Naval Architects and Marine Engineers) Marine Forensics Committee and a resultant paper was drawn up entitled Death of a Battleship: A Re-analysis of the Tragic Loss of HMS Prince of Wales, and was subsequently presented at a meeting of RINA (Royal Institution of Naval Architects) and IMarEST (Institute of Marine Engineering, Science & Technology) members in London in 2009 by Mr William Garzke. This report was also presented to the IMarEST, this time in New York, in 2011. However, in 2012 the original paper was updated and expanded (and renamed Death of a Battleship: The Loss of HMS Prince of Wales. A Marine Forensics Analysis of the Sinking) in light of a subsequent diver being able to penetrate deep into the port outer propeller shaft tunnel with a high-definition camera, taking photos along the entire length of the propeller shaft all the way to the aft bulkhead of 'B' Engine Room.

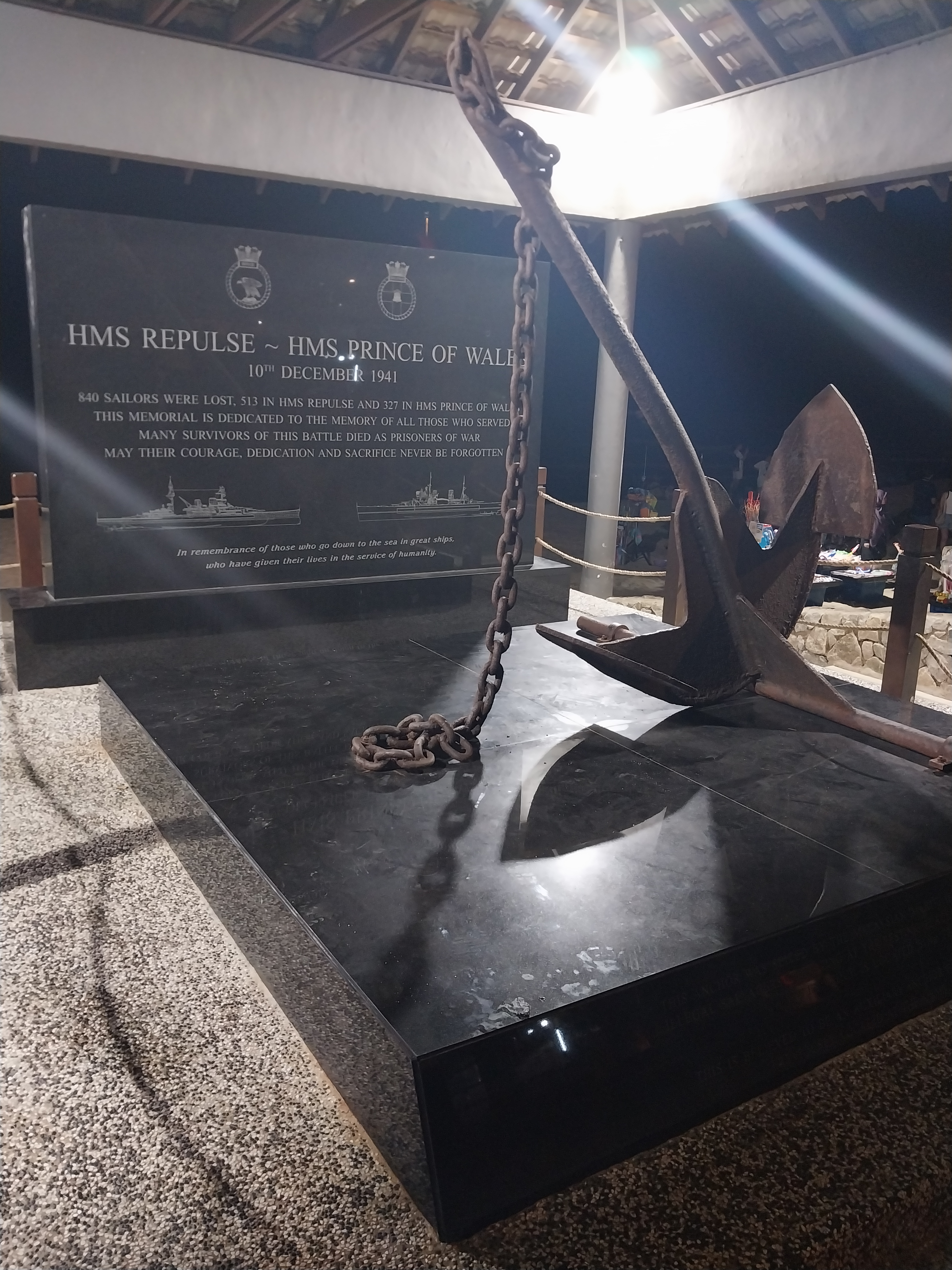
Memorial park of HMS Repulse and HMS Prince of Wales at Kuantan

In October 2014, the Daily Telegraph reported that both Prince of Wales and Repulse were being "extensively damaged" with explosives by scrap metal dealers. It is a tradition for passing Royal Navy ships to perform a remembrance service over the site of the wrecks. In May 2023, it was reported that a Chinese ship, Chuan Hong 68, illegally scavenged the wreck for its low-background steel. In July 2024, this same vessel, Chuan Hong 68, suspected of not only looting the wrecks of Force Z but other World War II wrecks in Asian waters, was back 'working' in the region and was subsequently detained by Malaysia authorities for 'paperwork violations'.

=== Replica bell for successor ===
In spring 2019, Cammell Laird was commissioned to make a replica of the ship's bell for the ship's successor, HMS Prince of Wales (R09), the second Queen Elizabeth-class aircraft carrier. The original at the National Museum of the Royal Navy's Portsmouth Historic Dockyard location was surveyed as part of the process. Cammell Laird were able to contact Utley Offshore in St Helens, the foundry that made the original bell and that of RMS Titanic, which still had the pattern based on the 1908 Admiralty design. Compared to the bronze or bell metal that is used in most modern ship bells, nickel silver was used for authenticity. The engraving was done by Shawcross in Birkenhead, while Cammell Laird shipwrights constructed the hardwood base. Cammell Laird COO Tony Graham presented the finished replica to commanding officer Captain Darren Houston during the ship's week-long visit to Liverpool in March 2020.

== Refits ==
During her career, Prince of Wales was refitted on several occasions, to bring her equipment up to date. The following are the dates and details of the refits undertaken.

Dates	Location	Description of Work
May 1941	Rosyth	4 × Type 282 radar and 4 × Type 285 radar added.
June–July 1941	Rosyth	UP projectors removed. 2 × 8-barrelled and 1 × 4-barrelled 2-pdr pom-poms added. Type 271 radar added.
November 1941	Cape Town	7 × single 20 mm added.
