= Double hull =

Ship hull design and construction method

Single hull, Double bottom, and Double hull ship cross sections. Green lines are watertight; black lines are not watertight

A double hull is a ship hull design and construction method where the bottom and sides of the ship have two complete layers of watertight hull surface: one outer layer forming the normal hull of the ship, and a second inner hull which is some distance inboard, typically by a few feet, which forms a redundant barrier to seawater in case the outer hull is damaged and leaks.

The space between the two hulls is sometimes used for storage of ballast water.

Double hulls are a more extensive safety measure than double bottoms, which have two hull layers only in the bottom of the ship but not the sides. In low-energy collisions, double hulls can prevent flooding beyond the penetrated compartment. In high-energy collisions, however, the distance to the inner hull is not sufficient and the inner compartment is penetrated as well.

Double hulls or double bottoms have been required in all passenger ships for decades as part of the Safety Of Life At Sea or SOLAS Convention.

== Uses ==
Double hulls are significantly safer than double bottoms, which in turn are safer than single bottoms. In case of grounding or other underwater damage, most of the time the damage is limited to flooding the bottom compartment, and the main occupied areas of the ship remain intact.

In low-energy collisions to the sides of the vessel, double hulls also prevent flooding beyond the penetrated compartment. In high-energy collisions, however, the distance to the inner hull is not sufficient and the inner compartment is penetrated as well.

A double bottom or hull also conveniently forms a stiff and strong girder or beam structure with the two hull plating layers as upper and lower plates for a composite beam. This greatly strengthens the hull in secondary hull bending and strength, and to some degree in primary hull bending and strength.

Double hulls can also:

- be used as inboard tanks to carry oil, ballast water or fresh water (ventilated by a gooseneck)
- help prevent pollution in case of liquid cargo (like oil in tankers)
- help to maintain stability of ship; and
- act as a platform for machinery and cargo.

== Oil tankers ==
Double hulls' ability to prevent or reduce oil spills led to double hulls being standardized for other types of ships including oil tankers by the International Convention for the Prevention of Pollution from Ships or MARPOL Convention. A double hull does not protect against major, high-energy collisions or groundings which cause the majority of oil pollution, despite this being the reason that the double hull was mandated by United States legislation. After the Exxon Valdez oil spill disaster, when that ship grounded on Bligh Reef outside the port of Valdez, Alaska, the US Government required all new oil tankers built for use between US ports to be equipped with a full double hull.

== Submarines ==
In submarine hulls, the double hull structure is significantly different, consisting of an outer light hull and inner pressure hull, with the outer hull intended more to provide a hydrodynamic shape for the submarine than the cylindrical inner pressure hull. It was introduced in the late 1890s by Maxime Laubeuf on the French submarine Narval. In addition to tailoring the flow of water around the submarine (also known as hydrodynamic bypass), this outer skin serves as a mounting point for anechoic tiles, which are designed specifically to absorb sound rather than reflect it, helping to hide the vessel from sonar detection.

== History ==
Leonardo da Vinci proposed the double-hulled ship design to protect against ramming and underwater damage from reefs or wreckage. Even if the outer hull was breached, the ship would remain afloat due to the second hull.

== See also ==
- Coulombi egg tanker
- Naval architecture
- Bulkhead
- Submarine
- Multihull
- Whipple shield
