= Hogging and sagging =

Shapes a beam deforms into when loads are applied

In solid mechanics, structural engineering, and shipbuilding, hogging and sagging describe the shape that a beam or similar long object will deform into when loading is applied. Hogging describes a beam that curves upwards in the middle, and sagging describes a beam that curves downwards.

== Ships ==
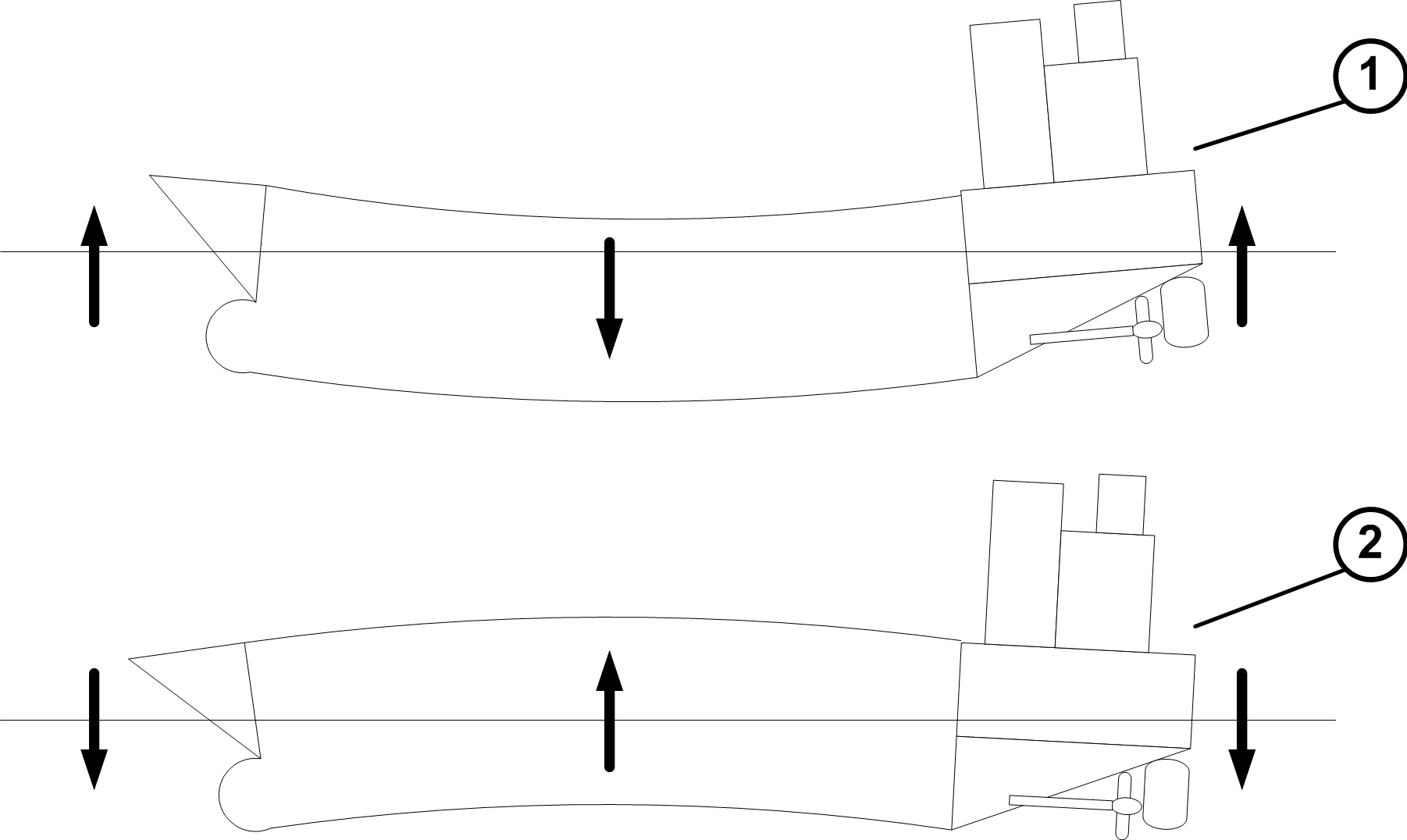
Diagram of ship's hull that is (1) sagging and (2) hogging under loads. Bending is exaggerated for illustrative purposes.

=== Dynamic stress ===
Hogging is the stress a ship's hull or keel experiences that causes the center or the keel to bend upward. Sagging is the stress a ship's hull or keel is placed under when the length of a wave is the same length as the ship and the ship is in the trough of two waves. This causes the middle of the ship to bend down slightly, and depending on the level of bend, may cause the hull to snap or crack.

Sagging or dynamic hogging may have been what sank the Prestige off Spain on 19 November 2002.

The 2013 loss of container ship MOL Comfort off the coast of Yemen was attributed to hogging. Subsequent lawsuits blamed the shipbuilder for design flaws.

=== Time-induced stress ===
Hogging, or "hog", also refers to the semi-permanent bend in the keel, especially in wooden-hulled ships, caused over time by the ship's center's being more buoyant than the bow or stern. At the beginning of her 1992 refit, USS Constitution had over 13 inches (33 cm) of hog. The keel blocks in the drydock were set up especially to support this curve. During her three years in drydock, the center keel blocks were gradually shortened, allowing the hog to settle out. Additionally, the diagonal riders specified in her original design to resist hogging, which had been removed in an earlier refit, were restored. The similar-sized USS Constellation had 36 inches (91 cm) of hog before refitting in the mid-1990s.

=== Cargo loading ===
During loading and discharging cargo, ships bend (hog or sag) due to the distribution of the weights in the various holds and tanks on board.

The maximum amount of cargo that a vessel can load often depends on whether her Plimsoll mark is submerged or not. Therefore, sagging can reduce her effective cargo capacity – especially if her loadline has already been reached prematurely due to the sag. This is taken into account when calculating cargo, by applying what is called a "3/4 mean draft". This method is also called the "two-thirds mean correction", directly derived from Simpson's first rule.

== Structural beams ==
In building construction, the sagging of beams is called "deflection". The amount of deflection varies in accordance with the beam's stiffness, the span between supports, and the load it carries. Sagging is a common problem in older houses.

== See also ==
- Glossary of nautical terms (disambiguation)
- Hog chains
- Strength of ships
