= Hog chains =

Wire trusses to prevent hogging on river steamboats

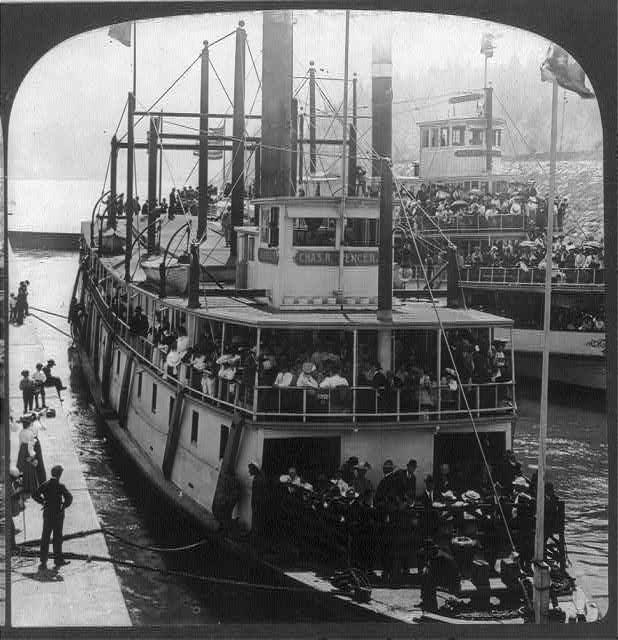
Hog-chains supported on hog posts rising above the cabins on Columbia River steamer Charles R. Spencer, in 1896.

Hog chains were a technological device that permitted river boats to have lightly built hulls so they could travel in shallow water.

== Engineering problem ==
It was advantageous for river vessels to operate in very shallow water, so that work could be done at all seasons and in areas that lacked deeper rivers. This required flat-bottomed boats with lightly built hulls. However, the hulls tended to bend out of shape over time, particularly with sternwheelers, which had heavy components at stern (the sternwheel) and also towards the bow (the boilers). If the boat hull became bowed upwards in the middle, this was called "hogging". If the boat bowed down in the middle, this was called "sagging".

== Description ==
To forestall hogging and sagging, since about 1850, the hulls of wooden river boats were held in shape by a system of wire trusses, called "hog chains". These were not chains at all, but rather iron rods 1 to 2.5 inches (25 to 64 mm) in diameter, which ran from strong points in the hull to vertical timbers, called "hog posts", which looked like masts, rising above the hull. Tension on the hog chains was adjusted through the use of turnbuckles. Generally the hog posts which carried the chains did not rise above the cabins on Mississippi River–style steamers. This was not the case with steamboats designed in the Pacific Northwest style, where the hogposts were often clearly visible rising above the superstructure.

== Consequences of failure ==
Should the hog-chains break, the hull would come out of tension, and start sagging on the ends. This was called being "hogged". In some cases the sagging on the ends would be so great that a boat's hull would break in half. Accidents such as running aground were the kind of things that could cause hog-chains to break.
