= Shell plating =

Outermost structure of a steel or aluminium ship's hull

Shell plating is the outer-most structure on the hull of a steel or aluminum ship or boat.

== Strakes ==
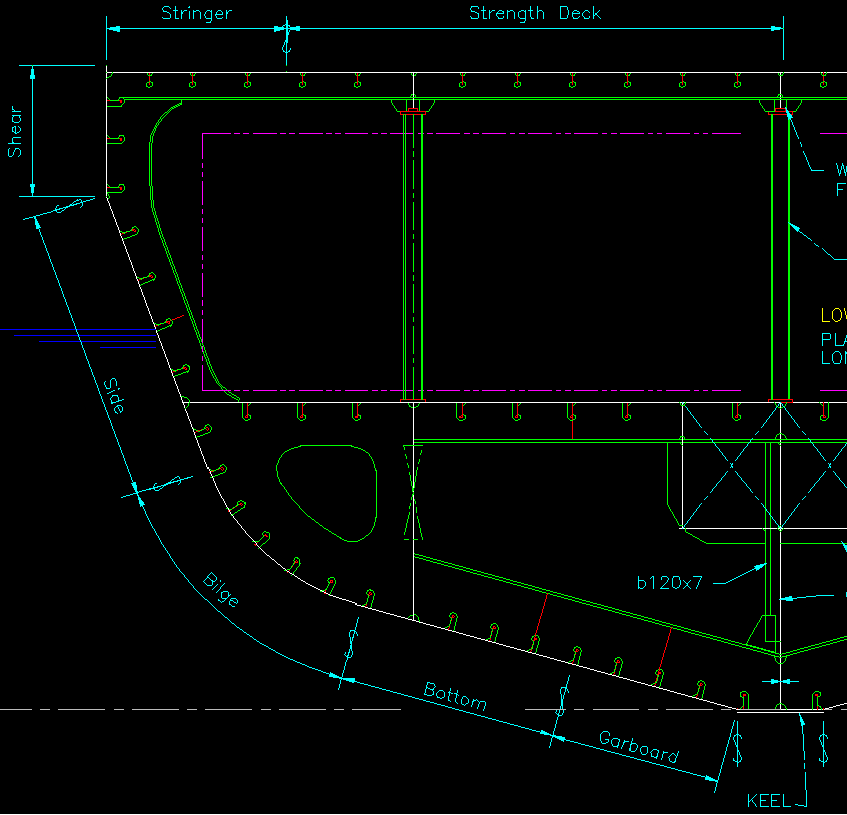
An autoCAD drawing of the various plating strakes on a convention hull.

A strake is the name given to each line of planking in a wooden vessel. In modern ship construction it refers to the longitudinal run of plating covering the hull, deck and bulkhead structure. Certain specific strakes are uniquely identified:

Keel: is a special strake of the Bottom plating extending from the centerplane outboard.

Bottom: the Bottom Shell plate strakes extend from the Keel to the Bilge.

Bilge: is the plating which transitions from the more-or-less horizontal Bottom Shell to the more-or-less vertical Side Shell and is generally curved. See also Chine (boating).

Side: is the plating which extends from the Bilge strake(s) to the Shear strake.

Shear: is a special strake of the Side plating. It is the strake that connects the Side Shell to the Strength Deck.

Stringer: is a special strake of the Strength Deck plating. It is the strake that connects the Strength Deck to the Side Shell.

Strength Deck: is a special deck. It is normally the uppermost continuous deck and forms the top flange of the hull girder.

== See also ==
- Strength of ships
- Hull (watercraft)
- Naval architecture
