= Safehull =

Software

Safehull is a software package developed by the ABS in September 1993. It enables the design and evaluation of ship structures, thanks to finite element analysis tools. Possible analyses include:

- Dynamic load determination
- Fatigue analysis

== Users ==
This software is used by Harland and Wolff Heavy Industries and Viking Systems (a ship structural design company), among others.
