= Naval architecture =

Engineering discipline of marine vessels

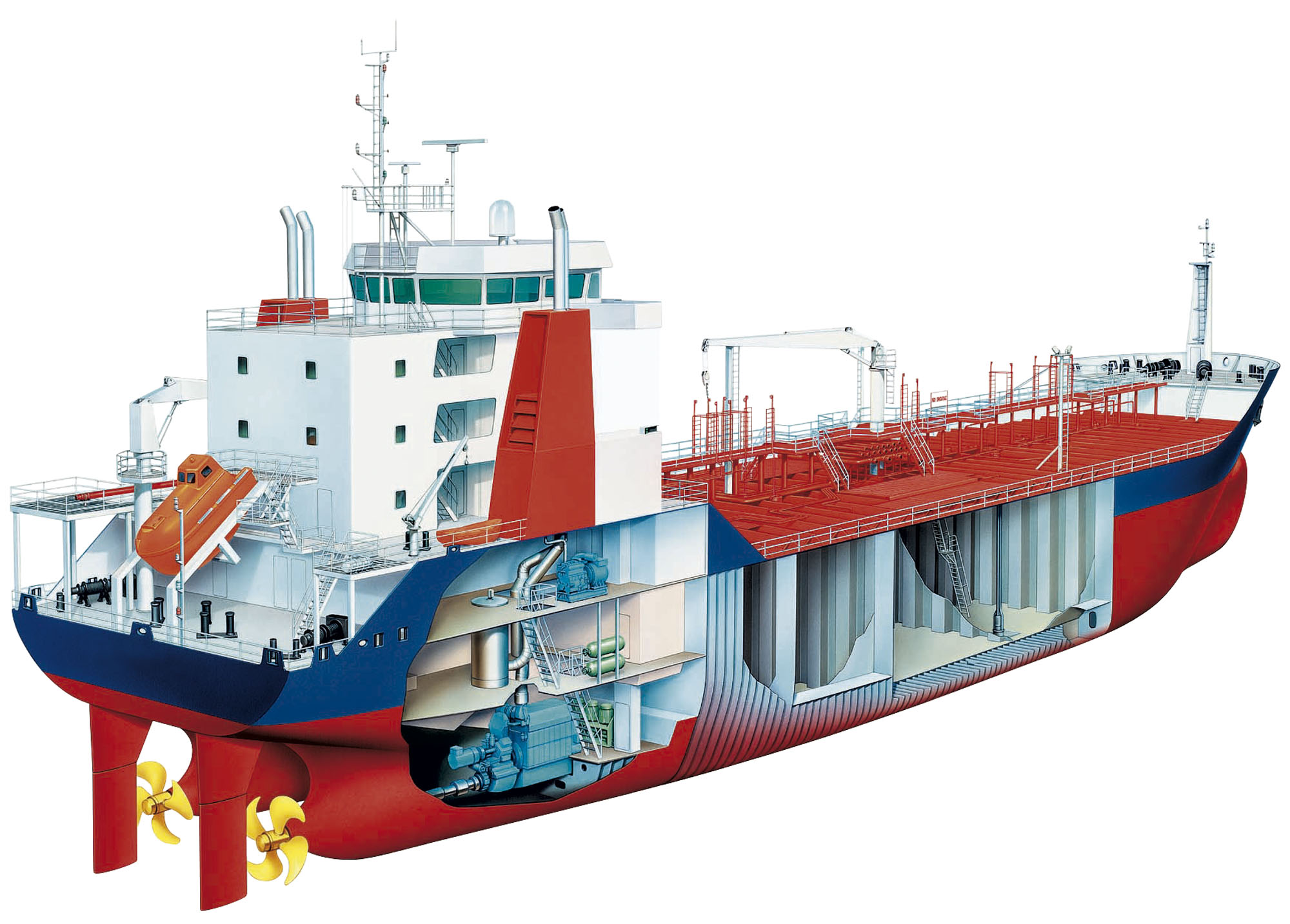
Cutaway drawing of a tanker ship

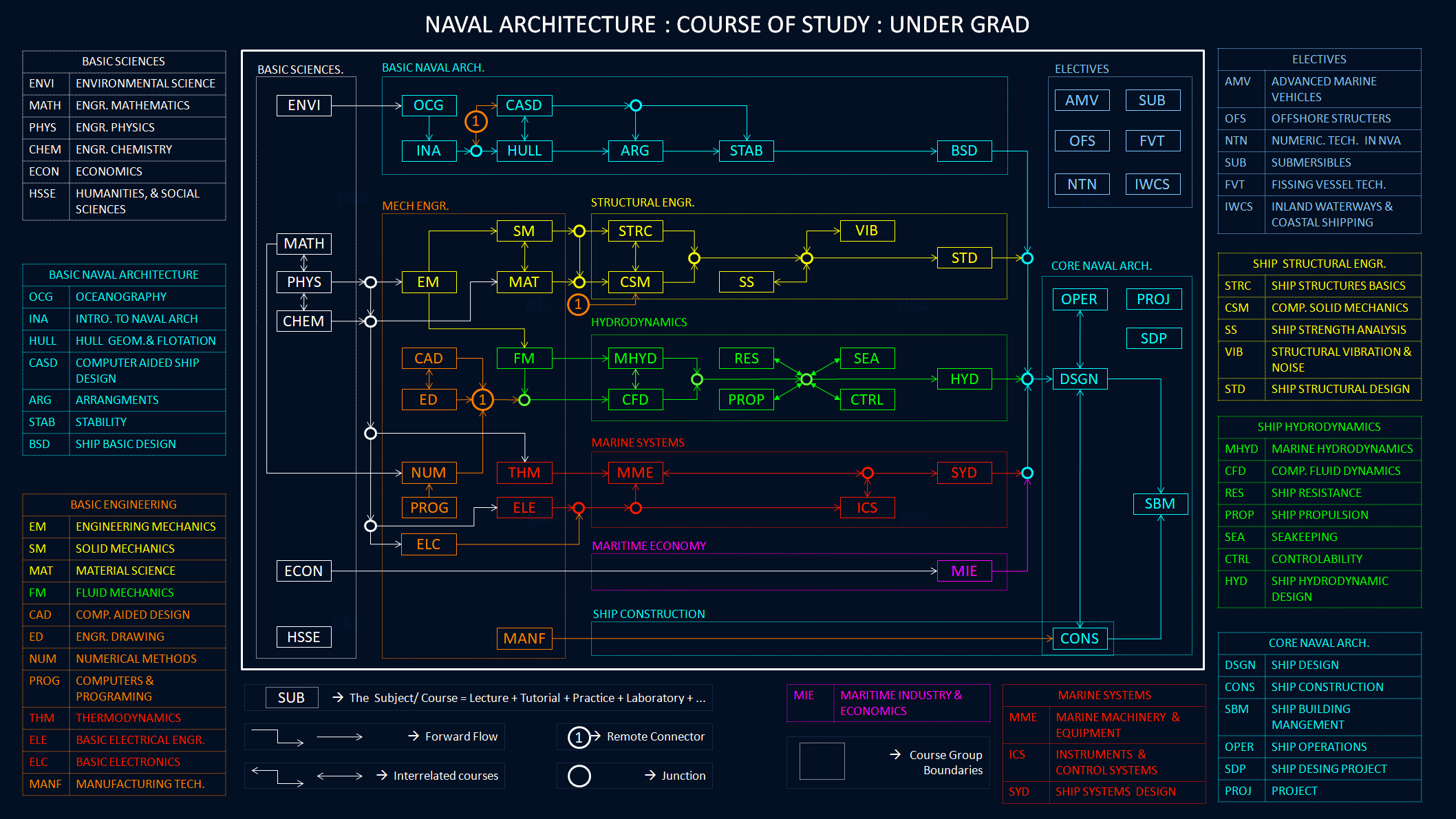
General Course of Study leading to Naval Architecture degree

Naval architecture, or naval engineering, is an engineering discipline incorporating elements of mechanical, electrical, electronic, software, and safety engineering as applied to the engineering design process, shipbuilding, maintenance, and operation of marine vessels and structures. Naval architecture involves basic and applied research, design, development, design evaluation (classification) and calculations during all stages of the life of a marine vehicle. Preliminary design of the vessel, its detailed design, construction, trials, operation and maintenance, launching and dry-docking are the main activities involved. Ship design calculations are also required for ships being modified (by means of conversion, rebuilding, modernization, or repair). Naval architecture also involves formulation of safety regulations and damage-control rules and the approval and certification of ship designs to meet statutory and non-statutory requirements.

== Main subjects ==
The word "vessel" includes every description of watercraft, mainly ships and boats, but also including non-displacement craft, WIG craft and seaplanes, used or capable of being used as a means of transportation on water. The principal elements of naval architecture are detailed in the following sections.

=== Hydrostatics ===
Body plan of a ship showing the hull form

Hydrostatics concerns the conditions to which the vessel is subjected while at rest in water and to its ability to remain afloat. This involves computing buoyancy, displacement, and other hydrostatic properties such as trim (the measure of the longitudinal inclination of the vessel) and stability (the ability of a vessel to restore itself to an upright position after being inclined by wind, sea, or loading conditions).

=== Hydrodynamics ===
- Hydrodynamics concerns the flow of water around the ship's hull, bow, and stern, and over bodies such as propeller blades or rudder, or through thruster tunnels.
- Ship resistance and propulsion concern resistance towards motion in water primarily caused due to flow of water around the hull. Powering calculation is done based on this.
- Propulsion is used to move the vessel through water using propellers, thrusters, water jets, sails etc. Engine types are mainly internal combustion. Some vessels are electrically powered using nuclear or solar energy.
- Ship motions involves motions of the vessel in seaway and its responses in waves and wind.
- Controllability (maneuvering) involves controlling and maintaining position and direction of the vessel.

=== Flotation and stability ===
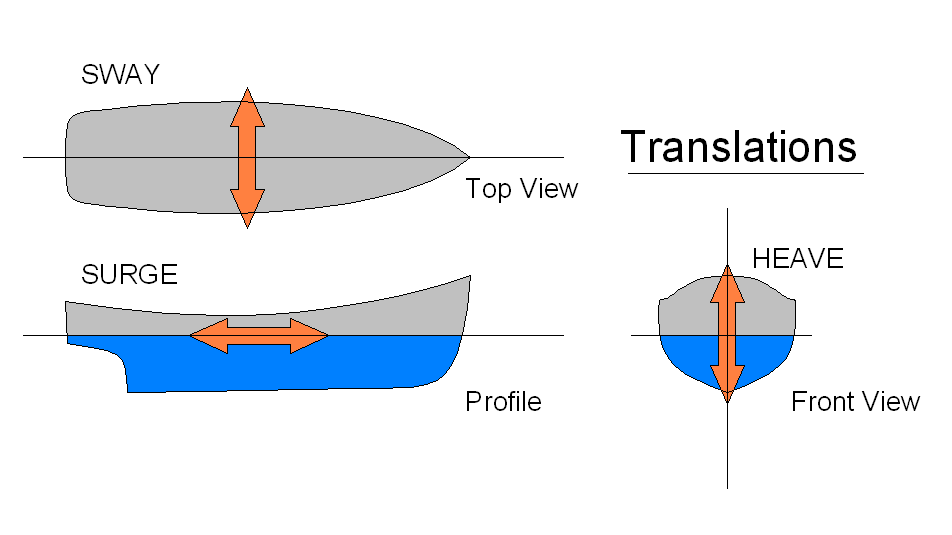
Translations

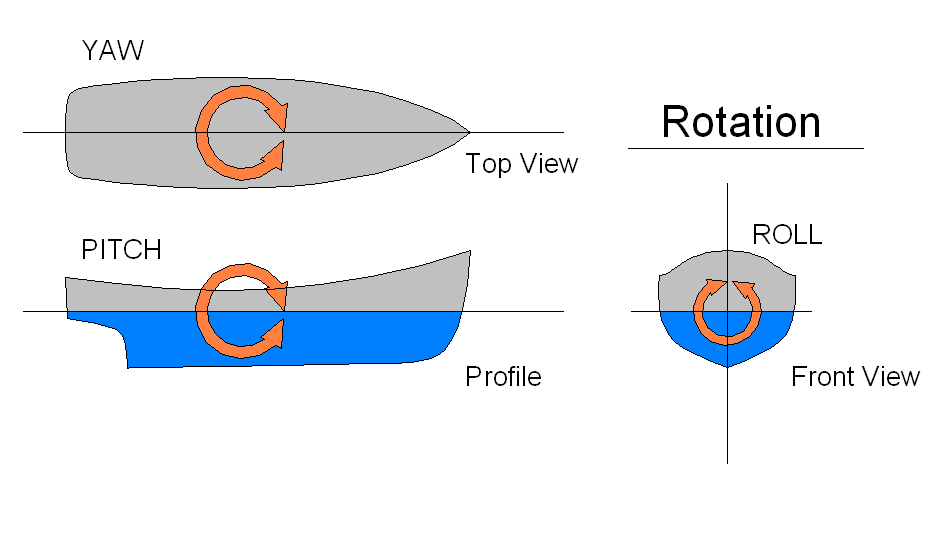
Axes of a ship and rotations around them

While atop a liquid surface a floating body has six degrees of freedom in its movements, these are categorized in either translation or rotation.

- Translation
  - Sway: transverse
  - Surge: fore and aft
  - Heave: vertical
- Rotation
  - Yaw: about the vertical axis
  - Pitch or trim: about the transverse axis
  - Roll or heel: about the fore-and-aft axis

Longitudinal stability for longitudinal inclinations, the stability depends upon the distance between the center of gravity and the longitudinal meta-center. In other words, the basis in which the ship maintains its center of gravity is its distance set equally apart from both the aft and forward section of the ship.

While a body floats on a liquid surface it still encounters the force of gravity pushing down on it. In order to stay afloat and avoid sinking there is an opposed force acting against the body known as the hydrostatic pressures. The forces acting on the body must be of the same magnitude and same line of motion in order to maintain the body at equilibrium. This description of equilibrium is only present when a freely floating body is in still water, when other conditions are present the magnitude of which these forces shifts drastically creating the swaying motion of the body.

The buoyancy force is equal to the weight of the body, in other words, the mass of the body is equal to the mass of the water displaced by the body. This adds an upward force to the body by the amount of surface area times the area displaced in order to create an equilibrium between the surface of the body and the surface of the water.

The stability of a ship under most conditions is able to overcome any form or restriction or resistance encountered in rough seas; however, ships have undesirable roll characteristics when the balance of oscillations in roll is two times that of oscillations in heave, thus causing the ship to capsize.

=== Structures ===
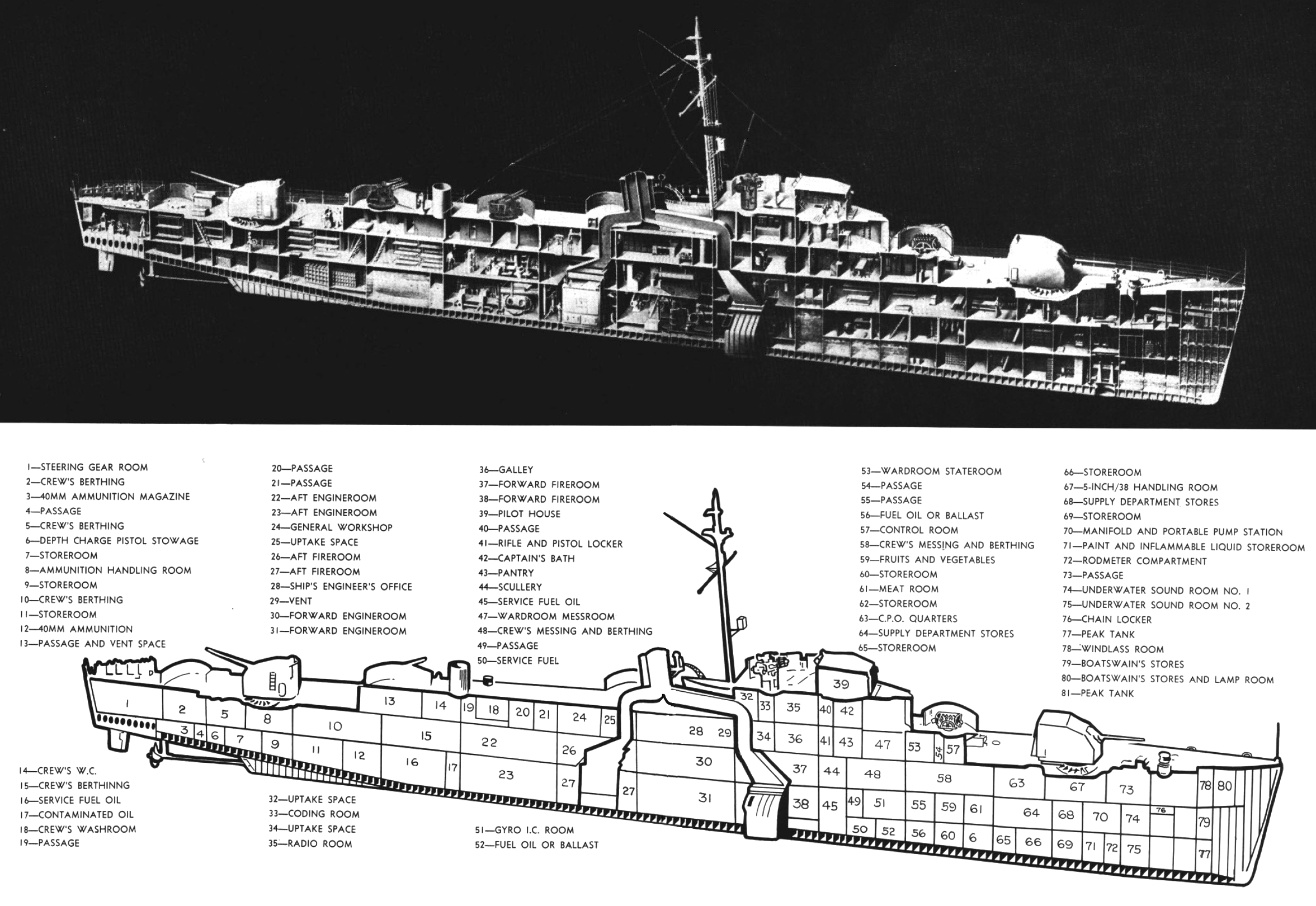
Cutaway of the structure of a US Navy WWII destroyer escort

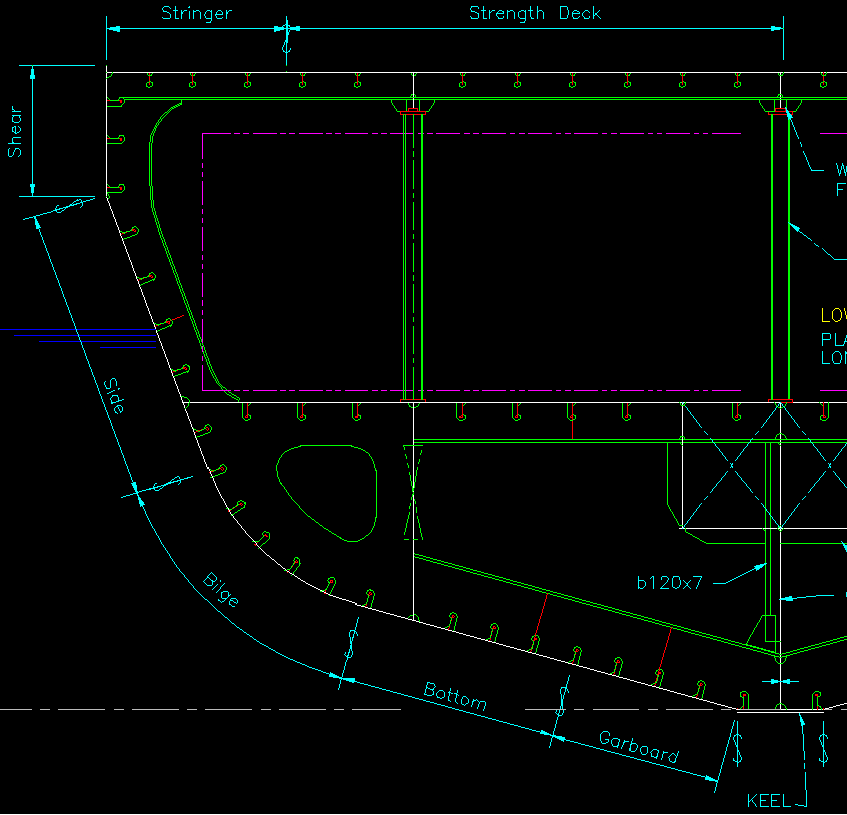
An autoCAD drawing of the various shell plating on a convention hull

Structures involves selection of material of construction, structural analysis of global and local strength of the vessel, vibration of the structural components and structural responses of the vessel during motions in seaway. Depending on type of ship, the structure and design will vary in what material to use as well as how much of it. Some ships are made from glass reinforced plastics but the vast majority are steel with possibly some aluminium in the superstructure.

The complete structure of the ship is designed with panels shaped in a rectangular form consisting of steel plating supported on four edges. Combined in a large surface area the Grillages create the hull of the ship, deck, and bulkheads while still providing mutual support of the frames. Though the structure of the ship is sturdy enough to hold itself together the main force it has to overcome is longitudinal bending creating a strain against its hull, its structure must be designed so that the material is disposed as much forward and aft as possible.

The principal longitudinal elements are the deck, shell plating, inner bottom all of which are in the form of grillages, and additional longitudinal stretching to these. The dimensions of the ship are in order to create enough spacing between the stiffeners in prevention of buckling. Warships have used a longitudinal system of stiffening that many modern commercial vessels have adopted. This system was widely used in early merchant ships such as the SS Great Eastern, but later shifted to transversely framed structure another concept in ship hull design that proved more practical. This system was later implemented on modern vessels such as tankers because of its popularity and was then named the Isherwood System.

The arrangement of the Isherwood system consists of stiffening decks both side and bottom by longitudinal members, they are separated enough so they have the same distance between them as the frames and beams. This system works by spacing out the transverse members that support the longitudinal by about three or four meters, with the wide spacing this causes the traverse strength needed by displacing the amount of force the bulkheads provide.

=== Arrangements ===
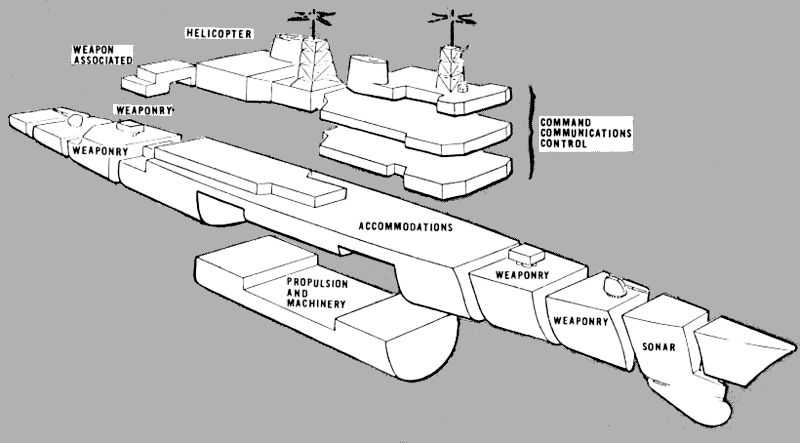
Functional areas of a destroyer

Arrangements involves concept design, layout and access, fire protection, allocation of spaces, ergonomics and capacity.

=== Construction ===
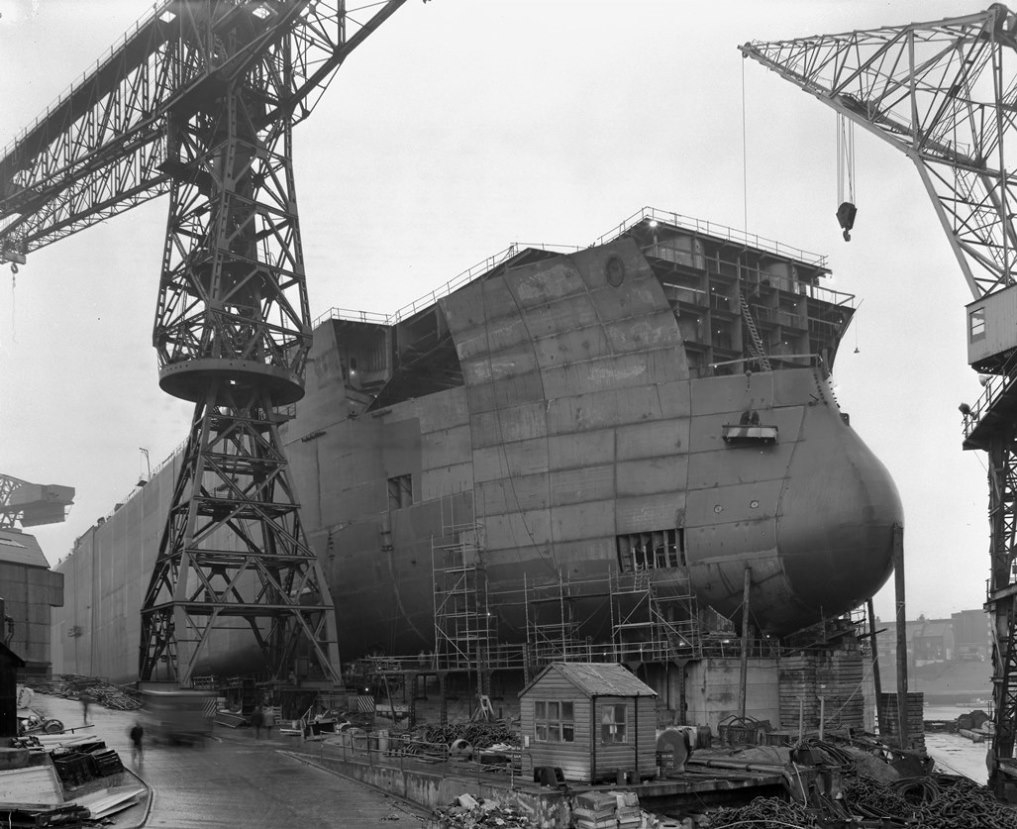
Shipbuilding with steel, 1973

Construction depends on the material used. When steel or aluminium is used this involves welding of the plates and profiles after rolling, marking, cutting and bending as per the structural design drawings or models, followed by erection and launching. Other joining techniques are used for other materials like fibre reinforced plastic and glass-reinforced plastic. The process of construction is thought-out cautiously while considering all factors like safety, strength of structure, hydrodynamics, and ship arrangement. Each factor considered presents a new option for materials to consider as well as ship orientation. When the strength of the structure is considered the acts of ship collision are considered in the way that the ships structure is altered. Therefore, the properties of materials are considered carefully as applied material on the struck ship has elastic properties, the energy absorbed by the ship being struck is then deflected in the opposite direction, so both ships go through the process of rebounding to prevent further damage.

== Science and craft ==
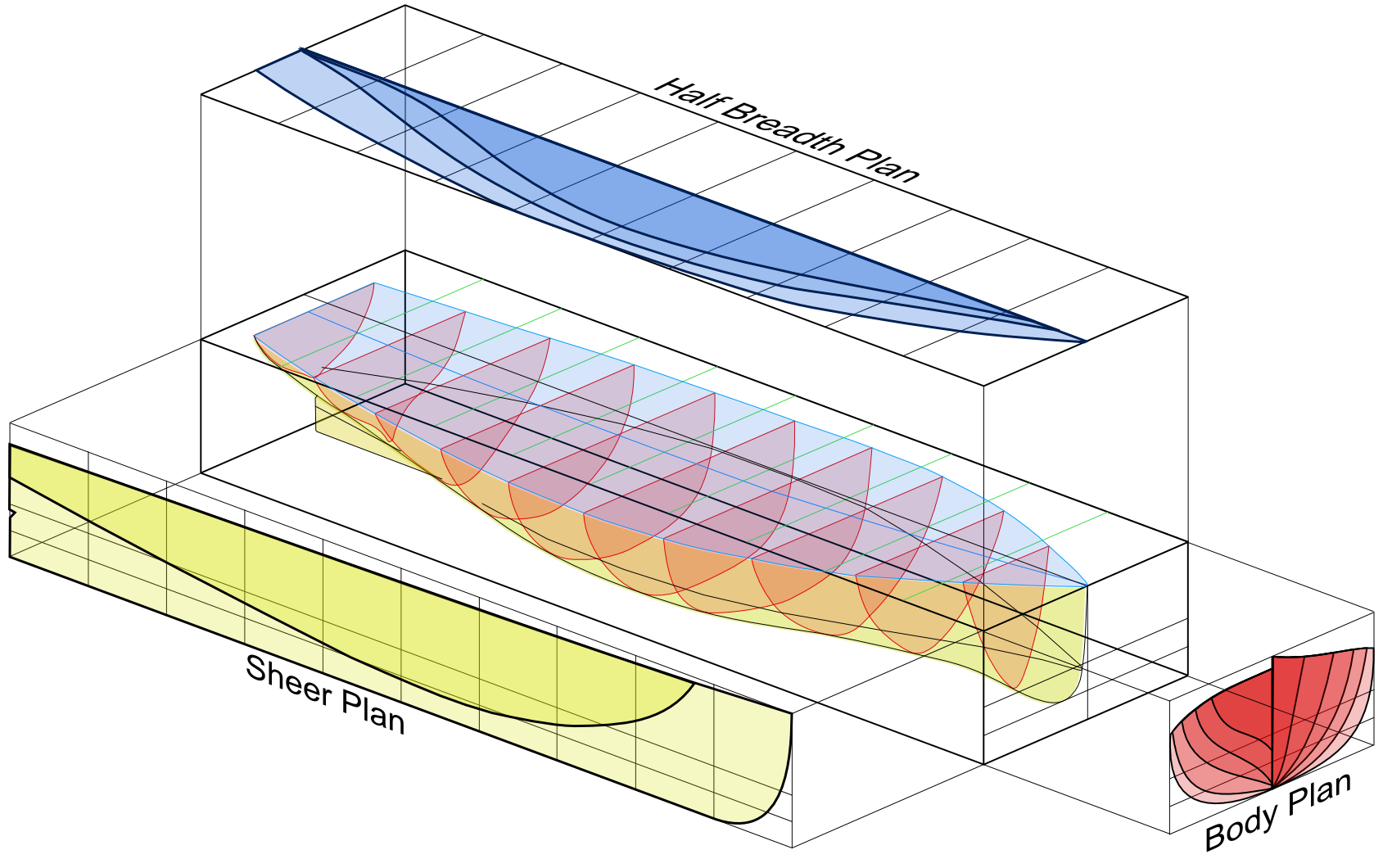
Smooth ship lines

Traditionally, naval architecture has been more craft than science. The suitability of a vessel's shape was judged by looking at a half-model of a vessel or a prototype. Ungainly shapes or abrupt transitions were frowned on as being flawed. This included rigging, deck arrangements, and even fixtures. Subjective descriptors such as ungainly, full, and fine were used as a substitute for the more accurate terms used today. A vessel was, and still is described as having a fair shape. Fair is meant to denote not only a smooth transition from fore to aft but also a shape that is right. Determining what is right in a particular situation in the absence of definitive supporting analysis encompasses the art of naval architecture to this day.

Modern low-cost digital computers and dedicated software, combined with extensive research to correlate full-scale, towing tank and computational data, have enabled naval architects to more accurately predict the performance of a marine vehicle. These tools are used for static stability (intact and damaged), dynamic stability, resistance, powering, hull development, structural analysis, green water modelling, and slamming analysis. Data are regularly shared in international conferences sponsored by RINA, Society of Naval Architects and Marine Engineers (SNAME) and others. Computational Fluid Dynamics is being applied to predict the response of a floating body in a random sea.

== The naval architect ==
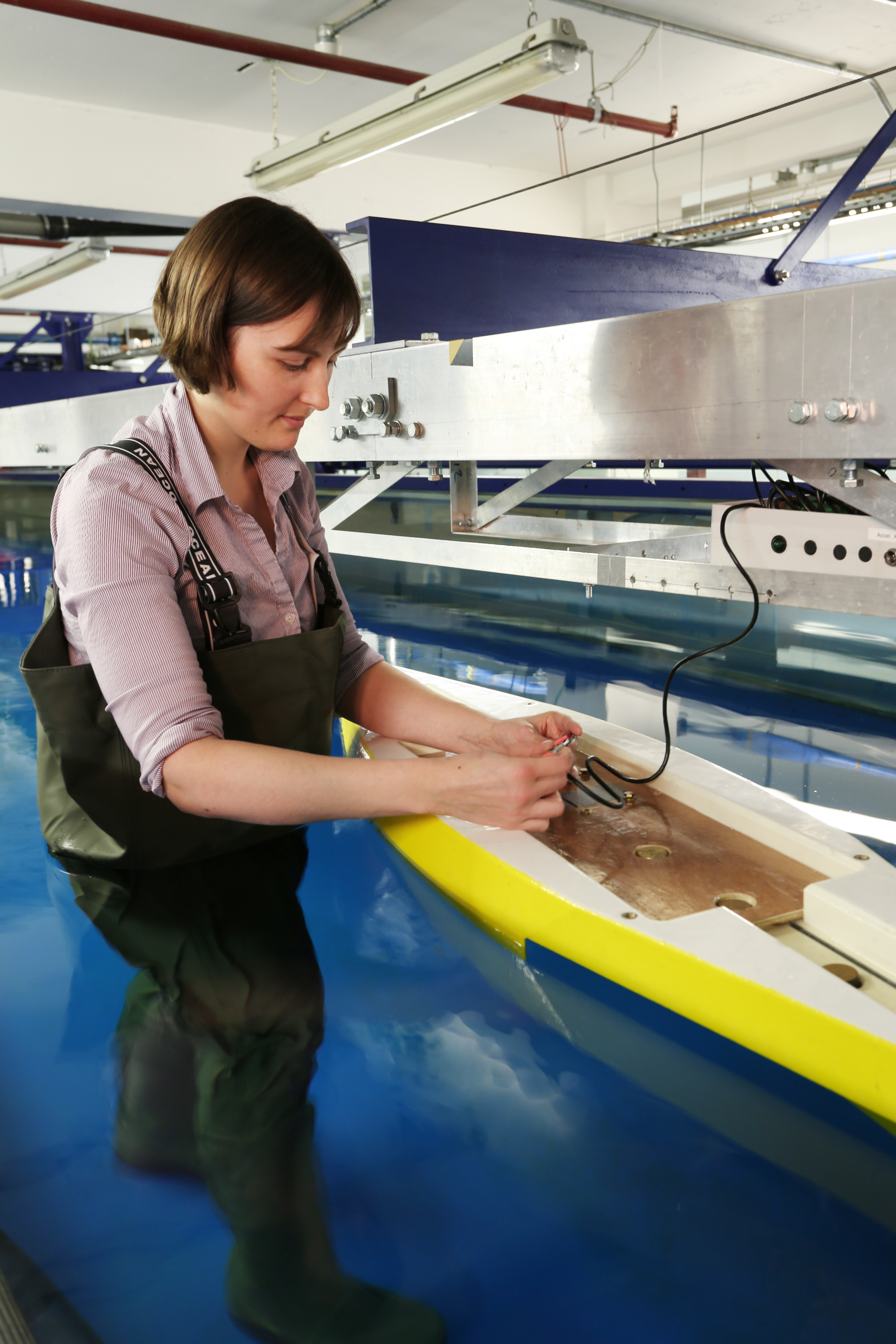
Naval architect at work

Due to the complexity associated with operating in a marine environment, naval architecture is a co-operative effort between groups of technically skilled individuals who are specialists in particular fields, often coordinated by a lead naval architect. This inherent complexity also means that the analytical tools available are much less evolved than those for designing aircraft, cars and even spacecraft. This is due primarily to the paucity of data on the environment the marine vehicle is required to work in and the complexity of the interaction of waves and wind on a marine structure.

A naval architect is an engineer who is responsible for the design, classification, survey, construction, and/or repair of ships, boats, other marine vessels, and offshore structures, both commercial and military, including:

- Merchant ships – oil tankers, gas tankers, cargo ships, bulk carriers, container ships
- Passenger/vehicle ferries, cruise ships
- Warships – frigates, destroyers, aircraft carriers, amphibious ships
- Submarines and underwater vehicles
- Icebreakers
- High speed craft – hovercraft, multi-hull ships, hydrofoil craft
- Workboats – barges, fishing boats, anchor handling tug supply vessels, platform supply vessels, tug boats, pilot vessels, rescue craft
- Yachts, power boats, and other recreational watercraft
- Offshore platforms and subsea developments

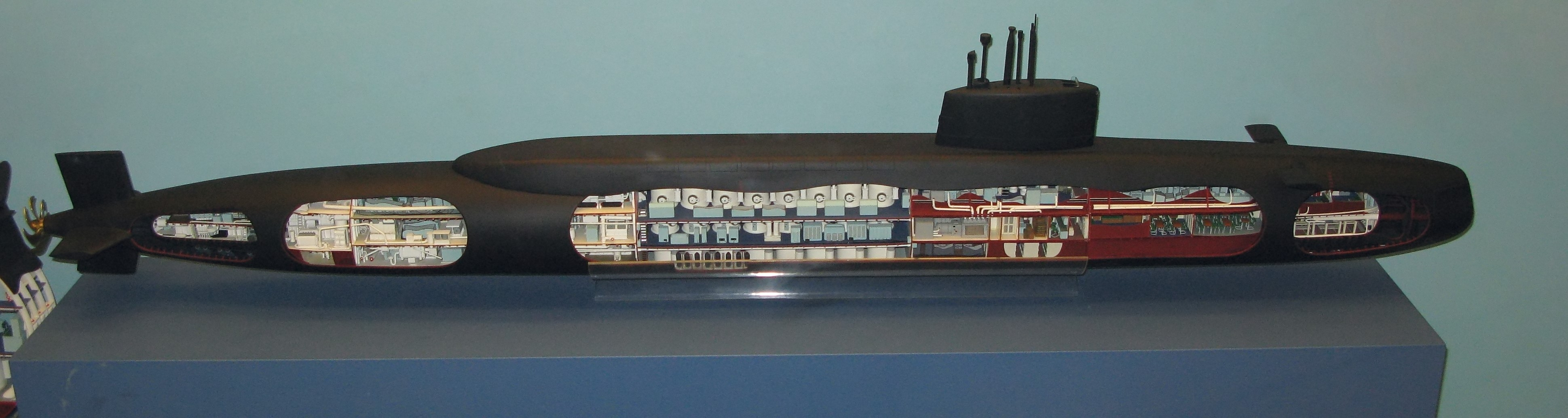
Cutaway of a nuclear submarine

Some of these vessels are amongst the largest (such as supertankers), most complex (such as aircraft carriers), and highly valued movable structures produced by mankind. They are typically the most efficient method of transporting the world's raw materials and products. Modern engineering on this scale is essentially a team activity conducted by specialists in their respective fields and disciplines. Naval architects integrate these activities. This role requires managerial qualities and the ability to bring together the often-conflicting demands of the various design constraints to produce a product which is fit for the purpose.

In addition to this leadership role, a naval architect also has a duty to ensure a safe, economic, environmentally sound, and seaworthy design has been produced. To undertake all these tasks, a naval architect must have an understanding of many branches of engineering. They must be able to utilize the services provided by scientists, lawyers, accountants, and business people of many kinds.

Naval architects typically work for shipyards, ship owners, design firms and consultancies, equipment manufacturers, Classification societies, regulatory bodies (Admiralty law), navies, and governments.

== List of naval architecture software ==
- Autodesk Inventor including Nastran FEM
- Autodesk Revit Accommodation design, MEP design, general arrangement
- Aveva – Tribon
- FORAN System
- NAPA
- PIAS
- Orca3D – plugin for Rhinoceros 3D
- Safehull
- Sesam

== See also ==
- Autonomous cargo ship – Crewless vehicles that transport cargo
- Bulkhead (partition) – Vertical partition inside a ship
- Collier (ship) – Bulk cargo ship to carry coal
- Coastal engineering – Branch of civil engineering
- Engine officer – Licensed mariner responsible for propulsion plants and support systems
- Hull (watercraft) – Watertight buoyant body of a ship or boat
- Hydraulic engineering – Sub-discipline of civil engineering
- Hydrodynamics – Study of liquids in motion
- Hydrostatics – Branch of fluid mechanics that studies fluids at rest
- International Maritime Organization – Specialized agency of the United Nations
- List of maritime colleges
- Longitudinal framing – Type of ship hull structure
- Marine architecture – Branch of architecture focused on coastal, near-shore and off-shore construction
- Marine engineering – Engineering and design of shipboard systems
- Marine propulsion – Systems for generating thrust for ships and boats on water
- Naval ship – Military ship used by a navy
- Ocean engineering – Engineering and design of shipboard systems
- Offshore construction – Installation of structures and facilities in a marine environment
- Royal Institution of Naval Architects – International organisation representing naval architects
- Seakeeping – Response of a vessel to sea conditions
- Seaworthiness – Response of a vessel to sea conditions
- Shipbuilding – Construction of ships and floating vessels
- Ship classification society – Organisation establishing technical standards for ships and offshore structures
- Ship motions – Ships motions as defined by the six degrees of freedom of motion
- Ship stability – Ship response to disturbance from an upright condition
- Society of Naval Architects and Marine Engineers – Global professional society
