= American Bureau of Shipping =

American maritime classification society established in 1862

American Bureau of Shipping (ABS)
- Industry: Marine Classification
- Genre: Classification Society
- Founded: 1862
- Headquarters: Houston, Texas, United States
- Number of locations: 200 offices
- Key people: John McDonald (chairman and CEO)
- Services: Classification
- Number of employees: 5,500
- Website: www.eagle.org

The American Bureau of Shipping (ABS) is an American maritime classification society established in 1862. Its stated mission is to promote the security of life, property, and the natural environment, primarily through the development and verification of standards for the design, construction and operational maintenance of marine and offshore assets.

ABS's core business is providing global classification services to the marine, offshore, and gas industries. As of 2020, ABS was the second largest class society with a classed fleet of over 12,000 commercial vessels and offshore facilities. ABS develops its standards and technical specifications, known collectively as the ABS Rules & Guides. These Rules form the basis for assessing the design and construction of new vessels and the integrity of existing vessels and marine structures.

== History ==
ABS was first chartered in the state of New York in 1862 as the American Shipmasters’ Association (ASA) to certify qualified ship captains, or shipmasters, for safe ship operations during the Civil War. While ASA's certificates were not an official requirement for shipmasters, the certificate served as a recommendation for shipowners. Vessels that sailed with a certified ASA shipmaster were more likely to find favorable insurance coverage.

The ASA published its first technical standards, Rules for Survey and Classing Wooden Vessels, in 1870. In the late 19th century, wooden ships became obsolete and gave way to iron as a shipbuilding material. In response, ASA published its first Rules for Survey and Classing of Iron Vessels in 1877. Similarly, when iron gave way to steel, ABS Rules for Building and Classing Steel Vessels were established and published in 1890. These Steel Vessel Rules continue to be revised and published annually.

The ASA continued its program of certifying shipmasters until May 1900. By this time, federal law required that the United States government license most sea officers. As its business shifted from the certification of shipmasters to the classification of ships, the American Shipmasters’ Association renamed itself the American Bureau of Shipping in 1898. ABS would achieve modest growth over the next few years, classing 21% of all U.S.-flag fleet by 1916. During World War I, the U.S.-flag fleet swelled with newly acquired ships as well as newly constructed or refurbished vessels. ABS received a large amount of this class work, and the total tonnage classed by ABS increased from approximately 230,000 tons in 1916 to 3,301,000 tons in 1919. A similar effect occurred during the Second World War as ABS tonnage in the class jumped from 1.53 million gross tons in 1940 to 5.49 million gross tons in 1941.

As postwar recovery led to industrialization around the world, ABS entered a period of global expansion and soon opened offices in Western Europe, Africa, Asia, and South America. By 1962, ABS class tonnage has increased to 46,533,852 tons worldwide. ABS’ aggregate tonnage hit a record of 193.5 million gross tons in 2012. ABS also strengthened its ties with the U.S. government by providing services to numerous government organizations such as the U.S. Navy, the U.S. Coast Guard, Military Sealift Command, the U.S. Maritime Administration, the Army Corps of Engineers and the National Oceanic and Atmospheric Administration.

=== World Trade Center ===
ABS operated a New York office at the 91st floor of the One World Trade Center until September 11, 2001. While all employees of the company in the 91st floor office escaped the building collapse, none of the employees present at 92nd floor or higher survived.

== Organization and management ==
ABS has been organized as a not-for-profit since its founding in 1862. ABS has been commissioned by the U.S. government and the U.S. Coast Guard to act in many maritime matters and has hired several former officers from the Coast Guard. ABS is required under U.S. law to maintain its status as a not-for-profit organization to maintain its role as the agent of the U.S. government on matters of government vessel classification.

Since 2026, John McDonald has served as ABS' Chairman and Chief Executive Officer. The ABS world headquarters is located in Spring, Texas. ABS is currently organized by market sector: Global Marine, Global Offshore and Government Services. There are over 5,500 employees worldwide, with multiple offices in the U.S., China, Brazil, Mexico, Spain, and Canada. ABS surveyors and engineers work at major ports worldwide including Houston, Piraeus, Hong Kong, Singapore, London, Shanghai, Busan, Yokohama, Genoa, Gdańsk, Hamburg and other cities. Surveyors are employed in ports and shipyards worldwide to verify that marine asset are in suitable condition, meet class requirements and built according to drawings.

== Services ==
=== Classification ===
The primary responsibility of ABS as a classification society is to verify that ABS-classed ships and marine structures comply with the established ABS Rules for design, construction, and periodic survey. If a vessel is found not to comply with the Rules, and the recommendations of ABS are not followed, then the society will suspend or cancel classification. ABS Rules are derived from principles of naval architecture, marine engineering, and associated disciplines.

For vessels built to ABS class, ABS engineers must approve the vessel design during engineering review. After design approval, ABS field surveyors attend to the vessel from keel laying to delivery at the shipyard. During the construction of a vessel built to ABS class, surveyors witness the tests of materials for the hull and specific machinery items as required by the Rules. They also survey the building, installation, and testing of the structural and principal mechanical and electrical systems.

Plimsoll mark of ABS

=== Rules and guides ===
ABS provides a database of its rules and guides to the public.

=== Offshore and energy services ===
ABS also develops standards for the design, construction, and operational maintenance of offshore drilling and production units and gas carriers of all types. These standards cover mobile offshore drilling units (such as jackup rigs, semisubmersible rigs, and drill ships), floating offshore production installations (spars, tension leg platforms, semisubmersibles, and FPSOs/FSOs), fixed offshore installations, pipelines, risers, and single point moorings. ABS was responsible for classing the first mobile offshore drilling unit, the first production spar, the first semisubmersible offshore wind turbine and the first offshore support vessel in the Gulf of Mexico to use hybrid power.

=== Statutory services ===
ABS also acts as a Recognized Organization on behalf of more than 100 governments. A Recognized Organization is authorized by a flag State to conduct plan review and statutory surveys on ships registered under that flag on behalf of the nation's maritime administration. Typical regulations include the U.S. Code of Federal Regulations (CFR), SOLAS, MARPOL regulations, and the International Convention on Load Lines. In addition to the national or international tonnage certificates, Panama and Suez Canal tonnage certificates can be issued by ABS on behalf of those authorities.

== Prestige oil spill ==
The Prestige was an oil tanker whose sinking in 2002 off the Galician coast caused the Prestige oil spill. The large oil spill was described as, “one of the worst environmental disasters in Europe” and caused great damage to the local wildlife and fishing industry.

In May 2003, the Kingdom of Spain brought a civil suit in the Southern District of New York against the American Bureau of Shipping, asserting that ABS was “reckless” in certifying the ship seaworthy and capable of carrying fuel cargo and sought over $1 billion in compensatory damages.

The Reino de España v. American Bureau of Shipping, Inc. court case was dismissed after the presiding judge ruled that ABS is a "person" as defined by the International Convention on Civil Liability for Oil Pollution Damage (CLC) and, as such, is exempt from direct liability for pollution damage. Furthermore, the judge ruled that, since the United States is not a signatory to the International CLC, the U.S. Courts lacked the necessary jurisdiction to adjudicate the case.

Spain appealed the ruling, and in 2012, the Second Circuit Court of Appeals ruled in favor of ABS again. In its opinion, the Court of Appeals determined there was a lack of proof that ABS and its subsidiaries, “recklessly breached any duty of care that may have been owed to Spain through any inaction or action taken in the U.S."

== ABS Academy ==
ABS Academy, a specialized division of ABS, provides courses and seminars on marine and offshore operations, management systems, risk assessment, and management, qualification and certification, and environmental awareness to shipowners and shipbuilders. The academy conducts web-based training in addition to having academy locations in Greece, Singapore, the United States, China, and South Korea.

== ABS Group ==
Established in 1971, ABS Group is a wholly owned subsidiary of ABS. ABS Group provides technical advisory services and risk management solutions to a broad range of industries including industrial manufacturing, oil and gas, chemical, alternative energy, offshore and the public sector.

== ABS Wavesight ==
Launched in 2022, ABS Wavesight is an ABS Affiliate maritime software as a service (SaaS) company focused on helping shipowners and operators streamline compliance as well increase the efficiency and sustainability of operations. Its products are collectively installed on more than 5,000 vessels across the global fleet.

== See also ==
- International Association of Classification Societies
- Safehull
- Type Approval
- 65 Broadway – ABS owned this building as its headquarters 1977 to 1986, and it retains a large ABS eagle and anchor atop its front
