= Frederic Wake-Walker =

Royal Navy officer (1888–1945)

Admiral Sir Frederic Wake-Walker KCB CBE
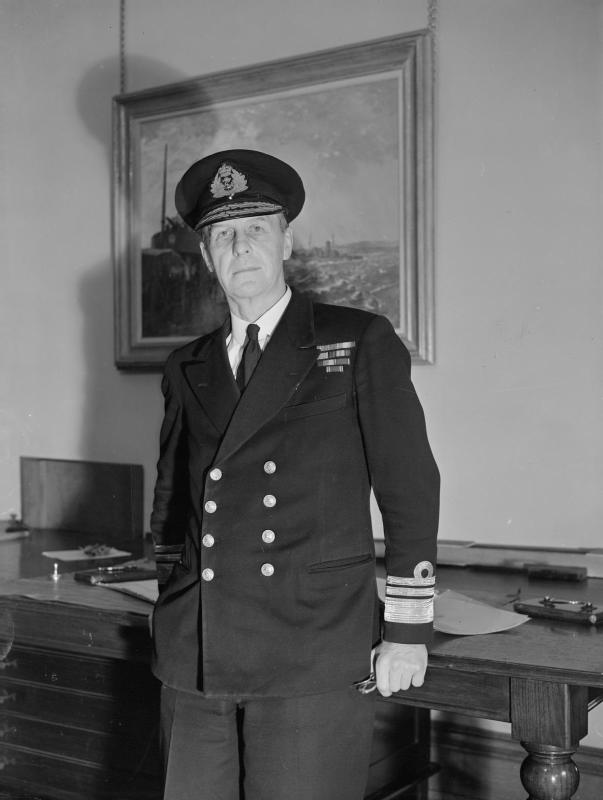
- Wake-Walker when Third Sea Lord, January 1944
- Born: William Frederic Wake-Walker; 24 March 1888
- Died: 24 September 1945 (aged 57); London, England
- Relatives: Admiral Sir Baldwin Wake Walker (grandfather)
- Military career
- Allegiance: United Kingdom
- Branch: Royal Navy
- Service years: 1903–1945
- Rank: Admiral
- Commands: 1st Cruiser Squadron (1941–42); Force K (1040–41); 1st Mine Laying Squadron (1940); 12th Cruiser Squadron (1939); HMS Revenge (1938); HMS Dragon (1932–35); HMS Castor (1929–30)
- Conflicts: First World War; Second World War; Dunkirk evacuation; Battle of the Atlantic; Battle of the Denmark Strait; Last battle of the battleship Bismarck
- Awards: Knight Commander of the Order of the Bath; Commander of the Order of the British Empire

Admiral Sir William Frederic Wake-Walker (24 March 1888 – 24 September 1945) was a senior Royal Navy officer who served in the First and Second World Wars. He took a leading part in Operation Dynamo, the evacuation at Dunkirk, and in the destruction of the Bismarck.

== Early life and education ==
Born William Frederic Wake-Walker, he was the son of Frederic George Arthur Wake-Walker and Mary Eleanor Forster and the grandson of Admiral Sir Baldwin Wake Walker, who was Surveyor of the Navy from 1848 to 1861. After attending Haileybury school, Wake-Walker entered the Royal Naval College at Dartmouth as a cadet in 1903, and went to sea the following year as midshipman aboard HMS Good Hope, the flagship of the 1st Cruiser Squadron.

== Early naval career ==
=== First World War ===
By the outbreak of the First World War, Wake-Walker had risen to the rank of lieutenant, and served as torpedo lieutenant on HMS Cochrane from 1913 to 1915. He was promoted to lieutenant-commander in July 1916 and after training at HMS Vernon, was appointed to the new battleship HMS Ramillies, serving in her until the end of the war.

Wake-Walker was promoted to commander in June 1920, serving aboard HMS Coventry from 1919 to 1921. Between 1921 and 1925, he served at the Royal Naval College, Greenwich, then at the Tactical School, Portsmouth. He returned to sea as executive officer of HMS Royal Oak from 1925 to 1927. Wake-Walker achieved flag rank on 10 January 1939.

=== Liability for the collision between HMS Dragon and Maplebranch ===
On 13 August 1934, HMS Dragon under Wake-Walker's command was entering the Market (or Victoria) Basin in the harbour of Montreal, Quebec, Canada, when the ship collided with an oil bunkering steamer, Maplebranch, which was securely moored at the time of the collision. Maplebranch sank. The steamer's owners sued Wake-Walker for the damages to Maplebranch and its cargo, alleged to have been caused solely by the improper and negligent navigation and mismanagement of Dragon by Wake-Walker. In his defence, Wake-Walker pleaded inevitable accident, caused by the maneuvering of a third vessel, Saguenay Trader, which Wake-Walker was trying to avoid hitting.

The Admiralty action was heard by the Exchequer Court of Canada (Quebec Admiralty District), which held that Wake-Walker was liable. Wake-Walker appealed to the Supreme Court of Canada, which upheld the finding of liability on a 3–2 majority. Speaking for the majority, Justice Henry Hague Davis held that when a vessel under steam collides with a moored vessel, the commander of the vessel under steam is presumed liable for the collision, and has the onus of proving that he was not negligent. Wake-Walker had not done so. In addition, the trial judge had found actual fault by Wake-Walker in his navigation of Dragon and there was no basis to set aside that finding on appeal. Wake-Walker then appealed to the Judicial Committee of the Imperial Privy Council, at that time the highest court of appeal for the British Empire. That court dismissed the appeal. Speaking for the Judicial Committee, Viscount Sankey agreed with the courts below that Wake-Walker had not discharged the onus to prove that the accident had been inevitable.

== Second World War ==
Wake-Walker was first appointed rear-admiral commanding the 12th Cruiser Squadron in September 1939. This appointment lasted only a short time as he soon returned to the Admiralty as head of a special group created to develop magnetic mine countermeasures. In May 1940, Wake-Walker was appointed rear-admiral in command of all ships and vessels off the Franco-Belgian coast for the evacuation of Dunkirk. Wake-Walker reached Dunkirk in the minesweeper HMS Hebe on 30 May. On 1 June his flagship, the destroyer HMS Keith, was sunk by Ju 87 Stukas, and he thereafter directed operations from the motor torpedo boat MTB 102 in the harbour. For his role in the evacuation, he was appointed a Companion of the Order of the Bath.

=== Sinking Bismarck ===
In late May 1941, two of Wake-Walker's heavy cruisers – HMS Suffolk and his flagship HMS Norfolk – were positioned north west of Iceland to intercept and shadow the Bismarck if she attempted to break out into the Atlantic. Bismarck sortied from Bergen towards the Denmark Strait on 21 May in company with the heavy cruiser Prinz Eugen.

On 23 May 1941 at 19:22, Suffolk sighted Bismarck and Prinz Eugen. After a brief exchange of fire, the out-gunned British ships took cover in nearby fog and tracked the enemy by radar. They maintained contact with the two German ships through the night despite appalling weather, and guided Vice-Admiral Lancelot Holland's two capital ships HMS Hood and HMS Prince of Wales into position to intercept Bismarck. The two forces came together in the Battle of the Denmark Strait the next day.

Vice-Admiral Holland was killed when Hood was destroyed, and many of Prince of Wales's senior officers were killed or wounded, which left Wake-Walker in command of the surviving Norfolk, Suffolk and Prince of Wales. He decided not to risk continuing the battle but to shadow the German ships, believing that Admiral John Tovey, with powerful elements of the Home Fleet, was approaching. Wake-Walker stayed in the trail of Bismarck, but radar contact was lost early on 25 May. Wake-Walker sent Suffolk to search to the southwest, and thus she played no further role in the battle. Norfolk turned east, and was at the sinking of the Bismarck, the following day.

Later, moves were made to court-martial Wake-Walker and Captain John Leach of Prince of Wales. The view was taken that they were wrong not to have continued the battle with Bismarck after Hood had sunk. John Tovey, Commander-in-Chief of the Home Fleet, was appalled at this criticism. A row ensued between Tovey and his superior, Admiral Sir Dudley Pound. Tovey stated that the two officers had acted correctly, not endangering their ships needlessly and ensuring that the German ships were tracked. Tovey threatened to resign his position and appear at any court-martial as 'defendant's friend' and defence witness. No more was heard of the proposal. (Note: Kennedy expounds on the court martial claim via the epilogue in Pursuit – The Sinking of the Bismarck. According to Kennedy the claim for a proposal to court martial Wake-Walker came from post war letters written by Admiral Tovey to Stephen Roskill, after he retired, and not from Admiralty sources. Kennedy states in his epilogue that "...later in life Tovey's memory let him down..." and that plus the fact that Wake-Walker was retained in his command and given a commendation must cast considerable doubt on the court martial proposal.) For his part in the destruction of Bismarck, Wake-Walker was appointed a Commander of the Order of the British Empire. In 1943 Wake-Walker was appointed a Knight Commander of the Order of the Bath.

== Personal life ==
Wake-Walker married Muriel Elsie Hughes (1890–1963), only daughter of Sir Collingwood Hughes of East Bergholt, Suffolk, at St Paul's Church, Knightsbridge, on 19 January 1916. They had two sons and two daughters, including the artist Penelope Hughes Wake-Walker (1917–2003), who married Sir Geoffrey Eley of East Bergholt, and Capt. Christopher Baldwin Hughes Wake-Walker (1920–1998), who married Anne (1920–2020), daughter of the 7th Earl Spencer and aunt of Diana, Princess of Wales.

He died unexpectedly at his home in London on 24 September 1945 at the age of 57 and is buried in East Bergholt cemetery.

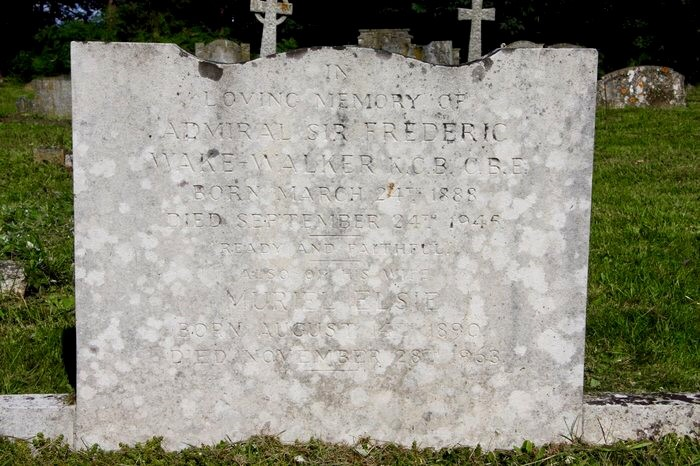
Wake-Walker's grave at East Bergholt cemetery, Suffolk.

== Notes ==
Military offices
Preceded by Sir Bruce Fraser	Third Sea Lord and Controller of the Navy; 1942–1945	Succeeded by Sir Charles Daniel
