= Conning tower =

Raised command platform on a naval vessel

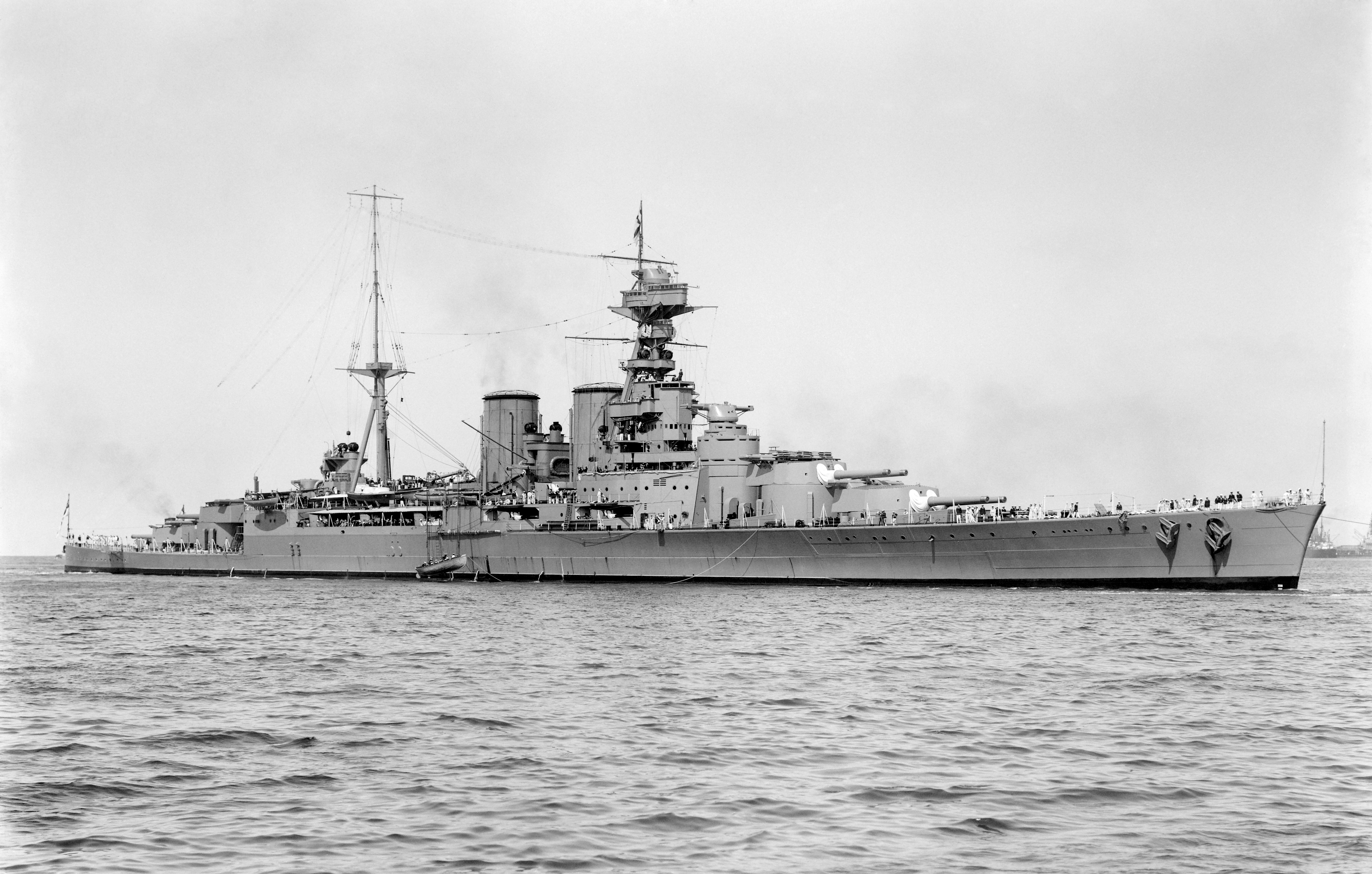
HMS Hood conning tower and bridge

| 1 / Conning tower | 2 / Bridge |

A conning tower is a raised platform on a ship or submarine, often armoured, from which an officer in charge can con (direct) the vessel, controlling movements of the ship by giving orders to those responsible for the ship's engine, rudder, lines, and ground tackle. It is usually located as high on the ship as is practical, to give the conning team good visibility of the entirety of the ship, ocean conditions, and other vessels.

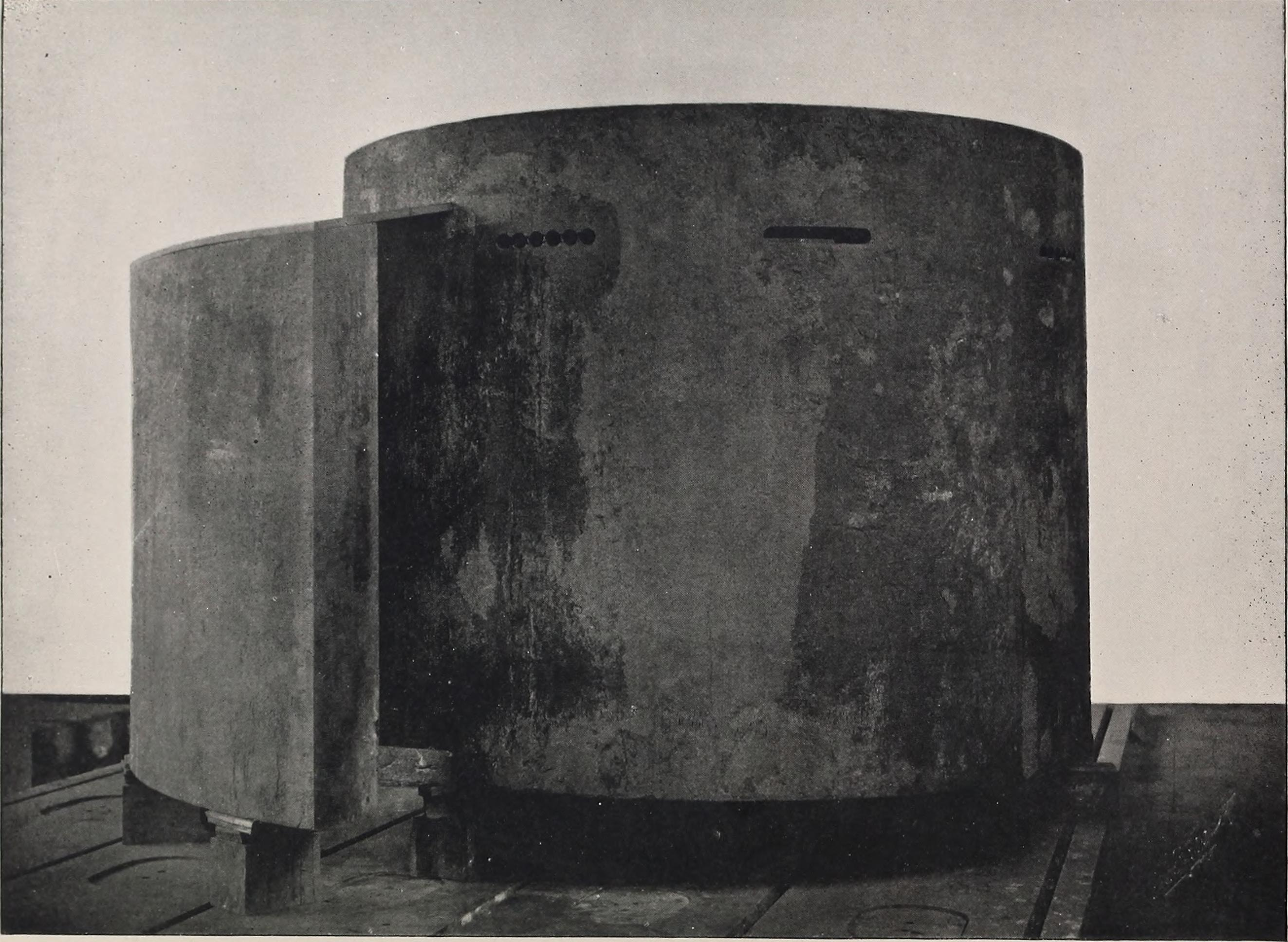
The conning tower of USS Massachusetts (BB-2) during construction c. 1892

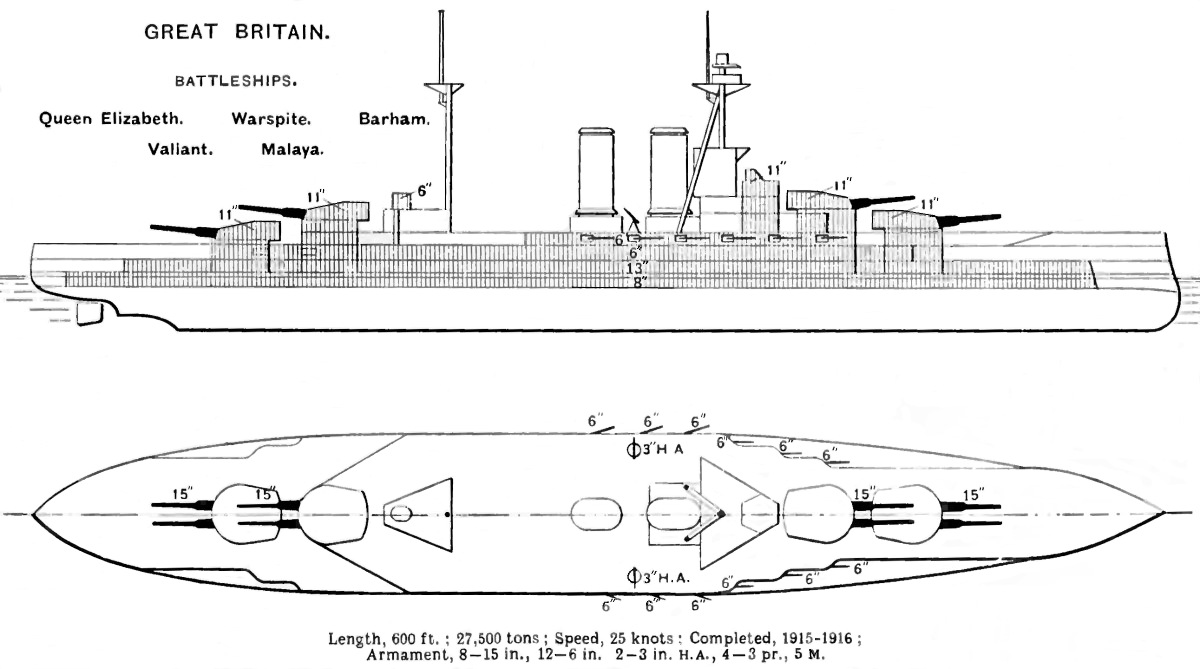
Queen Elizabeth-class battleship armour layout, with conning tower having the same heavy 11 inches (28 cm) armour as the gun turrets while the bridge is unarmoured

== Surface ships ==
On surface ships, the conning tower was a feature of all battleships and armoured cruisers from about 1860 to the early years of World War II. Located at the front end of the superstructure, the conning tower was a heavily armored cylinder, with tiny slit windows on three sides providing a reasonable field of view. Designed to shield just enough personnel and devices for navigation during battles, its interior was cramped and basic, with little more than engine order telegraphs, speaking tubes or telephones, and perhaps a steering wheel. At all other times than during battles, the ship would be commanded and helmed from the bridge.

Conning towers were used by the French on their floating batteries at the Battle of Kinburn. They were then fitted to the first ironclad French battleship La Gloire. The first Royal Navy (RN) conning tower appeared on HMS Warrior which had 3 inches of armour.

In the Royal Navy, the conning tower became a massive structure reaching weights of hundreds of tons on the Admiral-class battlecruisers (such as HMS Hood), and formed part of a massive armoured citadel (superstructure) on the mid-1920s Nelson-class battleships, which had armour over a foot thick. The King George V class, in contrast to the Nelson class, had comparatively light conning tower protection with 110-millimetre (4.5 in) sides, 76-millimetre (3 in) front and rear, and 51-millimetre (2 in) roof and deck. The RN's analysis of World War I combat revealed that command personnel were unlikely to use an armoured conning tower, preferring the superior visibility of unarmoured bridge positions. Older RN battleships that were reconstructed with new superstructures had their heavily armoured conning towers removed and replaced with much lighter structures. These new conning towers were also placed much higher in the ship, for superior visibility. There is no evidence that RN captains and admirals used the armoured conning towers on those ships that did have them during World War II, with, for example, Vice-Admiral Holland and Captain Kerr commanding Hood during the Battle of the Denmark Strait from her unarmoured bridge. Even in the United States Navy (USN), battleship captains and admirals preferred to use the unarmoured bridge positions during combat.

The USN had mixed opinions of the conning tower, pointing out that its weight, high above the ship's center of gravity, did not contribute directly to fighting ability. Beginning in the late 1930s, as radar surpassed visual sighting as the primary method of detecting other ships, battleships began reducing or eliminating the conning tower. The Naval Battle of Guadalcanal during World War II briefly slowed this trend: when the Japanese battleship Kirishima hit USS South Dakota on the superstructure, many exposed crewmen were killed or wounded; yet Admiral Lee and Captain Davis of USS Washington declined to use the armoured conning tower during the battle. Soon the heavy battleship conning towers were removed from USS Pennsylvania, USS Tennessee, USS California, and USS West Virginia during their post-Pearl Harbor attack reconstructions and replaced with much lighter cruiser-style conning towers.

By the end of World War II, US ships were designed with expanded weather bridges enclosing the armoured conning towers. On Iowa-class battleships, the conning tower is a 439-millimetre (17.3 in) thick vertical armour-plated cylinder with slit windows located in the middle of the bridge, climbing from the 03 level all the way up to the flying bridge on the 05 level.

With the demise of battleships after World War II, along with the advent of missiles and nuclear weapons during the Cold War, modern warships no longer feature conning towers.

== Submarines ==
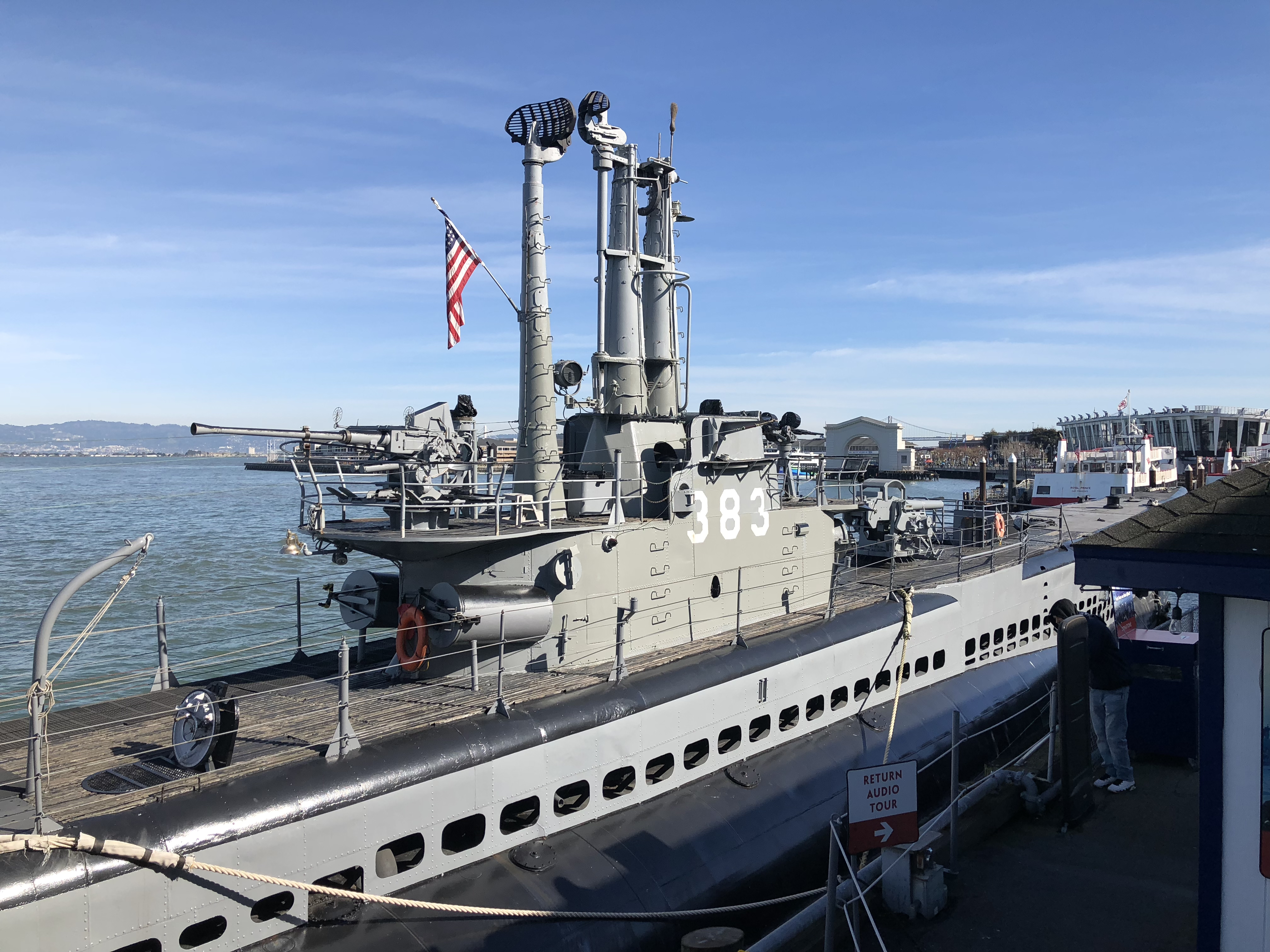
Bridge fairwater of USS Pampanito. The boat's conning tower is more of a "conning tube", as it lies parallel with the main pressure hull. Just over 6 metres (20 ft) long, with a diameter of roughly twice the distance between the weather deck and the bottom of the number "383".

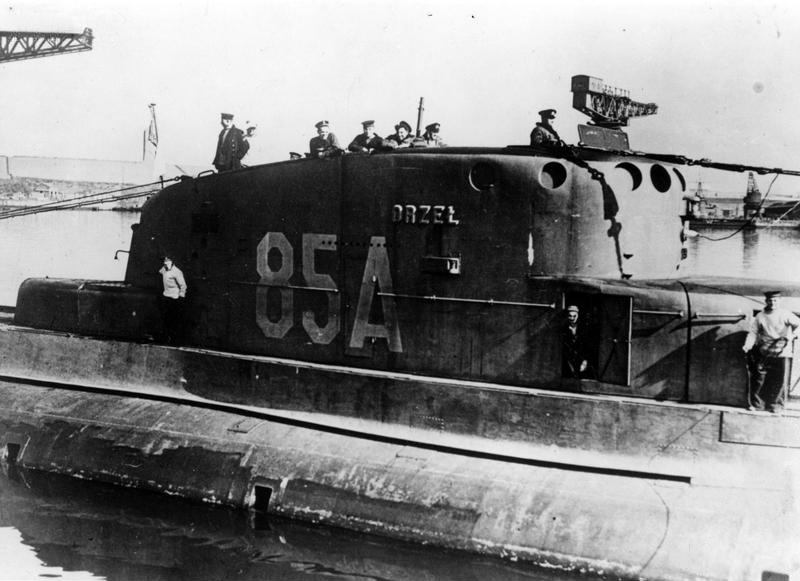
Bridge fairwater of the Polish submarine ORP Orzeł in 1940

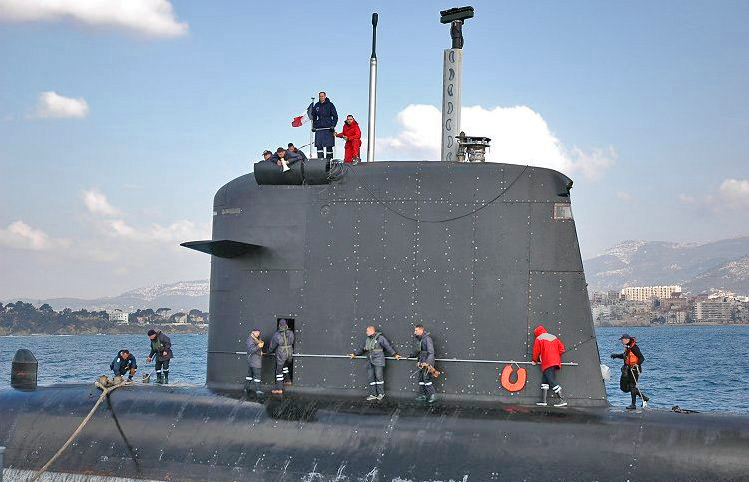
The sail of the French submarine Casabianca

Early naval submarines were typically fitted with a small watertight protrusion on top of their hulls, from which the boat's crew could observe their surroundings through a number of viewports.

As larger and larger submarines were made, and eventually fitted with periscopes, this protrusion grew into a small pressure-hull of its own, typically connected to the control room inside the boat's main pressure-hull via a watertight hatch to mitigate the risk of flooding if the viewports or periscopes were damaged. Thus, the conning tower effectively became the boat's dedicated attack center, from which the commanding officer would command the boat whilst submerged. Some late 1930s designs even located their hydrophone and RADAR operators' stations inside this compartment to maximize the commander's situational awareness.

In addition to their primary purpose, conning towers also served as elevated attachment points for air intakes, magnetic compasses, and even collapsible open air bridges. As conning towers were eventually built large enough that crewmen could comfortably stand on top of them, the collapsible bridges gave way to fixed structures, leading to the development of the so-called "bridge fairwater". To clarify:

- The conning tower is the small watertight compartment above the control room, from which the boat's commanding officer would command the boat during submerged attacks.
- The bridge was built on top of—but not considered part of—the conning tower, and was used for surfaced navigation and signalling.
- The fairwater is a streamlined casing around the conning tower and/or around the bridge. The tapering aft end of this casing also provided a sheltered location for the boat's air intakes, as well as an elevated base for various AA gun (anti-aircraft) platforms.

In the post-1950s era, an increased focus on deep submerged operation, together with improvements in technology that allowed periscopes to be made longer, removed the need for a raised conning station. USS Triton (laid down 1956) was the last US submarine to have a conning tower, after which the conning tower's function as an attack center was integrated into the control rooms of subsequent designs.
