= Ralph Kerr =

Royal Navy officer (1891-1941)

Captain Ralph Kerr CBE
- Born: 16 August 1891
- Died: 24 May 1941 (aged 49); Aboard HMS Hood in the Denmark Strait
- Military career
- Allegiance: United Kingdom
- Branch: Royal Navy
- Service years: 1904 – 1941
- Rank: Captain
- Commands: HMS Cossack; HMS Windsor; HMS Thruster; HMS Decoy; Senior Officer, Reserve Fleet; HMS Duncan; HMS Hardy; HMS Broke; HMS Hood
- Conflicts: World War I: Battle of Jutland; World War II: Atlantic War; Operation Rheinübung; Battle of the Denmark Strait †
- Awards: Commander of the Order of the British Empire (CBE)

Captain Ralph Kerr CBE (16 August 1891 – 24 May 1941) was an officer in the Royal Navy. He served in the First and Second World Wars, and was killed in the sinking of HMS Hood by the German battleship Bismarck at the Battle of the Denmark Strait.

== Early life ==
Kerr was born on 16 August 1891, the only son of Lieutenant-Colonel Sir Russell Kerr, and his wife Lady Kerr, of Newnham on Severn, Gloucestershire. He joined the Royal Navy on 15 May 1904, and after service as a cadet he rose through the ranks, being promoted to Lieutenant on 28 February 1914. He served in the First World War, spending most of the period aboard the battleship HMS Benbow, the flagship of Admiral Sir Doveton Sturdee. He was present at the Battle of Jutland in May 1916, and by 1918 he had been given his own command, that of the destroyer HMS Cossack.

== With the destroyers ==
Kerr was promoted to commander on 30 June 1927, and in December 1928 he was given command of the destroyer HMS Windsor, followed by HMS Thruster in August 1929. He commanded Thruster until February 1931, and after a year on land, returned to sea in February 1932 in command of HMS Decoy. Promotion to captain followed on 30 June 1935, and on 6 September 1935 he became commander of the Flotilla leader and captain (D) of the 21st Destroyer Flotilla. He stepped down from the position on 22 May 1936. His commander, Admiral Thomson, reported that he had found Kerr to be

"A very capable Captain (D) who has trained his Flotilla well. An officer probably much better suited to the practical side of naval life rather than to Staff duties. A strong personality with definite powers of command and a very good seaman. Most loyal and is very thorough in the carrying out of his duties. Social qualities good. Physically fit and has good powers of endurance."

Kerr became senior officer, Reserve Fleet aboard HMS Caledon in July 1936, transferring to HMS Colombo on 3 November 1936. As well as being the senior officer of the reserve fleet he then also became chief staff officer to the rear-admiral of the 10th Cruiser Squadron, where he remained for the next year, until July 1937. Vice-Admiral Sir Gerald Dickens also produced a highly favourable report, noting that Kerr was

"A very keen zealous officer who has done well as Senior Officer Reserve Fleet. Has plenty of character and drive and is mentally alert. A good seaman and a sound administrator. Very loyal, while ambitious to do well. Good social qualities. Keeps fit."

Kerr was to have then received an appointment to command the Flotilla leader HMS Duncan, where he would be captain (D) of the 8th Destroyer Flotilla. The appointment was cancelled before he could take it up, however. Instead, after a period of training, he became commander of HMS Hardy and captain (D) of the 2nd Destroyer Flotilla. During this period he served under Vice-Admiral John Tovey, and impressed both him, and the Commander-in-Chief Mediterranean Admiral Sir Dudley Pound. Kerr then took command of HMS Broke and the 15th Destroyer Flotilla, later transferring to the shore establishment HMS Cochrane, at Rosyth on 30 August 1939. He remained at Rosyth with the Rosyth Destroyer Force until 24 January 1940, spending time on the staff of the commander-in-chief, Rosyth. He was awarded the CBE in 1940.

== HMS Hood ==
Kerr took command of the battlecruiser HMS Hood on 15 February 1941. Command of the Navy's largest capital ship was a major change, Kerr having only previously commanded destroyers. He took her to sea on the completion of her refit in mid March, and carried out gunnery exercises and patrols off Iceland. He was commander of Hood for just three months, when he was killed at the Battle of the Denmark Strait, along with most of his crew, when Hood was sunk by the German battleship Bismarck. He was posthumously mentioned in dispatches. Kerr is commemorated on Portsmouth Naval Memorial.

== Family ==
He had married Margaret Augusta Kerr on 14 February 1920, the marriage producing two children, Russell and Jane. They resided in St John's Wood, London. Russell Kerr, who had served as a captain in the Royal Artillery and as a tank commander, was killed while fighting in Burma in 1945.
