= John Leach (Royal Navy officer) =

Royal Navy officer (1894–1941)

Captain John Leach DSO MVO
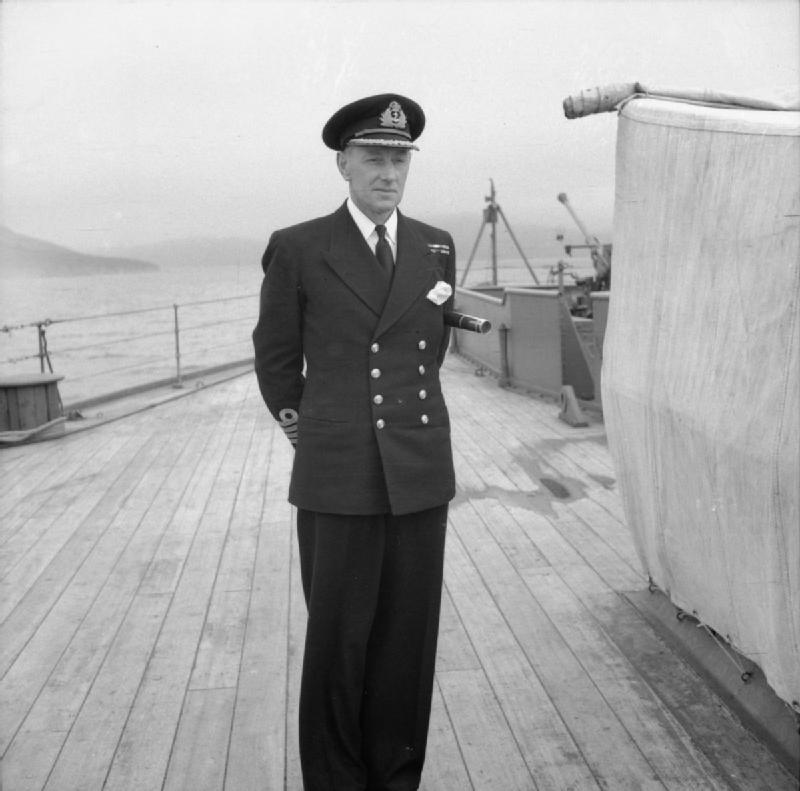
- Captain John Leach on the deck of HMS Prince of Wales in 1941
- Born: 1 September 1894
- Died: 10 December 1941 (aged 47); HMS Prince of Wales, South China Sea, off Kuantan, Malaya
- Relatives: Sir Henry Leach (son)
- Military career
- Allegiance: United Kingdom
- Branch: Royal Navy
- Service years: 1907–1941
- Rank: Captain
- Commands: HMS Prince of Wales (1941); HMS Cumberland (1936–38)
- Conflicts: First World War; Second World War; Atlantic War; Operation Rheinübung; Battle of the Denmark Strait; Pacific War; Malayan campaign; Sinking of Prince of Wales and Repulse †
- Awards: Distinguished Service Order; Member of the Royal Victorian Order

Captain John Catterall Leach, DSO, MVO (1 September 1894 – 10 December 1941) was a British naval officer. He was the only captain of the battleship HMS Prince of Wales during its short period in service.

== Early life and career ==
The son of Charles Rothwell Leach, a solicitor, Leach entered the Royal Naval College, Osborne as a cadet in 1907 and served in the Royal Navy during the First World War.

== Bismarck ==
Very soon after Prince of Wales entered active service in 1941, the ship fought under Leach's command in the Battle of the Denmark Strait, and suffered damage fighting the German battleship Bismarck. However, damage inflicted by Prince of Wales caused Bismarck to lose fuel, forcing the latter to attempt to return to a base in occupied France.

Despite a proposal to court-martial Leach for breaking off the action with Bismarck after Hood had sunk, (Note: Kennedy expounds on the court martial claim via the epilogue in Pursuit - The Sinking of the Bismarck. According to Kennedy the claim for a proposal to court martial Leach came from post war letters written by Admiral Tovey, after he retired, and not from Admiralty sources. Kennedy states in his epilogue that "...later in life Tovey's memory let him down..." and that plus the fact that Leach was retained in his command and given a commendation must cast considerable doubt on the court martial proposal.) he was awarded the Distinguished Service Order for his part. In the 1960 film Sink the Bismarck! Leach was played by actor Esmond Knight, who had been on the bridge of Prince of Wales' with Leach during the Battle of the Denmark Strait and was partially blinded when the ship was hit by Bismarck's gunfire.

== Force Z ==
In late 1941, Prince of Wales formed part of Force Z sent to Singapore. Off the coast of Malaya, she was sunk by the Japanese. Leach died in the sinking. His son was Admiral of the Fleet Sir Henry Leach (1923–2011), who was First Sea Lord during the Falklands War.

== Bibliography ==
- Chesneau, Roger (2004). King George V Battleships. ShipCraft. Vol. 2. London: Chatham Publishing. ISBN 1-86176-211-9.
- Hein, David. "Vulnerable: HMS Prince of Wales in 1941". Journal of Military History 77, no. 3 (July 2013): 955–989. Abstract online: https://www.smh-hq.org/jmh/jmhvols/773.html
- Garzke, William H.; Dulin, Robert O. (1985). Battleships: Axis and Neutral Battleships in World War II. Annapolis: Naval Institute Press. ISBN 978-0-87021-101-0.
- Willis, Matthew B. 'In the Highest Traditions of the Royal Navy: The Life of Captain John Leach, MVO, DSO'. The History Press, 2011.
