= Battle of the Denmark Strait =

Naval battle during the Second World War

Coordinates: 63°20′N 31°50′W

- Part of Operation Rheinübung
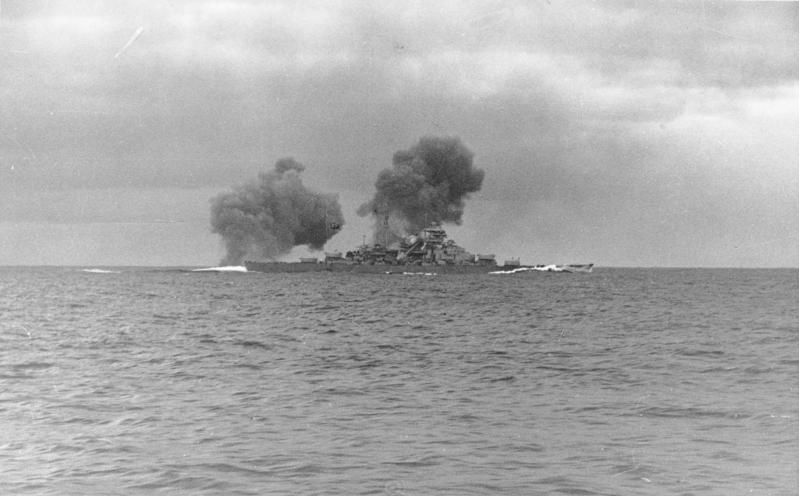
- Bismarck firing at HMS Prince of Wales on 24 May 1941
| Date | 24 May 1941 |
| Location | Denmark Strait |
| Result | German victory |

Belligerents
| Germany | United Kingdom |

Commanders and leaders
| (Nazi Germany) Günther Lütjens; (Nazi Germany) Ernst Lindemann; (Nazi Germany) Helmuth Brinkmann | (United Kingdom) Lancelot Holland †; (United Kingdom) John Leach; (United Kingdom) Ralph Kerr †; (United Kingdom) Frederic Wake-Walker |

Strength
| 1 battleship: Bismarck; 1 heavy cruiser: Prinz Eugen | 1 battleship: HMS Prince of Wales; 1 battlecruiser: HMS Hood; 2 heavy cruisers: HMS Norfolk; HMS Suffolk; Did not participate in combat: 6 destroyers (on approach detached evening before battle) |

Casualties and losses
| 5 wounded | HMS Hood sunk; Prince of Wales damaged; 1,428 dead; 9 wounded |

The Battle of the Denmark Strait was a naval engagement in the Second World War, which took place on 24 May 1941 between ships of the Royal Navy and the Kriegsmarine. The British battleship HMS Prince of Wales and the battlecruiser HMS Hood fought the German battleship Bismarck and the heavy cruiser Prinz Eugen, which were attempting to break out into the North Atlantic to attack Allied merchant shipping (Operation Rheinübung) through the Denmark Strait between Greenland and Iceland.

Less than 10 minutes after the British opened fire, a shell from Bismarck struck Hood near her aft ammunition magazines. Soon afterwards, Hood exploded and sank within three minutes, with the loss of all but three of her crew. Prince of Wales continued to exchange fire with Bismarck but suffered serious malfunctions in her main armament. The British battleship had only been completed in late March 1941, and used new quadruple gun turrets that were unreliable. Prince of Wales soon broke off the engagement.

The battle was a tactical victory for the Germans, but its effect was short-lived. The damage done to Bismarck's forward fuel tanks forced the abandonment of the breakout and an attempt to escape to dry dock facilities in occupied France, producing an operational victory for the British. Spurred by the loss of Hood, a large British force pursued Bismarck, resulting in her loss three days later.

== Background ==
=== German plans ===
The setting of the battle, at top centre. German movements are in red, British in black, modern boundaries are shown.

In April 1941, the German Kriegsmarine intended to send the recently completed fast battleship Bismarck into the Atlantic Ocean to raid the convoys carrying supplies from North America to Britain. The operation was intended to complement the U-boat attacks on British supply lines during the Battle of the Atlantic. The two fast battleships Scharnhorst and Gneisenau had just completed a similar operation, code-named Berlin, between January and March that year. The number of major warships available to the Germans was limited; Bismarck's sister ship Tirpitz was not yet operational, Scharnhorst was in need of a boiler overhaul after Operation Berlin, and Gneisenau had been damaged by air attacks in early April while in Brest, France. Work on the heavy cruisers Admiral Hipper and Admiral Scheer, both under refit in Germany after their own raiding operations, was delayed by British air attacks that struck supply depots in Kiel. Admiral Günther Lütjens, the fleet commander who was to command German forces during the planned Operation Rheinübung, sought to delay until repairs to Scharnhorst were completed or Tirpitz could join Bismarck, but the Oberkommando der Marine (Naval High Command) instructed Lütjens to begin the operation as soon as possible to keep pressure on Britain's supply lines. As a result, the only vessel available to support Bismarck was the heavy cruiser Prinz Eugen.

=== British plans ===
The British Royal Navy learned of Bismarck's sortie after the Swedish cruiser Gotland spotted the vessels passing through the western Baltic Sea on 20 May; Gotland's report was passed to the British naval attache in Stockholm, who forwarded it to the Admiralty. British reconnaissance aircraft later confirmed the German ship's presence in Norway. Now aware that major German warships were at sea with the intention of breaking for the Atlantic, the Royal Navy began to dispatch vessels to patrol the likely routes, including the heavy cruisers HMS Norfolk and Suffolk to cover the Denmark Strait between Greenland and Iceland. Another group, consisting of the battleship Prince of Wales, the battlecruiser Hood, and a screen of six destroyers, Electra, Achates, Antelope, Anthony, Echo and Icarus, under the command of Vice-Admiral Lancelot Holland in Hood, cruised to the south of Iceland to intercept the Germans once they were detected. Norfolk and Suffolk spotted Bismarck and Prinz Eugen on the evening of 23 May; Suffolk was fitted with radar that allowed them to shadow the Germans through the night whilst remaining outside of German gun range.

Prince of Wales was a newly commissioned King George V-class battleship, similar to Bismarck in size and power. Prince of Wales had not yet been properly "shaken down", and her crew was inexperienced. She still had mechanical problems, especially with her main armament. The ship had sailed with shipyard workers still aboard working on her. (Note: When Bismarck and Prinz Eugen first sighted her in the Denmark Strait, they identified her as King George V, as they believed Prince of Wales could not yet have put to sea.)

For 20 years after her commissioning in 1920, Hood was the largest and heaviest warship in the world. Combining eight large BL 15-inch Mk I naval guns with a top speed greater than any battleship on the sea, Hood was the pride of Great Britain's navy, and embodied the world dominance of British naval power. Despite this, Hood had a serious shortcoming compared to the super-dreadnought battleships she served alongside: as a battlecruiser, much of her bulk was dedicated to extra engine power instead of comprehensive armour coverage. This came from her design as an Admiral-class battlecruiser to meet the threat of the German Mackensen-class battlecruisers during World War I.

While her 12 inches (300 mm) of belt armour was considered sufficient against most capital ships she was likely to encounter, her 3 inches (76 mm) of deck armour left her vulnerable to plunging fire at long range. At the time of her commissioning in World War I, naval gunnery was severely inaccurate at the ranges necessary to produce plunging fire, and Hood's greater speed and maneuverability were seen as an acceptable trade-off. This approach was proved to be flawed after the loss of HMS Indefatigable at the Battle of Jutland and combined with the accuracy of naval gunfire increasing in the inter-war period, Hood was eventually scheduled to receive an upgrade in 1939 that would have doubled her deck armour to 6 inches (150 mm), but the outbreak of World War II meant the upgrade never took place. She thus sortied to war at a marked disadvantage against the new capital ships of the Axis powers.

Aware of Hood's inadequate protective armour, distant to the southeast of where the battle took place, Holland's superior (Admiral Sir John Tovey) considered ordering him to have Prince of Wales sail ahead of Hood. With the ships in this position, Tovey concluded the better-protected Prince of Wales could draw the German battleships' large-shell gunfire. Ultimately, Tovey did not give the order, later saying "I did not feel such interference with such a senior officer justified."

== Prelude ==
=== Both plans go awry ===
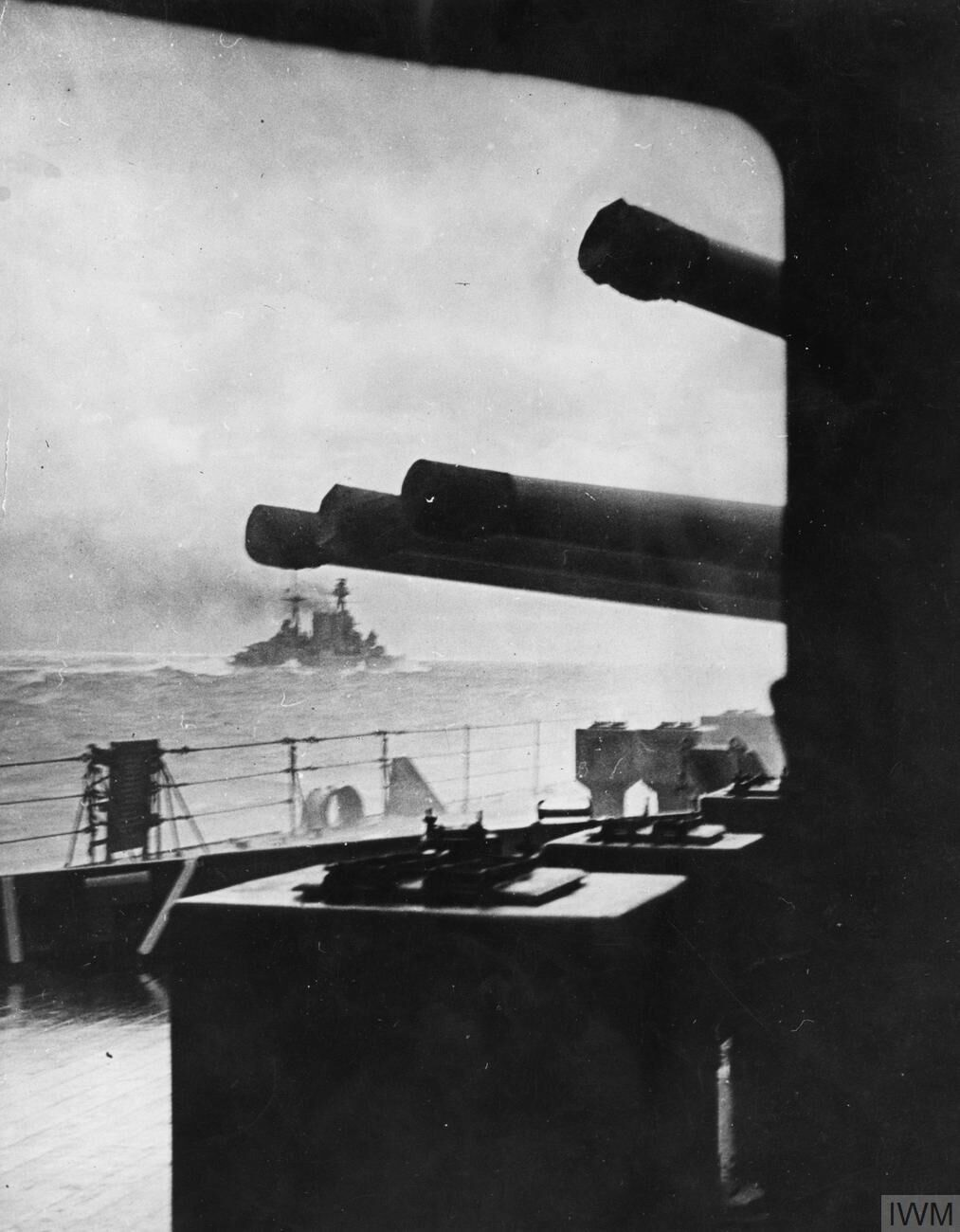
The last picture of Hood as a fighting unit. The four guns in the foreground are those of Prince of Wales's 'A' turret.

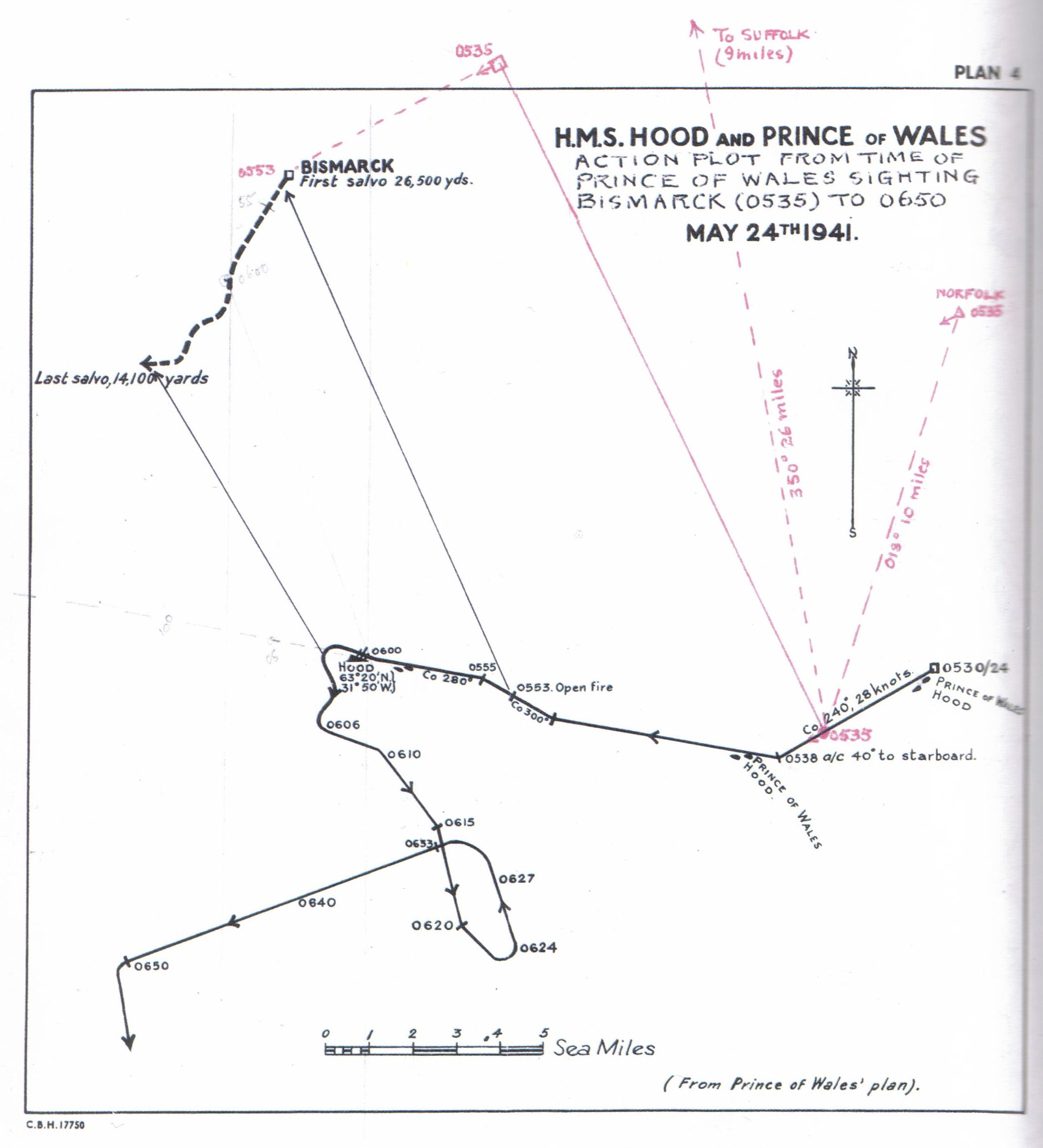
The original track chart of HMS Prince of Wales for the battle of the Denmark Strait, with manuscript additions

The Kriegsmarine had hoped that the Bismarck force would enter onto trans-Atlantic commerce raiding, from the Norwegian Sea via the Denmark Strait, undetected and unopposed. The Germans based this hope upon a transit from German territorial waters on the North Sea; and, through the territorial waters of German-occupied Norway into the Norwegian Sea, undetected by aerial searches; neutral ship encounters; and traditional "coast-watching" observations performed by formal and informal efforts of maritime intelligence gathering, in the neutral and occupied countries surrounding the North Sea.

In the event, the ground-level coast-watching observations from both neutral and occupied territories identified the principal combatant units sortied for the Exercise Rhine operation from the moment they left German territorial waters. The combatants (Bismarck and Prinz Eugen) were identified by in-country coast-watchers located in Denmark; who were able to identify the ships and communicate with their clandestine contacts, the dates and times of the German surface units, moving in their designated coast-watch areas of responsibility.

The HSwMS Gotland spotted the transit of Bismarck and Prinz Eugen in the normal shipping lanes in the North Sea, and reported the movement to the Swedish authorities. Swedish territory as well hosted individual ground-level coast watchers who were able to follow and report on movements in Swedish coastal waters. These observations were passed directly to Royal Navy intelligence by routine maritime diplomatic channels maintained by the British naval attaché in Stockholm. Thus, when Bismarck and her escort moved into the unoccupied fjords of German-occupied Norway, for final coastal refuelling and topping off of ships' stores and supplies, the RAF (weather permitting) was able to keep a final watch on the location and timing of the German raider force.

Holland's battle plan was to have Hood and Prince of Wales engage Bismarck while Suffolk and Norfolk engaged Prinz Eugen (which, Holland assumed, still steamed behind Bismarck and not ahead of her). He signalled this to Captain John C. Leach of Prince of Wales but did not radio Rear-Admiral Wake-Walker, who as Commander of the 1st Cruiser Squadron directed Suffolk and Norfolk, for fear of disclosing his location. Instead, he observed radio silence. Holland hoped to meet the enemy at approximately 02:00. Sunset in this latitude was at 01:51 (ship's clocks were four hours ahead of local time). Bismarck and Prinz Eugen would be silhouetted against the sun's afterglow while Hood and Prince of Wales could approach rapidly, unseen in the darkness, to a range close enough not to endanger Hood with plunging fire from Bismarck. The Germans would not expect an attack from this quarter, giving the British the advantage of surprise.

The plan's success depended on Suffolk's continually unbroken contact with the German ships. However, Suffolk lost contact from 00:28. For 90 minutes, Holland neither sighted the German ships nor received any further news from Norfolk or Suffolk. Reluctantly, Holland ordered Hood and Prince of Wales to turn south-southwest but he detached his destroyers which continued searching to the north. However, the loss of contact should be understood as temporary and tactical only; and not strategic in terms of the tactical outcome. Suffolk lost contact with its reconnaissance target (the enemy fleet) in what was essentially a closed, confined rectangular space; aligned generally northeast (the entrance to the Denmark Strait) to southwest (the exit of the Strait into the Atlantic). The enemy units were firmly constrained by the Greenland ice pack to the north, and the extensive Royal Navy minefield to the south along the coast of Iceland, then under British occupation. Given the prior warning of the German sortie, there was ample time for the Royal Navy to place armed reconnaissance at both ends of this narrow alignment. Suffolk and Norfolk were at the eastern entrance to the Strait (where contact was made immediately upon Bismarck's entry). Holland was waiting at the western end as the Bismarck force exited the Strait.

Strategically, it was an unquestioned fact (including the approximate timing) that Bismarck's and Prinz Eugen's entrance into the Atlantic (the fundamental objective of Rhine Exercise), was known from the moment the fleet left German territorial waters. And that was a long enough time span before the fleet's final fitting out for transit to the Denmark Strait, that Lütjens could not have helped but to realize, that his force would not under any circumstance enter the Atlantic undetected nor would it enter unopposed. And by the time it was opposed, it would occur with forces that would likely ensure his fleet's ultimate destruction. And such destruction would take place before any supply convoy units (the whole purpose of the operation) were threatened by Operation Rhine Exercise.

Before contact was re-established, the two squadrons missed each other narrowly. Had the German ships not altered course to the west at 01:41 to follow the line of the Greenland icepack, the British would have intercepted them much earlier than they did. The British destroyers were just 10 mi (8.7 nmi; 16 km) to the southeast when the Germans made this course change. If the visibility had not been reduced to 3–5 mi (2.6–4.3 nmi; 4.8–8.0 km), the German vessels would probably have been spotted (since generally on a calm, clear day ship lookouts can observe large objects and ships about 12 miles (19 km) distant on the horizon. And if the ship's lookouts are in a crow's nest, the observable distance is even farther).

Just before 03:00, Suffolk regained contact with Bismarck. Hood and Prince of Wales were 35 mi (30 nmi; 56 km) away, slightly ahead of the Germans. Holland signalled to steer toward the Germans and increased speed to 28 kn (32 mph; 52 km/h). Suffolk's loss of contact had placed the British at a disadvantage. Instead of the swiftly closing head-on approach Holland had envisioned, he would have to converge at a wider angle, much more slowly. This would leave Hood vulnerable to Bismarck's plunging shells for a much longer period. The situation worsened further when, at 03:20, Suffolk reported that the Germans had made a further course alteration to the west, placing the German and British squadrons almost abeam of each other.

At 05:35, lookouts on Prince of Wales spotted the German ships 17 mi (15 nmi; 27 km) away. The Germans, already alerted to the British presence through their hydrophonic equipment, picked up the smoke and masts of the British ships 10 minutes later. At this point, Holland had the options of joining Suffolk in shadowing Bismarck and waiting for Tovey to arrive with King George V and other ships to attack, or ordering his squadron into action. He chose the latter at 05:37. The rough seas in the Strait kept the destroyers' role to a minimum and the cruisers Norfolk and Suffolk would be too far behind the German force to reach the battle.

== Battle ==
=== Opening moves ===
Hood opened fire at 05:52.5 at a distance of approximately 26,500 yd (24,200 m). Holland had ordered firing to begin on the leading ship, Prinz Eugen, believing from her position that she was Bismarck. Holland soon amended his order and directed both ships to engage the rear ship, Bismarck. Prince of Wales had already identified and engaged Bismarck, whereas Hood is believed to have continued to fire at Prinz Eugen for some time.

Holland was a gunnery expert; he was well aware of the danger posed by Hood's thin deck armour, which offered weak protection against vertical plunging fire. Holland therefore wanted to reduce the range as quickly as possible, because at a shorter range the trajectory of Bismarck's shells would be flatter, and the shells would therefore be more likely to hit the armour belt protecting the sides of the ship or glance off the top deck, rather than penetrate vertically though the deck armour. Holland closed the range at an angle that placed the German ships too far forward of the beam, which meant that only 10 of the 18 British heavy guns could train and presented the Germans with a bigger target than necessary. One of Prince of Wales' forward guns became unserviceable after the first salvo, leaving only 9 still firing. Suffolk and Norfolk tried to engage Bismarck during the action but both were out of range and had an insufficient speed advantage over Bismarck to rapidly close the range.

The Germans also had the weather gauge, meaning that the British ships were steaming into the wind, with spray drenching the lenses of Prince of Wales' "A" turret's 42 ft (13 m) Barr and Stroud coincidence rangefinder and both British ships' "B" turret 30 ft (9.1 m) rangefinders. (Note: "A" turret was the furthest forward turret with "B" behind and above it. At the rear "Y" was the furthest aft with "X" behind and above, if present - the Prince of Wales did not have an "X" turret) The shorter based (15 ft (4.6 m)) ones in the director towers had to be used instead. Holland had Prince of Wales stay close to Hood, conforming to Hood's movements instead of varying course and speed, which made it easier for the Germans to find the range to both British ships. It would have aided Holland's gunners if they had both fired upon Bismarck as originally planned, since they could time precisely each other's salvos to avoid mistaking one ship's fire for the other. The British could also use Concentration Fire, where both ships' main armament salvos would be controlled by one ship's fire control computer—probably Prince of Wales' modern Admiralty Fire Control Table. All four ships, Bismarck, Prinz Eugen, Hood and Prince of Wales were fitted with gunnery radar: It seems likely that both German ships used their radar systems to obtain accurate ranges during the engagement, but the brand new radar systems fitted to Prince of Wales failed to obtain any radar ranges from her Type 284 or Type 281 radars. Prinz Eugen's war diary states that Bismarck and Prinz Eugen cooperated to maintain radar surveillance just prior to the engagement, indicating functional radar on both German ships.

Prince of Wales struck her target first. She would ultimately hit Bismarck three times. One shell struck the commander's boat and put the seaplane catapult amidships out of action (the latter damage not being discovered until much later, during an attempt to fly off the ship's War Diary on the eve of her final battle). The second shell passed through the bow from one side to the other without exploding. The third struck the hull underwater and burst inside the ship, flooding a generator room and damaging the bulkhead to an adjoining boiler room, partially flooding it. The last two hits caused damage to Bismarck's machinery and medium flooding. The hit also severed a steam line and wounded five of Bismarck's crew by scalding. The damage to the bow cut access to 1,000 long tons (1,000 t) of fuel oil in the forward fuel tanks, caused Bismarck to leave an oil slick and reduced her speed by 2 kn (2.3 mph; 3.7 km/h). Bismarck was soon listing 9° to port and lost 2 m (6.6 ft) of freeboard at her bow.

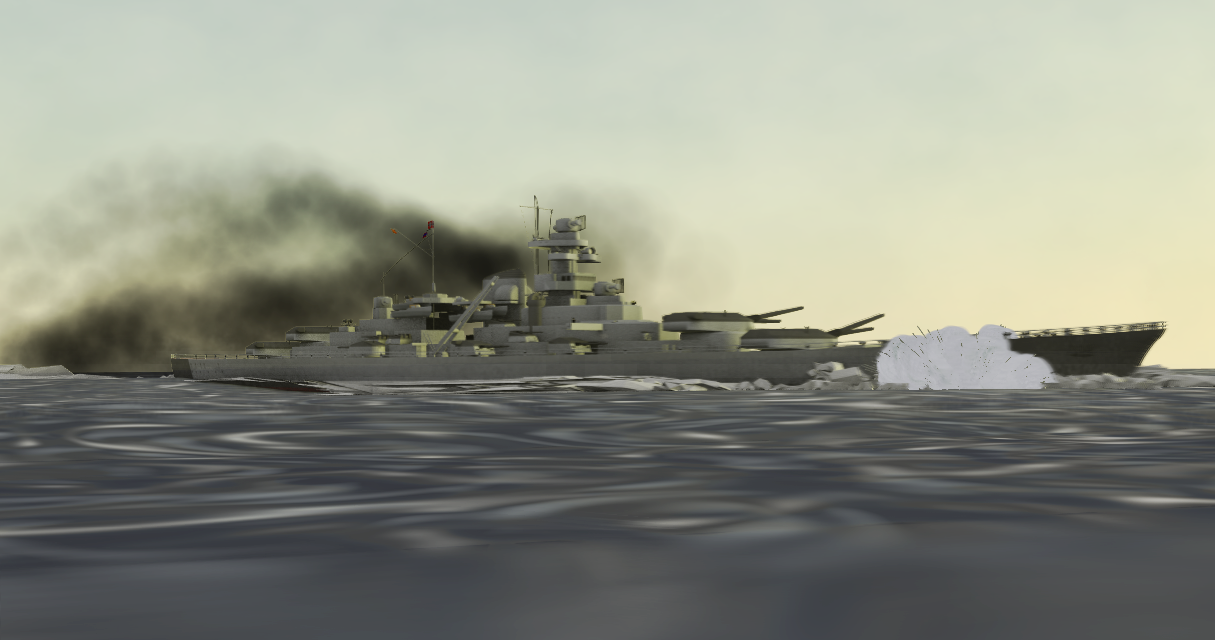
A modern reconstruction showing a 14-inch shell from HMS Prince of Wales penetrating Bismarck's bow.

The Germans opened fire after the first salvo fired by Hood, with Bismarck firing, followed by Prinz Eugen when both German ships fired on Hood. British sources state that Bismarck opened fire at approximately 05:53. Prinz Eugen's War Diary implies an open fire time for Bismarck of 05:55 and definitely states 05:55 for Prinz Eugen. Bismark made a radio signal at 05:52 stating: "...am in a fight with two heavy units". Lütjens may not have immediately given the order to begin firing: Bismarck's first gunnery officer, Korvettenkapitän Adalbert Schneider, asked "Frage Feuererlaubnis?" (Permission to open fire?) several times without receiving a response, until the captain of Bismarck, Kapitän zur See Ernst Lindemann, impatiently responded: "Ich lasse mir doch nicht mein Schiff unter dem Arsch wegschießen. Feuererlaubnis!" (I'm not letting my ship get shot out from under my arse. Permission to fire!)

A shell hit Hood's boat deck, starting a sizable fire in the ready-use 4 in (100 mm) ammunition store, but this fire did not spread to other areas of the ship or cause the later explosion. It is possible that Hood was struck again at the base of her bridge and in her foretop radar director. There has been contention over which German vessel struck Hood; Prinz Eugen (Kapitän zur See Helmuth Brinkmann), was firing at Prince of Wales, following an order from the fleet commander. The Gunnery Officer of Prinz Eugen, Paul Schmalenbach is quoted as saying that Prinz Eugen's target was Hood.

=== Sinking of Hood ===
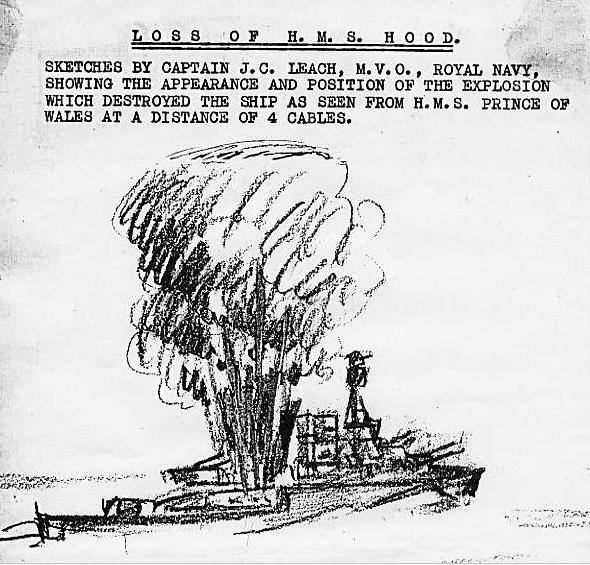
A sketch prepared by Captain JC Leach (commanding HMS Prince of Wales) for the 2nd Board of Enquiry, 1941. The sketch represents the column of smoke or flame that erupted from the vicinity of the mainmast immediately before a huge detonation which obliterated the after part of the ship from view. This phenomenon is believed to have been the result of a cordite fire venting through the engine-room ventilators (see article).

At 06:00, Holland ordered his force to turn once again to port to ensure that the aft main guns on both Hood and Prince of Wales could bear on the German ships. In terms of the force balance this would nominally give Holland's force the advantage of 18 large caliber (14/15 in.) guns (10 in Prince of Wales, 8 in Hood); to 8 (8 - 15 in. in Bismarck).

During the turn, a salvo from Bismarck, fired from about 9 mi (7.8 nmi; 14 km), was seen by men aboard Prince of Wales to straddle Hood abreast her mainmast. This straddle meant that some of the salvos fell to port, some to starboard (of the hull), and some precisely aligned over the center of the main deck of Hood. It is likely that one 38 cm (15 in) shell struck somewhere between Hood's mainmast and "X" turret aft of the mast. A huge pillar of flame shot upward 'like a giant blowtorch' in the vicinity of the mainmast. (Note: Allan and Bevand, The Pursuit of Bismarck & the Sinking of H.M.S. Hood. Despite maintaining a high rate of fire Hood scored no hits during the engagement and she appears to have continued to engage Prinz Eugen throughout the action.)

This was followed by an explosion that destroyed a large portion of the ship from amidships clear to the rear of "Y" turret, blowing both aft turrets into the sea. The ship broke in two and the stern fell away and sank. Ted Briggs, one of the survivors, claimed Hood heeled to 30 degrees at which point 'we knew she just wasn't coming back'. The bow rose clear of the water, pointed upward, pivoted about and sank shortly after the stern. "A" turret fired a salvo while in this upright position, possibly from the doomed gun crew, just before the bow section sank.

Splinters rained down on Prince of Wales .5 mi (0.43 nmi; 0.80 km) away. Hood sank in about three minutes with 1,415 members of the crew. Only Ted Briggs, Bob Tilburn and Bill Dundas survived to be rescued two hours later by the destroyer HMS Electra.

The Admiralty later concluded that the most likely explanation for the loss of Hood was a penetration of her magazines by a 38 cm (15 in) shell from Bismarck, causing the explosion.

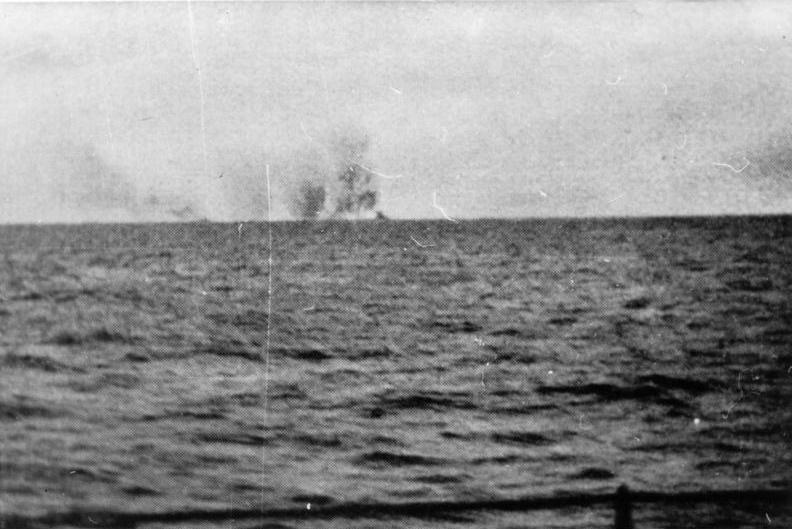
A photo taken from the Prinz Eugen shows the Hood exploding in the far distance with the Prince of Wales nearby

The wreck of Hood revealed the bow section bereft of any structure. A huge section of her side is missing, from the 'A' barbette to the foredeck. The midship section had its plates curled outward. Moreover, the main parts of the forward structure, including the 600 long tons (610 t) conning tower, were found about 1.1 km (0.59 nmi; 0.68 mi) away from the main wreckage. This has sparked theories that the 15 in (380 mm) forward magazines exploded as a result of the force, flames and pressure, caused by the detonation of the aft magazines. However, a team of marine forensic scientists has found that implosion damage to the forward hull due to the rapid sinking of the Hood, is the most likely cause of the state of the forward hull, and they do not support any theory that the forward magazines exploded.

=== Prince of Wales alone ===
Prince of Wales found herself steering towards the sinking Hood. Her commanding officer, Captain Leach, ordered an emergency avoidance turn away from Hood's wreckage. This violent change of course disrupted her aim and put her in a position that made it easier for the Germans to target her. She resumed her previous course but was now under the concentrated fire of both German ships. Prince of Wales was struck four times by Bismarck and three times by Prinz Eugen. One shell passed through her upper superstructure, killing or wounding several crewmen in the Compass Platform and Air Defence Platform. Pieces of another shell struck her radar office aft, killing the crewmen within.

A 20.3 cm (8.0 in) shell from Prinz Eugen found its way to the propelling charge/round manipulation chamber below the aft 5.25 in (133 mm) gun turrets, and a 38 cm (15 in) shell from Bismarck hit underwater below the armour belt, penetrating about 13 ft (4.0 m) into the ship's hull, about 25 ft (7.6 m) below the waterline, but was stopped by the anti-torpedo bulkhead. Fortunately for Prince of Wales, neither shell exploded, but she still suffered minor flooding and the loss of some fuel oil.

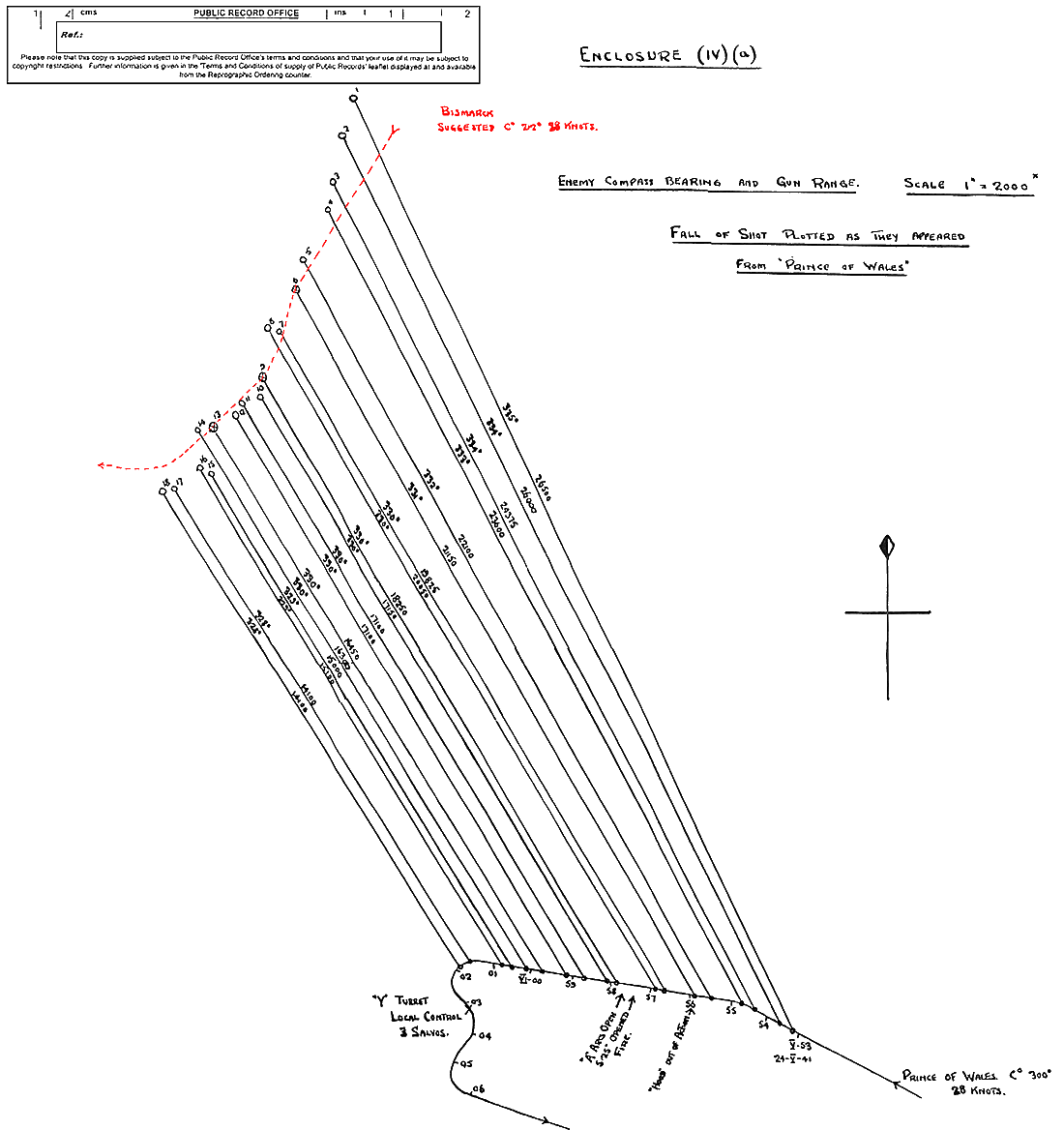
The original gunnery plot of HMS Prince of Wales for the battle of the Denmark Strait. This shows the ranges and bearings of the 18 salvos fired by Prince of Wales under director fire control between 05:53 and 06:02. Three salvos fired by "Y" turret under local control are not shown. The track of Bismarck (in red) is a post-battle estimate.

By this time, serious gunnery malfunctions had caused intermittent problems with the main armament, leading to a 26% reduction in output. (Note: Problems in Prince of Wales turrets during her first action against Bismarck, according to her Gunnery Aspects Report: "A" Turret: No. 1 gun failed after the 1st salvo, from a previously known defect. No. 2 and No. 4 guns suffered from intermittent safety interlock problems. "A" turret suffered from water entering the lower portion of the turret/barbette structure, but there is no indication that this caused any problems other than discomfort for the crew. At Salvo 18, when Prince of Wales turned away, three of 'A' turret's guns were in operation. "B" Turret: No problems reported. At Salvo 18, when Prince of Wales turned away, both of 'B' turrets guns were in operation. "Y" Turret No.2 gun had loading problems and missed salvo 14 onwards. No.3 gun had problems with safety interlocks causing it to miss salvos 15 to 20. At salvo 18, when Prince of Wales turned away, two of "Y" turrets guns were in operation. "Y" turrets shell transfer ring jammed at salvo 20, due to a shell sliding out of its tray due to the motion of the ship as Prince of Wales turned. In summary, three guns in "A" turret, two guns in "B" turret, and two guns in "Y" turret were in operation at salvo 18 when Prince of Wales turned away, for a total of seven guns in operation.) (Note: Bismarck and Prinz Eugen also suffered a loss of output. Bismarck had a "total 104 possible shots Actually fired 93". Prinz Eugen "Total 184 possible shots Actually fired 157".) According to Captain Leach, he decided that continuing the action would risk losing Prince of Wales without inflicting further damage on the enemy. He, therefore, ordered the ship to make smoke and withdraw, 'pending a more favourable opportunity'. Prince of Wales turned away just after 06:04, firing from her rear turret under local control until the turret suffered a jammed shell ring, (Note: . The shell ring is a revolving metal tray that permits shells to be transferred from the magazine into the revolving structure of the turret.) cutting off the ammunition supply and leaving the guns inoperable.

Two of the guns were serviceable by 07:20 but despite the efforts by crew members and civilian technicians to repair the shell ring, it was not until 08:25 that all four guns were back in service. This temporarily left only five (Note: "As Prince of Wales turned away at 06:13, "Y" turret jammed, temporarily leaving only two out of ten 14-inch guns operational":Garzke and Dulin, 1980. p. 190. This is not supported by Bennett, Roskill and ADM 234–509.) 14 in (360 mm) guns operational, but nine of the ten were operational in five hours. The final salvos fired were ragged and are believed to have fallen short. The ship retired from the battle around 06:10. Thirteen of her crew had been killed, nine were wounded. The timing of Prince of Wales' withdrawal was fortunate for her, as she had come into torpedo range of Prinz Eugen and turned away as the German cruiser was about to fire.

=== Breaking off the action ===
On Bismarck there was tremendous elation at the sinking of Hood. There was also a keen expectation that they would close on Prince of Wales and possibly finish her off. Lindemann requested that Lütjens allow Bismarck to do just that. Even if Tovey's squadron had left Scapa Flow the previous day, he would still be more than 300 nmi (350 mi; 560 km) away from Bismarck, even if Bismarck diverted to sink Prince of Wales (a chase Lindemann calculated would take only two or three hours).

Lütjens refused to allow Lindemann to give chase, giving no explanation. Lindemann repeated his request, this time more assertively. Lütjens held firm orders from the German Naval Commander, Großadmiral Erich Raeder, to avoid unnecessary combat with the Royal Navy, especially when it could lead to further damage that could hasten delivering Bismarck toward the waiting hands of the British. He broke off combat instead of pursuing Prince of Wales and ordered a course of 270°, due west. Bismarck had fired 93 of her 353 base-fused Armour Piercing (AP) shells during the engagement.

This clash between the two senior German officers reflected their disparate and distinct command functions. As captain of Bismarck, Lindemann operated first and foremost as a tactician. As such, he had no doubt that his ship's immediate objective was to destroy Prince of Wales, and he had pressed his case as far and hard as he should. Lütjens, as fleet chief and task force commander, operated at the strategic and operational levels. To some degree, his orders were clear: attacking convoys was his priority, not risking "a major engagement for limited, and perhaps uncertain, goals". Nevertheless, Raeder had also ordered Lütjens to be bold and imaginative, to accept battle if unavoidable and conduct it vigorously to the finish.

The reality was that Lütjens' orders did not cover a spectacular success like the one just achieved. His priority therefore was to stick to his instructions: to concentrate on sinking merchant shipping and avoid encounters with enemy warships whenever possible. Moreover, before leaving Germany, Lütjens had told Admirals Conrad Patzig and Wilhelm Marschall, that he would adhere to Raeder's directives. This meant he did not intend to become the third fleet chief to be relieved for contravening Raeder's orders; Marschall, one of his two predecessors, had been relieved of command for not following his orders to the letter despite the fact that Marschall's analysis of the changes in the tactical situation since the orders were issued resulted in the sinking of the British aircraft carrier HMS Glorious and its two escorting destroyers. Nor was he predisposed to discuss his command decisions with a subordinate officer.

Even if he had known it was the untried Prince of Wales he was fighting and not King George V, Lütjens would probably have stuck to his decision. Following her would have meant exposing the squadron to further gunfire as well as to torpedo attacks from Norfolk and Suffolk and the six nearby destroyers. He would have risked his ships and crews on an expressly forbidden opportunity. Lütjens would also have been facing a foe that was still combat effective, despite the hits taken the RN's damage assessment was that damage sustained was limited and caused no significant reduction in combat efficiency.

Between 06:19 and 06:25, Suffolk fired six salvoes in the direction of Bismarck, having mistaken a radar contact with an aircraft for Bismarck. Suffolk was actually out of gun range of both Bismarck and Prinz Eugen at the time.

== Aftermath ==
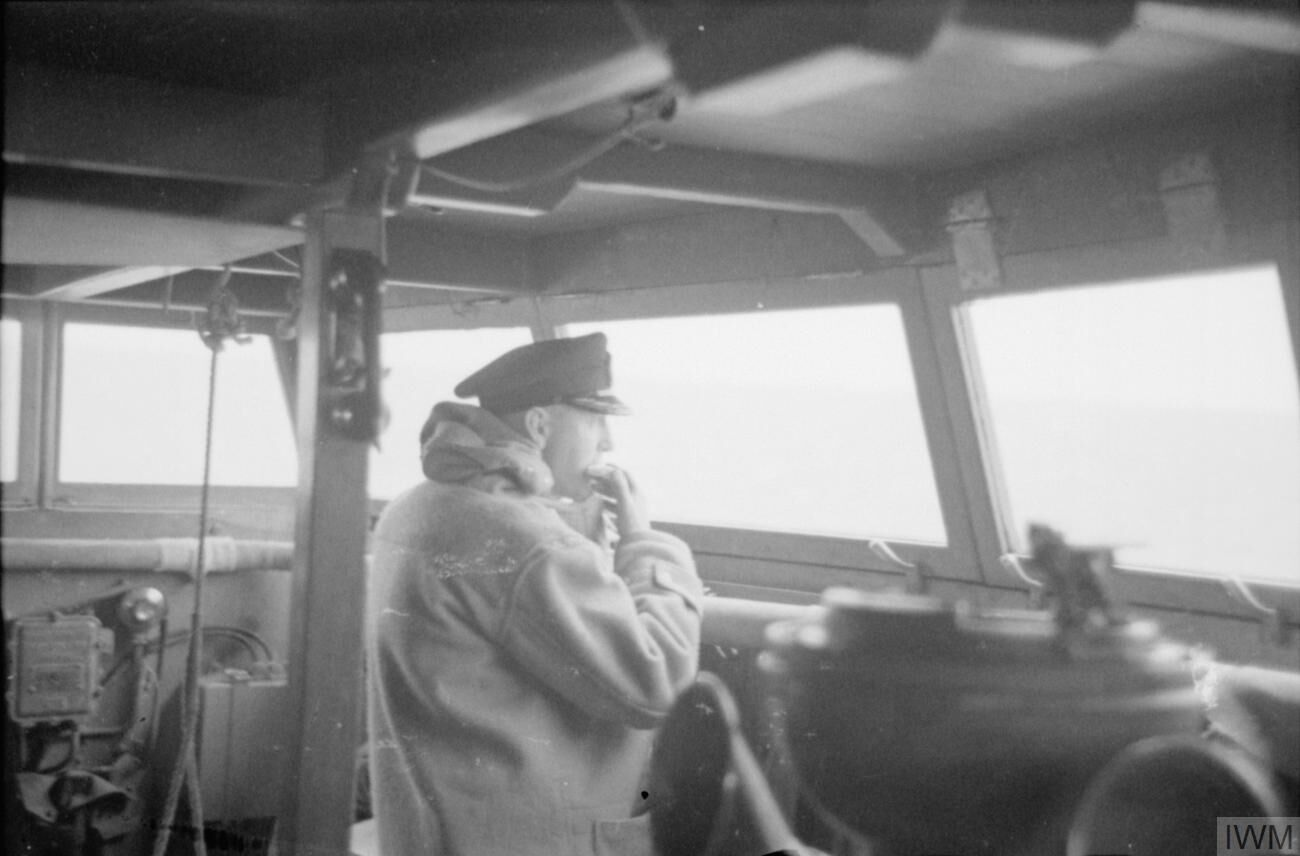
Captain Robert Meyric Ellis of Suffolk remains on the bridge for lunch whilst shadowing Bismarck.

With Holland's death responsibility for Prince of Wales fell to Wake-Walker in Norfolk. With this command came the responsibility of coping with Bismarck until enough British warships could concentrate and destroy her. His choice was either to renew the action with Bismarck, or ensure that she be intercepted and brought to action by other heavy units. Wake-Walker chose the latter course, continuing to shadow the German ships. Further offensive action, he concluded, would cause more damage to Prince of Wales than to Bismarck and endanger his cruisers, and he knew Tovey was on his way. He ordered Prince of Wales to follow Norfolk at her best speed, so that Norfolk and Suffolk could fall back on her if attacked. At 07:57 Suffolk reported that Bismarck had reduced speed and appeared damaged.

Since the first hit to Bismarck's forecastle, all six of the ship's 26-man damage control teams had worked to repair the damage to contain flooding and address severed fuel lines, ultimately causing a change in operational plans. When it was reported that the tips of the starboard propeller could be seen above water, Lindemann had ordered counterflooding two compartments aft to restore the ship's trim. He then sent divers into the forecastle to connect the forward fuel tanks, which contained a much-needed 1,000 long tons (1,000 t) of fuel, first to the tanks near the forward boiler then to the rear fuel tank by way of a provisional line running over the upper deck. Both these manoeuvres failed.

Lindemann then requested permission to slow Bismarck and heel the ship first to one side then the other so that patches could be welded from the inside to the holes in the forward hull. Lütjens refused, again without comment. Eventually, he had to agree to slow the ship to 22 kn (25 mph; 41 km/h) to allow hammocks and collision matting to be stuffed in the holes of the No. 2 boiler room and the auxiliary boiler room to stop the growing ingress of seawater. This attempt also failed. Boiler Room No. 2 was shut down, with a consequent loss of speed to 28 kn (32 mph; 52 km/h).

As well as taking on seawater, Bismarck was leaking fuel oil. Lütjens ordered Prinz Eugen to drop back and see how much of a trail she was leaving astern. The carpet of oil was broad enough to cover both sides of the ship's wake, was all colours of the rainbow and gave off a strong smell, all of which helped disclose Bismarck's location.

The damage to Bismarck's forward fuel tanks, combined with a missed opportunity to refuel at Bergen earlier in the voyage, left less than 3,000 long tons (3,000 t) of fuel remaining, not enough to operate effectively against the Atlantic convoys. The element of surprise – considered essential for the operation's success – had most definitely been lost; the German ships continued to be shadowed by Wake-Walker's squadron. Lütjens concluded that he needed to abort Bismarck's mission and head toward a convenient dockyard for repairs.

The question was which dockyard to head for. The nearest friendly ports were Bergen and Trondheim in Norway, a little over 1,000 mi (870 nmi; 1,600 km) away. Steaming in that direction meant a return passage north or south of Iceland, with the enemy's air forces now fully alerted to their presence and the possibility of other heavy units between them and Scapa Flow. Lütjens knew his intelligence was unreliable. Hood had been reported by Group North to be off West Africa and there had been no reports of a King George V-class battleship in the vicinity.

Disregarding Lindemann's recommendation to return to Bergen, Lütjens ordered Bismarck to head for the French port of Saint-Nazaire. Prince of Wales pursued for several hours and re-engaged on several occasions before the German ships evaded pursuit. Although the French coast was 600 mi (520 nmi; 970 km) further away than Bergen, Saint-Nazaire held the potential of longer nights and wider seas in which to shake off Bismarck's shadowers, plus the possibility of luring them across a line of U-boats. It would leave Bismarck poised on the edge of the British trade routes once the damage were repaired; it also meant the potential support of the battleships Scharnhorst and Gneisenau. Both ships had been stationed at Brest in France, since the end of Operation Berlin earlier that year but had been kept in port for repairs and overhaul. While Brest was closer than Saint-Nazaire, it was within range of Royal Air Force bombers and air raids had damaged Gneisenau

Lütjens detached the undamaged Prinz Eugen to continue raiding on her own. The cruiser went further south into the Atlantic, where she refuelled from a tanker at sea. She suffered engine trouble, abandoned her commerce raiding mission without having sunk any merchant ships, and made it to Brest.

== Reaction ==
=== German ===
News of Lütjens' decision was received with shock in Berlin, Wilhelmshaven and Paris. A blizzard of urgent telephone calls raced across German-occupied Europe. While the Berlin Admiralty was satisfied with Lütjens' success, it was tempered by news of Bismarck's damage and the decision to head for France. Grand Admiral Raeder was not clear whether Lütjens intended to steam for St. Nazaire immediately or after shaking off his pursuers and oiling in mid-Atlantic. Raeder immediately conferred with his chief of staff, Admiral Otto Schniewind, who in turn telephoned Admiral Rolf Carls, who commanded Group North in Wilhelmshaven.

Carls had already drafted a message recalling Lütjens to Germany, but had not yet sent it. Schniewind pointed out that at noon Lütjens had crossed the demarcation line between the Northern Hebrides and Southern Greenland, thus passing from Group North's operational control to Group West; therefore, the decision to recall Lütjens was no longer Carls' to make. A subsequent call to Group West's commander, Admiral Alfred Saalwächter, revealed that he did not plan to recall Lütjens and that he felt such a decision should be discussed between Schniewind and Raeder.

Raeder was against issuing a recall himself, telling Schniewind they did not know enough about the situation at hand and that the person who would best know would be Lütjens. He then telephoned Adolf Hitler, who was at the Obersalzberg in the Bavarian Alps. Hitler received the news of Hood's sinking stoically, exhibiting neither joy nor any other triumphant behaviour. After hearing Raeder's report, he turned to those who were with him and expressed his personal thoughts:

If now these British cruisers are maintaining contact and Lütjens has sunk the Hood and nearly crippled the other, which was brand new and having trouble with her guns during the action, why didn't he sink her too? Why hasn't he tried to get out of there or why hasn't he turned around?

News of Hood's destruction was seized upon more enthusiastically by Dr. Joseph Goebbels' Propaganda Ministry. That evening it was broadcast to the nation, accompanied by "We march against England" and other martial airs. The German public, already enjoying the news of Luftwaffe victories over the Royal Navy off Crete, received the news of Hood's sinking euphorically.

=== British ===
The British public were shocked that their most emblematic warship had been destroyed so suddenly, with the loss of more than 1,400 of her crew. The Admiralty mobilised every available warship in the Atlantic to hunt down and destroy Bismarck. The Royal Navy forces pursued and brought Bismarck to battle. The German battleship was sunk on the morning of 27 May.

Moves were subsequently made to court-martial Wake-Walker and Captain John Leach of Prince of Wales. (Note: Kennedy expounds on the court martial claim via the epilogue in Pursuit - The Sinking of the Bismarck. According to Kennedy the claim for a proposal to court martial Leach and Wake-Walker came from post war letters written by Admiral Tovey, after he retired, and not from Admiralty sources. Kennedy states in his epilogue that "...later in life Tovey's memory let him down..." and that plus the fact that Leach and Wake-Walker were retained in their commands and given commendations must cast considerable doubt on the court martial proposal.) The view was taken that they were wrong not to have continued the battle with Bismarck after Hood had been sunk. John Tovey, Commander-in-Chief of the Home Fleet, was appalled at this criticism. A row ensued between Tovey and his superior, Admiral Sir Dudley Pound. Tovey stated that the two officers had acted correctly, ensuring that the German ships were tracked and not endangering their ships needlessly. Furthermore, Prince of Wales's main guns had repeatedly malfunctioned and she could not have matched Bismarck. Tovey threatened to resign his position and appear at any court-martial as 'defendant's friend' and defence witness. No more was heard of the proposal.

A British board of enquiry quickly investigated the cause of Hood's explosion and produced a report. After criticism that the initial enquiry did not record all the available evidence, a second board of enquiry more extensively investigated Hood's loss, and examined the vulnerabilities of other large British warships still in service in light of the probable causes of the explosion. It, like the first enquiry, concluded that a 15 in (380 mm) shell from Bismarck caused the explosion of Hood's aft ammunition magazines. This led to refitting some older British warships with increased protection for their ammunition magazines and some other related improvements.

Many naval historians and writers have analyzed the Bismarck engagement and weighed the participants' decisions. One of the most debated is Lütjens' decision to proceed into the Atlantic rather than continue the battle.

== Parallels to Jutland ==
A number of parallels were drawn by historian Correlli Barnett between Holland's actions and those of Admiral David Beatty in the opening stages of the Battle of Jutland. According to Barnett, Holland felt he had to engage Bismarck immediately, rather than support Wake-Walker in shadowing until Force 'H' could arrive. Beatty, likewise, felt he needed to engage German Admiral Franz Hipper's battlecruisers with his own forces instead of drawing the Germans toward Admiral John Jellicoe and the rest of the British Grand Fleet.

Holland, like Beatty, possessed superiority in the number of heavy ships he possessed, yet he was encumbered by an inferiority in the fighting effectiveness of those units. Moreover, Holland's deployment of his units compared to Beatty's deployment at Jutland. Beatty and Holland both attacked while German units were well before the beam. As a result, the midship and aft turrets of Beatty's ships could barely fire on the enemy. Holland's ships could not use their aft turrets until the final turn to port just before Hood was sunk.

Beatty placed his lighter-armoured battlecruisers at the head of his line, leaving the more powerful and better-armoured Queen Elizabeth battleships in the rear. Likewise, Holland placed the old and vulnerable Hood ahead of the better armoured (albeit new and untested) Prince of Wales. Both admirals exercised tight tactical control over their units from their flagships. This prevented Captain Leach from manoeuvring Prince of Wales independently and possibly taking a different line of approach that might have confused the Germans.

== Order of battle ==
=== Axis ===
- German battleship Bismarck
- German heavy cruiser Prinz Eugen

=== Allied ===
- The British battleship Prince of Wales.
- The British battlecruiser HMS Hood
- The British heavy cruisers HMS Suffolk, Norfolk
- The British destroyers HMS Achates, Antelope, Anthony, Echo, Electra, Icarus

The British escorting destroyers were ordered to the battle coordinates as part of the overall forces sent to intercept the German ships; they were detached the evening before the battle.

== Bibliography ==
- Adams, Simon. World War II. London: Dorling Kindersley Publishing, 2000. ISBN 0-7894-6990-1
- Barnett, Correlli (1991). Engage the enemy more closely: the Royal Navy in the Second World War. New York: W.W. Norton. ISBN 0-393-02918-2.
- Bercuson, David J. & Herwig, Holger H. (2003). The Destruction of the Bismarck. New York: The Overlook Press. ISBN 978-1-58567-397-1.
- Bennett, Geoffrey (2003). Naval Battles of WW2. Barnsley, South Yorkshire UK: Pen and Sword Books. ISBN 978-0-85052-989-0.
- Bonomi, Antonio. "The Battle of the Denmark Strait", 2008.
- Boog, Horst; Rahn, Werner; Stumpf, Reinhard & Wegner, Bernd (2001). Germany and the Second World War: Volume 6: The Global War. Oxford: Oxford University Press. ISBN 978-0-19-822888-2.
- Boyne, Walter J. Clash of Titans: World War II at Sea. New York: Simon & Schuster, 1995. ISBN
- Chesneau, Roger (2002). Hood: Life and Death of a Battlecruiser. London: Cassell Publishing. ISBN 0-304-35980-7.
- Dewar, A.D. Admiralty report BR 1736: The Chase and Sinking of the "Bismarck". Naval Staff History (Second World War) Battle Summary No. 5, March 1950. Reproduced in facsimile in Grove, Eric (ed.), German Capital Ships and Raiders in World War II. Volume I: From "Graf Spee" to "Bismarck", 1939–1941. London: Frank Cass Publishers 2002. ISBN 0-7146-5208-3.
- Garzke, William H.; Dulin, Robert O. (1980). Allied Battleships in World War II. United States Naval Institute. ISBN 0-87021-100-5.
- Garzke, William H. & Dulin, Robert O. (1985). Battleships: Axis and Neutral Battleships in World War II. Annapolis: Naval Institute Press. ISBN 978-0-87021-101-0.
- Grützner, Jens (2010). Kapitän zur See Ernst Lindemann: Der Bismarck-Kommandant – Eine Biographie [Captain at Sea Ernst Lindemann: The Bismarck-Commander – A Biography] (in German). VDM Heinz Nickel. ISBN 978-3-86619-047-4.
- Kennedy, Ludovic (1974). Pursuit: The Chase and Sinking of the Bismarck. New York: The Viking Press. ISBN 0-670-58314-6.
- Kennedy, Ludovic (2004). Pursuit: The Chase and Sinking of the "Bismarck". London: Cassell Military Paperbacks. ISBN 0-304-35526-7.
- Müllenheim-Rechberg, Burkard (1980). Battleship Bismarck: A Survivor's Story. Annapolis, MD: Naval Institute Press. ISBN 978-0-87021-096-9.
- Raven, Alan; Roberts, John (1976). British Battleships of World War Two: The Development and Technical History of the Royal Navy's Battleship and Battlecruisers from 1911 to 1946. Annapolis, Maryland: Naval Institute Press. ISBN 0-87021-817-4.
- Roskill, Stephen. The War at Sea 1939–1945. Vol. I. (1954) ISBN (none)
- Storia Militare, La battaglia dello Stretto di Danimarca, 2005.
- Schofield, B.B. Loss of the Bismarck (Sea Battles in Close-Up). London: Ian Allan Ltd. 1972.
- Tarrant, V E. King George V Class Battleships. London: Arms and Armour Press, 1991. ISBN 1-85409-524-2.
- War Diary of Bismark, Battleship Bismarck's War Diary. Translation revision December 2025.
- War Diary of Prinz Eugen, Cruiser Prinz Eugen's War Diary. Translation revision December 2025.
- Winklareth, Robert (2012). The Battle of the Denmark Strait: A Critical Analysis of the Bismarck's Singular Triumph. Casemate Publishers. ISBN 978-1-61200-135-7.
