= HMS Suffolk (55) =

County-class cruiser

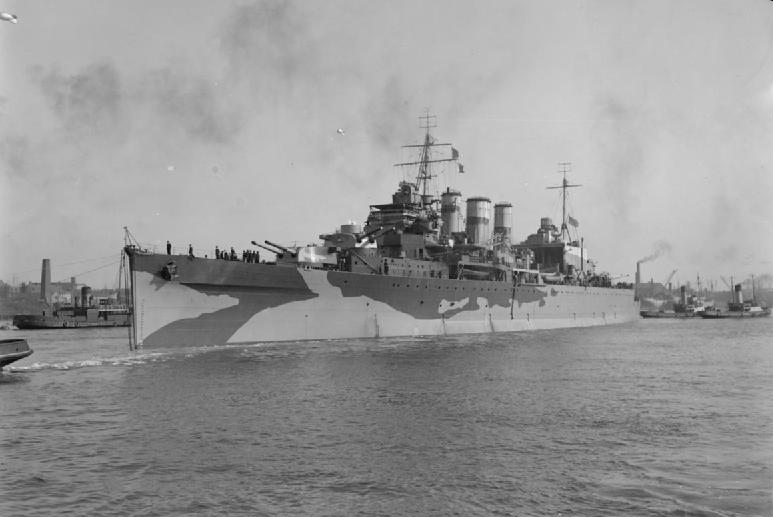
- HMS Suffolk on the Tyne

History

United Kingdom
- Name: HMS Suffolk
- Builder: Portsmouth Dockyard, UK
- Laid down: 30 September 1924
- Launched: 16 February 1926
- Commissioned: 31 May 1928
- Decommissioned: 25 March 1948
- Identification: Pennant number 55
- Motto: Nous maintiendrons: 'We shall maintain'
- Honours and awards: Norway 1940; Bismarck Action 1941; Arctic 1941–2; Burma 1945
- Fate: Scrapped, vessel was allocated to BISCO on 25 March 1948 and was scrapped at J Cashmore's, Newport, Wales, 1948.
- Badge: On a Field Green a castle Gold hanging therefrom a key Silver.

General characteristics
- Class & type: County-class heavy cruiser
- Displacement: 9,750 tons (9,924 t) standard; 13,450 tons (13,670 t) full load
- Length: 630 ft (190 m)
- Beam: 68 ft 3 in (20.80 m)
- Draught: 16 ft 3 in (4.95 m)
- Propulsion: Eight Admiralty 3-drum boilers; Four shaft Brown Curtis geared turbines; 80,000 shp (60,000 kW)
- Speed: 31.5 knots (58.3 km/h; 36.2 mph)
- Range: 3,100 nmi (5,700 km; 3,600 mi) at 31.5 kn (58.3 km/h; 36.2 mph); 13,300 nmi (24,600 km; 15,300 mi) at 12 kn (22 km/h; 14 mph); 3,400 tons (3,450 t) fuel oil
- Complement: 700
- Armament: Original configuration: 8 (4x2) 8-inch (203 mm) dual guns; 8 × QF 4-inch (102 mm) Mk V single AA guns; 8 (2x4) 2-pounder (40 mm) pom-poms quad guns; 8 (2x4) 0.5-inch (12.7 mm) quadruple machine guns; 2 × 21-inch (533 mm) quadruple torpedo tubes.; 1937 – 1941 configuration: 8 × 8-inch (203 mm) dual guns, 6 × 4-inch (102 mm) single AA guns, 2 × 2 pdr eight barrel quad guns, 2 × 0.5-inch MG quadruple guns.; 2 × 21-inch (533 mm) quad torpedo tubes.; 1941 – 1942 configuration: 8 × 8-inch (203 mm) dual guns, 6 × 4-inch (102 mm) single AA guns, 2 × 4-inch (102 mm) dual AA guns, 4 × 20 mm (0.8 in) single guns, 2 × 2 pdr eight barrel quad guns, 2 × 0.5-inch MG quadruple guns.; 2 × 21-inch (533 mm) quad torpedo tubes.; 1942 – 1944 configuration: 8 × 8 in (203 mm) dual guns, 6 × 4 in (102 mm) single AA guns, 2 × 4 in (102 mm) dual AA guns, 6 × 20 mm (0.8 in) single guns, 5 × 20 mm (0.8 in) dual power-operated guns, 2 × 2 pdr (37 mm/40 mm) eight barrel quad guns, 2 × 21 in (533 mm) quad Torpedo Tubes.
- Armour: Magazine box protection: 1–4 in (25–102 mm); Deck: 1.375 in (34.9 mm); Side-plating, turrets and bulkheads: 1 in (25 mm); Belt: 4.5 in (114 mm); 4 internal boiler room sides (added 1936–1940)
- Aircraft carried: Three aircraft with one catapult, removed in 1943.

HMS Suffolk, pennant number 55, was a County-class heavy cruiser of the Royal Navy, and part of the Kent subclass. She was built by Portsmouth Dockyard, Portsmouth, UK, with the keel being laid down on 30 September 1924. She was launched on 16 February 1926, and commissioned on 31 May 1928. During World War II, Suffolk took part in the Norwegian Campaign in 1940 and then the Battle of the Denmark Strait in 1941, before serving in the Arctic throughout the following year. After a refit that concluded in April 1943, the cruiser served in the Far East until the end of the war. In the immediate post-war period, Suffolk undertook transport duties between the Far East, Australia and the United Kingdom before being placed in reserve in mid-1946. The vessel was sold off and then scrapped in 1948.

== History ==
=== Pre-World War II ===
Suffolk, like her sisters, served on the China Station, save for reconstruction, until the outbreak of World War II. In early 1934 she became the flagship of the China Station when Admiral Sir Frederick Dreyer dispatched Kent for a refit in Liverpool. She returned home to Portsmouth in July 1935 laden with 100 cases of "priceless" Chinese artefacts for an exhibition at the Royal Academy of Arts. During the 45 day journey a total of 1022 pieces were transported, of which 780 belonged to the Beijing Palace Museum. The transfer and exhibition were overseen by Dr C W Cheng from the Chinese Embassy in London, Palace Museum curator Chuang Yen and other Chinese officials.

=== Norwegian Campaign ===
Suffolk came home in 1939 to be equipped with a Type 79Z radar system and after the outbreak of the Second World War patrolled the Denmark Strait in October 1939. In April 1940 she participated in the Norwegian Campaign. On 13 April 1940 the ship arrived at Tórshavn to commence the British occupation of the Faroe Islands. On 14 April 1940 Suffolk sank the German tanker Skagerrak north-west of Bodø, Norway. On 17 April 1940, Suffolk and four destroyers, HMS Kipling, HMS Juno, HMS Janus and HMS Hereward, were sent to bombard the airfield at Sola, Norway. The operation had little effect and the retaliation from German bombers severely damaged the aft of the ship, forcing her to return to Scapa Flow. Suffolk was out of action from April 1940 until February 1941 while she was repaired at the Clyde. The ship was part of the 4th Cruiser Squadron.

=== Battle of the Denmark Strait ===
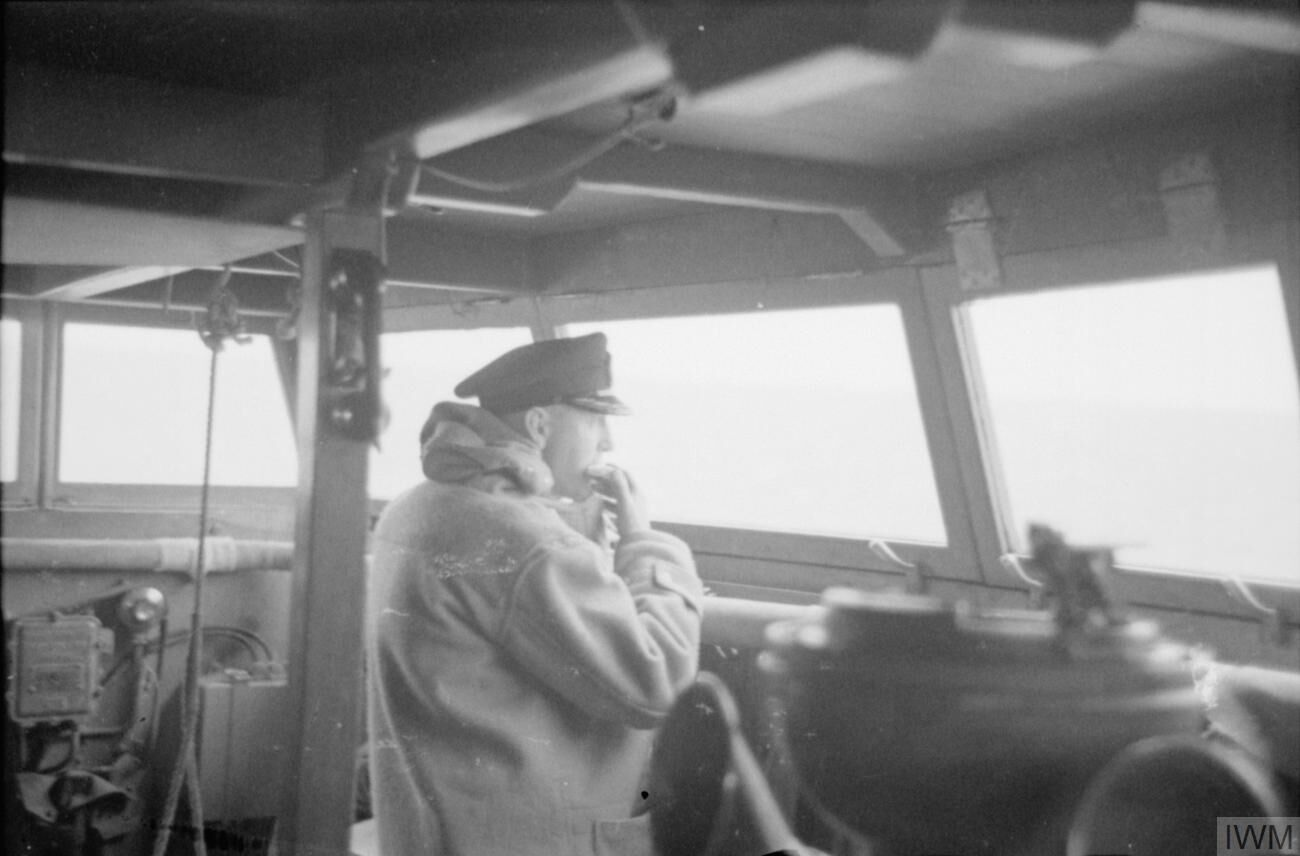
The captain of Suffolk, Robert Meyric Ellis, remains on the bridge for lunch whilst shadowing Bismarck

During May 1941 Suffolk was involved in the Battle of the Denmark Strait and the sinking of the German battleship Bismarck. Suffolk had engaged the battleship twice during the battle, firing several salvoes on her. Using her radar, Suffolk was able to track the Bismarck through the Denmark Strait and maintained contact long enough for other units to vector into Bismarck's path. During the battle the battlecruiser Hood was sunk with heavy loss of life and the battleship Prince of Wales was damaged and forced to retreat. Afterwards, Bismarck was shadowed from a distance by Suffolk, Norfolk and the damaged Prince of Wales by using the cruisers radar equipment, but Bismarck managed to elude the ships which had been shadowing her by making a 270° turn behind their wakes. As Bismarck was losing oil, her captain Ernst Lindemann decided to attempt to reach Brest, France for repairs but was sighted by an RAF Catalina, damaged by torpedo bombers sent from the aircraft carrier Ark Royal and eventually sunk after a punishing near 100-minute long bombardment from the battleships HMS King George V and HMS Rodney which were supported by the heavy cruisers Norfolk and Dorsetshire.

=== Later career ===
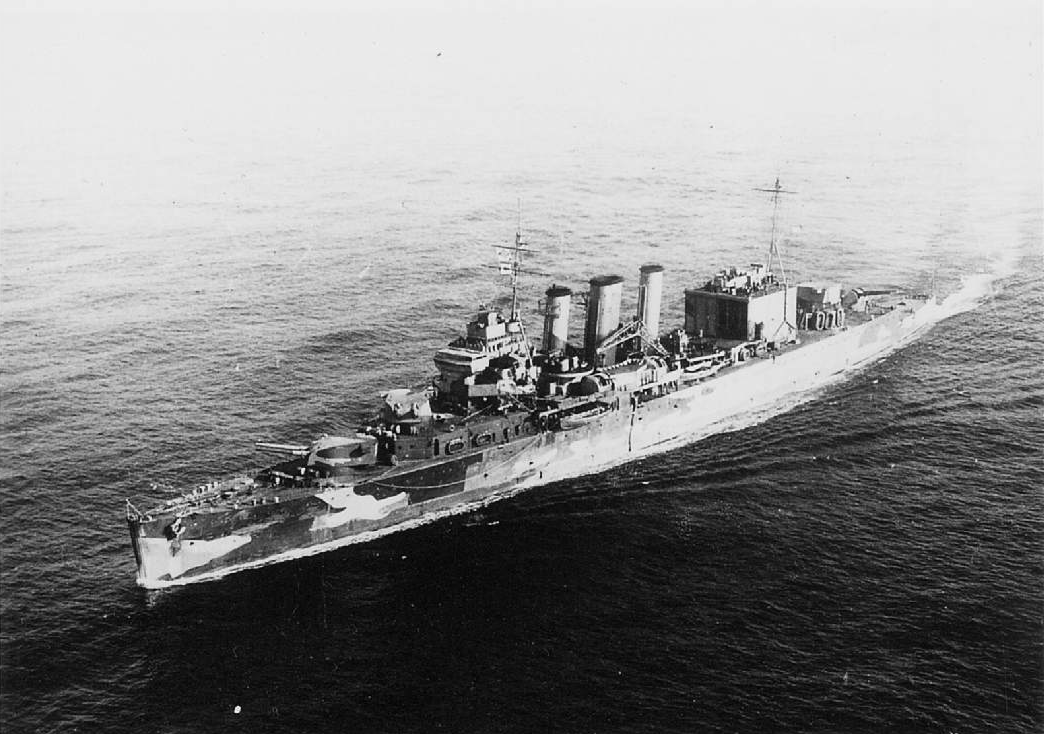
HMS Suffolk in May 1941

After her repairs Suffolk served with the Home Fleet in Arctic waters until the end of 1942, then underwent a refit between December 1942 and April 1943 when "X" turret was removed and replaced with additional AA guns. On completion of this the ship was ordered to the Eastern Fleet, operating in the Indian Ocean until the end of the war.

From 26 August 1945 Suffolk was used to transport military and civilian personnel from Australia, and the Far East, back to the UK. On her return Suffolk underwent repairs at Chatham Dockyard between November 1945 and January 1946. On completion she sailed to Australia again, returning in April 1946. Her final voyage was to Singapore arriving there in May, and returning in July 1946.

In the summer of 1946 she was placed in unmaintained reserve until 1948. With the post-war economic difficulties of Britain hitting hard in 1947–1948 the reserve fleet was quickly sold off, and Suffolk was decommissioned and allocated to BISCO on 25 March 1948. She was towed to J Cashmore's (Newport, Wales) where she arrived on 24 June 1948 and scrapping began immediately.
