= Sink the Bismarck! =

1960 British film by Lewis Gilbert

- UK quad crown theatrical release poster by Tom Chantrell
- Directed by: Lewis Gilbert
- Screenplay by: Edmund H. North
- Based on: The Last Nine Days of the Bismarck; 1958 novel by C. S. Forester
- Produced by: John Brabourne
- Starring: Kenneth More; Dana Wynter
- Cinematography: Christopher Challis
- Edited by: Peter R. Hunt
- Music by: Clifton Parker
- Distributed by: 20th Century-Fox
- Release date: 11 February 1960
- Running time: 97 minutes
- Country: United Kingdom
- Language: English
- Budget: $1,330,000
- Box office: $3,000,000 (US/Canada rentals)

Sink the Bismarck! is a 1960 black-and-white CinemaScope British war film based on the 1958 book The Last Nine Days of the Bismarck by C. S. Forester. It stars Kenneth More and Dana Wynter and was directed by Lewis Gilbert. It is the only film made that deals directly with the operations, chase and sinking of the battleship Bismarck by the Royal Navy during the Second World War. Although war films were common in the 1960s, Sink the Bismarck! was seen as something of an anomaly, with much of its time devoted to the "unsung back-room planners as much as on the combatants themselves". Its historical accuracy, in particular, met with much praise despite a number of inconsistencies.

Sink the Bismarck! was the inspiration for Johnny Horton's highly popular 1960 song, "Sink the Bismarck", credited by Variety with boosting the film's American gross alone by an estimated half a million dollars.

The film had its Royal World Premiere in the presence of the Duke of Edinburgh at the Odeon Leicester Square on 11 February 1960.

== Plot ==
In February 1939, Nazi Germany's most powerful battleship, Bismarck, is launched, beginning a new era of German sea power. In May 1941, British naval intelligence discovers Bismarck and the heavy cruiser Prinz Eugen are sailing into the North Atlantic to attack Allied convoys. From an underground war room in London, Captain Jonathan Shepard, a widower with a son in the Navy, coordinates the hunt for Bismarck with the help of Women's Royal Naval Service Second Officer (WRNS) Anne Davis, who is concerned by Shepard's icy demeanor.

The German warships engage HMS Hood and HMS Prince of Wales in the Denmark Strait. Hood is annihilated in an instant, shocking combatants on both sides. Prince of Wales fights on and damages Bismarck's bow, before return fire damages her bridge, forcing retreat behind a smoke screen. Bismarck and Prinz Eugen withdraw, shadowed by the cruisers HMS Suffolk and HMS Norfolk using radar. On hearing of the loss of Hood, Prime Minister Winston Churchill issues the order to "sink the Bismarck". Prinz Eugen breaks off for the port of Brest, in occupied France, with Bismarck driving off the British cruisers with broadsides as Prinz Eugen escapes. An air attack launched from the carrier HMS Victorious damages Bismarck's fuel tanks.

At operations headquarters in London, Captain Shepard is informed his son's plane is missing. Gambling that Admiral Günther Lütjens, the Fleet Commander aboard Bismarck, has ordered a return to friendly waters where U-boats and air cover will make it impossible to attack, he plans to intercept Bismarck before she reaches safety with a disproportionately large force. His wager pays off when Bismarck is located steaming toward the French coast. British forces have a narrow time window in which to destroy or slow their prey before German support and their own diminishing fuel supplies will preclude further attacks. Swordfish torpedo planes from HMS Ark Royal misidentify HMS Sheffield as Bismarck, but their new magnetic torpedo detonators are faulty, and most of them explode as soon as they are launched. Their second attack, after rearming with conventional contact torpedoes, is successful and a torpedo jams the German battleship's rudder. Captain Shepard is told his son has been rescued, and weeps in his office.

Unable to repair her rudder, Bismarck steams in circles and British destroyers launch a night torpedo attack on the crippled battleship. Bismarck returns fire, sinking the destroyer HMS Solent. (Note: The (fictitious) HMS Solent is destroyed.) After sunrise the main British force, including battleships HMS Rodney and HMS King George V, engage Bismarck. Lütjens insists that German forces will arrive to save them, but is killed with other senior officers when a shell strikes Bismarck's bridge. The crew abandon ship. On board King George V, Admiral John Tovey orders the newly joined cruiser HMS Dorsetshire to torpedo her, causing her to capsize and sink faster than her crew can escape. The captain of King George V, Wilfrid Patterson, lowers his head as Bismarck disappears beneath the waves, completing the Royal Navy's response to Churchill's directive. Admiral Tovey orders Dorsetshire to pick up survivors, finally saying, "Well, gentlemen, let's go home." Back in London, Captain Shepherd asks Second Officer Davis out to dinner when she says it is nine o'clock, believing it to be nighttime, only to find it is nine in the morning. The two go out to breakfast instead.

== Cast ==
=== Ashore ===
- Kenneth More as Captain Jonathan Shepard (inspired by Captain Ralph Edwards) (More had served as a Royal Navy lieutenant on HMS Victorious during the war.)
- Dana Wynter as Women's Royal Naval Service Second Officer (WRNS) Anne Davis
- Laurence Naismith as First Sea Lord Admiral of the Fleet Sir Dudley Pound (Naismith served in the Royal Artillery in the war.)
- Geoffrey Keen as Assistant Chief of the Naval Staff (A.C.N.S.) (inspired by Rear Admiral Arthur Power)
- Michael Goodliffe as Captain Banister (inspired by Captain Cecil H. J. Harcourt) (Captured at Dunkirk after being shot in the leg.)
- Maurice Denham as Commander Richards (Served in the Medical Corps in the war.)
- Norman Shelley as voice of Prime Minister Winston Churchill (uncredited)
- Jack Watling as RNVR Signals Officer
- Thomas Waldron Price as Flag Lieutenant to First Sea Lord
- Seán Barrett as Able Seaman Brown
- Victor Maddern as Leading seaman, in closing scene outside Admiralty (uncredited)
- Graham Stark as Petty Officer Williams
- Russell Napier as Air Vice-Marshal (uncredited)
- John Barron as photographic intelligence officer (uncredited)
- David Tomlinson (uncredited)

and

- Edward R. Murrow as himself: Edward R. Murrow, CBS London radio correspondent in 1941

=== At sea ===
- Karel Štěpánek as Admiral Günther Lütjens in Bismarck
- Carl Möhner as Captain Ernst Lindemann of Bismarck (voice: Robert Rietti)
- Walter Hudd as Vice-Admiral Lancelot Holland, in HMS Hood
- John Stuart as Captain Ralph Kerr of HMS Hood
- Esmond Knight as Captain John Leach of HMS Prince of Wales (Knight served as a gunnery officer on board Prince of Wales, and was seriously injured and blinded during the battle with Bismarck.)
- Johnny Briggs as Young Seaman in Prince of Wales (uncredited)
- Sydney Tafler as Henry, civilian workman aboard Prince of Wales
- Sam Kydd as civilian workman aboard Prince of Wales
- Julian Somers as civilian workman aboard HMS Prince of Wales
- Ernest Clark as Captain Robert Ellis, HMS Suffolk (Clark served in the army during the war receiving the Military Cross)
- Mark Dignam as Captain Loben Maund, HMS Ark Royal
- John Stride as Tom Shepard, Captain Shepard's son, TAG (Telegraphist/Air Gunner) in Ark Royal's Swordfish squadron (uncredited)
- Donald Churchill as Seaman on Ark Royal (uncredited)
- Glyn Houston as Seaman on Prince of Wales (uncredited)
- David Hemmings as seaman in Ark Royal (uncredited)
- John Horsley as Captain Charles Larcom, HMS Sheffield
- Peter Burton as Captain Philip Vian, 4th Destroyer Flotilla (First Destroyer)
- Jack Gwillim as Captain Wilfrid Patterson, HMS King George V (Gwillim served 20 years in the Royal Navy, rising to the rank of commander.)
- Michael Hordern as Admiral Sir John Tovey, C-in-C Home Fleet, in HMS King George V (Hordern served as a lieutenant commander on HMS Illustrious during the war.)
- Peter Dyneley as Commander Jenkins (uncredited)
- Michael Balfour as Able Seaman – Lookout on Suffolk (uncredited)
- Michael Ripper as Able Seaman – Lookout on Suffolk (uncredited)
- Walter Gotell as Signals Officer Mueller on the Bismarck (uncredited)
- George Pravda as Damage Control Officer on the Bismarck (uncredited)
- Anthony Oliver as Operations Officer on Ark Royal (uncredited)
- Ian Hendry as Meteorological Officer on King George V (uncredited)
- Brian Worth as Torpedo Control Officer on First Destroyer (uncredited)
- Edward Judd as Navigating Officer on board Prince of Wales (uncredited)
- Hugh Moxey as Captain – HMS Solent (Second Destroyer) (uncredited)

== Production ==
=== Scripting ===
C. S. Forester reportedly wrote the story as a screen treatment for 20th Century-Fox before even writing the book.

Writer Edmund H. North worked closely with Forester's story, compressing events and time lines to make the plot taut. Along with the director, he decided to use a documentary-style technique, switching back-and-forth from a fairly insular war room to action taking place on remote battleships. The action is made more realistic when the human element of men in a game of wits and nerves is involved. The use of Edward R. Murrow reprising his wartime broadcasts from London also lends an air of authenticity and near-documentary feel. Lewis Gilbert said it was a "very well written script" one of the few in his career that he barely altered. "It was more like a detective story," said Gilbert.

Gilbert was offered the film by John Brabourne. They decided to shoot the film in black and white in order to intercut it with newsreel footage and to make it seem more authentic.

The film end-credits identify the actual Director of Operations as Capt. R. A. B. Edwards and "Capt. Shepard" as fictional. Added human interest is given to Shephard with his son's possible loss of life in battle affecting Shephard's emotions. There is an absence of a Shepard-Davis interplay to add gender interrelationships in wartime to the narrative. It is found but only at the very end and when, with the Bismarck dispatched to the seafloor, Shepard asks the young Wren officer for a dinner date and they walk out into London's sunny morning air. In a similar manner, the battle between British and German forces is also recreated as a human drama, with Admiral Lütjens pitted against Captain Shepard in a "psychological chess match".

=== Casting ===
Lewis Gilbert suggested Kenneth More for the lead, with whom he had worked several times before. Dana Wynter was under contract to 20th Century-Fox.

== Reception ==
=== Critical ===
For the most part, the historical accuracy in Sink the Bismarck! was praised by critics, with Variety calling it a "first-rate film re-creation of a thrilling historical event". A contemporary The New York Times review by A. H. Weiler, likewise championed its realism in saying "a viewer could not ask for greater authenticity". However, it went on to criticise both the acting and the constant scene changes "from Admiralty plotting rooms to the bridges of the ships at sea", claiming that this lessened the "over-all effectiveness" of both scenes. Film4 praised its cinematography, noting that it "very realistically re-enacted scenes in the War Room of the Admiralty" as well as "excellently filmed episodes using miniature models".

During the postwar period, war films were one staple of the British film industry, with Sink the Bismarck! an exemplar, sharing the "common themes, actors ... visual style and ideological messages" of the genre. British magazine Radio Times viewed Sink the Bismarck! positively, stating that "this fine film fully captures the tensions, dangers and complexities of battle by concentrating on the unsung back-room planners as much as on the combatants themselves" while also praising More's performance. Attention was drawn to the ways in which it deviated from other war films of the period, specifically commenting on how "there is a respect for the enemy that is missing in many previous flag-wavers". The film was given a four-star rating.

Gilbert's continual forays into events that shaped the British war experience mirrored his own background as a wartime filmmaker. His films merged historical episodes and the role of the individual, with Sink the Bismarck! characterised as having an "emotional punch, not least because Gilbert's direction relentlessly focuses on the human dimension amidst the history".

=== Box office ===
Sink the Bismarck! was well received by the public and, according to Kine Weekly, it was the second most popular film released in Great Britain in 1960 (after Doctor in Love). The film replicated the success of other British war-themed productions in the decade that also received healthy box office, including The Cruel Sea (1953), The Dam Busters (1955) and Reach for the Sky (1956). Unlike most British war films Sink the Bismarck! was a surprise hit in North America. Gilbert was surprised by the film's popularity in the US as Reach for the Sky had flopped in that country, and that had a strong personal story which Sink the Bismarck! did not. And the battle did not involve the US at all. (This led to Gilbert turning down the offer of a significant percentage of the profits in Sink the Bismarck! which he later regretted. In 1996 he said he was still receiving some money from it.) The film was More's most successful picture in the US.

The Johnny Horton song "Sink the Bismarck", which reached No. 3 on both the US pop and country charts, was not an original movie tie-in and did not appear in the film, but was instrumental in introducing the film to an American audience. In addition to its airplay and chart success, Horton's song was used in the American promotional trailer. Variety estimated half a million of the gross could be attributed to the success of the song.

== Historical accuracy ==
Sink the Bismarck! was made before 1975, when the British code-breaking at Bletchley Park was declassified, so it did not reveal that Shepard's hunches about the movements of the Bismarck were supported by intelligence. Direction finding and traffic analysis showed that on 25 May, Bismarck stopped talking to Wilhelmshaven and resumed with Paris, and Shepard committed to the belief that Bismarck was headed for the French coast. The radio switch from Wilhelmshaven to Paris might have been caused by Bismarck crossing the line between southern Greenland and the northern Hebrides, which placed her under Group West instead of Group North. Nonetheless, Shepard's hunch was proved correct when, by good luck, a Luftwaffe Enigma transmission was intercepted and decoded at Bletchley Park, revealing that Bismarck was headed for Brest to repair an oil leak. The Luftwaffe's Enigma code had been broken early in the war, unlike the German naval Enigma code, which was only broken later and was subject only to traffic analysis during the Bismarck pursuit. Damage during her battle with HMS Hood and HMS Prince of Wales caused flooding that put Bismarck's bow barely above sea level. Oil slicks caused by hits from HMS Prince of Wales were apparent. In the film, Bismarck's bow remains at its normal height above sea level.

A comparison of the real Bismarck (bottom) in 1940 and that from the film (top) during the scene in which she engages HMS Prince of Wales.

Some minor errors involve the visual appearance of Bismarck. When a spy in Kristiansand, Norway, sees Bismarck arrive in Norwegian waters (sailing from the east), the ship is shown sailing from right to left (from the west). Bismarck has no apparent camouflage but in fact, the ship still had striped "Baltic camouflage" along her sides, which was removed shortly before she headed out to sea. Also, the photo-reconnaissance Spitfire that photographs Bismarck and Prinz Eugen in a fjord is shown as two different versions, each with different canopies.

Sink the Bismarck! simplifies the movements of HMS Hood and HMS Prince of Wales in the battle. The film shows an early order to turn to allow the British ships to fire full broadsides. In reality, they sought to close the distance first, presenting smaller targets to the German ships but using only their forward gun turrets which reduced their firepower advantage by eight big guns, while Bismarck and Prinz Eugen were firing full broadsides of all their main guns. The film does not show that HMS Hood mistook heavy cruiser Prinz Eugen for Bismarck, at first firing at the wrong ship before correcting her fire. Only in her final moments did HMS Hood begin a turn to fire a broadside on Bismarck. HMS Hood was hit during this turn and she exploded. The turn presented Hood's deck armour at an angle more vulnerable to shell penetration and has been cited as a possible cause for the explosion and her subsequent destruction, an issue the film does not cover. HMS Hood is shown firing to port while the Bismarck is shown firing to starboard; in fact it was the other way around.

In one scene, Lütjens speculates that after Bismarck has undergone repair in Brest, the two German battleships based there, Gneisenau and Scharnhorst, could join Bismarck in raiding Allied shipping. There is no record of such a discussion at that time, although it would have been possible for Bismarck to sortie with the two battleships if Bismarck had reached the port. (Note: This concept was not an original idea of Lütjens; it had been proposed by German naval staff before the battle, but was scrapped because of the repairs the two German battleships needed from damage during an air raid.)

Another historical deviation was made in depicting the night engagement between British destroyers and Bismarck. The film portrayal shows three British hits by torpedoes, while the British destroyer HMS Solent is hit and destroyed by Bismarck. There was no destroyer named Solent and no successful torpedo attack, although S-class submarine HMS Solent did exist during the war as a submarine operating in the Eastern Fleet in 1944. On 26 May, a Royal Navy destroyer squadron, led by Captain (later Admiral) Philip Vian in HMS Cossack, did exchange gunfire during unsuccessful torpedo attacks, with Bismarck inflicting minor damage to the destroyers. (Note: The other destroyers involved in the attack were HMS Maori, HMS Sikh, HMS Zulu and ORP Piorun. Aboard HMS Zulu, a sub-lieutenant in the gunnery control tower lost a hand to shell splinters when a shell landed on the forecastle but did not explode. HMS Cossack had her radio antenna sheared off by a shell. The Royal Navy did lose a destroyer later in the operations – HMS Mashona was sunk by the Luftwaffe on 28 May.) The action of the attached Polish destroyer Piorun (ex N-class HMS Nerissa) was not depicted, although she sailed straight for Bismarck, signalling "I am a Pole" as she went, but none of her shots found their mark.

The aircraft that finally located Bismarck after she escaped detection by HMS Suffolk and HMS Norfolk is correctly shown as a Catalina, but the fact that it was piloted by an American Naval Reserve officer, Ensign Leonard Smith, could not be revealed until long after the war, since the United States was neutral at the time of the engagement. The attacks by Fleet Air Arm Swordfish show some aircraft being shot down; no Swordfish was lost to Bismarck's guns and all were recovered. However, from HMS Victorious's air raid, two Fairey Fulmar escort fighters ran out of fuel and ditched. Three fliers were picked up from a rubber boat.

Perhaps the most significant historical error is that the film places the British naval intelligence operation in the Admiralty, Whitehall, London. The actual centre of intelligence operations during the Battle of the Atlantic and the pursuit of Bismarck was at Derby House, Liverpool.

=== Portrayal of Günther Lütjens ===
The film has been criticised for its portrayal of German Admiral Günther Lütjens, who is portrayed as a stereotypical committed Nazi, crazed in his undaunted belief that Bismarck is unsinkable. In reality, Lütjens did not agree with Nazi policies; along with two other navy commanders, he had publicly protested against the brutality of antisemitic crimes during Kristallnacht. He is portrayed as saying "Never forget that you are Nazis", but the term "Nazi" was a short form pejorative term used by Germans to refer to the full name "Nationalsozialisten" ("National Socialists") that has become the common name used in English to refer to the ideology and its followers. He was one of the few officers who refused to give the Nazi salute when Hitler visited Bismarck before its first and final mission, deliberately using instead the traditional naval salute. He was pessimistic of the chances of success of Bismarck's mission and realised that it would be a daunting task.

The film shows Lütjens ordering Captain Ernst Lindemann to open fire on HMS Hood and HMS Prince of Wales. In reality, Lütjens ordered Lindemann to avoid engaging HMS Hood; Lindemann refused and ordered the ship's guns to open fire.

=== Ships involved ===
Sink the Bismarck! was made in 1960, as the last major Second World War fleet units were being retired. Producer John Brabourne was able to use his influence as son-in-law of Lord Mountbatten, then Chief of the Defence Staff, to obtain the full co-operation of the Admiralty. The soon-to-be-scrapped battleship HMS Vanguard provided some footage of a capital ship's 15-inch gun turrets in action, and was used for scenes set on board HMS Hood, Prince of Wales, King George V, and Bismarck herself. The cruiser HMS Belfast, now preserved in London, was used to depict the cruisers involved in Bismarck's pursuit, including HMS Norfolk, Suffolk, Sheffield and Dorsetshire. A Dido-class cruiser in reserve was used as the set for Bismarck's destruction, and one of her tall raked funnels is glimpsed in the final scenes.

The aircraft carrier HMS Victorious is briefly shown as herself, despite the postwar addition of a large angled flight deck and a massive Type 984 "searchlight" radar; the same ship is also used to depict HMS Ark Royal sailing from Gibraltar. All flying from both carriers was filmed aboard HMS Centaur – clearly marked with her postwar pennant number R06 – and three surviving Fairey Swordfish aircraft were restored, of which two were flown from her flight deck. These three aircraft now form the core of the Royal Navy Historic Flight. A 2010 article in Aeroplane identifies the Swordfish flown in the production: LS326, carrying its true serial, was marked as "5A" of 825 Naval Air Squadron, while NF389 was marked as LS423 / "5B". The same actor plays the leader of the Swordfish attack from HMS Victorious (in reality, Lt Cdr Eugene Esmonde VC, DSO), and also the pilot from HMS Ark Royal who later fired the torpedo which crippled Bismarck's steering gear (in reality Lt John Moffat RNR).

The destroyers used to depict the torpedo night attacks were the C-class HMS Cavalier, representing the flagship of "Captain (D), of the 4th Destroyer Flotilla" (in reality, Captain Vian in HMS Cossack) and the Battle-class destroyer HMS Hogue, representing the fictitious HMS Solent which Bismarck destroys in the film. Their pennant numbers can be made out quite clearly, although they are reversed because of the film's convention that British ships should move from left to right on the screen and German ships vice versa. These were the last classes of destroyer built during the war, and the last to have the classic War Emergency Programme destroyers' outline. HMS Cavalier remained in service until 1972, the last RN destroyer to have served in the Second World War, and is now preserved at Chatham Dockyard to commemorate all these vessels, but the newer and larger HMS Hogue was broken up shortly after the film was completed, following a collision off Ceylon with the Indian cruiser INS Mysore (formerly HMS Nigeria).

The large models of the major warships Bismarck, HMS Hood, HMS Prince of Wales, HMS King George V, HMS Rodney and the County-class cruisers, are generally accurate, although HMS Hood is depicted in a slightly earlier configuration than that which actually blew up. The use of models in a studio tank was intercut with wartime footage and staged sequences using available full-size warships. Bismarck's anti-aircraft guns, however, are represented by stock footage of British QF 2-pounder naval guns.

== Other productions ==
A revival of interest in the Bismarck was reflected in numerous publications that followed the film, as well as a variety of scale models that were produced. (Note: As a closer tie-in to the film, the original Forester book was re-released as Sink the Bismarck.) When the 1989 expedition by Dr. Robert Ballard to locate and photograph the remains of the battleship proved to be successful, further attention was directed to the story of the Bismarck. A number of documentaries have also been produced including the Channel 4 miniseries Battle of Hood and Bismarck (2002) and Hunt for the Bismarck aired in 2007 on the History Channel network worldwide.

== See also ==
- Battle of the Denmark Strait
- Operation Rheinübung – history of the sortie of Bismarck and Prinz Eugen
- Last battle of the battleship Bismarck
- Greyhound, 2020 film also adapted from a book by Forester
