= List of ships named Solent =

Several ships have borne the name Solent, after the stretch of water between the Isle of Wight and mainland England, including:

- HMS Solent, two vessels of the British Royal Navy:
  - HMS Solent (1907), a War Department submarine mining vessel Solent, built in 1885, transferred to the Navy as a storeship in 1907, and sold later that year
  - HMS Solent (P262), an S-class submarine, launched in 1944 and broken up in 1961
- Three passenger paddle steamers of the London and South Western Railway, providing ferry services to the Isle of Wight:
  - PS Solent (1863)
  - PS Solent (1900)
  - PS Solent (1902)
- Two passenger-cargo liners of the Royal Mail Steam Packet Company used on inter-island West Indies services:
  - Solent (1852), a 2230 grt paddle steamer, built by T & J White at Cowes and broken up in 1869
  - Solent (1878), a 1908 grt screw steamer, built by Oswald Mordaunt and Co at Woolston and broken up in 1909
