= Soylent =

Soylent or Soilent may refer to:

== Businesses and brands ==
- Soylent (meal replacement), a brand of meal replacement products available in the United States
- Soylent Communications, owner of the NNDB biographical database

== Fiction ==
- Soylent, a type of food eaten in the 1966 Harry Harrison science fiction novel Make Room! Make Room!
  - Soylent Green, a 1973 American dystopian thriller film directed by Richard Fleischer (partly based on the novel)

== Music ==
- "Soylent Green", on Wumpscut's 1993 album Music for a Slaughtering Tribe
- Soilent Green, an American metal band (formed 1988)
- Soilent Grün, a German punk band (disbanded 1982)

== See also ==
- The Solent, a strait off Great Britain
- Solent (disambiguation)
