= Pridham =

Pridham is a surname. Notable people with the surname include:

- Andrew Pridham (born 1966), Australian investment banker
- Arthur Pridham (1886–1975), British naval officer
- Cherie Pridham (born 1971), British sporting director and cyclist
- Chris Pridham (born 1965), Canadian tennis player
- Colby Pridham (born 1987), Canadian ice hockey player
- Delaney Baie Pridham (born 1997), American soccer player
- Henry Pridham-Wippell (1885–1952), British naval officer
- Les Pridham (1937–2021), Australian rules footballer
- Mackenzie Pridham (born 1990), Canadian soccer player
- William Pridham (1841–1919), English-born Canadian drover and politician
