= Solent (disambiguation) =

The Solent is a stretch of sea separating the Isle of Wight from Great Britain.

Solent may also refer to:

- HMS Solent, two ships of the British Royal Navy
- PS Solent, three passenger vessels of the London and South Western Railway
- River Solent, an extinct river in the area of the coastlines of Hampshire and the Isle of Wight
- The Short Solent, often simply called a Solent, a type of flying boat
- Solent City, an alternate name for South Hampshire
- Solent Group, a geological group in the Hampshire Basin of southern England
- Solent University, a university in Southampton, England
- Solent (sailing rig)
