= HMS Sleuth =

Submarine of the Royal Navy

Coordinates: 4°50′S 115°40′E

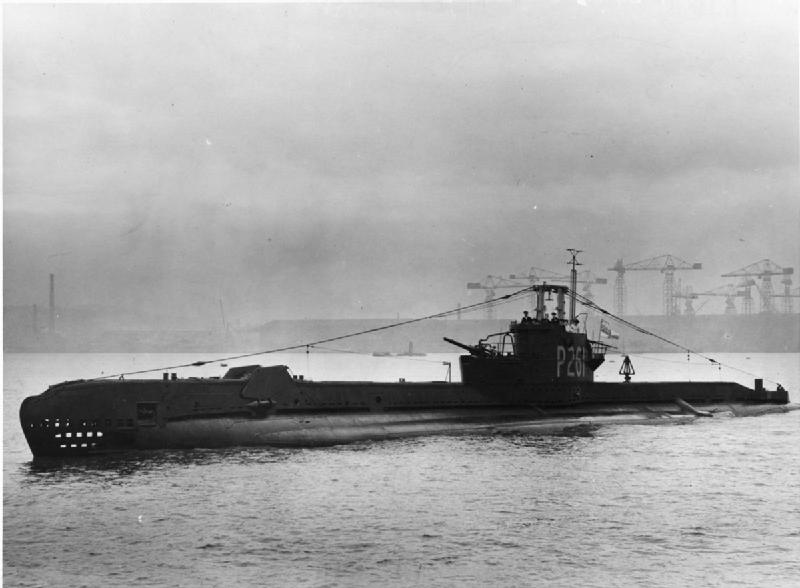
- HMS Sleuth

History

United Kingdom
- Name: HMS Sleuth
- Builder: Cammell Laird & Co Limited, Birkenhead
- Laid down: 30 June 1943
- Launched: 6 July 1944
- Commissioned: 8 October 1944
- Fate: broken up 1958
- Badge

General characteristics
- Class & type: S-class submarine
- Displacement: 814 long tons (827 t) surfaced; 990 long tons (1,010 t) submerged
- Length: 217 ft (66.1 m)
- Beam: 23 ft 9 in (7.2 m)
- Draught: 14 ft 1 in (4.3 m)
- Installed power: 1,900 bhp (1,400 kW) (diesel); 1,300 hp (970 kW) (electric)
- Propulsion: 2 × diesel engines; 2 × electric motors
- Speed: 14.75 knots (27.32 km/h; 16.97 mph) surfaced; 9 knots (17 km/h; 10 mph) submerged
- Range: 7,500 nmi (13,900 km; 8,600 mi) at 10 knots (19 km/h; 12 mph) surface; 120 nmi (220 km; 140 mi) at 3 knots (5.6 km/h; 3.5 mph) submerged
- Test depth: 350 feet (106.7 m)
- Complement: 48
- Armament: 6 × bow 21 in (533 mm) torpedo tubes; 1 × 4-inch (102 mm) deck gun

HMS Sleuth was a S-class submarine of the third batch built for the Royal Navy during World War II. She survived the war and was sold for scrap in 1958.

== Design and description ==
The last 17 boats of the third batch were significantly modified from the earlier boats. They had a stronger hull, carried more fuel and their armament was revised. The submarines had a length of 217 feet (66.1 m) overall, a beam of 23 feet 9 inches (7.2 m) and a draught of 14 feet 1 inch (4.3 m). They displaced 814 long tons (827 t) on the surface and 990 long tons (1,010 t) submerged. The S-class submarines had a crew of 48 officers and ratings. They had a diving depth of 350 feet (106.7 m).

For surface running, the boats were powered by two 950-brake-horsepower (708 kW) diesel engines, each driving one propeller shaft. When submerged each propeller was driven by a 650-horsepower (485 kW) electric motor. They could reach 14.75 knots (27.32 km/h; 16.97 mph) on the surface and 9 knots (17 km/h; 10 mph) underwater. On the surface, the third batch boats had a range of 7,500 nautical miles (13,900 km; 8,600 mi) at 10 knots (19 km/h; 12 mph) and 120 nmi (220 km; 140 mi) at 3 knots (5.6 km/h; 3.5 mph) submerged.

Sleuth was armed with six 21 inch (533 mm) torpedo tubes in the bow. She carried six reload torpedoes for a grand total of a dozen torpedoes. Twelve mines could be carried in lieu of the torpedoes. The boat was also equipped with a 4-inch (102 mm) deck gun.

== Construction and career ==
HMS Sleuth was built by Cammell Laird and launched on 6 July 1944. So far she has been the only ship of the Royal Navy to bear the name Sleuth. The boat operated in the Pacific Far East for most of her wartime career, often in company with her sister, HMS Solent. Together they sank fifteen Japanese sailing vessels and the Japanese auxiliary minesweeper Wa 3. Sleuth survived the Second World War and continued in service. On 13 June 1952 she collided with the destroyer HMS Zephyr, while leaving Portland harbour. She put her stern through the side of Zephyr as she reversed out of her berth. Sleuth was eventually sold. She arrived at Charlestown on 15 September 1958 for breaking up.
