= PS Solent (1902) =

History
- Name: PS Solent
- Operator: 1902–1923: London and South Western Railway; 1923–1948: Southern Railway; 1948: British Railways; 1948–????: H.G. Pounds, Portsmouth
- Port of registry: (United Kingdom)
- Builder: Mordey, Carney (Southampton) Ltd.
- Launched: 8 February 1902
- Maiden voyage: 26 May 1902
- Fate: Sold 1948

General characteristics
- Tonnage: 161 gross register tons (GRT)
- Length: 133.5 feet (40.7 m)
- Beam: 20.2 feet (6.2 m)
- Draught: 7.7 feet (2.3 m)

PS Solent was a passenger vessel built for the London and South Western Railway in 1902.

== History ==
As the previous vessel also named Solent built in 1900 was not a success, this Solent was built as a replacement by Mordey, Carney (Southampton) Limited and launched on 8 February 1902. She undertook her trial run on 13 March 1902 and achieved 11 knots. She undertook her maiden voyage on 26 May 1902.

She was equipped with a promenade deck 101 ft long, forming an enclosed passenger shelter forwards, and first-class saloon, about 30 ft long aft. She was deployed on the service from Lymington to Yarmouth, Isle of Wight.

She was acquired by the Southern Railway in 1923 and British Railways in 1948. She was disposed of by British Railways in 1948 to H.G. Pounds of Portsmouth
