= HMS Hood =

Admiral-class battlecruiser/fast battleship

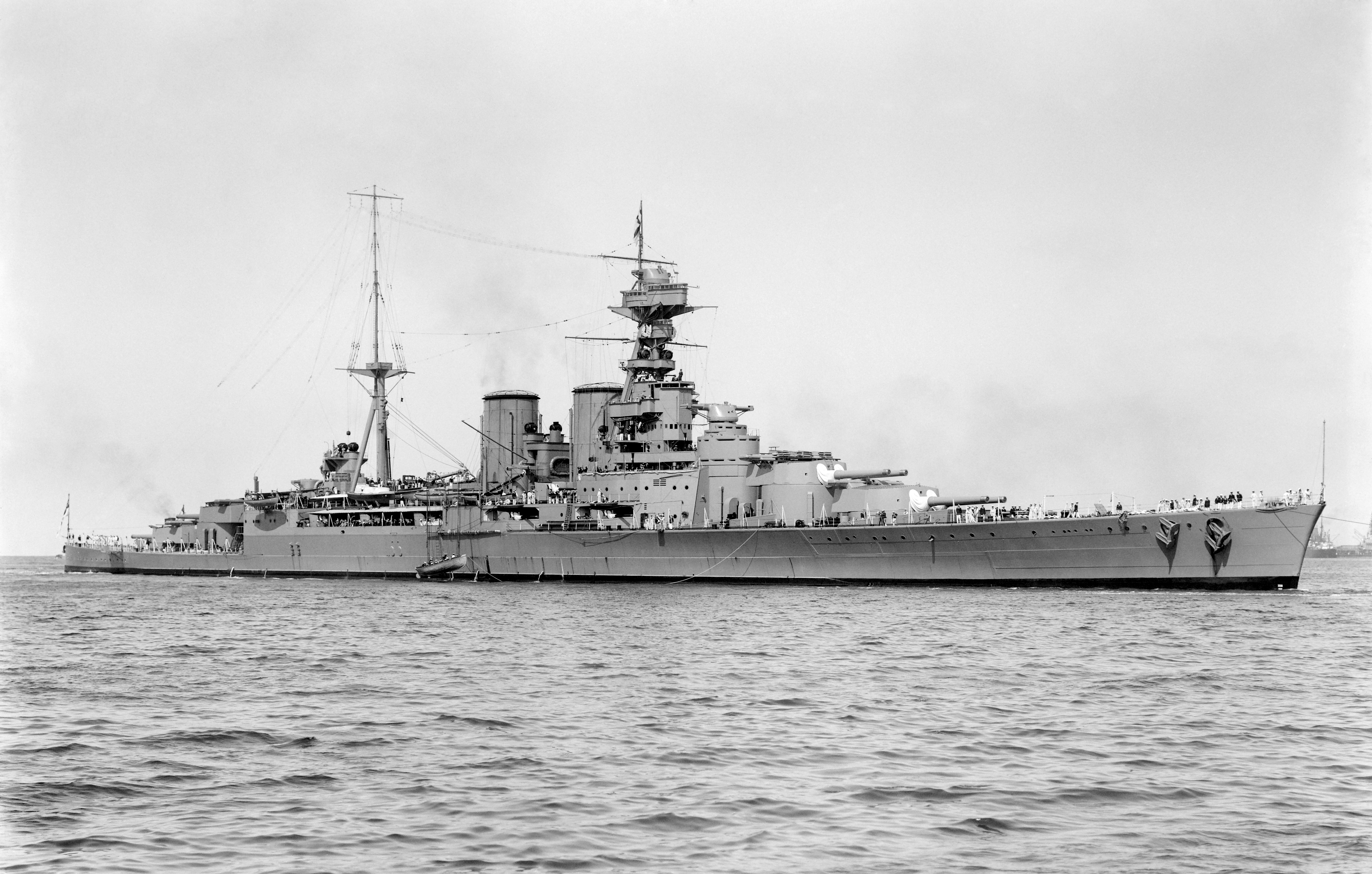
- Hood, 17 March 1924

History

United Kingdom
- Name: Hood
- Namesake: Admiral Samuel Hood
- Ordered: 7 April 1916
- Builder: John Brown & Company
- Laid down: 1 September 1916
- Launched: 22 August 1918
- Commissioned: 15 May 1920
- In service: 1920–1941
- Identification: Pennant number: 51
- Motto: Ventis Secundis (Latin: "With Favourable Winds")
- Nickname(s): "The Mighty Hood"
- Fate: Sunk during the Battle of the Denmark Strait, 24 May 1941
- Badge: A Cornish chough bearing an anchor facing left over the date 1859

General characteristics
- Class & type: Admiral-class battlecruiser
- Displacement: 46,680 long tons (47,430 t) (deep load)
- Length: 860 ft 7 in (262.3 m)
- Beam: 104 ft 2 in (31.8 m)
- Draught: 32 ft (9.8 m)
- Installed power: 24 Yarrow boilers; 144,000 shp (107,000 kW)
- Propulsion: 4 shafts; 4 geared steam turbines
- Speed: 1920: 32 knots (59 km/h; 37 mph); 1941: 30 knots (56 km/h; 35 mph)
- Range: 5,332 nautical miles (9,875 km; 6,136 mi) at 20 knots (37 km/h; 23 mph) (1931)
- Complement: 1,433 (1919)
- Armament: As built: 4 × twin 15 in (381 mm) guns; 12 × single 5.5 in (140 mm) guns; 4 × single 4 in (102 mm) AA guns; 6 × 21 in (533 mm) torpedo tubes; 1941, as sunk: 4 × twin 15 in guns; 7 × twin 4 in AA guns; 3 × octuple 2 pdr (40 mm) AA guns; 4 × quadruple 0.5 in (12.7 mm) MGs; 5 × 20-barrel "Unrotated Projectile" mounts; 4 × 21 in torpedo tubes
- Armour: Belt: 6–12 in (152–305 mm); Decks: 0.75–3 in (19–76 mm); Barbettes: 5–12 in (127–305 mm); Turrets: 11–15 in (279–381 mm); Conning tower: 9–11 in (229–279 mm)

HMS Hood (pennant number 51) was a battlecruiser (sometimes considered a fast battleship) of the Royal Navy (RN). Hood was the first of the planned four Admiral-class battlecruisers to be built during the First World War. She was already under construction when the Battle of Jutland occurred in mid-1916, and that battle revealed serious flaws in her design; with drastic revisions, she was completed four years later. For this reason, she was the only ship of her class to be completed, as the Admiralty decided it would be better to start with a clean design on succeeding battlecruisers, leading to the never-built G-3 class. Despite the appearance of newer and more modern ships, Hood remained the largest warship in the world for 20 years after her commissioning, and her prestige was reflected in her nickname, "The Mighty Hood".

Hood was involved in many showing the flag exercises between her commissioning in 1920 and the outbreak of war in 1939, including training exercises in the Mediterranean Sea and a circumnavigation of the globe with the Special Service Squadron in 1923 and 1924. She was attached to the Mediterranean Fleet following the outbreak of the Second Italo-Ethiopian War in 1935. When the Spanish Civil War broke out the following year, Hood was officially assigned to the Mediterranean Fleet until she had to return to Britain in 1939 for an overhaul. By this time, advances in naval gunnery had reduced Hood's usefulness. She was scheduled to undergo a major rebuild in 1941 to correct these issues, but the outbreak of the Second World War in September 1939 kept the ship in service without the upgrades.

When war with Germany was declared, Hood was operating in the area around Iceland, and she spent the next several months hunting for German commerce raiders and blockade runners between Iceland and the Norwegian Sea. After a brief overhaul of her propulsion system, she sailed as the flagship of Force H, and participated in the destruction of the French fleet at Mers-el-Kebir. Transferred to the Home Fleet shortly afterwards, Hood was dispatched to Scapa Flow, and operated in the area as a convoy escort and later as a defence against a potential German invasion fleet. In May 1941, Hood and the battleship Prince of Wales were ordered to intercept the German battleship Bismarck and the heavy cruiser Prinz Eugen, which were en route to the Atlantic, where they were to attack convoys. On 24 May 1941, early in the Battle of the Denmark Strait, Hood was struck by several German shells, exploded, and sank with the loss of all but 3 of her crew of 1,418.

The RN conducted two inquiries into the reasons for the ship's quick demise. The first, held soon after the ship's loss, concluded that Hood's aft magazine had exploded after one of Bismarck's shells penetrated the ship's armour. A second inquiry was held after complaints that the first board had failed to consider alternative explanations, such as an explosion of the ship's torpedoes. It was more thorough than the first board but concurred with the first board's conclusion. Despite the official explanation, some historians continued to believe that the torpedoes caused the ship's loss, while others proposed an accidental explosion inside one of the ship's gun turrets that reached down into the magazine. Other historians have concentrated on the cause of the magazine explosion. The discovery of the ship's wreck in 2001 confirmed the conclusion of both boards, although the exact reason the magazines detonated is likely to remain unknown, since that portion of the ship was obliterated in the explosion.

== Design and description ==
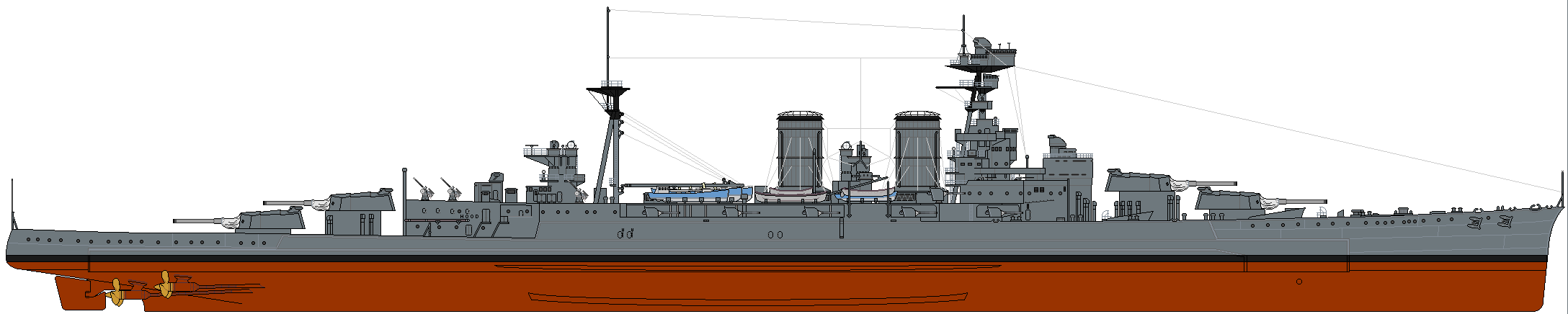
Profile drawing of Hood as she was in 1921, in Atlantic Fleet dark grey

The Admiral-class battlecruisers were designed in response to the German Mackensen-class battlecruisers, which were reported to be more heavily armed and armoured than the latest British battlecruisers of the Renown and the Courageous classes. The design was revised after the Battle of Jutland to incorporate heavier armour and all four ships were laid down. Only Hood was completed, because the ships were very expensive and required labour and material that could be put to better use building merchant ships needed to replace those lost to the German U-boat campaign.

The Admirals were significantly larger than their predecessors of the Renown class. As completed, Hood had an overall length of 860 feet 7 inches (262.3 m), a maximum beam of 104 feet 2 inches (31.8 m), and a draught of 32 feet (9.8 m) at deep load. This was 66 feet (20.1 m) longer and 14 feet (4.3 m) wider than the older ships. She displaced 42,670 long tons (43,350 t) at load and 46,680 long tons (47,430 t) at deep load, over 13,000 long tons (13,210 t) more than the older ships. The ship had a metacentric height of 4.2 feet (1.3 m) at deep load, which minimised her roll and made her a steady gun platform.

The additional armour added during construction increased her draught by about 4 feet (1.2 m) at deep load, which reduced her freeboard and made her very wet. At full speed, or in heavy seas, water would flow over the ship's quarterdeck and often entered the messdecks and living quarters through ventilation shafts. This characteristic earned her the nickname of "the largest submarine in the Navy". The persistent dampness, coupled with the ship's poor ventilation, was blamed for the high incidence of tuberculosis aboard. The ship's complement varied widely over her career; in 1919, she was authorised 1,433 men as a squadron flagship; in 1934, she had 81 officers and 1,244 ratings aboard.

The Admirals were powered by four Brown-Curtis geared steam turbines, each driving one propeller shaft using steam provided by 24 Yarrow boilers. The battlecruiser's turbines were designed to produce 144,000 shaft horsepower (107,000 kW), which would propel the ship at 31 knots (57 km/h; 36 mph), but during sea trials in 1920, Hood's turbines provided 151,280 shp (112,810 kW), which allowed her to reach 32.07 knots (59.39 km/h; 36.91 mph). She carried enough fuel oil to give her an estimated range of 7,500 nautical miles (13,900 km; 8,600 mi) at 14 knots (26 km/h; 16 mph).

=== Armament ===
The main battery of the Admiral-class ships consisted of eight BL 15-inch (381 mm) Mk I guns in hydraulically powered twin gun turrets. The turrets were designated 'A', 'B', 'X', and 'Y' from bow to stern, and 120 shells were carried for each gun. The ship's secondary armament consisted of twelve BL 5.5-inch (140 mm) Mk I guns, each with 200 rounds. They were shipped on shielded single-pivot mounts fitted along the upper deck and the forward shelter deck. This high position allowed them to be worked during heavy weather, as they were less affected by waves and spray compared with the casemate mounts of earlier British capital ships. Two of these guns on the shelter deck were temporarily replaced by QF 4-inch (102 mm) Mk V anti-aircraft (AA) guns between 1938 and 1939. All the 5.5-inch guns were removed during another refit in 1940.

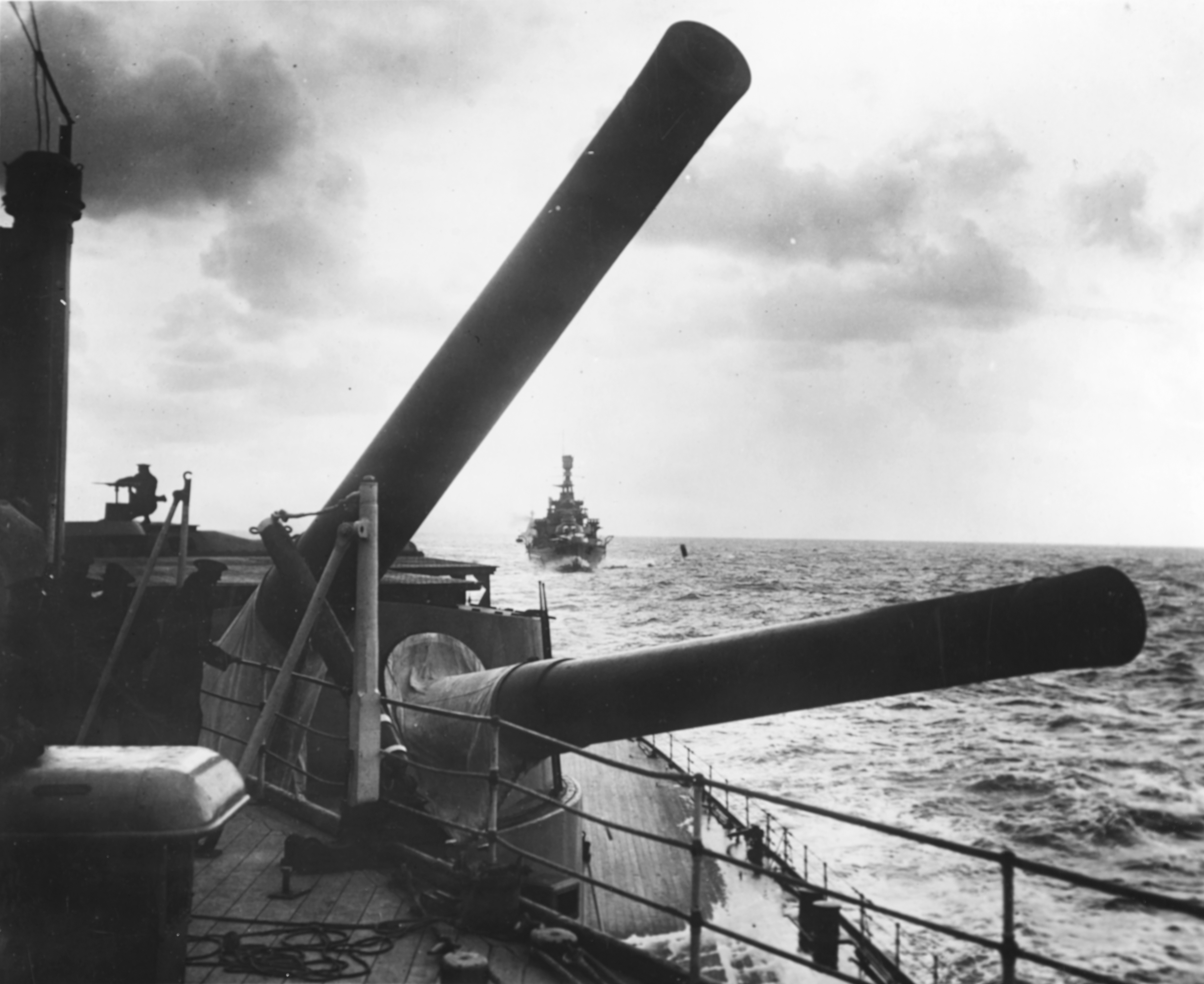
A close-up of Hood's aft 15-inch guns in 1926, rotated to the extreme arc of their travel, covering the port bow quarter; firing in this position could cause blast damage to the deck and superstructure

The ship's original anti-aircraft armament consisted of four QF 4-inch Mk V guns on single mounts. These were joined in early 1939 by four twin mounts for the QF 4-inch Mark XVI dual-purpose gun. The single guns were removed in mid-1939 and a further three twin Mark XIX mounts were added in early 1940. In 1931, a pair of octuple mountings for the 40-millimetre (1.6 in) QF 2-pounder Mk VIII gun "pom-pom" were added on the shelter deck, abreast of the funnels, and a third mount was added in 1937. Two quadruple mountings for the Vickers 0.5-inch (12.7 mm) Mk III machine gun were added in 1933 with two more mountings added in 1937. To these were added five unrotated projectile (UP) launchers in 1940, each launcher carrying 20 seven-inch (178 mm) rockets. When they detonated, the rockets shot out lengths of cable that were kept aloft by parachutes; the cable was intended to snag aircraft and draw up the small aerial mine that would destroy the aircraft.

The Admirals were fitted with six fixed 21-inch (533 mm) torpedo tubes, three on each broadside. Two of these were submerged forward of 'A' turret's magazine and the other four were above water, abaft the rear funnel. About 28 torpedoes were carried.

=== Fire control ===
The ship's main battery was controlled by two fire-control directors. One was mounted above the conning tower, protected by an armoured hood, and was fitted with a 30-foot (9.1 m) rangefinder. The other was fitted in the spotting top above the tripod foremast and equipped with a 15-foot (4.6 m) rangefinder. Each turret was also fitted with a 30-foot (9.1 m) rangefinder. The secondary armament was primarily controlled by directors mounted on each side of the bridge. They were supplemented by two additional control positions in the fore-top, which were provided with 9-foot (2.7 m) rangefinders, fitted in 1924–1925. The antiaircraft guns were controlled by a simple high-angle 2-metre (6 ft 7 in) rangefinder mounted on the aft control position, fitted in 1926–1927. Three torpedo-control towers were fitted, each with a 15-foot (4.6 m) rangefinder. One was on each side of the amidships control tower and the third was on the centreline abaft the aft control position.

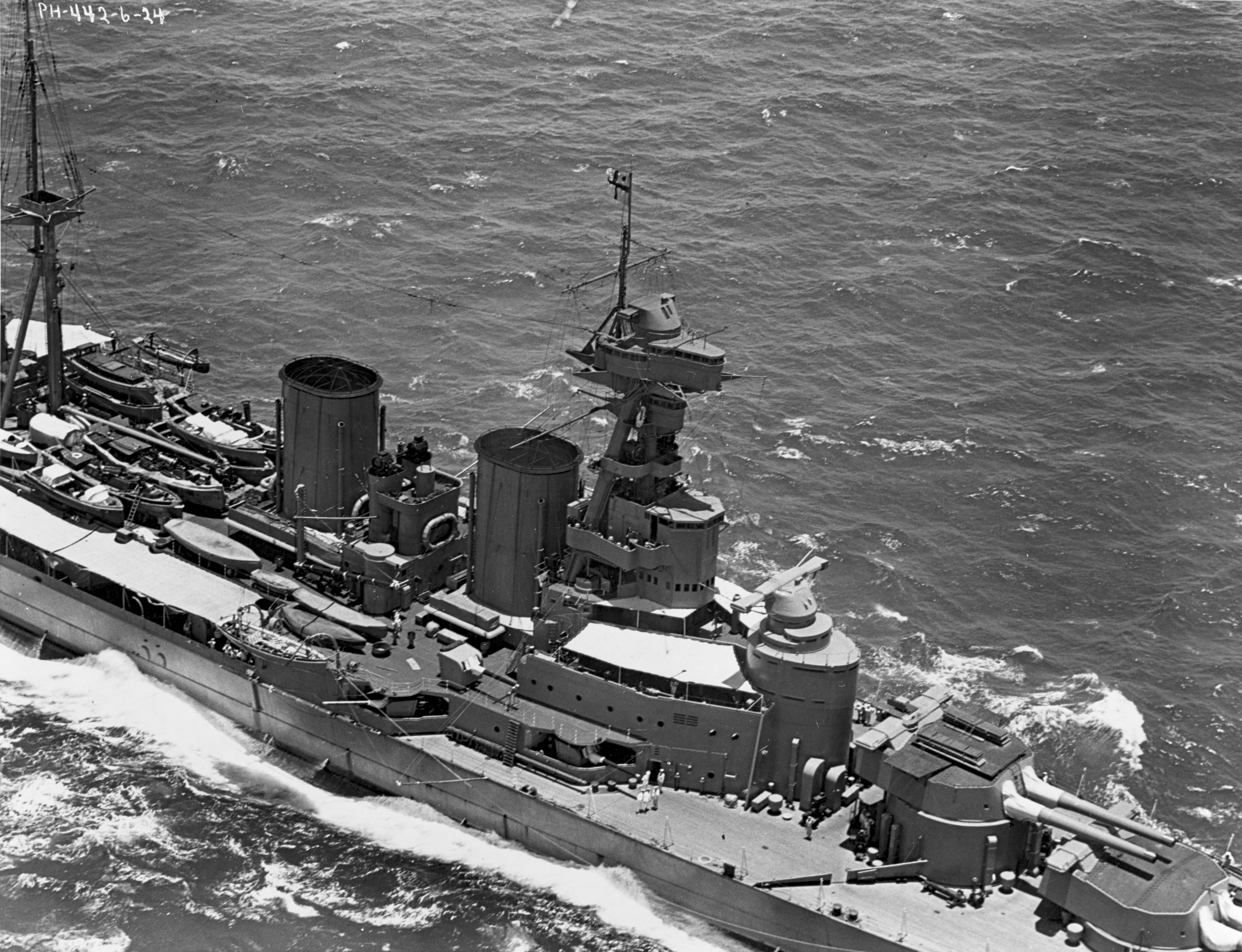
An aerial view of Hood in 1924: The two forward gun turrets are visible with their prominent rangefinders projecting from the rear of the turret. Behind the turret is the conning tower surmounted by the main fire-control director with its own rangefinder. The secondary director is mounted on the roof of the spotting top on the tripod foremast.

During the 1929–1931 refit, a high-angle control system (HACS) Mark I director was added on the rear searchlight platform and two positions for 2-pounder "pom-pom" antiaircraft directors were added at the rear of the spotting top, although only one director was initially fitted. The 5.5-inch control positions and their rangefinders on the spotting top were removed during the 1932 refit. In 1934, the "pom-pom" directors were moved to the former locations of the 5.5-inch control positions on the spotting top and the 9-foot (2.7 m) rangefinders for the 5.5-inch control positions were reinstalled on the signal platform. Two years later, the "pom-pom" directors were moved to the rear corners of the bridge to get them out of the funnel gases. Another "pom-pom" director was added on the rear superstructure, abaft the HACS director in 1938. Two HACS Mark III directors were added to the aft end of the signal platform the following year, and the Mark I director aft was replaced by a Mark III.

During Hood's last refit in 1941, a Type 279 early-warning radar for aircraft and surface vessels and a Type 284 gunnery radar were installed, although the Type 279 radar lacked its receiving aerial and was inoperable according to Roberts. An Admiralty document indicates however that, following the 1941 refit at Rosyth, Hood's Type 279 radar was indeed functional. The early-warning radar was of a modified type, known as Type 279M, the difference between this and Type 279 being the number of aerials. While Type 279 used two aerials, a transmitter and a receiver, the Type 279M used only a single transceiver aerial. Hood reported an accuracy of 3 degrees with her 279M set.

=== Protection ===
The armour scheme of the Admirals was originally based on that of the battlecruiser Tiger with an 8-inch (203 mm) waterline belt. Unlike Tiger, the armour was angled outwards 12° from the waterline to increase its relative thickness in relation to flat-trajectory shells. This change increased the ship's vulnerability to plunging (high-trajectory) shells, as it exposed more of the vulnerable deck armour. Some 5,000 long tons (5,100 t) of armour were added to the design in late 1916, based on British experiences at the Battle of Jutland, at the cost of deeper draught and slightly decreased speed. To save construction time, this was accomplished by thickening the existing armour, rather than redesigning the entire ship. Hood's protection accounted for 33% of her displacement, a high proportion by British standards, but less than was usual in contemporary German designs (for example, 36% for the battlecruiser SMS Hindenburg).

The armoured belt consisted of face-hardened Krupp cemented armour (KC), arranged in three strakes. The main waterline belt was 12 inches (305 mm) thick between 'A' and 'Y' barbettes and thinned to 5 to 6 inches (127 to 152 mm) towards the ship's ends, but did not reach either the bow or the stern. The middle armour belt had a maximum thickness of 7 inches over the same length as the thickest part of the waterline armour and thinned to five inches abreast 'A' barbette. The upper belt was 5 inches thick amidships and extended forward to 'A' barbette, with a short 4-inch extension aft.

The gun turrets and barbettes were protected by 11 to 15 inches (279 to 381 mm) of KC armour, except for the turret roofs, which were 5 inches thick. The decks were made of high-tensile steel. The forecastle deck ranged from 1.75 to 2 inches (44 to 51 millimetres) in thickness, while the upper deck was 2 inches (51 mm) thick over the magazines and 0.75 inches (19 mm) elsewhere. The main deck was 3 inches (76 mm) thick over the magazines and 1 inch (25 mm) elsewhere, except for the 2-inch-thick slope that met the bottom of the main belt. The lower deck was 3 inches thick over the propeller shafts, 2 inches thick over the magazines and 1 inch elsewhere.

Live-firing trials with the new 15-inch APC (armour-piercing, capped) shell against a mock-up of Hood showed that this shell could penetrate the ship's vitals via the 7-inch middle belt and the 2-inch slope of the main deck. As a result, 3-inch plating on the main deck over the slopes was added alongside the magazine spaces at a very late stage of construction and the four aftermost 5.5-inch guns and their ammunition hoists were removed in partial compensation. A proposal was made to increase the armour over the forward magazines to 5 inches and 6 inches over the rear magazines in July 1919 in response to these trials. To compensate for the additional weight, the 4 midships above-water torpedo tubes and the armour for the rear torpedo warheads were removed, and the armour for the aft torpedo-control tower was reduced in thickness from 6 to 1.5 inches (38 mm). However, the additional armour was never fitted pending further trials. As completed, Hood remained susceptible to plunging shells and bombs. The torpedo-warhead armour was reinstated during the ship's 1929–1931 refit.

For protection against torpedoes, she was given a 7.5-foot (2.3 m) deep torpedo bulge that ran the length of the ship between the fore and aft barbettes. It was divided into an empty outer compartment and an inner compartment filled with five rows of water-tight "crushing tubes" intended to absorb and distribute the force of an explosion. The bulge was backed by a 1.5-inch-thick torpedo bulkhead.

=== Aircraft ===
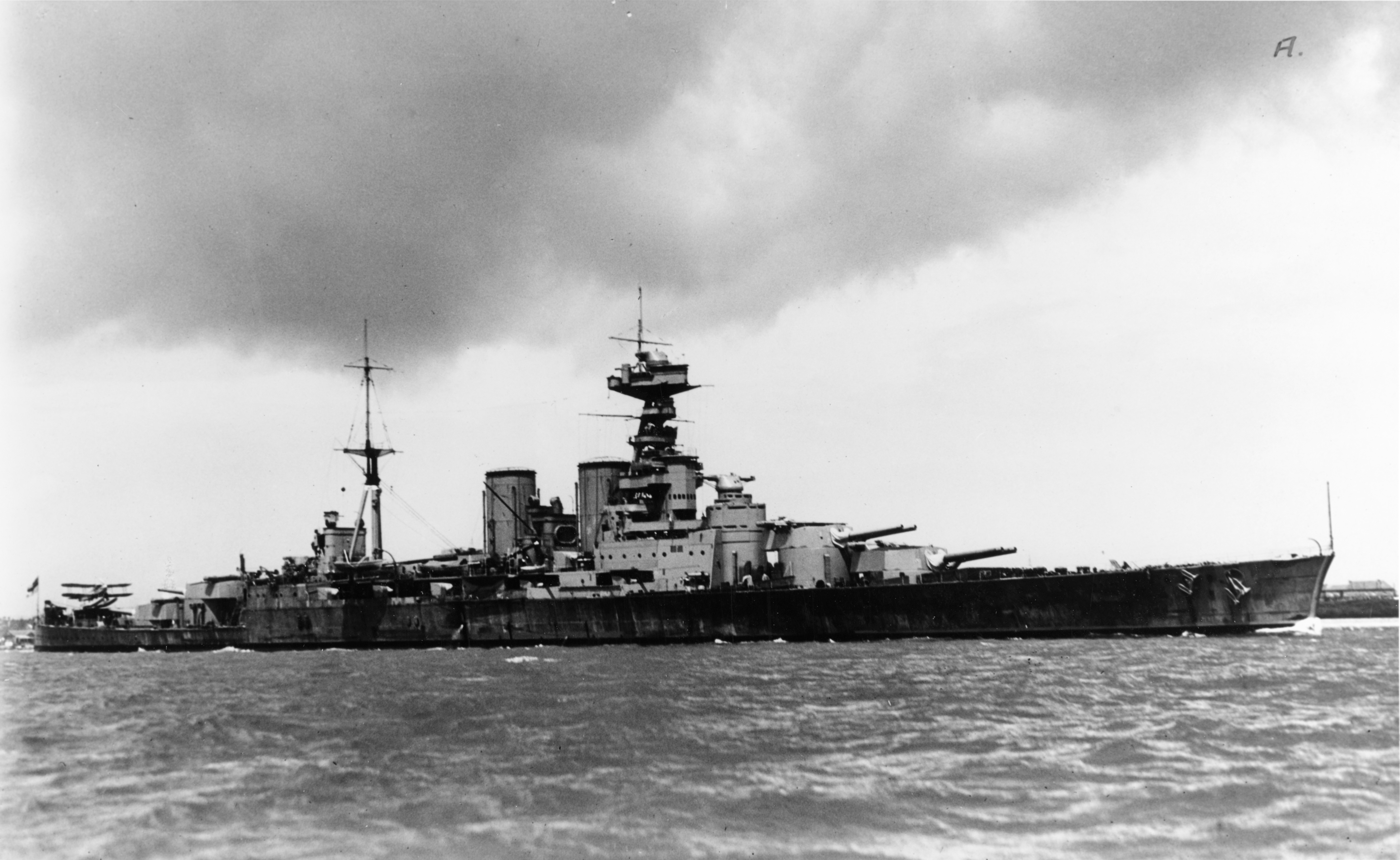
Hood after she was fitted with an aircraft catapult; a Fairey III is visible on her stern, 1932

Hood was initially fitted with flying-off platforms mounted on top of 'B' and 'X' turrets, from which Fairey Flycatchers could launch. During her 1929–1931 refit, the platform was removed from 'X' turret and a rotating, folding catapult was installed on her quarterdeck, along with a crane to recover a seaplane. She embarked a Fairey IIIF from No. 444 Flight of the Royal Air Force (RAF). During the 1932 West Indies cruise, the catapult proved to be difficult to operate in anything but a calm sea, as it was frequently awash in bad weather. The catapult and crane were removed in 1932, along with the flying-off platform on 'B' turret.

=== Battlecruiser or fast battleship ===
Although the Royal Navy always designated Hood as a battlecruiser, some modern writers such as Antony Preston have classified her as a fast battleship, since Hood appeared to have improvements over the fast Queen Elizabeth-class battleships. On paper, Hood retained the same armament and level of protection, while being significantly faster.

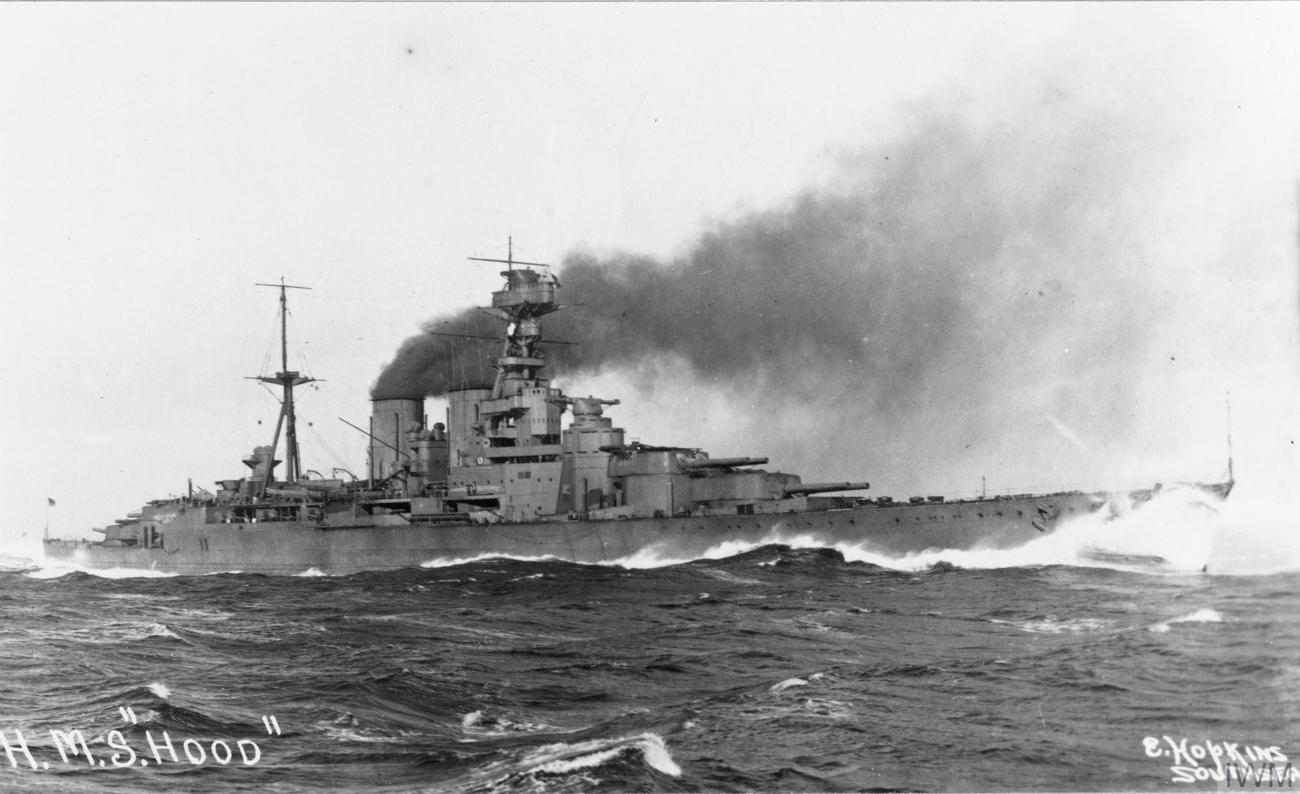
Hood on her speed trials, 1920s

Around 1918, American commanders, including Vice Admiral William Sims, commander of US naval forces in Europe, and Admiral Henry T. Mayo, commander of the Atlantic Fleet, became extremely impressed by Hood, which they described as a "fast battleship", and they advocated that the US Navy develop a fast battleship of its own. However, the US continued with their established design direction, the slower, but well-protected, South Dakota-class battleship and the fast and lightly armoured Lexington-class battlecruiser, both of which were later cancelled in accordance with the terms of the Washington Naval Treaty of 1922.

Influences from Hood showed on subsequent Lexington designs, with the reduction of the main armour belt, the change to sloped armour, and the addition of four above-water torpedo tubes to the four underwater tubes of the original design. To add to the confusion, Royal Navy documents of the period often describe any battleship with a maximum speed over 24 knots (44 km/h; 28 mph) as a battlecruiser, regardless of the amount of protective armour. For instance, the never-built G3 battlecruiser was classified as such, although it would have been more of a fast battleship than Hood.

The scale of Hood's protection, though adequate for the Jutland era, was at best marginal against the new generation of 16-inch (406 mm) gunned capital ships that emerged soon after her completion in 1920, typified by the American Colorado-class and the Japanese Nagato-class battleships. The Royal Navy were fully aware that the ship's protection flaws still remained, even in her revised design, so Hood was intended for the duties of a battlecruiser, and she served in the battlecruiser squadrons through most of her career.

== Construction ==
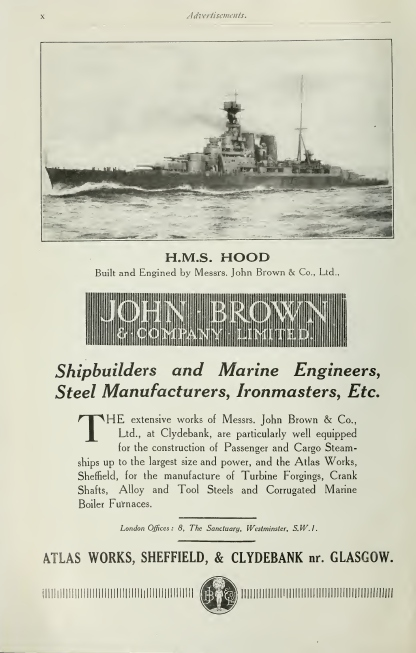
A John Brown & Company advertisement in Brassey's Naval Annual featuring Hood, 1923

Construction of Hood began at the John Brown shipyard in Clydebank, Scotland, as yard number 460 on 1 September 1916. Following the loss of three British battlecruisers at the Battle of Jutland, 5,000 tons of extra armour and bracing were added to Hood's design. Most seriously, the deck protection was flawed—spread over three decks, it was designed to detonate an incoming shell on impact with the top deck, with much of the energy being absorbed as the exploding shell had to penetrate the armour of the next two decks. The development of effective time-delay shells at the end of the First World War made this scheme much less effective, as the intact shell would penetrate layers of weak armour and explode deep inside the ship. In addition, she was grossly overweight compared to her original design, making her a wet ship with a highly stressed structure.

She was launched on 22 August 1918 by the widow of Rear-Admiral Sir Horace Hood, a great-great-grandson of Admiral Samuel Hood, after whom the ship was named. Sir Horace Hood had been killed while commanding the 3rd Battlecruiser Squadron and flying his flag on Invincible—one of the three battlecruisers which blew up at the Battle of Jutland. To make room in the shipyard for merchant construction, Hood sailed for Rosyth to complete her fitting-out on 9 January 1920. After her sea trials, she was commissioned on 15 May 1920, under Captain Wilfred Tompkinson. She had cost £6,025,000 to build.

With her conspicuous twin funnels and lean profile, Hood was widely regarded as one of the finest-looking warships ever built. She was also the largest warship afloat when she was commissioned, and retained that distinction for the next 20 years. Her size and powerful armament earned her the nickname of "Mighty Hood" and she came to symbolise the might of the British Empire itself.

== Interwar service ==
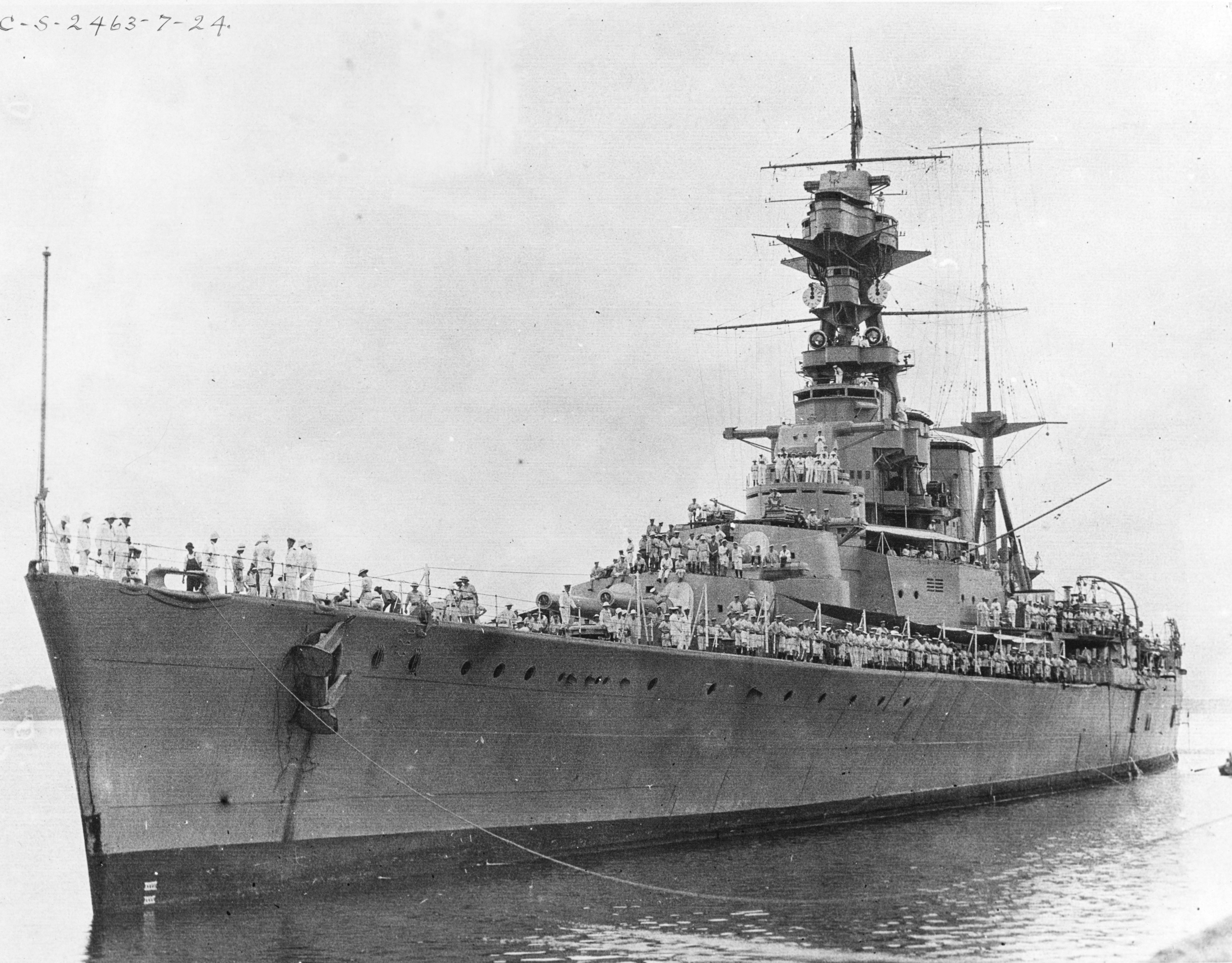
Hood in the Panama Canal Zone during her world cruise with the Special Service Squadron, July 1924

Shortly after commissioning on 15 May 1920, Hood became the flagship of the Battlecruiser Squadron of the Atlantic Fleet, under the command of Rear-Admiral Sir Roger Keyes. After a cruise to Scandinavian waters that year, Captain Geoffrey Mackworth assumed command. Hood visited the Mediterranean in 1921 and 1922 to show the flag and to train with the Mediterranean fleet, before sailing on a cruise to Brazil and the West Indies in company with the battlecruiser squadron.

Captain John Im Thurn was in command when Hood, accompanied by the battlecruiser Repulse and Danae-class cruisers of the 1st Light Cruiser Squadron, set out on a world cruise from west to east via the Panama Canal in November 1923. The objective of the cruise was to remind the dominions of their dependence on British sea power and encourage them to support it with money, ships, and facilities. They returned home 10 months later in September 1924, having visited South Africa, Australia, New Zealand, Canada, Newfoundland, and other colonies and dependencies, and the United States.

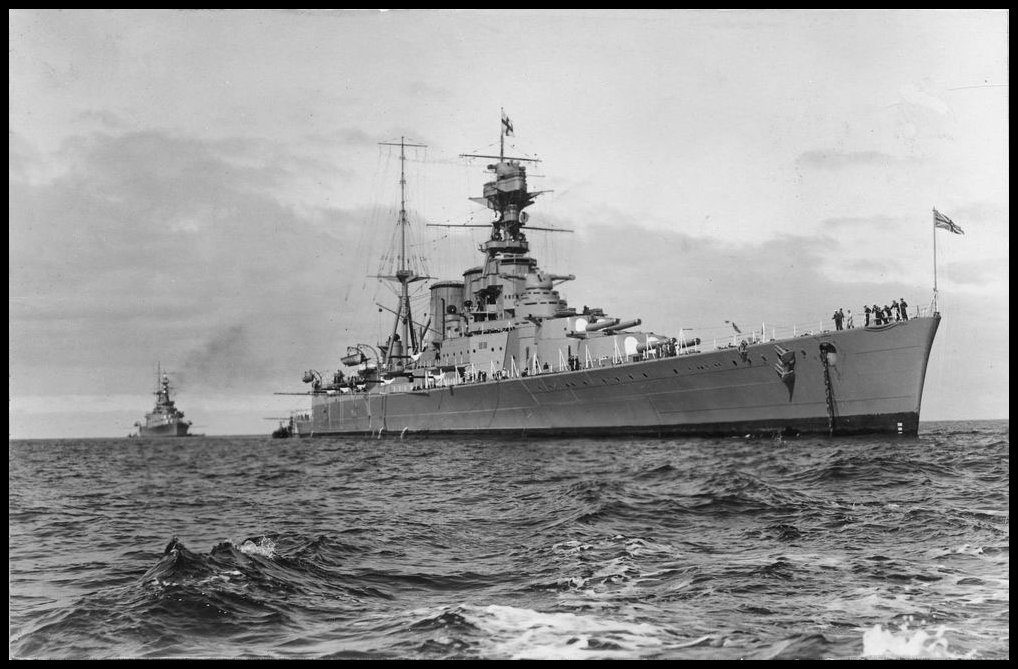
Hood (foreground) and Repulse (background) at anchor in Southern Australia during their world tour, 1924

While in Australia in April 1924, the squadron escorted the battlecruiser HMAS Australia out to sea, where she was scuttled in compliance with the Washington Naval Treaty. The battlecruiser squadron visited Lisbon in January 1925 to participate in the Vasco da Gama celebrations before continuing on to the Mediterranean for exercises. Hood continued this pattern of a winter training visit to the Mediterranean for the rest of the decade. Captain Harold Reinold relieved Captain im Thurn on 30 April 1925 and was relieved in turn by Captain Wilfred French on 21 May 1927.

Hood was given a major refit from 1 May 1929 to 10 March 1931, and afterwards resumed her role as flagship of the battlecruiser squadron under the command of Captain Julian Patterson. Later that year, her crew participated in the Invergordon Mutiny over pay cuts for the sailors. It ended peacefully and Hood returned to her home port afterwards. The battlecruiser squadron made a Caribbean cruise in early 1932, and Hood was given another brief refit between 31 March and 10 May at Portsmouth. Captain Thomas Binney assumed command on 15 August 1932 and the ship resumed her previous practice of a winter cruise in the Mediterranean the next year. Captain Thomas Tower replaced Captain Binney on 30 August 1933. Her secondary and antiaircraft fire-control directors were rearranged during another quick refit between 1 August and 5 September 1934.

While en route to Gibraltar for a Mediterranean cruise, Hood was rammed in the port side quarterdeck by the battlecruiser Renown on 23 January 1935. The damage to Hood was limited to her left outer propeller and an 18-inch (460 mm) dent, although some hull plates were knocked loose from the impact. Temporary repairs were made at Gibraltar before the ship sailed to Portsmouth for permanent repairs between February and May 1935. The captains of both ships were court-martialled, as was the squadron commander, Rear-Admiral Sidney Bailey. Tower and Bailey were acquitted, but Renown's Captain Sawbridge was relieved of command. The Admiralty dissented from the verdict, reinstated Sawbridge, and criticised Bailey for ambiguous signals during the manoeuvre.

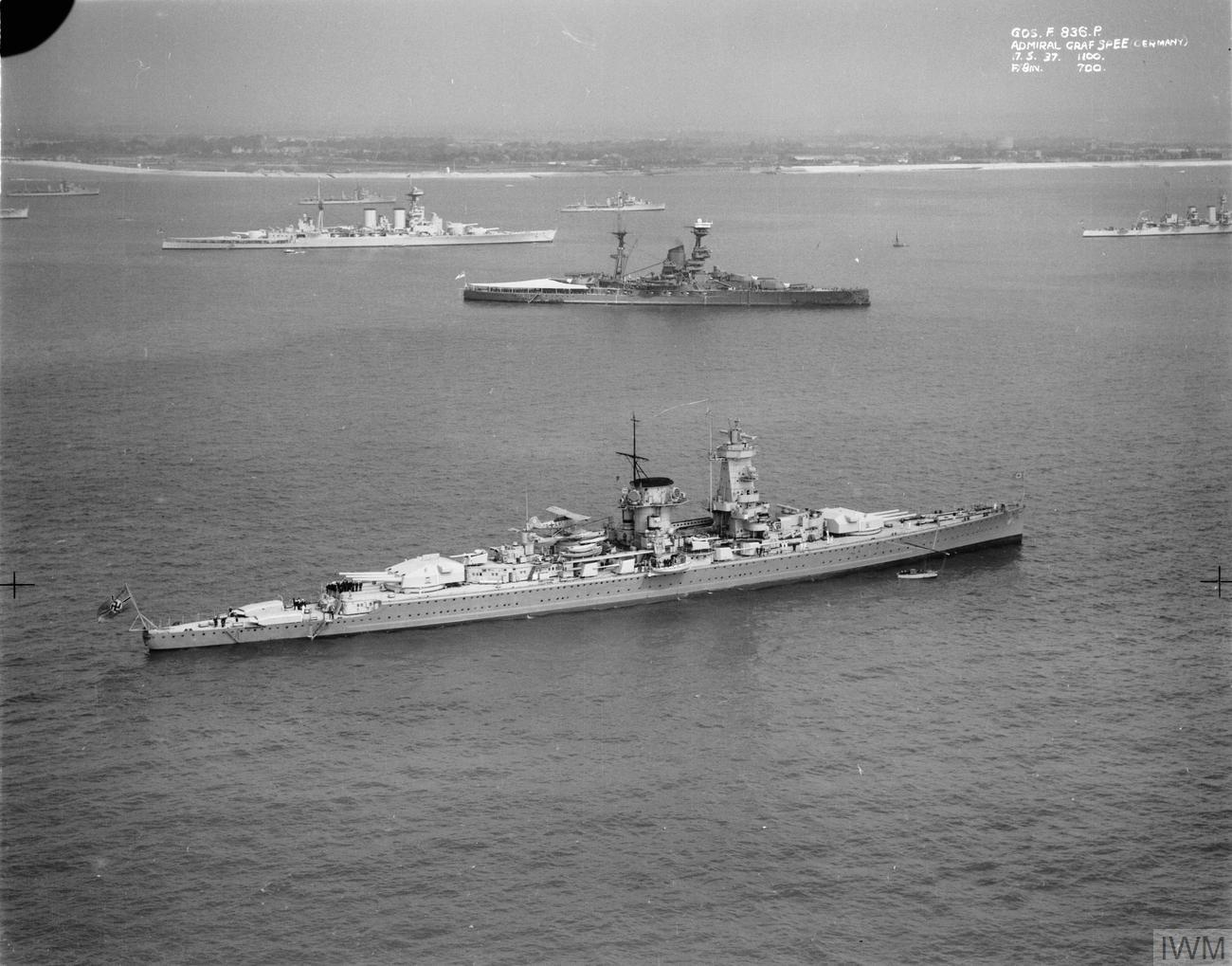
The German Panzerschiff (armoured ship) Admiral Graf Spee (foreground) with HMS Hood (left) and the battleship HMS Resolution (centre) during King George VI's Coronation Fleet Review at Spithead, May 1937

The ship participated in King George V's Silver Jubilee Fleet Review at Spithead the following August. She was attached to the Mediterranean fleet shortly afterwards and stationed at Gibraltar at the outbreak of the Second Italo-Abyssinian War in October. Captain Arthur Pridham assumed command on 1 February 1936 and Hood returned to Portsmouth for a brief refit between 26 June and 10 October 1936. She formally transferred to the Mediterranean fleet on 20 October, shortly after the beginning of the Spanish Civil War. On 23 April 1937, the ship escorted three British merchantmen into Bilbao harbour despite the presence of the Nationalist cruiser Almirante Cervera that attempted to blockade the port. Hood was refitted at Malta in November and December 1937, and had her submerged torpedo tubes removed. Captain Pridham was relieved by Captain Harold Walker on 20 May 1938 and he, in turn, was relieved when the ship returned to Portsmouth in January 1939 for an overhaul that lasted until 12 August.

Hood was due to be modernised in 1941 to bring her up to a standard similar to that of other modernised First World War-era capital ships. She would have received new, lighter turbines and boilers, a secondary armament of eight twin 5.25-inch (133 mm) gun turrets, and six octuple 2-pounder "pom-poms". Her 5-inch upper-armour strake would have been removed and her deck armour reinforced. A catapult would have been fitted across the deck and the remaining torpedo tubes removed. In addition, the conning tower would have been removed and her bridge rebuilt. The ship's near-constant active service, resulting from her status as the Royal Navy's most battle-worthy fast capital ship, meant that her material condition gradually deteriorated, and by the mid-1930s, she was in need of a lengthy overhaul. The outbreak of the Second World War made removing her from service near impossible, and as a consequence, she never received the scheduled modernisation afforded to other capital ships such as Renown and several of the Queen Elizabeth-class battleships. The ship's condensers were in such bad condition by this time that much of the output from the fresh-water evaporators was required to replenish the boiler feedwater and could not be used by the crew to wash and bathe or even to heat the mess decks during cold weather, as the steam pipes were too leaky. These problems also reduced her steam output so that she was unable to attain her designed speed.

== Second World War ==
Captain Irvine Glennie assumed command in May 1939 and Hood was assigned to the Home Fleet's Battlecruiser Squadron while still refitting. When war broke out later that year, she was employed principally to patrol in the vicinity of Iceland and the Faroe Islands to protect convoys and intercept German merchant raiders and blockade runners attempting to break out into the Atlantic. On 25 September 1939, the Home Fleet sortied into the central North Sea to cover the return of the damaged submarine Spearfish. The fleet was spotted by the Germans and attacked by aircraft from the KG 26 and KG 30 bomber wings. Hood was hit by a 250 kg (550 lb) bomb from a Junkers Ju 88 bomber that damaged her port torpedo bulge and her condensers. By early 1940, Hood's machinery was in dire shape and limited her best speed to 26.5 knots (49.1 km/h; 30.5 mph); she was refitted between 4 April and 12 June.

=== Operation Catapult ===
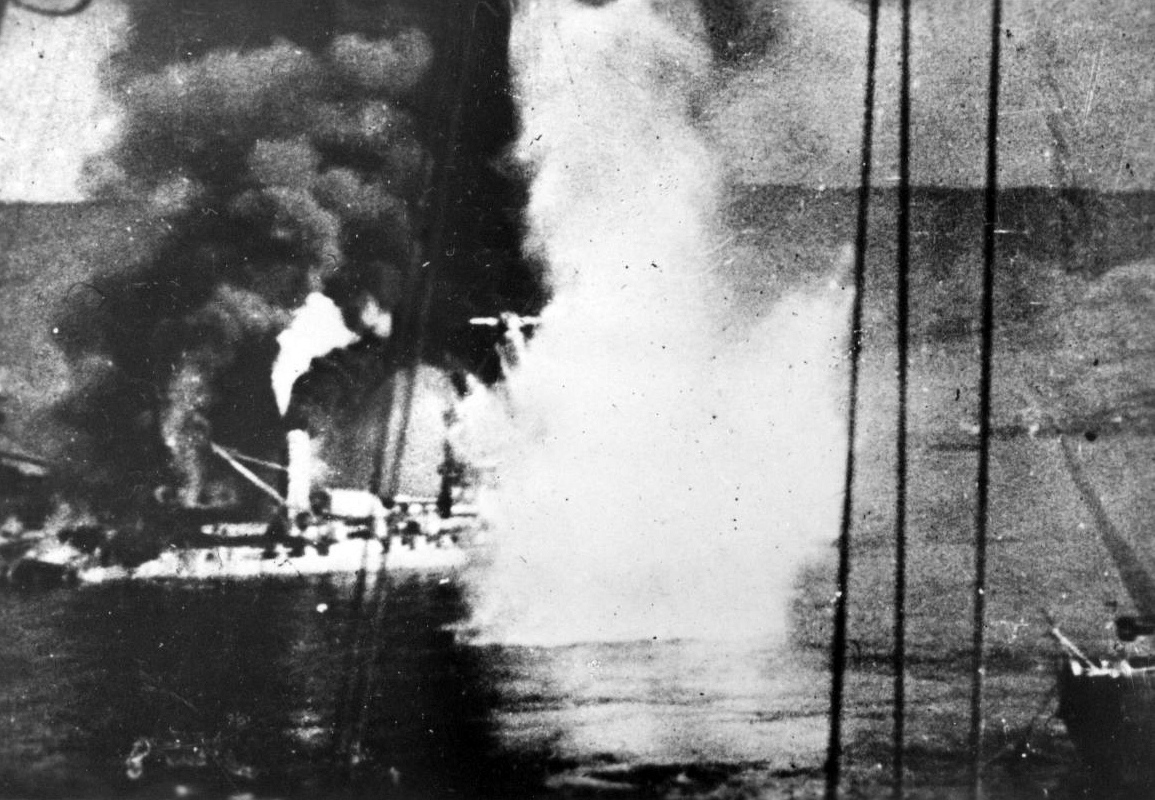
French battleship Bretagne on fire while being shelled by Hood and the battleships Valiant and Resolution, 3 July 1940

Hood and the aircraft carrier Ark Royal were ordered to Gibraltar to join Force H on 18 June where Hood became the flagship. Force H took part in the destruction of the French fleet at Mers-el-Kébir in July 1940. Just eight days after the French surrender, the British Admiralty issued an ultimatum that the French fleet at Oran intern its ships in a British or neutral port to ensure they would not fall into Axis hands. The terms were rejected, and the Royal Navy opened fire on the French ships berthed there. The results of Hood's fire are not known exactly, but she damaged the French battleship Dunkerque, which was hit by four fifteen-inch shells and was forced to beach herself. Hood was straddled during the engagement by Dunkerque; shell splinters wounded two men. Dunkerque's sister ship, Strasbourg, managed to escape from the harbour. Hood and several light cruisers gave chase, but gave up after two hours; Hood had dodged a salvo of torpedoes from a French sloop and had damaged a turbine reaching 28 knots (52 km/h; 32 mph).

=== Return to home waters ===
Hood was relieved as flagship of Force H by Renown on 10 August, after returning to Scapa Flow. On 13 September she was sent to Rosyth along with the battleships Nelson and Rodney and other ships, to be in a better position to intercept a German invasion fleet. When the threat of an invasion diminished, the ship resumed her previous roles in convoy escort and patrolling against German commerce raiders. Hood, Renown and Repulse were deployed to the Bay of Biscay on 5 November to prevent the heavy cruiser Admiral Scheer from using French ports after she had attacked Convoy HX 84, but the German ship continued into the South Atlantic.

In January 1941, the ship began a refit that lasted until March; even after the refit she was still in poor condition, but the threat from the German capital ships was such that she could not be taken into dock for a major overhaul until more of the King George V-class battleships came into service. Captain Ralph Kerr assumed command during the refit, and Hood was ordered to sea in an attempt to intercept the German battleships Gneisenau and Scharnhorst upon the refit's completion in mid-March. Unsuccessful, she was ordered to patrol the Bay of Biscay against any breakout attempt by the German ships from Brest, France. Hood was ordered to the Norwegian Sea on 19 April when the Admiralty received a false report that the German battleship Bismarck had sailed from Germany. Afterwards, she patrolled the North Atlantic before putting into Scapa Flow on 6 May.

=== Battle of the Denmark Strait ===
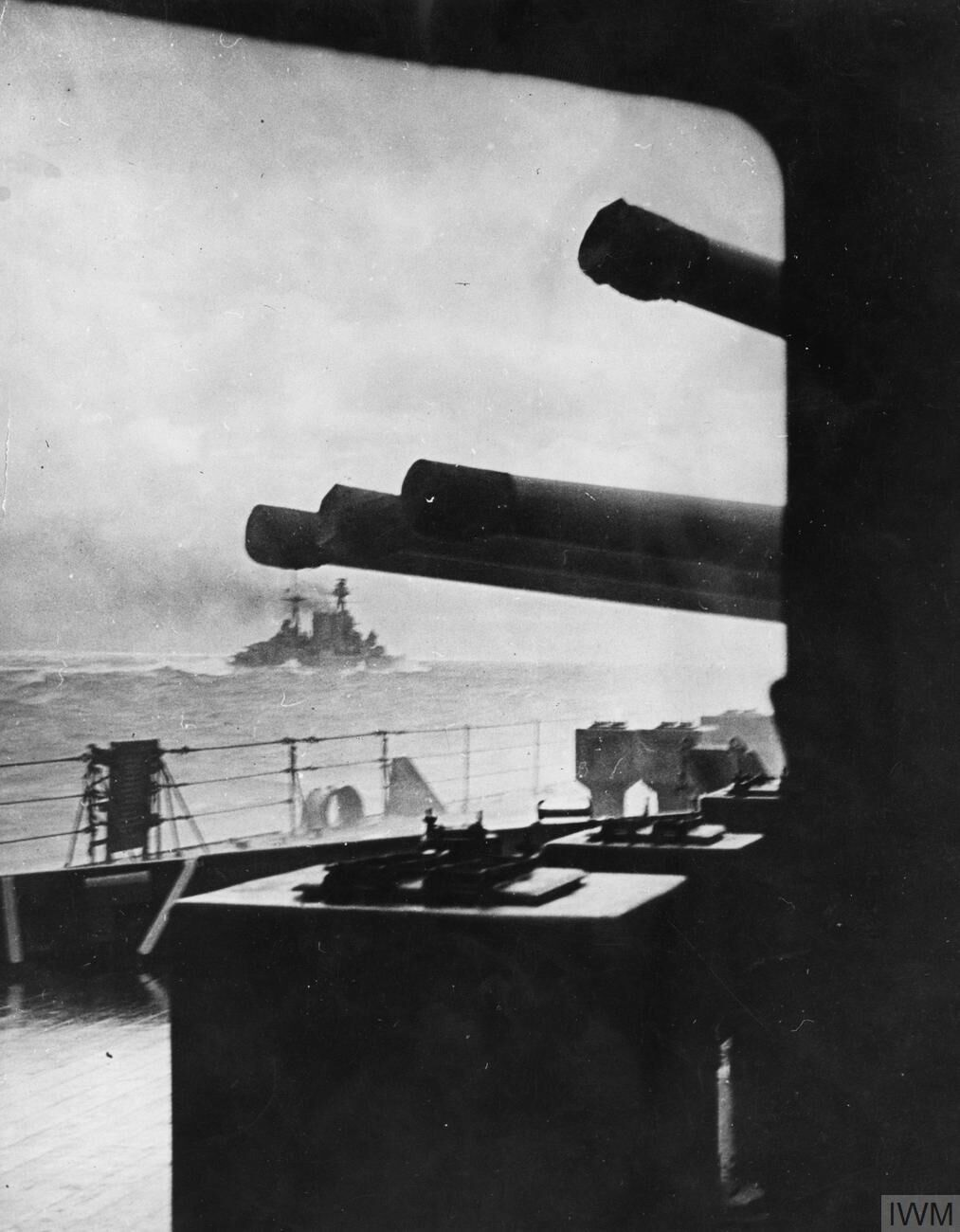
The last photograph of Hood, seen from Prince of Wales

When Bismarck sailed for the Atlantic in May 1941, Hood, flying the flag of Vice-Admiral Lancelot Holland, together with the newly commissioned battleship Prince of Wales, was sent out in pursuit along with several other groups of British capital ships to intercept the German ships before they could break into the Atlantic and attack Allied convoys. The German ships were spotted by two British heavy cruisers (Norfolk and Suffolk) on 23 May, and Holland's ships intercepted Bismarck and her consort, the heavy cruiser Prinz Eugen, in the Denmark Strait between Greenland and Iceland on 24 May.

The British squadron spotted the Germans at 05:37 (ship's clocks were set four hours ahead of local time—the engagement commenced shortly after dawn), but the Germans were already aware of their presence, Prinz Eugen's hydrophones having previously detected the sounds of high-speed propellers to their southeast. The British opened fire at 05:52 with Hood engaging Prinz Eugen, the lead ship in the German formation, and the Germans returned fire at 05:55, both ships concentrating on Hood. Prinz Eugen was probably the first ship to score when a shell hit Hood's boat deck, between her funnels, and started a large fire among the ready-use ammunition for the anti-aircraft guns and rockets of the UP mounts.

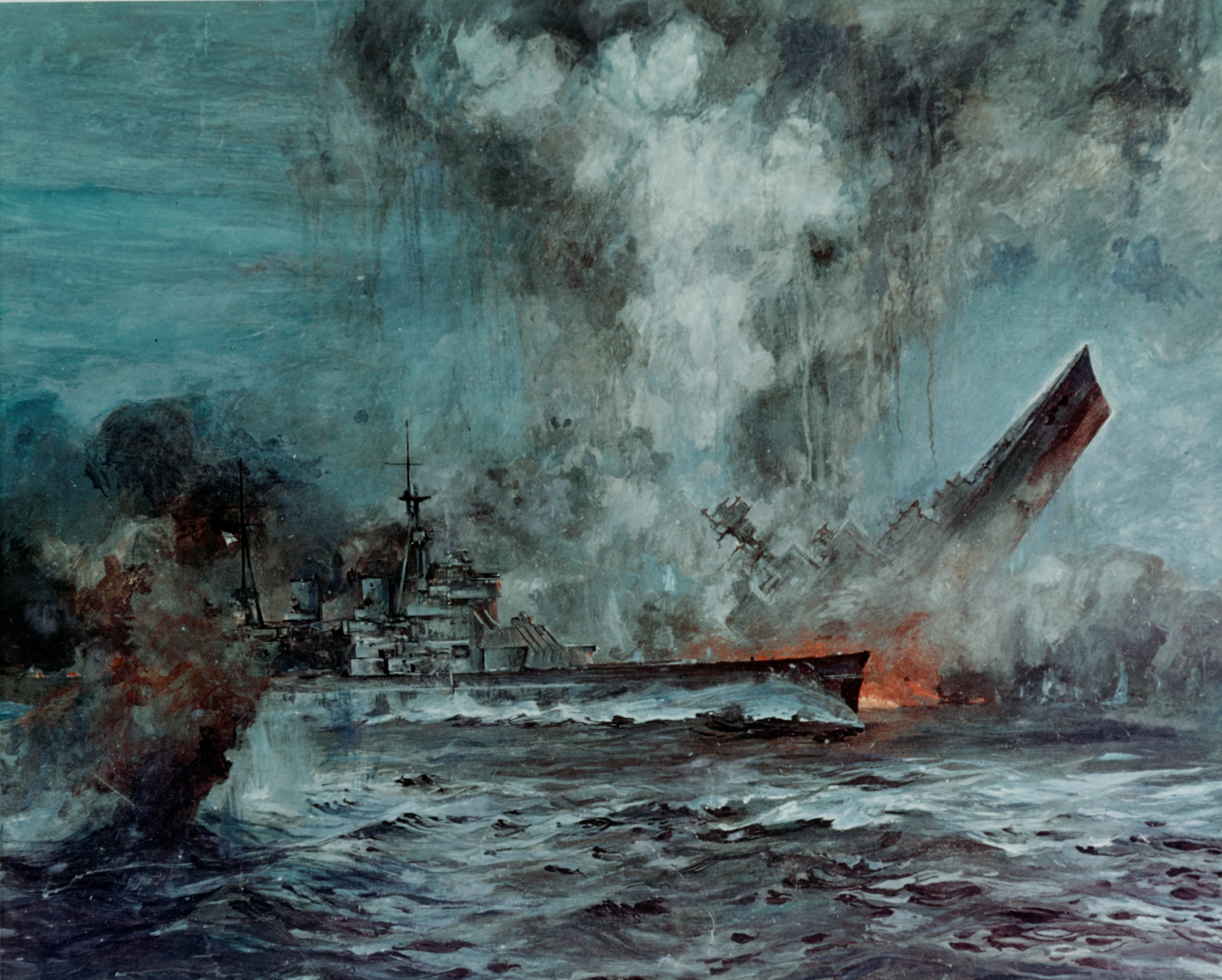
Painting by J.C. Schmitz-Westerholt, depicting Hood sinking stern first; Prince of Wales is in the foreground

Just before 06:00, while Hood was turning 20° to port to unmask her rear turrets, she was hit again on the boat deck by one or more shells from Bismarck's fifth salvo, fired from a range of approximately 16,650 metres (18,210 yd; 10.35 mi). A shell from this salvo appears to have hit the spotting top, as the boat deck was showered with body parts and debris. A huge jet of flame burst out of Hood from the vicinity of the mainmast, (Note: According to the testimony of Captain Leach, "... between one and two seconds after I formed that impression [of a hit on Hood] an explosion took place in the Hood " (Jurens, p. 131)) followed by a devastating magazine explosion that destroyed the aft part of the ship. This explosion broke the back of Hood, and the last sight of the ship, which sank in only three minutes, was her bow, nearly vertical in the water.

Only three men survived: Ordinary Signalman Ted Briggs, Able Seaman Robert Tilburn, and Midshipman William John Dundas. The three were rescued about two hours after the sinking by the destroyer Electra, which spotted substantial debris but no bodies.

=== Aftermath of the sinking ===
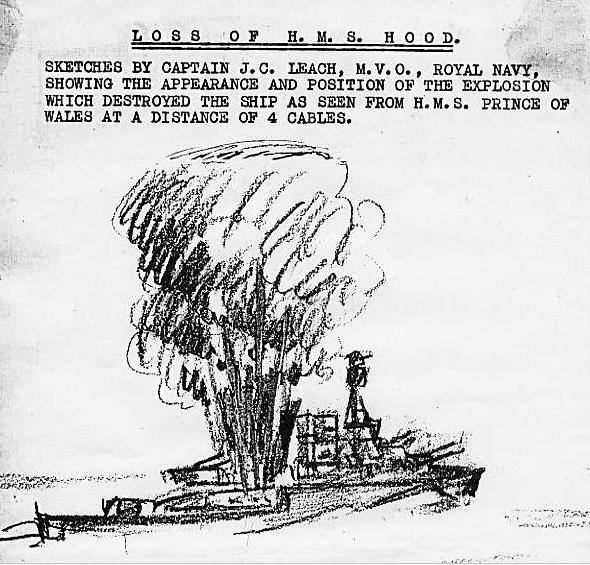
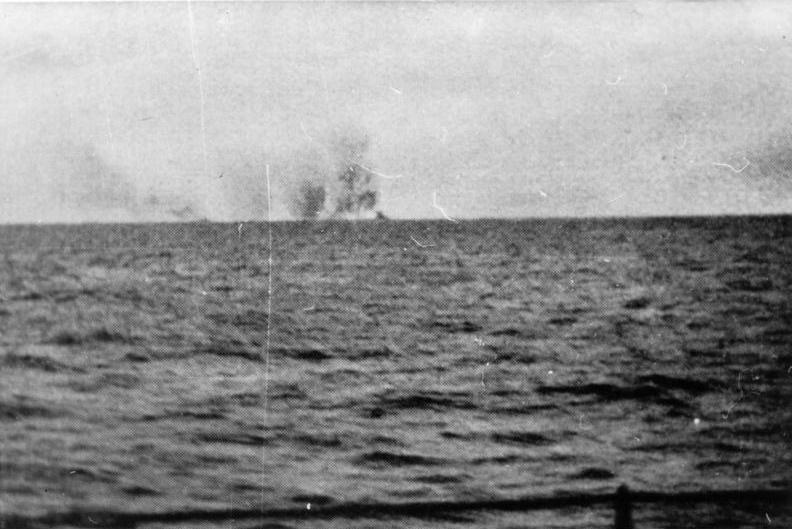
Hood during and after the explosion; black and white copy of a sketch prepared by Captain JC Leach (commanding Prince of Wales) for the first board of enquiry in 1941, and photo from the Bundesarchiv. The column of smoke or flame that erupted from the vicinity of the mainmast (immediately before a huge detonation obliterated the after part of the ship from view) is believed to have been the result of a cordite fire venting through the engine-room ventilators.

Prince of Wales was forced to disengage by a combination of damage from German hits and mechanical failures in her guns and turrets after Hood was sunk. Despite these problems, she had hit Bismarck three times. One of these hits contaminated a good portion of the ship's fuel supply and subsequently caused her to steer for safety in occupied France where she could be repaired. Bismarck was temporarily able to evade detection, but was later spotted and sunk on 27 May.

The official Admiralty communiqué on the loss, broadcast on the day of the sinking, reported that: "during the ... action, HMS Hood ... received an unlucky hit in a magazine and blew up." The first formal board of enquiry into the loss, presided over by Vice-Admiral Sir Geoffrey Blake, reported on 2 June, less than a fortnight after the loss. It endorsed this opinion, stating that:

(c) (The) probable cause of the loss of HMS Hood was direct penetration of the protection by one or more 15-inch shells at a range of 16,500 yards [15,100 m], resulting in the explosion of one or more of the aft magazines.

The Vice Chief of Naval Staff, Acting Vice-Admiral Tom Phillips and others criticised the conduct of the inquiry, largely because no verbatim record of witnesses' testimony had been kept. Moreover, Sir Stanley V. Goodall, Director of Naval Construction came forward with an alternative theory, that the Hood had been destroyed by the explosion of her own torpedoes. As a result, a second Board was convened under Rear-Admiral Harold Walker and reported in September 1941. This investigation was, in the words of one author, "much more thorough than was the first, taking evidence from a total of 176 eyewitnesses to the disaster", and examined both Goodall's theory and others (see below). The Board came to a conclusion almost identical to that of the first board, expressed as follows:

That the sinking of Hood was due to a hit from Bismarck's 15-inch shell in or adjacent to Hood's 4-inch or 15-inch magazines, causing them all to explode and wreck the after part of the ship. The probability is that the 4-inch magazines exploded first.

Both boards of enquiry exonerated Vice-Admiral Holland from any blame regarding the loss of Hood.

== Theories on the sinking ==
The exact cause of the loss of Hood remains a subject of debate, with the Royal Navy and various naval scholars and historians proffering theories. Principal contemporary and modern theories include the following causes:

- A direct hit from a shell penetrated to a magazine aft. Such a shell could only have come from Bismarck, since Prinz Eugen was no longer firing at Hood at the time of the explosion. As noted above, this version of events was almost taken for granted at the time of the sinking. Doubt first arose as a result of eyewitness testimony that the explosion that destroyed Hood originated near the mainmast, well forward of the aft magazines (for example, the sketch shown prepared for the second board of enquiry by Captain Leach of Prince of Wales). At the second board, expert witnesses suggested that what was observed was the venting, through the engine-room ventilators, of a violent—but not instantaneous—deflagration in the 4-inch shell magazines. The same deflagration would have collapsed the bulkhead separating the 4-inch and 15-inch magazines, resulting very quickly in a catastrophic explosion similar to those previously witnessed at Jutland. This theory was ultimately adopted by the board.
- A shell, falling short and travelling underwater, struck below the armoured belt and penetrated a magazine. During the same action, Prince of Wales received a hit of this type from a 15-inch shell, which travelled underwater for about 80 feet (24 m), struck about 28 feet (8.5 m) below the waterline, penetrated several light bulkheads and fetched up, without exploding, against the torpedo bulkhead. The second board considered this theory improbable, arguing that the fuze, had it worked at all, would have detonated the shell before it reached the ship. According to Jurens's calculations, one of Bismarck's shells that fell approximately 20 feet (6.1 m) short of Hood could have penetrated the side of the ship beneath the armour belt and would have detonated in the vicinity of the ship's magazines if the fuse worked.
- The ship was destroyed by the explosion of her own torpedoes. According to Goodall's theory, the ship's torpedoes could have been detonated either by the fire raging on the boat deck or, more probably, by a direct hit from Bismarck. This would have blown out the side of the ship, destroying the girder strength of the hull; the force of water entering the hole, at a speed of nearly 30 knots (56 km/h), would then shear the stern section from the rest of the hull.
- The fire on the boat deck penetrated to a magazine. Evidence given to the second board indicated that the doors for the 4-inch ammunition supply trunks were closed throughout the action. It remains possible that a door or trunk could have been opened up by an enemy shell, admitting flames to the magazine. Alternative routes for admission of flame could have been the ventilation or venting arrangements of the magazines or, as Ted Briggs suggested, through the floor of a 15-inch gunhouse.
- The explosion was initiated by 4-inch ammunition stored outside the magazines. Writing in 1979, the naval historian Antony Preston claimed that the aft magazines of Hood were "surrounded by additional 4-inch (102 mm) anti-aircraft shells outside the armoured barbettes. Such unprotected stowage could have been detonated either by the boat-deck fire or by a shell from Bismarck."
- The ship was blown up by her own guns. At the second board, eyewitnesses reported unusual types of discharge from the 15-inch guns of Hood, suggesting that a shell could have detonated within the gun, causing an explosion within the gunhouse. It is possible that, under the stress of combat, the safety measures, introduced after the disasters at Jutland to prevent such an explosion reaching the magazines, could have failed.

An extensive review of these theories (excepting that of Preston) is given in Jurens's 1987 article. Its main conclusion is that the loss was almost certainly precipitated by the explosion of a 4-inch magazine, but that there are several ways this could have been initiated, although he rules out the boat deck fire or the detonation of her torpedoes as probable causes. In Jurens's opinion, the popular image of plunging shells penetrating Hood's deck armour is inaccurate, as by his estimation the angle of fall of Bismarck's 15-inch shells at the moment of the loss would not have exceeded about 14°, an angle so unfavourable to penetration of horizontal armour that it is actually off the scale of contemporaneous German penetration charts. Moreover, computer-generated profiles of Hood show that a shell falling at this angle could not have reached an aft magazine without first passing through some part of the belt armour. On the other hand, the 12-inch belt could have been penetrated if Hood had progressed sufficiently far into her final turn.

Inspection of the wreck has confirmed that the aft magazines did indeed explode. The stern of the Hood was located, with the rudder still in place, and it was found that this was set to port at the time of the explosion. Furthermore, a section of the bow immediately forward of 'A' turret is missing, which has led historian and former Dartmouth lecturer Eric J. Grove and expedition leader David Mearns to believe that "either just before or just after leaving the surface, the bow suffered massive internal damage from an internal explosion", possibly a partial detonation of the forward 15-inch magazines.

It has been suggested that the fatal fire spread from the aft end of the ship through the starboard fuel tanks, since the starboard side of Hood "appears to be missing most, if not all, of its torpedo bulge plating".

The evidence of the wreck refutes Goodall's theory of a torpedo explosion, while the eyewitness evidence of venting from the 4-inch magazine prior to the main explosion conflicts with the theory that Hood was blown up by her own guns. The other theories listed above remain valid possibilities.

In their study of the battleship Bismarck's operational history released in 2019, including its engagement with Hood, Jurens, William Garzke, and Robert O. Dulin Jr. concluded that Hood's destruction was most likely caused by a 380-mm shell from Bismarck that penetrated the deck armour and exploded in the aft 4-inch magazine, igniting its cordite propellant, which in turn ignited the cordite in the adjacent aft 15-inch magazine. Rapid expansion of the resulting combustion gases from the conflagration then caused structural failure, passing out through the sides of the ship as well as forward and upwards via the engine room vents, expelling the aft main battery turrets and causing the stern to be detached from the rest of the hull at the aft armoured bulkhead.

== Wreck ==
In 2001, British broadcaster Channel 4 commissioned shipwreck hunter David Mearns and his company, Blue Water Recoveries, to locate the wreck of Hood, and if possible, produce underwater footage of both the battlecruiser and her attacker, Bismarck. This was to be used for a major event documentary to be aired on the 60th anniversary of the ships' battle. This was the first time anyone had attempted to locate Hood's resting place. Mearns had spent the previous six years privately researching the fate of Hood with the goal of finding the battlecruiser, and had acquired the support of the Royal Navy, the HMS Hood Association and other veterans groups, and the last living survivor, Ted Briggs.

The search team and equipment had to be organised within four months, to take advantage of a narrow window of calm conditions in the North Atlantic. Organisation of the search was complicated by the presence on board of a documentary team and their film equipment, along with a television journalist who made live news reports via satellite during the search. The search team also planned to stream video from the remotely operated underwater vehicle (ROV) directly to Channel 4's website.

After footage of Bismarck was collected, Mearns and the search team began scanning a 600-square-nautical-mile (2,100 km^{2}) search box for Hood; completely covering the area was estimated to take six days. Areas that Mearns felt were more likely to hold the wreck were prioritised, and the side-scan sonar located the battlecruiser in the 39th hour of the search.

Hood's wreck lies on the seabed in pieces among two debris fields at a depth of about 2,800 metres (9,200 feet). The eastern field includes the small piece of the stern that survived the magazine explosion, as well as the surviving section of the bow and some smaller remains, such as the propellers. The 4-inch fire-control director lies in the western debris field. The heavily armoured conning tower is located by itself, a distance from the main wreck. The amidships section, the biggest part of the wreck to survive the explosions, lies inverted south of the eastern debris field in a large impact crater. The starboard side of the amidships section is missing down to the inner wall of the fuel tanks and the plates of the hull are curling outward; this has been interpreted as indicating the path of the explosion through the starboard fuel tanks.

It is further supposed that the small debris fields are the fragments from the aft hull where the magazines and turrets were located, since that section of the hull was totally destroyed in the explosion. The fact that the bow section separated just forward of 'A' turret is suggestive that a secondary explosion might have occurred in this area. Other researchers have claimed that the final salvo fired by Hood was not a salvo at all, but flame from the forward magazine explosion, which gave the illusion of Hood firing for the last time. This damage, ahead of the armoured bulkhead, could have been implosion damage suffered while Hood sank, as a torpedo room that had been removed during one of her last refits approximates the site of the break.

It was the opinion of Mearns and White who investigated the wreck that this was unlikely as the damage was far too limited in scale, nor could it account for the outwardly splayed plates also observed in that area. Bill Jurens points out that there was no magazine of any kind at the location of the break and that the location of the break just forward of the forward transverse armoured bulkhead suggests that the ship's structure failed there as a result of stresses inflicted when the bow was lifted into the vertical position by the sinking stern section. Furthermore, the current position of the plates at the edge of the break reflects only their last position, not the direction they had first moved.

The forward section lies on its port side, with the amidships section keel up. The stern section rises from the seabed at an angle. This position shows the rudder locked into a 20° port turn, confirming that orders had been given (just prior to the aft magazines detonating) to change the ship's heading and bring the aft turrets 'X' and 'Y' to bear on the German ships.

In 2002, the site was officially designated a war grave by the British government. It remains a protected place under the Protection of Military Remains Act of 1986.

=== Expeditions to retrieve ship's bell ===
In 2012, the British government gave permission for Mearns to return to the site of Hood's final resting place to retrieve one of her two ship's bells which were lying in a small open debris field some way from the wreck herself. With the backing of the HMS Hood Association, Mearns planned to return the bell to Portsmouth where it would form part of the first official and permanent memorial to the sacrifice of her last crew at the newly refitted National Museum of the Royal Navy.

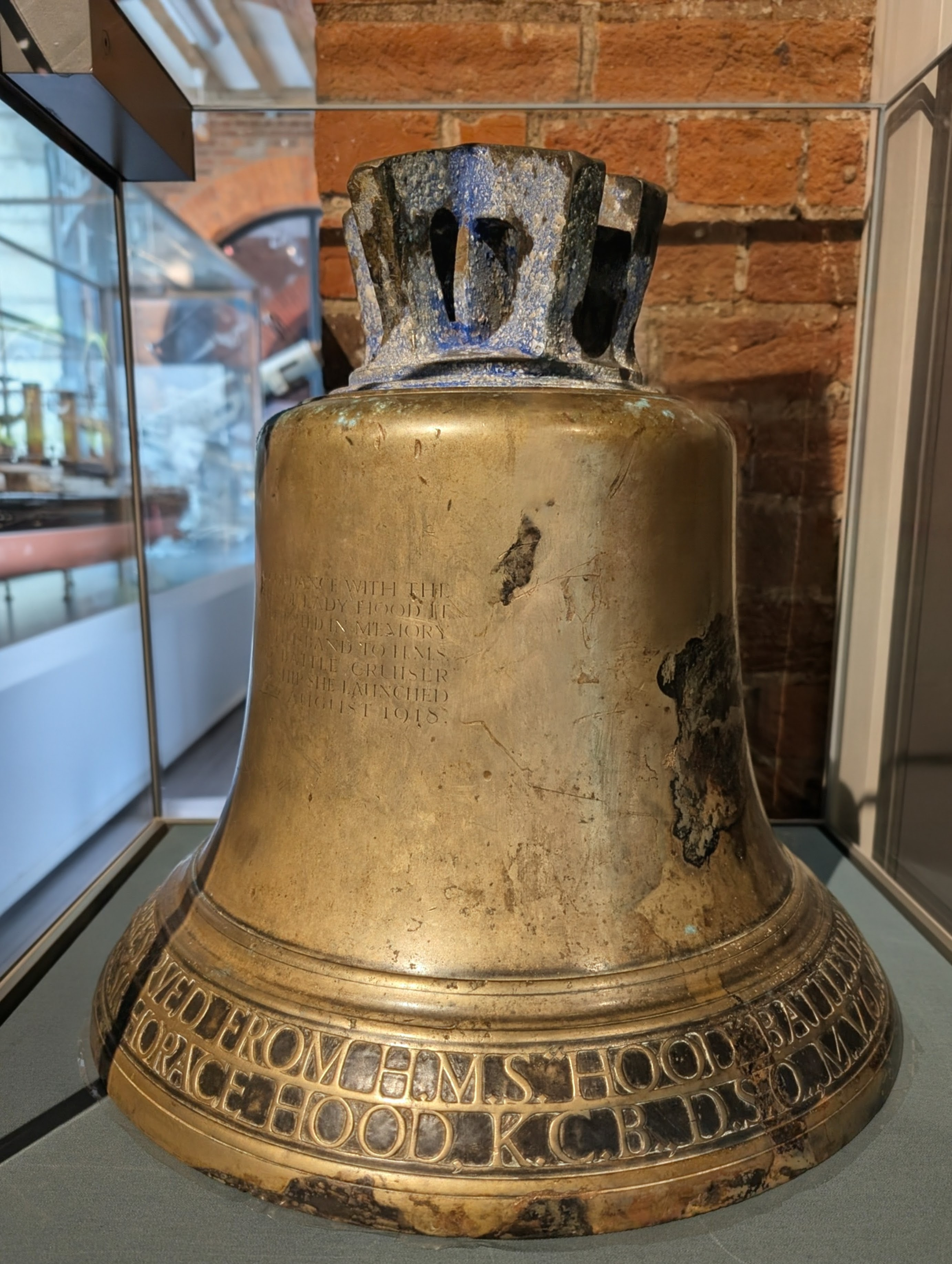
Hood's bell at the National Museum of the Royal Navy

The expedition also took the opportunity to re-film the wreck and survey her using techniques unavailable in 2001. As before, with the exception of the attempted retrieval of the ship's bell, a strict look-but-do-not-touch policy was adhered to. The original attempt, sponsored by Paul Allen and using his yacht Octopus, was abandoned after ten days in September 2012 due to unfavourable weather conditions. In 2015, the same team attempted a second recovery operation and Hood's bell was retrieved on 7 August 2015. After conservation work, Princess Anne, the Princess Royal, unveiled the bell at the museum on 24 May 2016 – the 75th anniversary of the Battle of the Denmark Strait. The bell was rung eight times ("eight bells" is noon in shipboard time) in a commemorative service at midday, attended by descendants of crew members who died in the battle, before being placed in the museum's exhibit on the Battle of Jutland.

The recovered bell was originally carried on the pre-dreadnought battleship Hood. Before being installed on the battlecruiser, the bell was inscribed around its base with the words: "This bell was preserved from HMS Hood battleship 1891–1914 by the late Rear Admiral, The Honourable Sir Horace Hood KCB, DSO, MVO killed at Jutland on 31st May 1916." There is a second inscription on the side of the bell that reads "In accordance with the wishes of Lady Hood it was presented in memory of her husband to HMS Hood battle cruiser the ship she launched 22nd August 1918." In addition to the two inscriptions, the bell still wears vivid royal blue paint work on its crown as well as its interior.

=== Surviving relics ===
Some relics from the time of Hood's sinking still exist. A large fragment of the wooden transom from one of Hood's boats was washed up in Norway after her loss and is preserved in the National Maritime Museum in London. A metal container holding administrative papers was discovered washed ashore on the Norwegian island of Senja in April 1942, almost a year after the Battle of the Denmark Strait. The container and its contents were subsequently lost, but its lid survived and was eventually presented to the Royal Navy shore establishment HMS Centurion in 1981.

A large model of HMS Hood, from her builder around the time she was laid down, is on display in the Riverside Museum in Glasgow.

Other surviving relics are items that were removed from the ship prior to her sinking:

==== 5.5-inch guns ====
Two of Hood's 5.5-inch guns were removed during a refit in 1935, and shipped to Ascension Island, where they were installed as a shore battery in 1941, sited on a hill above the port and main settlement, Georgetown, (Note: 7.92770°S 14.40654°W – corrected from Google Earth, which has a public domain picture of the emplaced weapons) where they remain. The guns were restored by the RAF in 1984.

The Ascension Island guns saw action only once, on 9 December 1941, when they fired on the German submarine U-124, as it approached Georgetown on the surface to shell the cable station or sink any ships at anchor. No hits were scored, but the submarine crash-dived and retreated.

==== Fragments of propeller ====
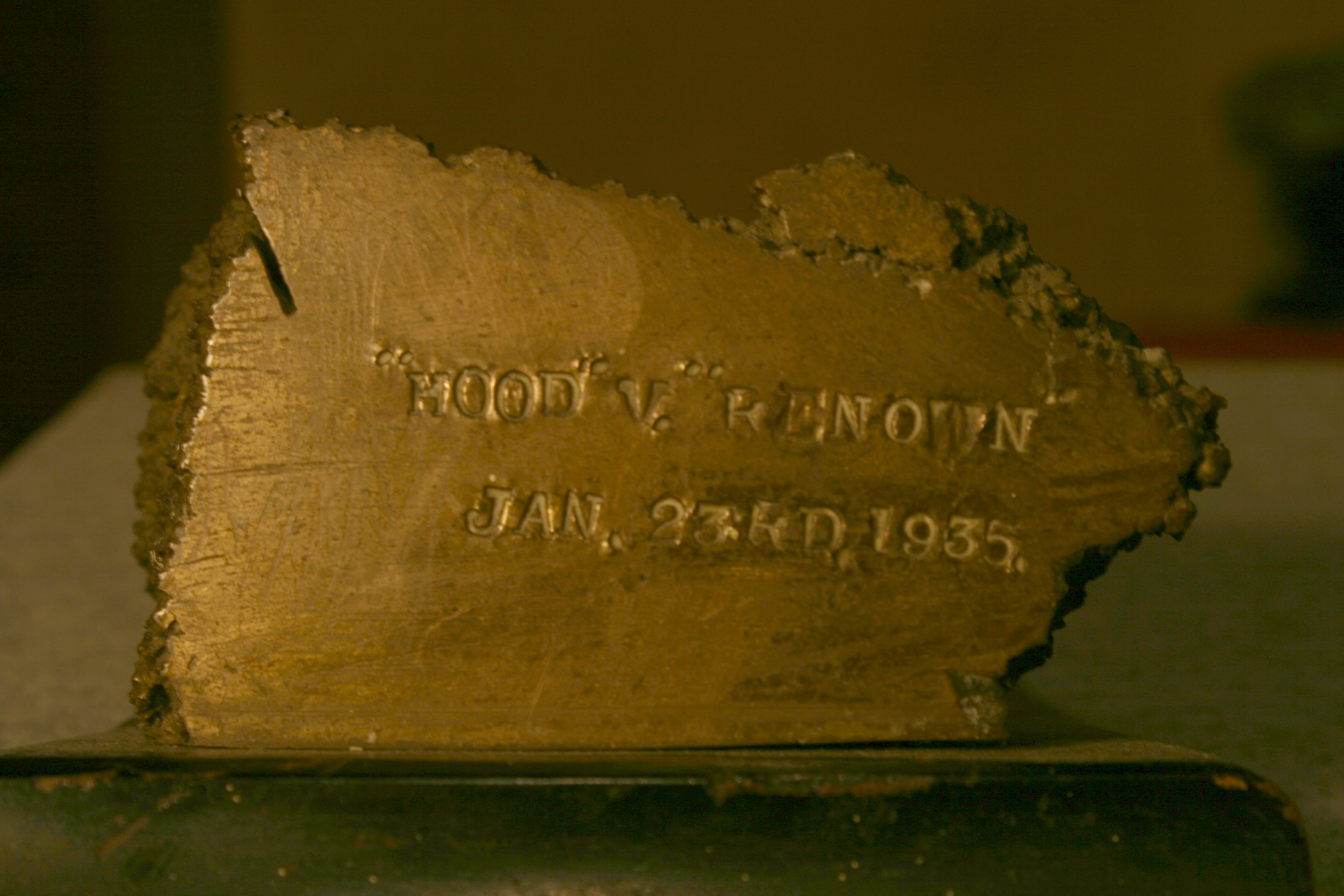
Privately owned propeller fragment

As a result of a collision off the coast of Spain on 23 January 1935, one of Hood's propellers struck the bow of Renown. While dry-docked for repairs, Renown had fragments of this propeller removed from her bilge section. The pieces of the propeller were kept by dockyard workers: "Hood" v "Renown" 23 Jan.. 1935 was stamped on one surviving example, and "Hood V Renown off Arosa 23–1–35" on another. Of the known surviving pieces, one is privately held and another was given by the Hood family to the Hood Association in 2006. A third piece was found in Glasgow, where Hood was built. It is held by a private collector and stamped HMS HOOD v HMS RENOWN 23 1 35.

== Bibliography ==
- Brown, David K. (1999). The Grand Fleet: Warship Design and Development 1906–1922. Naval Institute Press. ISBN 1-55750-315-X.
- Bastock, John (1975). Australia's Ships of War. Angus and Robertson. ISBN 0-207-12927-4.
- Burt, R. A. (2012). British Battleships, 1919–1939 (2nd ed.). Naval Institute Press. ISBN 978-1-59114-052-8.
- Campbell, John (1985). Naval Weapons of World War II. Annapolis, Maryland: Naval Institute Press. ISBN 0-87021-459-4.
- Chesneau, Roger (2002). Hood – Life and Death of a Battlecruiser. Cassell Publishing. ISBN 0-304-35980-7.
- Friedman, Norman (1978). Battleship Design and Development 1905–1945. Conway Maritime Press. ISBN 0-85177-135-1.
- Garzke, William H.; Dulin, Robert O.; Jurens, William & Cameron, James (2019). Battleship Bismarck: A Design and Operational History. Naval Institute Press. ISBN 978-1-59114-569-1.
- Buxton, Ian (2013). The Battleship Builders – Constructing and Arming British Capital Ships. Naval Institute Press. ISBN 978-1-59114-027-6.
- Hone, Trent (2011). "High-Speed Thoroughbreds: The US Navy's Lexington Class Battle Cruiser Designs". In Jordan, John (ed.). Warship 2011. Conway. ISBN 978-1-84486-133-0.
- Jurens, Bill (1987). "The Loss of HMS Hood – A Re-Examination". Warship International. XXIV (2): 122–180. ISSN 0043-0374. Archived from the original on 4 December 2004.
- Jurens, William; Garzke, William H.; Dulin, Robert O. Jr.; Roberts, John & Fiske, Richard (2002). "A Marine Forensic Analysis of HMS Hood and DKM Bismarck". The Society of Naval Architects & Marine Engineers. Archived from the original (PDF) on 28 July 2011.
- Kennedy, Ludovic (1974). Pursuit: The Chase and Sinking of the Bismarck. Wm Collins & Sons. ISBN 0-304-35526-7.
- Mearns, David (2009). The Search for the Sydney. HarperCollins Publishers. ISBN 978-0-7322-8889-1. OCLC 301679923.
- Mearns, David & White, Rob (2001). Hood and Bismarck: The Deep Sea Discovery of an Epic Battle. Channel 4. ISBN 0-7522-2035-7.
- Morison, Samuel Loring & Polmar, Norman (2003). The American Battleship. MBI. ISBN 0-7603-0989-2.
- Parkes, Oscar (1990) [1966]. British Battleships, Warrior 1860 to Vanguard 1950: A History of Design, Construction, and Armament (New & rev. ed.). Naval Institute Press. ISBN 1-55750-075-4.
- Preston, Antony (1979). Sea Power: A Modern Illustrated Military History. Phoebus Publishing Company. ISBN 0-89673-011-5.
- Preston, Antony (2002). The World's Worst Warships. London: Conway Maritime Press. ISBN 0-85177-754-6.
- Raven, Alan & Roberts, John (1976). British Battleships of World War Two: The Development and Technical History of the Royal Navy's Battleship and Battlecruisers from 1911 to 1946. Naval Institute Press. ISBN 0-87021-817-4.
- Roberts, John (1997). Battlecruisers. Naval Institute Press. ISBN 1-55750-068-1.
- Roberts, John (2001). The Battlecruiser Hood. Anatomy of the Ship (Revised ed.). Conway. ISBN 0-85177-900-X.
- Rohwer, Jürgen (2005). Chronology of the War at Sea 1939–1945: The Naval History of World War Two (Third revised ed.). Naval Institute Press. ISBN 1-59114-119-2.
- Stephen, Martin (1988). Sea Battles in Close-Up: World War 2. Naval Institute Press. ISBN 0-87021-556-6.
- Taylor, Bruce (2008). The Battlecruiser HMS Hood: An Illustrated Biography, 1916–1941. Naval Institute Press. ISBN 978-1-86176-216-0.
