= PS Solent (1900) =

History
- Name: 1900–1901: PS Solent; 1901–????: PS Red Cross II
- Operator: 1900–1901: London and South Western Railway; 1901–????: Metropolitan Asylums Board
- Port of registry: (United Kingdom)
- Builder: Mordey, Carney (Southampton) Ltd.
- Launched: 25 August 1900

General characteristics
- Tonnage: 161 gross register tons (GRT)
- Length: 120 feet (37 m)
- Beam: 18.5 feet (5.6 m)
- Draught: 8.9 feet (2.7 m)

PS Solent was a passenger vessel built for the London and South Western Railway in 1900.

== History ==
The Solent was built by Mordey, Carney (Southampton) Limited and launched on 25 August 1900.

She was designed for a speed of 11 knots, with passenger accommodation comprising a promenade deck extending from the stern to within 23 feet for the stem, and a circular front. A saloon was situated aft, extending the full breadth of the vessel.

However, the vessel did not meet the expectations of the railway company, and was sold before registration to the Metropolitan Asylums Board, and renamed Red Cross II. The railway company ordered another paddle steamer from the same company, Solent which was launched in 1902.
