= Arthur Pridham =

Vice-Admiral Sir Arthur Pridham KBE CB
- Born: Arthur Francis Pridham; 3 June 1886
- Died: 27 January 1975 (aged 88)
- Military career
- Allegiance: United Kingdom
- Branch: Royal Navy
- Rank: Vice-Admiral
- Commands: HMS Calliope; HMS Curlew; HMS Excellent; HMS Hood
- Conflicts: World War I World War II

Vice-Admiral Sir Arthur Francis Pridham, KBE, CB (3 June 1886 – 27 January 1975) was a Royal Navy officer.

Pridham joined the Royal Navy and was in January 1903 posted as naval cadet to the battleship HMS Jupiter, serving in the Channel Fleet. He remained in her until she paid off on 31 January 1905. He was promoted to the rank of lieutenant on 1 October 1908.

He commanded several light cruisers during the late 1920s before commanding the gunnery school at HMS Excellent in 1933–1936 and then the battlecruiser Hood from 1936 to 1938. Pridham served as the President of the Ordnance Board in 1942–1945.

== Bibliography ==
- Halpern, Paul G., ed. (2016). The Mediterranean Fleet, 1930–1939. Publications of the Navy Records Society. Vol. 163. London: Routledge for the Navy Records Society. ISBN 978-1-4724-7597-8.
