= HMS Solent =

Two ships of the Royal Navy have borne the name HMS Solent, after the Solent, a stretch of water between the Isle of Wight and mainland England:

- HMS Solent (1907), a War Department submarine mining vessel Solent, built in 1885, transferred to the Navy as a storeship in 1907, and sold later that year
- HMS Solent (P262) was an S-class submarine, launched in 1944 and broken up in 1961

== See also ==
- List of ships named Solent
