= Hansjürgen Reinicke =

German naval officer (1902–1978)

Hans-Jürgen Reinicke
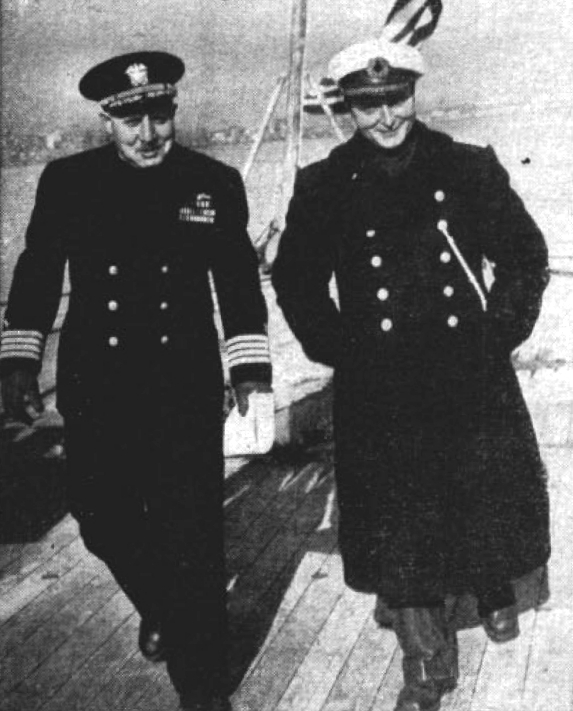
- Reinicke (right) with U.S. Navy Captain A.H. Graubart, at the Philadelphia Naval Shipyard, February 1946
- Born: 10 August 1902; Frankfurt, German Empire
- Died: 29 January 1978 (aged 75); Wuppertal, West Germany
- Military career
- Allegiance: Weimar Republic (to 1933); Nazi Germany
- Branch: Reichsmarine; Kriegsmarine
- Service years: 1922–45
- Rank: Kapitän zur See
- Units: Hannover; SSS Niobe; Berlin; Braunschweig cruiser Emden torpedo boat Leopard cruiser Deutschland; Grille
- Commands: torpedo boat Möwe destroyer Z28 heavy cruiser Prinz Eugen
- Conflicts: Spanish Civil War World War II
- Awards: Knight's Cross of the Iron Cross

Hans-Jürgen "Hansjürgen" Rudolf Reinicke (Note: Some sources concatenate his first name Hans-Jürgen and spell it Hansjürgen.) (10 August 1902 – 29 January 1978) was a Kapitän zur See, commander of heavy cruiser Prinz Eugen, in Nazi Germany's Kriegsmarine during the Second World War and recipient of the Knight's Cross of the Iron Cross.

Reinicke was born in Frankfurt and grew up in the German Empire. He joined the Reichsmarine after World War I in 1922. After a period of training on surface vessels and assignments on torpedo boats he served in various admiralty staff positions during the Spanish Civil War and in the first years of World War II. In this function, he was involved in the conceptual planning of Operation Sealion, the never attempted amphibious landing of German forces in England. Reinicke was chief of staff to Vizeadmiral Otto Ciliax during the Channel Dash, the transit of the ships of the Brest Group through the English Channel. In the last year of the war he was given command of Prinz Eugen. Prinz Eugen, stationed in the Baltic Sea, supported the German fighting retreat in the coastal region of the Eastern Front.

Following the German surrender in 1945, Prinz Eugen was handed over as a war prize to the United States. Reinicke, as a prisoner of war, co-captained Prinz Eugen under the leadership of his US Navy counterpart, Captain Arthur H. Graubart, (Note: Graubart (1901–2003) was an alumnus of the Dresden University of Technology and US Naval attaché in Berlin. He participated in the Potsdam Conference and helped in the buildup of the Bundesmarine following World War II.) during US sea trials. He was released from captivity in September 1946. Reinicke died in Wuppertal on 29 January 1978.

== Early life and career ==
Reinicke was born on 10 August 1902 in Frankfurt in Hesse-Nassau, a province of the Kingdom of Prussia. He began his naval career with the Reichsmarine on 11 July 1922 as a member of "Crew 22" (the incoming class of 1922). He received his military basic training in the 4th coastal defense department in Cuxhaven (11 July – 22 October 1922). (Note: 4th coastal defense department—Küstenabwehrabteilung IV) He was then transferred to the pre-dreadnought battleship Hannover for his on-board training.

Following his promotion to Matrosen-Gefreiter and Seeoffiziersanwärter (Able Seaman and Officer Candidate) on 1 April 1923 he was posted to the school ship Niobe (4 April – 2 July 1923). On 2 July 1923 he transferred to the light cruiser Berlin before he started the main cadet course at the Naval Academy at Mürwik on 30 March 1924. (Note: main cadet course—Hauptlehrgang für Fähnriche) Here he was promoted to Fähnrich zur See (Officer Cadet) on 1 April 1924. He then underwent a number of specialized training courses which included a torpedo course in Mürwik (1 April – 3 June 1925), (Note: torpedo course for cadets—Torpedolehrgang für Fähnriche) a pathfinder course for cadets at Kiel-Wik (3 June – 4 July 1925), (Note: pathfinder course for cadets—Sperrlehrgang für Fähnriche) a communication course for cadets at Mürwik again (4 July – 4 August 1925), (Note: communication course for cadets—Nachrichtenlehrgang für Fähnriche) a naval infantry course for cadets at the 2nd department of the standing ship division of the Baltic Sea in Stralsund (4 August – 1 October 1925), (Note: infantry course for cadets—Infanterielehrgang für Fähnriche) (Note: 2nd department—II. Abteilung) (Note: standing ship division—Schiffsstammdivision) and lastly an artillery course for cadets at Kiel-Wik (1 October 1925 – 6 January 1926), (Note: artillery course for cadets—Artillerielehrgang für Fähnriche) before he was briefly transferred to the battleship Braunschweig for further ship training (6–10 January 1926).

On 10 January, he was posted to the light cruiser Emden (10 January 1926 – 4 June 1928). During this period he advanced in rank twice, first to Oberfähnrich zur See (Midshipman) on 1 April 1926 and then to Leutnant zur See (Ensign or Acting Sub-Lieutenant) on 1 October 1926. This assignment was interrupted for the electronic measurement course (7 September – 3 October 1926). (Note: electronic measurement course—E-Meß-Lehrgang) He then sailed on Emden's first training cruise, which started on 14 November 1926 from Wilhelmshaven. The journey took him and her crew to the Atlantic, Cape Town to the Cocos Islands. Here, on 15 March 1927, the crew conducted a service in commemoration at the sinking site of SMS Emden which was lost on 9 November 1914. The trip continued to Japan, Alaska, Cape Horn, Rio de Janeiro, the Azores and Spain before they returned home on 14 March 1928. Following this training cruise he advanced in rank to Oberleutnant zur See (Lieutenant Junior Grade or Sub-Lieutenant) on 1 July 1928.

On 4 June 1928 he had been posted to the information department of the Marinestation der Nordsee (North Sea Naval Station). He served in this position until 26 September 1929. The assignment was interrupted for technical officers training in Flensburg-Mürwik (25 September – 20 December 1928). On 27 September 1929 he became first watch officer on torpedo boat Leopard in the 3rd Torpedoboat-Demi-Flotilla. (Note: 3rd Torpedoboat-Demi-Flotilla—3. Torpedobootshalbflottille) Reinicke passed his interpreter test for the English language on 2 February 1931. He was then transferred as a teacher to the torpedo and communications school in Flensburg-Mürwik (28 September 1931 – 28 September 1934). During this assignment he himself underwent diver training for officers (2–30 June 1932), a fitness training for company leaders (16–30 March 1933) and more technical training at the torpedo and communications school (2 February – 16 March 1934).

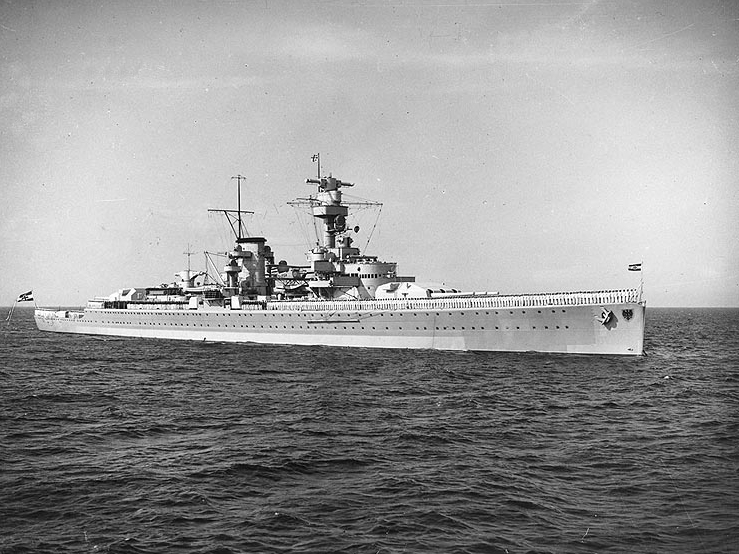
Deutschland in 1935

Reinicke, who had been promoted to Kapitänleutnant (Captain Lieutenant) on 1 June 1934, was given command of the torpedo boat Möwe in the 4th Torpedoboat-Demi-Flotilla on 29 September. (Note: 4th Torpedoboat-Demi-Flotilla—4. Torpedobootshalbflottille) He commanded Möwe until September 1936. During this command, the Reichsmarine was renamed the Kriegsmarine and the Demi-Flotilla was renamed to 4th Torpedoboat-Flotilla, effective as of 1 October 1935.

He participated in the Spanish Civil War on the cruiser Deutschland to which he was assigned on 20 October 1936. His role was 2. Admiralstabsoffizier (Asto—officer of the admiralty staff) with the Befehlshaber der deutschen Seestreitkräfte vor Spanien (Commander of the German naval forces against Spain), Admiral Rolf Carls, a position he held until 30 September 1937. He was then promoted to Korvettenkapitän (Corvette Captain) on 1 October 1937 and was sent to the Naval Academy as a teacher on 5 October 1937. Reinicke then boarded the aviso Grille, the official German State yacht, on 31 March 1938 for an admiralty cruise. On 9 April he was back at the Naval Academy of the Baltic and North Sea again, interrupted by a pathfinder training cruise on Grille (13–19 June 1938) in the North Sea.

Reinicke was posted to the Oberkommando der Kriegsmarine (Naval High Command) on 7 August 1938. Here he served with the 1. Seekriegsleitung (1. SKL—responsible for the coordination of the naval forces), as 3rd referent in the 1st department, and as Iop (operations officer) and Ia (officer of the admiral staff) in the operations department. (Note: 3rd referent in the 1st department—Referent III in the 1. Abteilung)

== World War II ==
World War II in Europe began on Friday 1 September 1939 when German forces invaded Poland. One of his tasks at the Oberkommando der Kriegsmarine was to work on an operational plan for a potential amphibious landing of German forces in England dubbed Operation Sealion. On 15 November 1939 Großadmiral (Grand Admiral) Erich Raeder instructed his chief-of-staff Vizeadmiral (Vice Admiral) Otto Schniewind to conceive a plan. Together with Konteradmiral (Rear Admiral) Kurt Fricke they devised a concept which proposed a landing 100 kilometres (62 mi) west of the Isle of Wight. Reinicke spent five days on this study and set forth the following prerequisites:

- Elimination or sealing off of Royal Navy forces from the landing and approach areas.
- Elimination of the Royal Air Force (RAF).
- Destruction of all Royal Navy units in the coastal zone.
- Prevention of British submarine action against the landing fleet.

Reinicke subsequently drafted the German plan for the invasion of Iceland, Fall Ikarus. Two years into the war, Reinicke was promoted to Fregattenkapitän (Frigate Captain) on 1 September 1941. He was appointed 1. Admiralstabsoffizier with the Befehlshaber der Schlachtschiffe (commander of the battleships), which was headed by Vizeadmiral Otto Ciliax, on 28 December 1941. In this position he was involved in the planning of the Channel Dash (11–13 February 1942), the breakout of the German capital ships Scharnhorst, Gneisenau, and Prinz Eugen from Brest to their home bases in Germany via the English Channel. While moored at Brest, the German ships were exposed to constant attacks by the Royal Air Force Bomber Command. During their stay at Brest, all three ships suffered various degrees of damage. Adolf Hitler, who feared a British invasion in Norway was imminent, ordered the ships to be relocated to Norway. The German Admiralty considered two options, a return of the ships via the Denmark Strait, or the shorter but more dangerous route through the English Channel.

The kick-off conference for the Channel Dash planning was held on 12 January 1942 when the admirals Großadmiral Raeder, Generaladmiral Alfred Saalwächter and Vizeadmiral Ciliax were summoned to Hitler's Wolf's Lair in Rastenburg (now Kętrzyn in Poland). Reinicke accompanied Ciliax to this meeting while Raeder brought his chief of staff Vizeadmiral Fricke and Saalwächter was supported Friedrich Ruge. The Luftwaffe was also present and represented by General der Flieger Hans Jeschonnek and Oberst Adolf Galland. During the operation itself, Ciliax and Reinicke initially were on board the flagship Scharnhorst. The operation was almost called off when 16 Vickers Wellington bombers attacked the ships between 19:45 and 20:30 but none of the bombs dropped damaged the ships. At 21:14 Ciliax gave the order to proceed. The following day, at 14:32, Scharnhorst struck an air-dropped magnetic mine in the mouth of the Scheldt. Scharnhorst was briefly immobilized and Admiral Ciliax and Reinicke transferred to destroyer Z29. For his service during this operation he received the German Cross in Gold (Deutsches Kreuz in Gold) on 12 March 1942 and the High Seas Fleet Badge (Flottenkriegsabzeichen) on 19 March 1942.

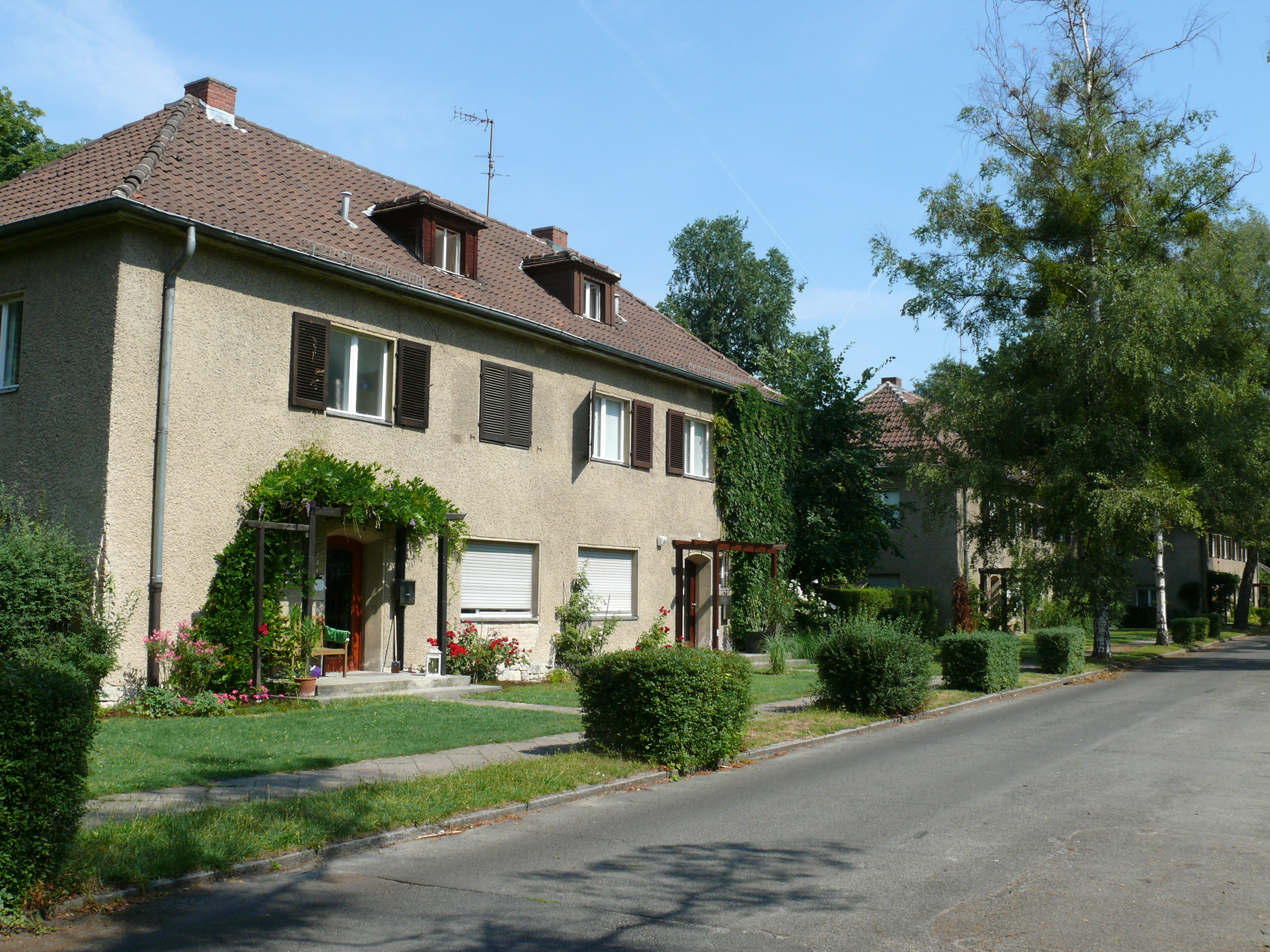
In Berlin 1943, Reinicke lived in the Marinesiedlung Berlin-Nikolassee, Marinesteig 11.

On 3 June 1942, the Befehlshaber der Schlachtschiffe was reorganized and renamed to Befehlshaber der Kreuzer (commander of the cruisers), now under the command of Vizeadmiral Oskar Kummetz. Here Reinicke continued to serve as the 1. Admiralstabsoffizier. His next posting was then with the Flottenkommando (Fleet Command) (18 October 1942 – 17 February 1943) where he served as 1. Admiralstabsoffizier to the chief of staff Konteradmiral August Thiele. On 17 February 1943 he took over command of destroyer Z28 from Korvettenkapitän Hans Erdmenger. The destroyer Z28 was undergoing maintenance at the shipyard in Kiel during his command. Reinicke did not go on any war patrols with Z28. One month later, on 11 March, he handed over the command of Z28 to Fregattenkapitän Karl-Adolf Zenker and was appointed 1. Admiralstabsoffizier with Kampfgruppe Nordmeer, at the time under the command of Admiral Kummetz. In this position he was promoted to Kapitän zur See (Captain at Sea) on 1 April 1943.

=== Command of Prinz Eugen ===
Reinicke took command of the heavy cruiser Prinz Eugen on 5 January 1944. Prinz Eugen operated north of Utö in the Archipelago Sea from 7–28 June 1944, demonstrating a show of force during the retreat of German forces from Finland. Reinicke lead Prinz Eugen in its next actions on 19 August under control of the Second Task Force later renamed to Task Force Thiele. Prinz Eugen steamed into the Gulf of Riga and bombarded Tukums from a distance of 25,000 metres (27,000 yd). The ship fired a total of 265 rounds from its 20.3 cm (8.0 in) SK L/60 guns. In parallel, the destroyers Z25, Z28, Z35 and Z36 and the torpedo boats T23 and T28 attacked further targets.

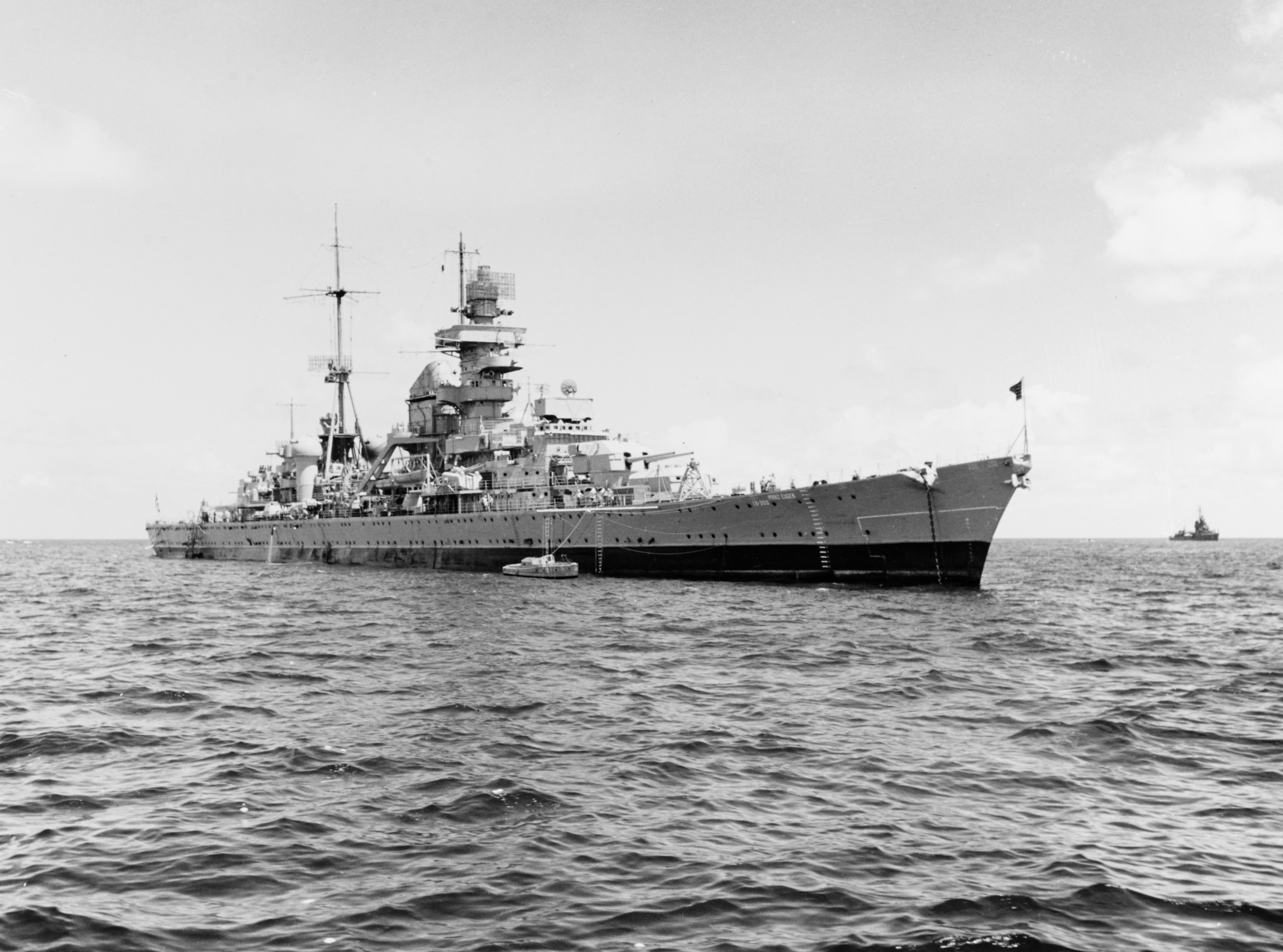
USS Prinz Eugen, before the atomic bomb tests at Bikini Atoll

Prinz Eugen left Gotenhafen on 10 October to support the defensive land battles in the vicinity of Memel. In the timeframe 10–12 and 14–15 October Prinz Eugen bombarded 28 different targets and expended 1,196 20.3 cm rounds. These actions are supported by the heavy cruiser Lützow and the destroyers Z25, Z35 and Z36. While on the return voyage to Gotenhafen on 15 October, Prinz Eugen inadvertently rammed the light cruiser Leipzig amidships north of Hela. Both ships remained wedged together and were separated on 16 October. Prinz Eugen was immediately moved to the shipyard in Gotenhafen where she received a new bow. Already on 14 November Reinicke was able to take her on sea trials.

Kurt von Schuschnigg, son of the former Chancellor of the Federal State of Austria Kurt Schuschnigg, served as an officer cadet on Prinz Eugen under the command of Reinicke. According to his account, Von Schuschnigg met Reinicke, whom he described as a "decent man who was certain to come out of this war badly" in a one-to-one conversation. Von Schuschnigg also witnessed the execution by firing squad of another cadet on Prinz Eugen who had been sentenced to death for cowardice in the face of the enemy. The cadet had fallen asleep while on active duty, and according to German military law at the time, this was punishable by death.

Reinicke took Prinz Eugen on their next war patrol on 20 November. Along with the torpedo boats T13, T16, T19 and T21, Prinz Eugen bombarded the Soviet forces on the Sworbe Peninsula for two days. Reinicke had to take Prinz Eugen back to Gotenhafen for a scheduled service of her 20.3 cm (8.0 in) SK L/60 guns. The maintenance was completed on 15 January 1945.

Supported by the destroyer Z25 and torpedo boat T33, Reinicke led Prinz Eugen in the bombardment of Soviet forces in Samland near Königsberg from 29–31 January. The objective was to support the XXVIII Army Corps under command of General der Infanterie Hans Gollnick in its breakout attempt from the bridgehead at Cranz. The ship fired 871 20.3 cm rounds of ammunition at Soviet forces, however, the advance of the 2nd Belorussian Front could not be stopped. Beginning on 10 March, Prinz Eugen supported the defensive land battles in the area of Danzig, Gotenhafen and finally Hela. In total Prinz Eugen fired 2,025 20.3 cm and 2,446 10.5 cm rounds in these battles. The heavy cruiser was partially supported by Schlesien and as of 25 March by Lützow. The German forces were evacuated from Hela in mid-April 1945 and Prinz Eugen then patrolled the sea lanes near Rügen. She was ordered to head for Copenhagen on 19 April where she arrived on 20 April. Reinicke, for his services and leadership of Prinz Eugen during these battles, received the Knight's Cross of the Iron Cross (Ritterkreuz des Eisernen Kreuzes) on 21 April 1945.

Once there, Prinz Eugen was decommissioned at 16:00 on 7 May and together with the light cruiser Nürnberg were turned over to Royal Navy control the following day. Reinicke himself had left the ship on 1 May. The Prinz Eugen was awarded as a war prize to the United States on 13 December. The cruiser was commissioned into the US Navy on 5 January 1946 as the unclassified miscellaneous vessel USS Prinz Eugen with the hull number IX-300. A composite American-German crew, including Reinicke, under the command of US Navy Captain Arthur H. Graubart, took the ship to Boston where they arrived on 23 January. Among the last Germans to leave the ship was Reinicke on 1 May, and he was released as a prisoner of war on 1 September.

== Later life ==
Reinicke was president of the Lions Club in Wuppertal from 1960–1961. He died on 29 January 1978 in Wuppertal.

== Awards ==
- Wehrmacht Long Service Award 4th and 3rd Class (2 October 1936)
- Spanish Cross in Silver with Swords (23 June 1939)
- Spanish Cross of Naval Merit 2nd Class in Silver (29 August 1939)
- Iron Cross (1939)
  - 2nd Class (27 November 1939)
  - 1st Class (19 April 1940)
- Italian Officers Cross of the Order of the Crown (6 November 1941)
- German Cross in Gold on 12 March 1942 as Fregattenkapitän with the Befehlshaber der Schlachtschiffe (commander of the Battleships)
- High Seas Fleet Badge (19 March 1942)
- Bulgarian Order of Military Merit 3rd Class with War Decoration (1943)
- Knight's Cross of the Iron Cross on 21 April 1945 as Kapitän zur See and commander of the heavy cruiser Prinz Eugen

=== Promotions ===
1 April 1923:	Matrosen-Gefreiter and Seeoffiziersanwärter (Able Seaman and Officer Candidate)
1 April 1924:	Fähnrich zur See (Officer Cadet)
1 April 1926:	Oberfähnrich zur See (Midshipman)
1 October 1926:	Leutnant zur See (Ensign or Acting Sub-Lieutenant)
1 July 1928:	Oberleutnant zur See (Lieutenant Junior Grade or Sub-Lieutenant)
1 June 1934:	Kapitänleutnant (Captain Lieutenant)
1 October 1937:	Korvettenkapitän (Corvette Captain)
1 September 1941:	Fregattenkapitän (Frigate Captain)
1 April 1943:	Kapitän zur See (Captain at Sea)

== Translation notes ==
Military offices
Preceded by Korvettenkapitän Hans Erdmenger	Commander of destroyer Z28; 15 February 1943 – 11 March 1943	Succeeded by Fregattenkapitän Karl-Adolf Zenker
Preceded by Kapitän zur See Werner Ehrhardt	Commander of heavy cruiser Prinz Eugen; 5 January 1944 – 7 May 1945	Succeeded by Captain Arthur H. Graubart
