= Naval Historical Team =

American-controlled German post-WW2 research group

The Naval Historical Team (NHT) was established by the US Navy in 1949. It was a group of German naval officers under American orders to reappraise the naval war history of World War II from the German perspective. The group was under control of the Office of Naval Intelligence. At the end of 1952, the NHT was disbanded but it was re-established in Karlsruhe in 1954.

== Overview ==
Under the leadership of Captain Arthur H. Graubart, Chief of Naval Intelligence in Germany, the NHT first met on 9 April 1949 in Bremerhaven. The staff included Generaladmiral a. D. Otto Schniewind, (Note: außer Dienst (a.D.) stands for out of office or retired.) Vizeadmiral a. D. Friedrich Ruge, Vizeadmiral a. D. Hellmuth Heye, Konteradmiral a. D. Gerhard Wagner and Oberst a. D. Gaul. Temporarily it was further augmented by Konteradmiral a. D. Eberhard Godt, Kapitän zur See a. D. Hans-Rudolf Rösing and Fregattenkapitän a. D. Karl-Adolf Zenker.

The group considered itself an incubator of a future West German Navy, an aspiration culminating in Ruge's appointment as the first inspector of the Bundesmarine, with Wagner as his deputy, in 1957. The primary interest of the US Navy was in the German war experiences fighting against the Soviet Navy, which the US Navy wanted to leverage in a possible war at sea with the Soviet Union. The findings of the NHT significantly influenced the conception of the new Bundesmarine formed in 1956.

== Bibliography ==
- Peifer, Douglas (2002), The Three German Navies; Dissolution, Transition, and New Beginnings, 1945–1960, University of Florida Press, ISBN 978-0-8130-2553-7
- Peifer, Douglas (2011).·"Establishing the Bundesmarine." In Rearming Germany, ed. James S. Corum. Boston; Leiden: Brill, 2011. ISBN 978-90-04-20320-4
- Peifer, Douglas (2005)."From Enemy to Ally: Reconciliation Made Real in the Post-War German Maritime Sphere," War in History vol. 12, nr. 2, 202–24.
