= August Thiele =

German admiral (1893–1981)

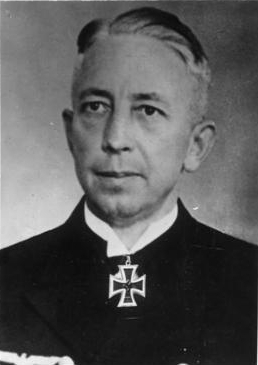
- Born: 26 August 1893; Charlottenburg, German Empire
- Died: 31 March 1981 (aged 87); Mölln, West Germany
- Military career
- Allegiance: German Empire (to 1918); Weimar Republic (to 1933); Nazi Germany
- Branch: Imperial German Navy; Reichsmarine; Kriegsmarine
- Rank: Vizeadmiral
- Commands: Minesweeper M 111; SSS Gorch Fock; SSS Horst Wessel heavy cruiser Lützow; Kampfgruppe "Thiele"
- Conflicts: World War I World War II
- Awards: Knight's Cross of the Iron Cross with Oak Leaves; German Cross

August Thiele (26 August 1893 – 31 March 1981) was an admiral during World War II and commander of the heavy cruiser Lützow. He was awarded the Knight's Cross of the Iron Cross with Oak Leaves.

Thiele received the Knight's Cross of the Iron Cross for his command of Lützow and his leadership of Kampfgruppe V (5th battle group) during the occupation of Oslo. Thiele had taken command of the battle group after the sinking of Blücher. He was appointed commander of the Kampfgruppe II (2nd battle group) in the Baltic Sea on 28 July 1944 and commander of Kampfgruppe "Thiele" on 23 March 1945. With the heavy cruiser Prinz Eugen, Admiral Hipper, Admiral Scheer and Lützow, and the ships of the line Schlesien and Schleswig-Holstein and the light cruisers Emden, Köln, Leipzig and Nürnberg he participated from sea in the land battles for Courland and in Samland.

== Awards ==
- Iron Cross (1914) 2nd Class (8 January 1916) &1st Class (29 June 1919)
- Hanseatic Cross of Hamburg (30 May 1918)
- Wehrmacht Long Service Award 1st Class (5 March 1937)
- Clasp to the Iron Cross (1939) 2nd Class (14 April 1940) & 1st Class (15 April 1940)
- High Seas Fleet Badge (1940)
- Naval Front Clasp in Bronze (12 April 1945)
- German Cross in Gold on 9 March 1945 as Vizeadmiral in Kampfgruppe "Thiele"
- Knight's Cross of the Iron Cross with Oak Leaves
  - Knight's Cross on 18 January 1941 as Kapitän zur See and commander of heavy cruiser "Lützow"
  - 824th Oak Leaves on 14 April 1945 as Vizeadmiral and commander of Kampfgruppe "Thiele"
