= German aviso Grille =

Adolf Hitler's yacht

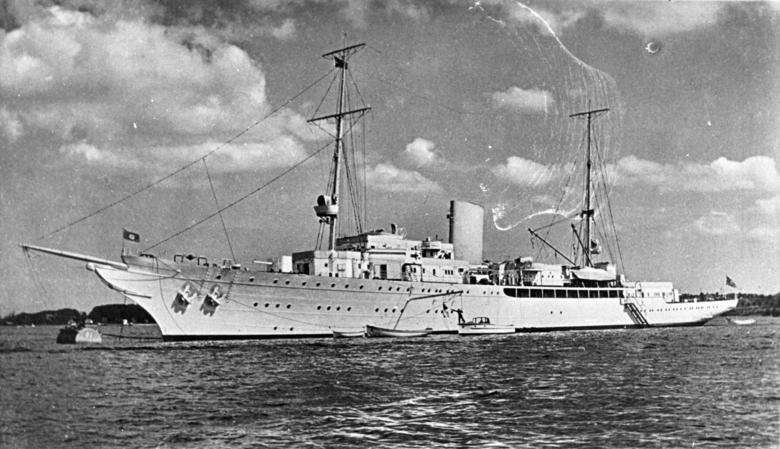
- Grille in 1935

History

Nazi Germany
- Name: Grille
- Namesake: Grille
- Builder: Blohm + Voss, Hamburg
- Laid down: June 1934
- Launched: 15 December 1934
- Commissioned: 19 May 1935
- Fate: Sold for private use 1946. Scrapped 1951

General characteristics
- Type: Aviso
- Displacement: 3,430 long tons (3,490 t)
- Length: 115 m (377 ft 4 in) (lwl); 135 m (442 ft 11 in) (o/a)
- Beam: 13.5 m (44 ft 3 in)
- Draft: 4.20 m (13 ft 9 in)
- Installed power: 2 × Benson-high-pressure steam boiler; 22,000 shaft horsepower (16,000 kW)
- Propulsion: 2 × geared turbines; 2 × screw propellers
- Speed: 26 knots (48 km/h; 30 mph)
- Range: 9,500 nmi (17,600 km; 10,900 mi)
- Complement: 248
- Armament: 3 × 12.7 cm (5 in) SK C/34 guns; 4 × 3.7 cm (1.5 in) SK C/30 anti-aircraft guns; 4 × 2 cm (0.79 in) C/30 anti-aircraft guns; Storage for 228 mines

Grille was an aviso built in Nazi Germany for the Kriegsmarine (War Navy) in the mid-1930s for use as a state yacht by Adolf Hitler and other leading individuals in the Nazi regime. The ship received a light armament of three 12.7-centimeter (5 in) guns and was fitted to be capable of serving as an auxiliary minelayer. Completed in 1935, her experimental high-pressure steam turbines, which were installed to test them before they were used in destroyers, required significant modifications and the ship finally entered service in 1937. Over the next two years, she was used in a variety of roles, including as a training vessel and a target ship, in addition to her duties as a yacht.

After the start of World War II in September 1939, Grille was used as a minelayer and as a patrol vessel in the Baltic Sea, tasked with searching for enemy merchant vessels. She collided with a German transport ship in January 1940 and after repairs, resumed minelaying duties in the North Sea, thereafter being used as a gunnery training ship. She was briefly assigned to the minelaying unit tasked with supporting Operation Sea Lion in September before the planned invasion of Britain was cancelled, and she was reassigned to the Baltic during Operation Barbarossa, the German invasion of the Soviet Union in June 1941. Gunnery training duties followed from August 1941 until March 1942, when she was reduced to a headquarters ship for the commander of naval forces based in occupied Norway; she served in this capacity for the rest of the war.

Seized by British forces as war reparations in 1945, she was later sold either to a Lebanese businessman who intended to use the ship as a yacht or a Lebanese shipping company for use as a passenger vessel. During this period, she was involved in a collision in March 1947, and in November 1948, she was attacked by a Jewish saboteur with limpet mines after the intelligence arm of the Haganah incorrectly assessed the vessel as having been intended to attack the Jewish fleet. After repairs were completed, the owner instead brought the ship to the United States in 1949 in an unsuccessful attempt to find a buyer. He ultimately sold Grille for scrap in 1951.

== Design ==
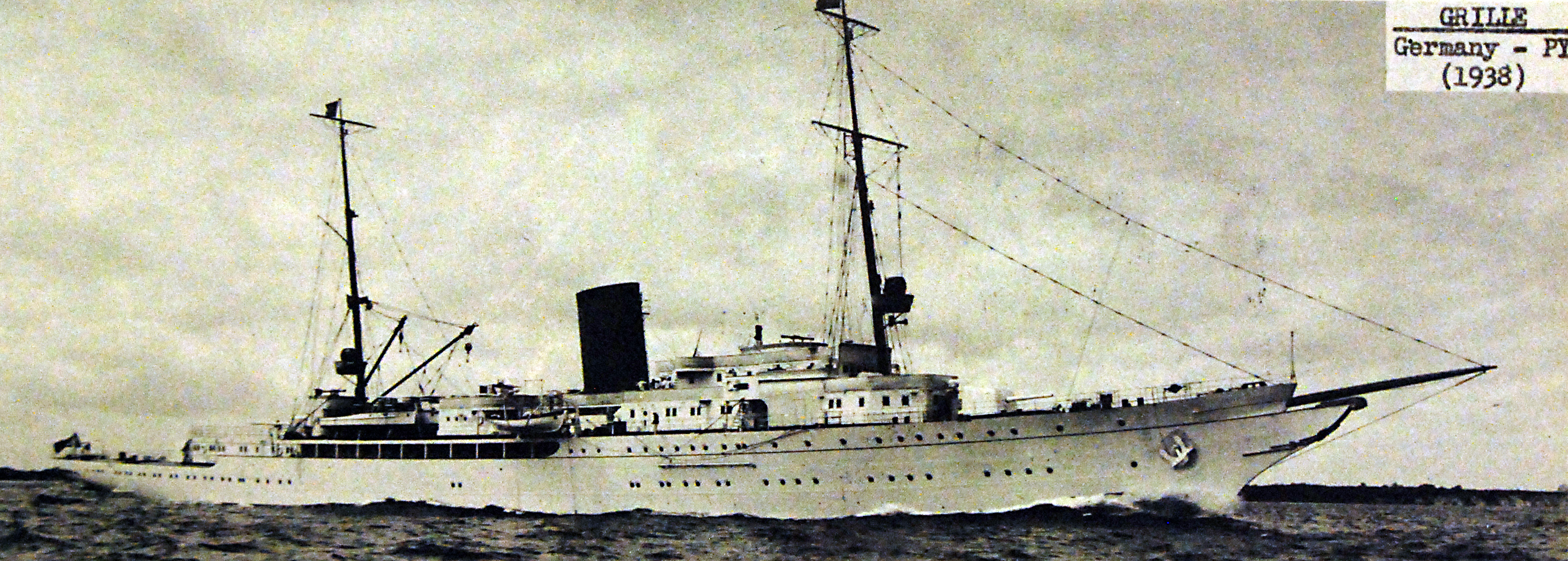
Grille sometime before the war

Grille was 115 meters (377 ft) long at the waterline and 135 m (443 ft) long overall. She had a beam of 13.5 m (44 ft) and a draft of 4.2 m (14 ft). Her standard displacement was 2,560 long tons (2,600 t), and at full load, her displacement rose to 3,430 long tons (3,490 t). The ship had a crew of 248 officers and men.

The ship's propulsion system consisted of two high-pressure geared turbines manufactured by Blohm & Voss, with steam provided by two Benson water-tube boilers that were ducted into a single raked funnel. Grille was equipped with these turbines to test them before they were installed in new destroyers. The engines were rated at 22,000 shaft horsepower (16,000 kW), for a top speed of 26 knots (48 km/h; 30 mph). She had a cruising radius of 9,500 nautical miles (17,600 km; 10,900 mi).

She was armed with three 12.7 cm (5 in) SK C/34 naval guns in individual mountings, one forward and two aft. She also carried four 3.7 cm (1.5 in) SK C/30 anti-aircraft guns in two dual mounts and four 2 cm (0.79 in) C/30 anti-aircraft guns in a single quadruple mount. Grille had provisions to carry up to 228 naval mines for service as an auxiliary minelayer.

== Service history ==
=== Construction and prewar career ===
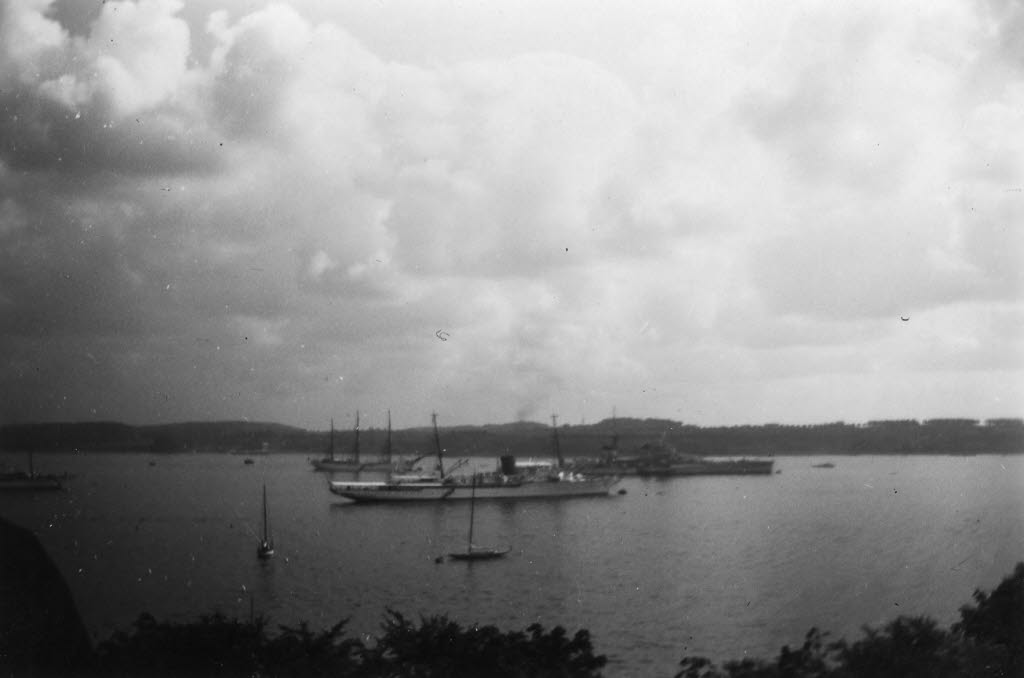
Grille with the Italian heavy cruiser Gorizia in 1936

The ship was built by Blohm & Voss in Hamburg; her keel was laid down in June 1934 under the provisional name "Flottentender 'C'" (fleet tender). She was launched on 15 December that year and was named Grille after the old aviso Grille; Konteradmiral (Rear Admiral) Eugen Lindau gave a speech at her launching ceremony. Following builder's sea trials off Helgoland, she was commissioned into the Kriegsmarine (War Navy) on 19 May 1935. Her first commander was Fregattenkapitän (Frigate Captain) Helmuth Brinkmann. The experimental high-pressure turbines with the Benson boilers proved to be unacceptable for use in warships, and Grille returned to Blohm & Voss to have the boilers replaced with a different type of boiler and control equipment for the turbines. The work was carried out between 3 October 1936 and 13 March 1937, after which the ship conducted a long-range test cruise to Iceland in July, which was completed without problems.

For the next three years, Grille served in a variety of roles: she represented Adolf Hitler as the head of state of Nazi Germany and the Oberkommando der Marine (Naval High Command), as a navigational training ship, and as a target ship during training exercises. Throughout this period, she was based in Kiel in the Baltic Sea. In May 1936, she embarked Hitler and Admiral Erich Raeder, the commander of the Kriegsmarine, and carried them to Laboe for the dedication of the Laboe Naval Memorial and observe a naval review. In October, she carried Generalfeldmarschall (General Field Marshal) Werner von Blomberg, the Minister of War on a visit to Norway, cruising as far north as Nordkapp. On the way back to Germany, she stopped in Narvik, Norway, where Blomberg and his entourage disembarked and traveled by train.

Grille next carried the Wehrmacht (Defense Force) delegation to represent Germany for the coronation of King George VI and Queen Elizabeth in mid-May 1937. The ship visited Southampton and Spithead during the voyage. In early June, she served as the flagship for Admiral Rolf Carls, the commander of the German fleet, during exercises with the fleet's scouting force in the North Sea. Blomberg again boarded the vessel in October for a cruise into the Atlantic, which included visits to a series of ports, including Funchal, Madeira and Ponta Delgada in the Azores, Portugal. In May 1938, Kapitän zur See (KzS—Captain at Sea) Günther von der Forst replaced Brinkmann as the ship's captain. Another naval review was held on 22 August for the launching ceremony for the heavy cruiser Prinz Eugen, during which Grille hosted Hitler and his entourage, which included Miklós Horthy, the Regent of Hungary, who was visiting Germany at the time. Toward the end of 1938, Grille was used as a torpedo target for the aircraft of 3. Staffel, Group 506. The ship was then assigned to the Befehlshaber der Sicherung der Ostsee (BSO—Commander of the Defense of the Baltic Sea) to support the planned Invasion of Poland. During the Kiel Week sailing regatta in June 1939, Grille hosted Raeder and several foreign naval officers.

=== World War II ===
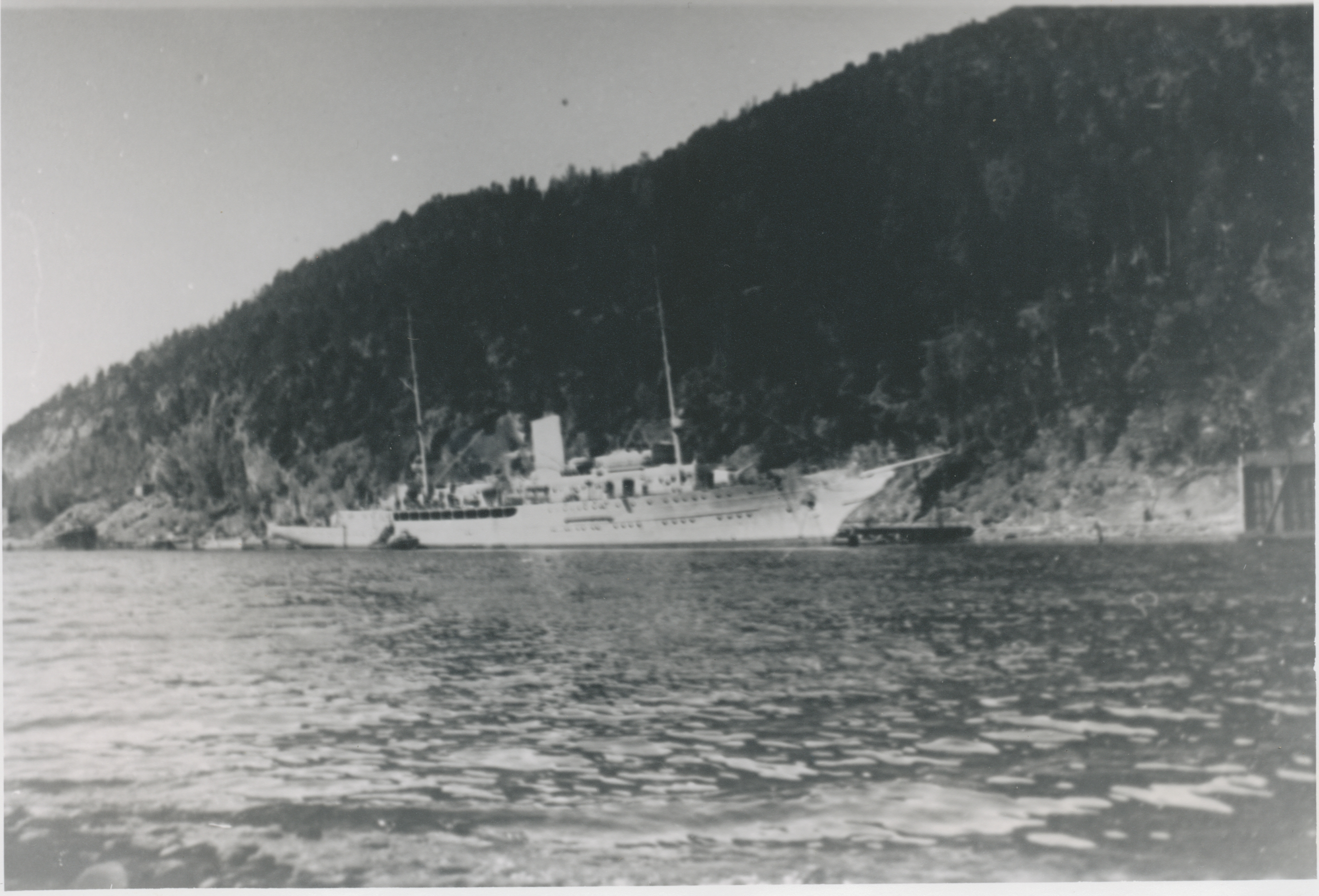
Grille in Norway during World War II

At the outbreak of World War II on 1 September 1939, Grille was mobilized wartime service. She was initially used for minelaying operations, and from 1 to 9 September, Vizeadmiral (Vice Admiral) Wilhelm Marschall used her as a temporary flagship. Marschall was at that time the Befehlshaber der Panzerschiffe (Commander of Armored Ships). Grille was transferred back to the BSO in mid-September, where she was used to patrol for enemy merchant shipping in the Baltic. She accidentally collided with the German steamer SS Axel on 10 January 1940, sinking the latter. Grille's bow was damaged in the incident and required repairs that were concluded on 5 February. The ship was then transferred to the North Sea to assist in the laying of minefields to guard against British attacks. She embarked on two operations to lay Minensperre (mine barrier) 16 in company with the light cruiser Köln and several destroyers, the first on 17–18 May and the second on 19–20 May. Grille was then attached to the gunnery school for training purposes.

For Operation Sea Lion, the planned invasion of Great Britain in September 1940, Grille was assigned as the flagship of KzS Walter Krastel, the deputy commander of mine warfare vessels under Marinegruppenkommando Nord (Navy Group Command North). She led the Eastern Group to Ostend, Belgium in early September; the Eastern Group was tasked with covering the landing beaches by laying minefields on either side to prevent the British Royal Navy from intervening. The invasion was postponed "until further notice" on 17 September, and three days later Grille and the other vessels were moved to Rotterdam, the Netherlands. The next day, the German high command cancelled the operation outright and Grille was immediately transferred back to the gunnery school. During Operation Barbarossa, the German invasion of the Soviet Union, which began in June 1941, Grille was again assigned to the minelayer command. She assisted in the laying of a minefield in the Baltic in late June, and she served as the unit flagship from 5 July to 15 August.

She was transferred back to the gunnery school on 15 August, where she served for the next seven months. During this period, she was also used as a target ship for U-boat crews. She was decommissioned in March 1942 and on 24 August, was assigned as a stationary headquarters ship for the commander of naval forces in occupied Norway. She arrived in Narvik, where on 2 October, KAdm Otto Klüber came aboard. The ship was moved from Narvik to Ankenes between 25 and 31 July 1943. She had her crew reduced there on 10 January 1944; she was still capable of going to sea, but lacked crew for her weapons. In March, the staff for the commander was reduced, and Grille was then used as a headquarters ship for the commander of U-boats in Norway, KzS Rudolf Peters. She remained in Norwegian waters until the end of the war in May 1945, when she was seized by British forces. They set up one of the rooms as "Eva Braun's bedroom", but she had never visited the ship. According to the naval historians J. J. Colledge and Ben Warlow, Grille returned to northern Germany at some point after the war, and it was there that she was occupied by British forces, in August 1945.

=== Postwar ===
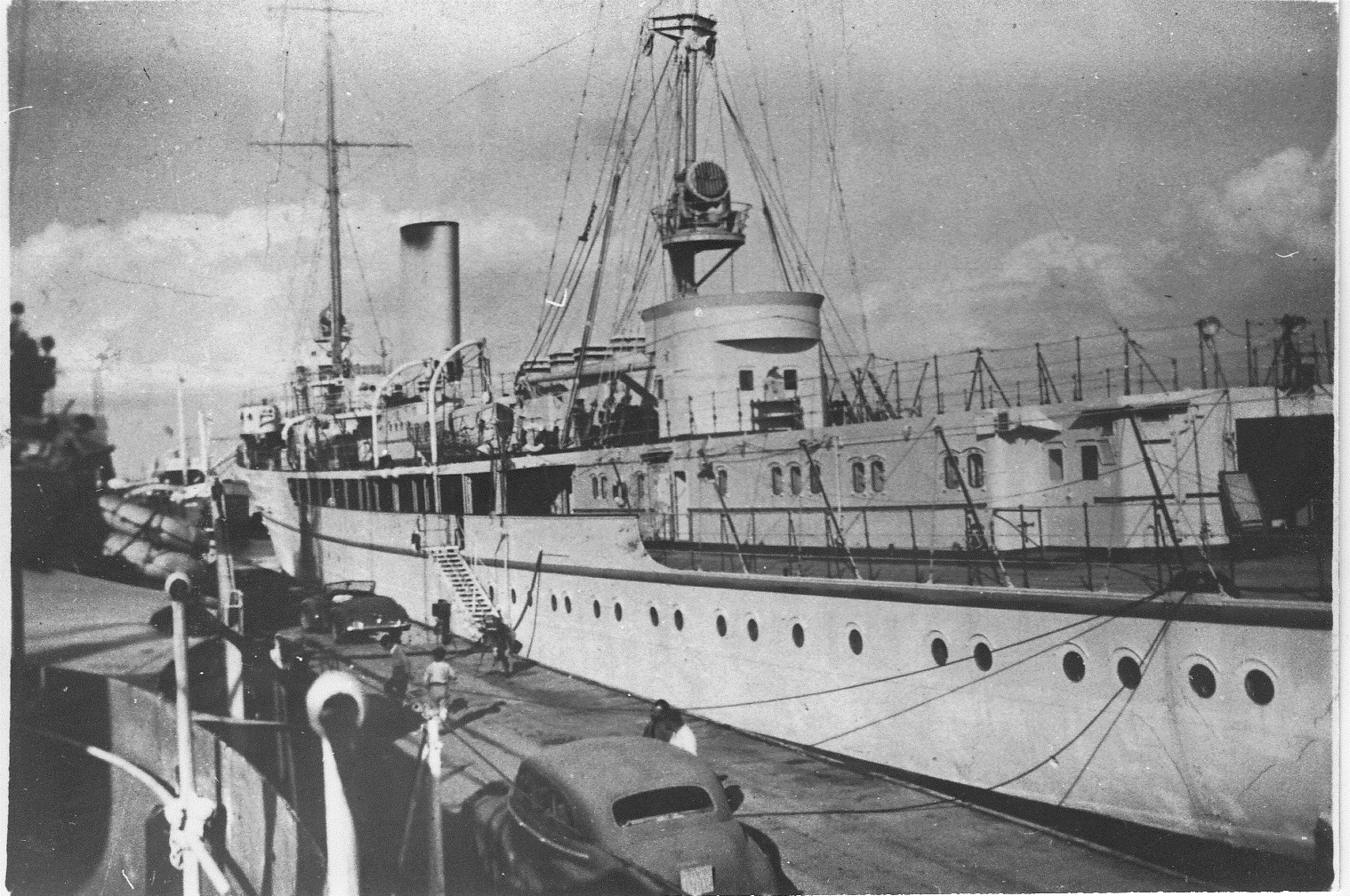
Grille in Beirut in November 1948

The ship's postwar fate is uncertain; according to the naval historians Hans Hildebrand, Albert Röhr, and Hans-Otto Steinmetz, Grille was sold in 1946 to a Lebanese shipping company for use as a passenger ship in the Mediterranean Sea. Others, including a contemporary report of the vessel's disposal in 1951, state that a Lebanese businessman named George Arida purchased the vessel for use as his personal yacht in September 1946. In March 1947, the ship was involved in a collision and repairs were completed in Beirut by November 1947, when she was re-launched from the dry dock.

In either event, the ship had been disarmed and any equipment with military use was removed by the British before the sale. The intelligence service of the Haganah incorrectly suspected that Arida or the Lebanese company intended to use the vessel for the Lebanese Navy to attack Haifa, so they sent a saboteur to attack it with limpet mines in November 1948. The mines exploded a few days later and blew a hole in the hull below the waterline, but did little serious damage and Grille was quickly repaired.

According to reports that indicate Arida purchased the ship, after he realized the very high cost involved in keeping the ship in service, he brought the ship to the United States in 1949 in an attempt to sell her. He was unable to secure a buyer, and Grille was instead moored in New York and left idle for the next two years. While there, the ship became a tourist attraction. In April 1951, she was sold for scrap to the North American Smelting and Refining Company and was transferred to the Doan Salvage Yard in Bordentown, New Jersey. The ship was broken up later that year.

Before the scrapping began, souvenir hunters removed artifacts from the vessel. The yacht's toilet was one of many relics scattered throughout New Jersey, before it was purchased by British military memorabilia collector, Bruce Crompton. A blood transfusion kit taken from the Grille forms part of the permanent collection of the Thackray Museum of Medicine in Leeds, Britain.

In October 2020 a Maryland auctioneer announced they would offer for sale a large aluminum globe-shaped bar with five barstools from the yacht.
