= Ella Graubart =

American lawyer

Ella Graubart Arensberg (September 30, 1896, in Boston, Massachusetts – December 26, 1982, in Palm Beach, Florida) was the first female lawyer in Pittsburgh, Pennsylvania, the first female senior partner of a law firm in Pennsylvania, and one of the first women to reach such a position in the USA.

== Early life ==
Graubart was born in Boston, Massachusetts as first of three children of a family of working-class immigrants from Hungary and Austria. Her father was a salesman who came to America when he was 15 to avoid the draft. Her mother placed great importance on formal education and languages. Atypically for this time, she supported her daughters in pursuing the education and careers they wished to pursue. Ella decided to go law school because of an uncle who was a lawyer in Budapest. Law, at the time, was seen as a profession unbefitting a woman. Ella Graubart was a straight A student and eventually graduated with honors from Hunter College in 1917. She fought for admittance as a student of law and was finally successful at the University of Pittsburgh. In 1927, she obtained her L.L.B. from the University of Pittsburgh and was admitted to the Pennsylvania bar in the same year.

== Professional life ==
In 1927, Graubart became the first female lawyer ever admitted to the Pennsylvania Bar Association, and went on to practice law until her retirement in 1965. She was known as an excellent legal counsel and became one of Pennsylvania's most highly paid and sought-after lawyers. She constantly supported women's rights, often representing women pro bono in cases related with fair salaries, minority rights and abortion. During the 1930s and 1940s, she was active in several committees, projects and actions headed by Eleanor Roosevelt and was invited to the White House on several occasions. Graubart became the first female senior named partner of a Pennsylvanian law firm with Patterson, Crawford, Arensberg and Dunn under her married name Arensberg. She was a life member of the American Law Institute, a member of Scribes and the author of numerous legal articles. Graubart held Civil Rights Movement rallies, provided funds for the Freedom Riders and was an ardent speaker when it came to women's rights. In 1945, she was the Pittsburgh director of the National Association of Women Lawyers.

== Family and Private Life ==
Graubart married Henry Richter, an electrical engineer who worked for Westinghouse and later on the World Trade Towers. They had one child, a daughter. Later Graubart was divorced from Richter and married Charles F.C. Arensberg, son of a steel baron and the founder of a respected Pittsburgh law firm, who was her professional mentor. Her brother was Captain Arthur H. Graubart nicknamed "The Beast of Berlin". Her sister Rita Graubart married John B. Gambling, host of the popular NYC radio show "Rambling With Gambling". Ella Graubart served as the first female president of the First Unitarian Church in Pittsburgh and was also president of the Pittsburgh Figure Skating Club. Graubart died on December 26, 1982, in Palm Beach, Florida, and was survived by her brother, her sister, her daughter and two grandchildren.
