= Helmuth Brinkmann =

German Admiral and Knight's Cross recipients

- Born: 12 March 1895; Lübeck
- Died: 26 September 1983 (aged 88); Dießen am Ammersee
- Military career
- Allegiance: German Empire; Weimar Republic; Nazi Germany
- Branch: Imperial German Navy; Reichsmarine; Kriegsmarine
- Service years: 1913–45
- Rank: Vizeadmiral
- Units: SMS Vineta; SMS Kaiser Friedrich III; SMS Kaiser Karl der Grosse; SMS Regensburg; Cruiser Königsberg
- Commands: Aviso Grille; Heavy cruiser Prinz Eugen
- Conflicts: World War I World War II
- Awards: Knight's Cross of the Iron Cross

Helmuth Brinkmann (12 March 1895 – 26 September 1983) was a Vizeadmiral in the Kriegsmarine during World War II who captained the heavy cruiser Prinz Eugen. Prior to World War II he commanded the aviso Grille, Adolf Hitler's state yacht. He was also a recipient of the Knight's Cross of the Iron Cross of Nazi Germany. Brinkmann surrendered to British troops in 1945 and was held until 1947.

== Operation Rheinübung ==
=== Goal ===
The goal of Operation Rheinübung (Rhine Exercise) was for Prinz Eugen and the battleship Bismarck, under the command of Brinkmann's Crew 1913 classmate Captain Ernst Lindemann, to break into the Atlantic and attack Allied shipping. Grand Admiral Erich Raeder's orders to the task force commander, Admiral Günther Lütjens, the Chief of Fleet aboard the Bismarck, were that "the objective of the Bismarck is not to defeat enemies of equal strength, but to tie them down in a delaying action, while preserving combat capacity as much as possible, so as to allow Prinz Eugen to get at the merchant ships in the convoy" and "The primary target in this operation is the enemy's merchant shipping; enemy warships will be engaged only when that objective makes it necessary and it can be done without excessive risk."

=== Events ===
At 02:00 on 19 May 1941, Bismarck and Prinz Eugen left Gotenhafen and proceeded through the Baltic Sea and out towards the Atlantic. Unknown to Lütjens, the British had intercepted enough signals to infer that a German naval operation might occur in the area. The German task force was first encountered by the Swedish seaplane-cruiser Gotland on 20 May heading north-west, past Gothenburg. The British Admiralty was informed through a Norwegian officer in Stockholm who had learned of the sighting from a Swedish military intelligence source. Alerted by this report, British Admiralty requested air reconnaissance of the Norwegian coast. A Spitfire reconnaissance aircraft found and photographed the German task force in the Grimstad fjord (60°19.49′N 5°14.48′E), near Bergen, at 13:15 on 21 May. On the evening of 23 May at 19:22, the German force was detected by the heavy cruisers HMS Suffolk and HMS Norfolk that had been patrolling the Denmark Strait in the expectation of a German breakout. Bismarck fired five salvos without scoring a direct hit. The heavily outgunned British cruisers retired to a safe distance and shadowed the enemy until their own heavy units could draw closer. However, Bismarck's forward radar had failed as a result of vibration from the heavy guns firing during this skirmish, and Lütjens was obliged to order Prinz Eugen to move ahead of Bismarck in order to provide the squadron with forward radar coverage.

==== Battle ====
The hydrophones on Prinz Eugen detected a foreign ship to port at 05:00. The Germans sighted the smokestacks of two ships at 05:45. The British ships started firing at the German task force at 05:53. Vice-Admiral Lancelot Holland planned on targeting Bismarck first, but due to the reversed battle order, HMS Prince of Wales and HMS Hood opened fire on the Prinz Eugen instead. The commander of the Prince of Wales, Captain John Leach, detected this error and ordered his guns swung around to fire on Bismarck. The German task force was still waiting for the order to commence firing, which Admiral Lütjens did not give immediately. Two minutes into the battle Bismarck and Prinz Eugen started firing at Hood. At 05:57 Hood was hit by Prinz Eugen, igniting reserve ammunition stored on deck, and starting a fire. The fifth salvo by Bismarck, fired at a range of about 180 hectometres (18,000 m; 20,000 yd) at 06:01, was seen to hit Hood abreast her mainmast. It is likely that one 38-centimetre (15 in) shell struck somewhere between Hood's mainmast and 'X' turret aft of the mast. A huge jet of flame burst out from Hood from the vicinity of the mainmast. This was followed by a devastating magazine explosion that destroyed the aft part of the ship. This explosion broke the back of Hood, and she sank in only three minutes, her nearly vertical bow last to descend into the water.

=== Afterwards ===
Following the explosion, Prince of Wales was targeted by both German ships and disengaged from combat after seven direct hits, four by Bismarck and three by Prinz Eugen, at about 06:09. In the afternoon of 24 May, Admiral Lütjens, ordered Prinz Eugen to break away from the battleship Bismarck and operate independently against the enemy's merchant shipping. Prinz Eugen and Bismarck separated at 18:14 that evening. Bismarck was sunk by the concentrated effort of the Royal Navy on 27 May 1941 while Prinz Eugen arrived safely at Brest, France on 1 June 1941.

== Awards ==
- Iron Cross (1914) 2nd Class (10 October 1915) & 1st Class (24 July 1920)
- Honour Cross of the World War 1914/1918 (15 October 1934)
- Commander of the Order of the Crown of Italy (Commendatore della Corona d'Italia) (8 October 1937)
- Clasp to the Iron Cross (1939) 2nd Class & 1st Class (9 June 1941)
- High Seas Fleet Badge (5 April 1942)
- Order of Michael the Brave 3rd Class (30 May 1944)
- German Cross in Gold on 25 March 1942 as Kapitän zur See on heavy cruiser Prinz Eugen
- Knight's Cross of the Iron Cross 17 May 1944 as Vizeadmiral and commander of the Black Seas Fleet
