= Arthur H. Graubart =

United States Navy Captain (1901-2003)

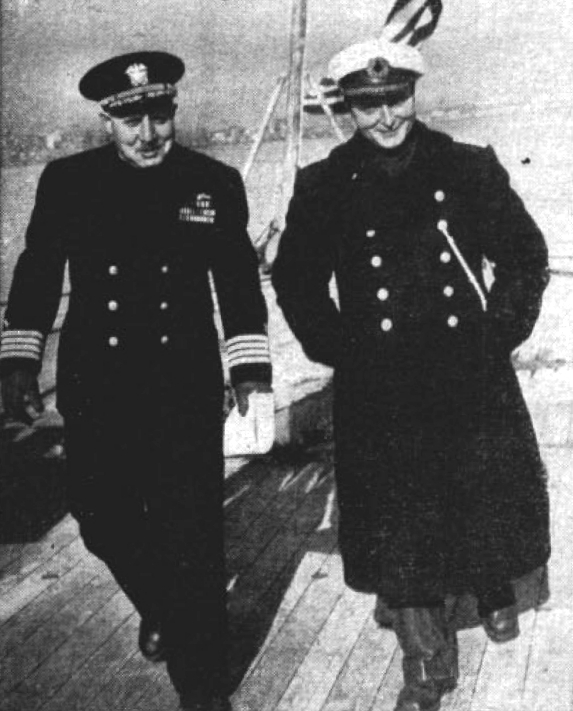
Graubart (left) and Captain Hansjürgen Reinicke (right), February 1946 off the Philadelphia Naval Shipyard.

Arthur Harrison "Speedy" Graubart (December 8, 1901 – August 12, 2003) was a United States Navy captain, and the last commander of the heavy cruiser Prinz Eugen after the ship's transfer as a war prize from Nazi Germany's Kriegsmarine to the US Navy.

== Youth ==
Graubart was born in Albany, New York, as the youngest of three children to Hungarian and Austrian immigrants. His father was a salesman who came to America when he was 15 to avoid the draft. At an early age, Arthur Graubart showed an aptitude for mathematics and science, while his sister Ella Graubart went on to become the first female lawyer in Pittsburgh.

He graduated from Charleston Harris High School in New York City in 1918. After the US declared war on Germany in 1917, Graubart tried to enlist in the United States Marine Corps at sixteen, but was recognized by an acquaintance of his father and sent home after two days. One day after his graduation from high school, he volunteered for service in the navy.

== Early naval career ==
Graubart entered the United States Naval Academy in 1921, ser. number 59309. As a midshipman, he earned the nickname “Speed” or "Speedy", when one of the members of the track team was injured and Graubart was asked to run in his place. Even though he crossed the finish line almost a half lap behind everyone else, he still earned a critical point for his team, so they nicknamed him “Speed” and it stuck with him.

After graduation in 1925, his first assignment was on board the light cruiser USS Cincinnati, which in 1927 was involved in the Nicaragua "Banana Fleet" operations to protect American refugees during the country's civil war. In 1927 Graubart reported to the Officers Submarine School at Naval Submarine Base New London. Upon completion, he was transferred to the submarine USS R-2, where he served until 1931. In 1932 Graubart was assigned to the submarine USS Barracuda for a three-year tour of duty. On November 24, 1938, he was transferred from Submarine Division 12 to Submarine Squadron 4, serving on the submarine USS Porpoise, where he served until 1939.

== Assistant naval attaché in Nazi Germany ==
Graubart, fluent in German due to his family background, was transferred to Germany in 1931, where he studied with famous professors Adolph Nägel and Richard Mollier at the Technische Hochschule in Dresden, which was then Germany's top technology institute in diesel engines. At the time of his death, Graubart was the oldest living alumnus.

On May 24, 1940, then Lieutenant Commander Graubart was appointed assistant naval attaché and became a very keen observer of German Naval tactics in the 1939-1941 period. Graubart was very well connected within the German Navy, and his dinners and Navy soirées became a meeting point of Anti-Nazi circles within the German Navy and of like-minded fellow students. He was in Berlin when Germany declared war on the United States. On December 11, 1941, he was arrested by the Gestapo and held at Bad Nauheim prison. Friends in the German Navy intervened on his behalf and sent him extra provisions of food and drink. In mid-1942 he returned home in an exchange of political prisoners.

== World War II ==
After his return from captivity, he was assigned commander of the submarine base in New Guinea, building this base up from scratch, supporting America's Pacific campaign at the heart of submarine warfare. He served in Submarine Divisions in Perth and Brisbane, Australia. His excellent organizational skills, expertise in submarine diesel engines and the speedy repairs on his watch confirmed once again his nickname "Speedy". In 1942, he was aboard USS Helm for testing new torpedoes.

In mid-1944, he received orders to report to the Pentagon and became a member of the working group preparing the comprehensive manual on the German Armed Forces, titled U.S. War Department Technical Manual TM-E 30-451: Handbook on German Military Forces, first issued to troops in loose-leaf format from February 1945 on and published on 15 March, 1945. In late 1944, Graubart, by now promoted to captain, was posted to London and entered Germany with advancing U.S. troops in December 1944. Before the unconditional surrender, he was first flown to Frankfurt, then to Berlin, as member of what was to become the Tripartite Naval Commission.

His CO, Vice Admiral Robert L. Ghormley, Commander, U.S. Naval Forces Germany since December 1944, sent Graubart as his representative to the official surrender of the German Navy at Field Marshal Bernard Montgomery's headquarters in Lüneburg, where Commander-in-Chief of the Kriegsmarine, General Admiral Hans-Georg von Friedeburg, signed an instrument of surrender of all German armed forces in the Netherlands, northwest Germany and Denmark on 4 May 1945. Graubart was also present when the German surrender was signed at General Dwight D. Eisenhower's headquarters in Rheims on May 7, 1945, and at Marshal Georgiy Zhukov's headquarters in Berlin Karlshorst on May 8. Nicknamed "the Beast of Berlin", he himself called his situation "not bad for a former POW of Hitler's Reich".

== Postwar career ==
Graubart, fluent in German as well as in Russian, stayed in Germany and was, for a time, the highest-ranking US Navy officer in Berlin. At a meeting with Soviet counterparts in the Reich Chancellery, he famously got the Russian guards drunk on vodka, and in the resulting alcohol fuelled disorientation, was able to make off with the large swastika banner that had been the backdrop of many of Hitler's speeches. The banner now hangs in the Naval Academy museum.

He attended the Potsdam Conference (17 July and 2 August 1945) and was assigned to the Tripartite Naval Commission on its foundation on August 15, 1945. TNC was responsible for the allocation of seized German ships to the commission's member nations US, UK and USSR. Graubart was subsequently appointed to TNC's Technical Sub-Committee which had responsibility for preparing the allocation lists and was a member of several Inspection Parties (also called Tripartite Naval Boards) to undertake the detailed work in estimating the seaworthiness and value of ships and in deciding which ships and submarines would be allocated between the three Allies, and the disposal arrangements for the remainder .

Graubart travelled extensively in Germany, Poland, the USSR and grew very suspicious of Soviet intentions. On several occasions, he argued for not discharging German Navy units under US and UK control, but to keep them in order to have more Naval capacity ready against possible Soviet actions. His views were very unpopular at the time, Stalin and the Soviet Union were still seen as unconditional friends of the US. His Soviet counterparts had no illusions concerning his sympathies and, on several occasions asked for his dismissal from the commission, but to no avail. Graubart was successful in securing some of the best remaining German ships for the US, including the heavy cruiser Prinz Eugen and the barque USCGC Eagle, back then known as SS Horst Wessel, and, with his CO's knowledge quietly kept as many ships seaworthy and manned as possible. Knowing that TNC would come to an end in 1946, he actively lobbied for being appointed commander of Prinz Eugen and was confirmed in December 1945.

== Captain of the Prinz Eugen ==
In the distribution of the few remaining German naval vessels after the Potsdam conference, the heavy cruiser Prinz Eugen, which had been in company with the Bismarck when she sank the Hood, and had herself landed three hits with her 8-inch shells on the Prince of Wales in that action—was assigned to the US Navy. On January 5, 1946, Prinz Eugen was put "in service" of the U.S. Navy, designated USS IX 300/ USS Prinz Eugen in Bremerhaven. Captain A. H. Graubart became the ship's new commander and along with him 8 US officers and 80 seamen of different specialties boarded the ship. With a crew of 574 German officers and crewmen under Hansjürgen Reinicke, Graubart departed Bremerhaven on January 13, and headed for Boston, en route stopping for a few hours in the Spitehead's Road. Prinz Eugen called at her destination harbor on January 23. The ship became an instant sensation after her arrival, the fact, that Graubart got along well with "his" German crew and had dinner with them after the ship's arrival was criticized.

Newspaper articles of onboard drunkenness and orgies started to circulate in the media. Graubart refuted all reproaches of fraternization but called his action another example of proper US Navy seamanship - "a captain is never too good to eat with his crew, having crossed the Atlantic Ocean with them". A subsequent Admiralty enquiry resulted in the investigators concluding: "Absolutely no evidence of drunkenness, either among visitors or within the crew, whose behaviour was at all times correct." At the beginning of February 1946, Graubart received order to perform a number of gunnery tests. In the beginning of March, a part of the German crew (276 men) was sent back to Germany.

On March 11, USS Prinz Eugen sailed for San Pedro Naval Base on the Pacific coast of the United States, via the Panama Canal. The ship was assigned her own field post office designation as U.S.S. "PRINZ EUGEN" . (IX/300), c/o Fleet Post Office, San Francisco-Calif. Against Graubart's recommendation, the final group of German seamen (153 men) including Captain Reinicke left the ship on May 1 and an American crew of 526 seamen took over. A few days later she departed for Honolulu, arriving there on May 10. The American crew, not used to German machinery, was not successful in operating the ship's boilers, thus effectively ending Graubart's command. The Prinz Eugen had to be towed to the Bikini Atoll to be used as a target ship in Operation Crossroads, the Bikini Atoll atomic tests conducted against ships in 1946. The two last Captains of Prinz Eugen remained friends until Reinicke's death in 1978; Graubart spoke at the funeral.

== Head of Naval Intelligence in Germany ==
After debriefing in regard of his activities with Tripartite Naval Commission, his command of Prinz Eugen and his estimate of Soviet intentions and German capabilities, Graubart was appointed Chief of U.S. Naval Intelligence in Berlin. In 1949, he and his assistant LCDR Edwin Riedel, USN began contacting former German Navy officers to ask for their co-operation in the so-called Naval Historical Team, a project of naval intelligence. Initially, the employees, all former German Navy personnel handpicked by Graubart, who, from his pre-war attaché times, knew too well who was a Nazi and who not, wrote historical studies. Soon, the team's mission was changed to planning for the formation of a new German Navy and to study contemporary military matters like Soviet Navy build-up and submarine warfare.

In November 1950, a few months after the outbreak of the Korean war, the U.S. Navy, acting through COMNAVGER, formed three labor service units "to assist in manning the ships, craft and shore facilities of US Naval Forces Germany". Graubart and his team was tasked with identifying and recruiting the appropriate personnel. The three units were civilian in name only and were uniformed, housed, fed and trained like U.S. Navy personnel, thus forming the very nucleus of the future Navy of Western Germany (Bundesmarine).

== USS Taconic ==
In 1951, Graubart returned to the U.S. to take command of the amphibious force flagship USS Taconic (AGC-17) and stayed in that command until 1952.

== CIA ==
The following year he returned to Germany attached to the CIA in Bonn and Frankfurt. His final post, also in intelligence, was at the Third Naval District in New York.

== Post-retirement career and family ==
Graubart retired from the Navy in 1955 and returned to Germany as an engineering consultant. He later founded his own consulting firm in Germany, consulting on military and navy hardware. Very successful in postwar Germany, he was convinced, that peace and stability in Europe depended very much on a peaceful and prosperous Germany. His annual donations enabled the U. S. Naval Academy Alumni Association to fund German language study programs for selected volunteer midshipmen and USNA graduates on active duty.

He was married to Lucile Cheever Graubart (1901–1995) at the Naval Academy Chapel on September 13, 1931, the couple remained married until her death in 1995. Graubart retired again in 1968 and settled down in Palm Beach, Florida, when not spending time in Germany during summers. On October 20, 1969, he became deputy of the Palm Beach Civil Defense Council and held this position until August 14, 1984. He was a life member of the United States Submarine Veterans, Snug Harbor Base/ Miocco/Fl. chapter.

Graubart died on August 12, 2003, in Palm Beach, Florida. He is buried at the United States Naval Academy Cemetery Annapolis, Anne Arundel County, Maryland, United States.

== Awards and decorations ==
- Legion of Merit, gazetted in "All Hands", May 1947, p.44
- Bronze Star Medal
- Navy Commendation Medal
- European-African-Middle Eastern Campaign Medal
- Asiatic-Pacific Campaign Medal
- World War II Victory Medal
- American Defense Service Medal
- Navy Occupation Service Medal with "Germany" clasp
- Submarine Warfare Insignia
- Surface Warfare Insignia
- Honorary Flottenkriegsabzeichen (High Seas Fleet Badge) awarded by CO of Prinz Eugen
- German Navy Officer's Sword with engraved dedication, gift of the crew of Prinz Eugen

== Dates of rank ==
Commander: 15 December 1942
