= Task Force Thiele =

II. Kampfgruppe (Second Task Force) Kampfgruppe Thiele (Task Force Thiele)
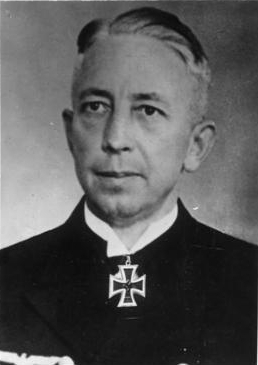
- Task force commander Thiele
- Active: 28 July 1944 – 27 April 1945
- Country: Nazi Germany
- Branch: Kriegsmarine

Commanders
- Officer Commanding: Vizeadmiral August Thiele

Task Force Thiele (German: Kampfgruppe Thiele) was an organizational unit of the German Kriegsmarine during World War II. It was named after its commander Vizeadmiral August Thiele who led the task force from 23 March 1945 until it was disbanded on 27 April 1945. It was formed from the Second Task Force (II. Kampfgruppe) which had been created on 28 July 1944 from the Baltic Sea Training Unit, also under command of Thiele. Prinz Eugen served as the flagship of Task Force Thiele.

== Operational history ==
Thiele on-board of Prinz Eugen led the task force on 19 August 1944 in support of the German forces in Courland. Prinz Eugen steamed into the Gulf of Riga and bombarded Tukums from a distance of 25,000 metres (27,000 yd). Prinz Eugen fired a total of 265 rounds from its 20.3 cm (8.0 in) SK L/60 guns. In parallel, the destroyers Z25, Z28, Z35 and Z36 and the torpedo boats T23 and T28 attacked further targets.

The Soviet advance in the Baltic continued. The last German convoy left Reval on 23 September. On 29 September Soviet forces landed on Moon, on 2 October on Dagö, and on 5 October on Ösel, where the German troops were cut off on the Sworbe peninsula. Memel was about to fall to the Soviets. Thiele's task force, which included Prinz Eugen, Lützow, four destroyers and four torpedo boats, left Gotenhafen on 10 October to support the defensive land battles. In the timeframe 10–12 and 14–15 October Prinz Eugen bombarded 28 different targets and expended 1,196 20.3 cm rounds.

== Order of battle ==
Major warships assigned to Task Force Thiele included:

- Lützow, a Deutschland-class heavy cruiser
- Admiral Scheer, a Deutschland-class heavy cruiser
- Prinz Eugen, an Admiral Hipper class heavy cruiser

== Taks Force Command ==
Vizeadmiral August Thiele, 28 July 1944 – 27 April 1945
Vizeadmiral Bernhard Rogge, 10–22 March 1945 (in deputize)

- 1. Admiralstabsoffizier / Chief of Staff
  - Korvettenkapitän Kurt Reitsch, August 1944 – 27 April 1945
- 2. Admiralstabsoffizier
  - Korvettenkapitän Wolfgang Freiherr von Steinaecker, February 1945 – 27 April 1945
- 3. Admiralstabsoffizier
  - Vacant
- 4. Admiralstabsoffizier
  - Korvettenkapitän Helmut Michaelis, November 1944 – 27 April 1945
- Task Force Engineer
  - Korvettenkapitän (Ing.) Kurt Ziegler, September 1944 – 27 April 1945
- Task Force Court
  - Geschwaderrichter Dr.jur. Walter Meese, 28 Jul 1944 – January 1945 (tasked with the obligations)
  - Marineoberstabsrichter Dr.jur. Axel Hawranke, January 1945 – 27 April 1945
