= Naval Front Clasp =

Naval Front Clasp Marine-Frontspange
- design by Wilhelm Ernst Peekhaus
- Type: Badge
- Presented by: Nazi Germany
- Eligibility: Military personnel
- Campaign: World War II
- Status: Obsolete
- Established: 19 November 1944

The Naval Front Clasp (German: Marine-Frontspange) was a World War II German military decoration awarded to officers and men of the Kriegsmarine in recognition of long, front line service for all naval units, except the submarine service, which had their own clasp to award. This bronze clasp was awarded for service or valor above that of the basic war badge. The award was instituted on 19 November 1944 by Grand Admiral Karl Dönitz.
