= J3 battlecruiser =

1921 British naval design study

Class overview
- Name: J3
- Operators: Royal Navy
- Preceded by: Admiral class
- Succeeded by: G3 class
- Planned: 5
- Canceled: 5

General characteristics
- Type: Battlecruiser
- Displacement: about 43,100 long tons (43,800 t)
- Length: 860 ft (262.1 m)
- Beam: 106 ft (32.3 m)
- Draught: 32 ft (9.8 m) (at deep load)
- Installed power: 151,000 shp (113,000 kW)
- Propulsion: 4 shafts, 4 geared steam turbine sets
- Speed: 33 knots (61 km/h; 38 mph)
- Armament: 3 × triple 15-inch (381 mm) guns; 6 × twin 6-inch (152 mm) guns; 6 × single 4.7-inch (120 mm) AA guns; 4 × quadruple-barrel 2-pdr "pom-pom" mountings; 4 × 21-inch (533 mm) torpedo tubes
- Armour: Belt: 13 in (330 mm); Deck: 6 in (152 mm); Barbettes: 13 in (330 mm); Turrets: 8–15 in (203–381 mm); Conning tower: 13 in (330 mm); Bulkheads: 9–14 in (229–356 mm)

The J3 class battlecruiser was a design study conducted during the Royal Navy's 1921 Fleet modernization programme. As a follow-on to the Admiral-class battlecruiser, the J3 class incorporated all the lessons learned from the First World War, specifically the battle of Jutland. The design was seen as an improvement to the Admiral class by virtue of its heavier and improved armouring scheme, specifically the deck armour, although the offensive armament remained roughly the same. The design was superseded by the I3 and G3 battlecruiser designs, as both mounted a heavier main armament, and further improved the protection scheme, on roughly the same tonnage. The 1921 fleet program was cancelled due to signing of the Washington Naval Treaty in 1922, which limited the size and armament of battleships to 35,000 long tons (36,000 t) and no gun bigger than 16 inches (406 mm).

== Background ==
In 1916 the US had declared its intention to create a Navy "second to none"; Congress had authorized the building of a large number of battleships and battlecruisers. In response, the Japanese government also began a large programme of warship building (the 8-8 fleet). Two improved Revenge-class battleship hulls were rebuilt into the two Renown-class battlecruisers by the Royal Navy during the war. The only new capital ships laid down during the war were the Admiral-class battlecruisers. Their design had been called into question after the Battle of Jutland in 1916, and three ships of this class were cancelled, leaving only Hood to be completed to a modified design.

The US plan had been delayed by the wartime need to build smaller vessels. Nevertheless, estimates by the Admiralty were that by the early 1920s the Royal Navy would be behind in ships. By the beginning of 1920 the Americans had completed one battleship since the end of World War I and had five more building. Seven more were intended to be laid down in 1920–21, six of which were the very large and powerful South Dakota class, armed with twelve 16-inch guns. The Japanese had finished one battleship since the end of the war and had three more under construction. To respond to this state of affairs, the Admiralty initially planned to build three battleships and one battlecruiser in the fiscal year 1921–22 and again in 1922–23, but this was changed to four battlecruisers to be built first, presumably to be followed by the same number of battleships the following year.

The British did have access to German technology through ships such as the battleship Baden which had been saved from the scuttling of the interned German High Seas Fleet in Scapa Flow and the experiences of the war. A committee concluded that any new ship should be able to match the speed of the new US Lexington-class battlecruisers, expected to make 32 knots. Consequently, a series of designs was prepared of ships with displacements ranging from 53,100 to 44,500 long tons (54,000 to 45,200 t), the only limitations being the ability to use British dockyards and passage through the Suez Canal. These designs were given letters of the alphabet running backwards from K to G. The related battleship designs under consideration at the same time had design letters from L upwards.

The first two design proposals, 'K2' and 'K3', had a general layout similar to Hood, but were armed with either eight or nine 18-inch guns, in four twin or three triple gun turrets, respectively. The numeral in the designation came from the number of guns in each turret. These ships were very large, displacing 52,000 to 53,100 long tons (52,800 to 54,000 t), could only reach 30 knots (56 km/h; 35 mph), and could only be docked in a single ex-German floating dock, and one dock, Gladstone Dock in Liverpool. The 'J3', the next proposal, saved nearly 10,000 long tons (10,000 t) by reducing the main armament to nine 50-calibres long 15-inch (381 mm) guns and the main deck armour to 4 inches (102 mm). Total armour was less than Hood but with increased power was expected to reach 32 kn. This reduction in size allowed the ship to dock anywhere that Hood could, and to pass through the Suez and Panama Canals.

The configuration was considered poorly armoured and a more compact design I3 - with machinery aft, magazines centrally disposed and the main armament forward - was drawn up by the DNC and presented in late 1920. A variation of I3, the G3 design, with reduced gun calibre and thinner armour over machinery, was tendered as a means to reduce weight and hence increase speed.

== General characteristics ==
The J3 battlecruisers were of very similar size to the Admiral class. They had an overall length of 860 feet (262.1 m), a beam of 104 feet (31.7 m), and a draught of 32 feet (9.8 m) at deep load. They would have displaced 43,100 long tons (43,800 t) normally and 48,000 long tons (49,000 t) at deep load, over 2,500 long tons (2,500 t) more than the older ships. The main benefit of the design was a reduction in the weight of the main armament but increase in firepower by converting from twin to triple mount turrets, with the additional weight savings being used to improve protection and armouring.

=== Propulsion ===
The J3 battlecruiser design had four geared steam turbine sets, each driving one propeller shaft, and arranged in two engine rooms. The forward engine room held the two turbines for the wing shafts, while the aft engine room contained the turbine for the port and starboard inner shafts. The turbines were powered by 18 Yarrow small-tube boilers divided between nine boiler rooms. They were designed to produce a total of 151,000 shaft horsepower (113,000 kW) at a working pressure of 200 psi (1,379 kPa) and temperature of 200 °C (392 °F) with superheat. Maximum speed would have been 34 knots (63 km/h; 39 mph).

=== Armament ===
Housing the main armament in triple turrets was new to the Royal Navy, though British companies had been involved in the production of triple gun turret designs for other navies. The choice of a high muzzle velocity with a lighter shell was taken from the German practice; it ran counter to previous British guns such as the BL 15-inch Mark I gun which were lower-muzzle-velocity weapons firing heavy shells.

The J3 design mounted nine 15-inch 50-calibre guns in three triple hydraulically powered Mark I gun turrets, designated 'A', 'B', and 'Z' from front to rear. The guns could be depressed to −3° and elevated to 40°. The ships' maximum stowage was 116 shells per gun. They fired 2,048-pound (929 kg) projectiles at a muzzle velocity of 2,670 ft/s (810 m/s). Their maximum range was about 38,000 yards (35,000 m) at maximum elevation. These weapons would have been very similar in construction to the BL 16-inch Mark I produced for the Nelson- class battleships The J3s carried a secondary armament of 12 BL 6-inch Mark XXII guns in twin turrets amidships behind the main bridge structure and ahead of the Z turret. The guns could elevate between –5° and +60°.

An anti-aircraft battery of six QF 4.7-inch guns was included. On the HA Mark XII mount used from 1926 the Mark VIII gun had a maximum depression of -5° and a maximum elevation of 90°. They fired a 50-pound (23 kg) high explosive shell at a rate of eight to twelve rounds per minute up to a maximum ceiling of 32,000 ft (9,800 m), and effective range out to 16,160 yards (14,780 m). A maximum of 256 rounds per gun could be carried. The ships were intended to carry four eight-barreled mountings for the 40-millimetre (1.6 in) QF 2-pounder gun (commonly known as a "pom-pom"), two abaft the funnels and two at the stern. Each gun would be provided with 1,300 rounds of ammunition.

=== Fire-control ===
The main guns of the J3 battlecruisers could be controlled from any of the three director-control towers (DCT). The primary DCT was mounted at the top of the forward superstructure. Another was mounted on the roof of the conning tower in an armoured hood, and the third was aft. Each main gun turret was provided with a 41-foot (12.5 m) coincidence rangefinder in an armoured housing on the turret roof. The secondary armament was primarily controlled by three DCTs. Two mounted on each side of the bridge and the third was located aft of the secondary armament. The anti-aircraft guns were controlled by a high-angle control system mounted on the very top of the forward superstructure. Each "pom-pom" mount had its own director and there was also a height-finder aft. Two 15-foot (4.6 m) torpedo rangefinders were located on the sides of the funnels.

=== Armour ===
The J3 was armoured similarly to the Hood, with bands of varying thickness. The armour was angled to up to 25 degrees on the belt, to increase relative thickness. One of the considerations that led to the cancellation of the J3 design was that the protection scheme did not use an "all or nothing" layout as later designs, such as the G3; this led to the J3 wasting tonnage on armour that would not have withstood incoming fire, a situation that the Admiralty found unacceptable.
