= HMS Incomparable =

Proposed British battlecruiser

- Artist's Impression - Incomparable behind, with Dreadnought foreground

Class overview
- Name: Incomparable
- Operators: Royal Navy
- Preceded by: Courageous class
- Succeeded by: Admiral class

General characteristics
- Displacement: 46,000 long tons (46,738 t) standard
- Length: 1,000 ft (304.8 m)
- Beam: 104 ft (31.7 m)
- Draught: 24 ft (7.3 m) (at deep load)
- Installed power: 180,000 shp (134,226 kW)
- Propulsion: Brown-Curtis geared steam turbines, Yarrow boilers
- Speed: 35 knots (65 km/h; 40 mph)
- Range: 24,000 nautical miles (44,000 km; 28,000 mi) at 10 knots (19 km/h; 12 mph)
- Armament: 3 × 2 – BL 20-inch (508 mm) guns; 5 × 3 – QF 4-inch (102 mm) guns; 9 × 1 – QF 3-pounder guns; 8 × 1 – 18-inch (460 mm) torpedo tubes
- Armour: Belt: 11 in (279 mm); Decks: 4 in (102 mm); Barbettes: 14 in (356 mm)

HMS Incomparable was the name given by Admiral John "Jackie" Fisher to a proposal for a very large battlecruiser which was suggested in 1915. The design was intended to mount 20-inch guns, which would have been the largest ever mounted on a warship. Despite research into the concept, it never entered the design stage or came close to being built.

== History ==
Fisher had long been an advocate of improving technology to maintain Britain's naval superiority. At the beginning of the 20th century, he had masterminded the introduction of the dreadnought type of battleship and its faster cousin, the battlecruiser. At the start of World War I, Fisher returned to the office of First Sea Lord. Here he oversaw the development of vessels which took the battlecruiser concept to its logical extreme.

Favouring an amphibious assault on the Pomeranian coast of Germany, three "large light cruisers" were built. These ships (Courageous-class battlecruisers) were designed to have a relatively shallow draft, but while they mounted large guns, they would have carried less armour than contemporary battlecruisers. The last of these, HMS Furious, was intended to carry only two 18-inch guns, one forward and one aft, far larger and more powerful than the 15-inch weapons that were standard on the Queen Elizabeth and Revenge-class battleships, and the two Renown-class battlecruisers; at the same time her deck and belt armour was at best only 3 inches thick, not really capable of standing up to the guns of even a light cruiser.

== Design ==
Incomparable was suggested as the logical conclusion of this trend. By the standards of her time, she would have been a mammoth vessel. Her intended displacement of 48,000 tons dwarfed the newly built Revenge-class battleships (28,000 tons).

This large hull was intended to accommodate engines capable of immense speed and sufficient fuel to give a prodigious range, coupled with armament and ammunition greater than anything before sent to sea. The 20-inch guns which were planned for Incomparable were bigger than the largest guns ever installed on a warship (the 18.1-inch guns of Yamato): 20-inch guns were ultimately only ever to be used on paper. The 18 inch gun tested on Furious was used on monitors during the war, from which complaints were occasionally voiced that it 'caused a shower of sheared off rivet heads' whenever fired. Just as remarkable as the firepower intended was the speed of the ship: if Incomparable had been capable of the 35 knots intended, she would have been faster than almost any battleship or battlecruiser built historically, and indeed faster than many cruisers or destroyers.

She was expected to have a life span of no more than 10 years; Fisher expected her design to be quickly surpassed.

As a warship, Incomparable would have been of dubious tactical value. Her construction would have been a very great expense, and her armour relatively weak. Despite the tremendous size of the main guns, there would be only six of them (fitted in two superfiring twin turrets forward and one aft) which was considered the bare minimum number of guns for long-range salvo firing. The Royal Navy's experience at the Battle of Jutland in 1916, where three of Fisher's battlecruisers were destroyed, resulted in a decisive turn away from the 'large light cruiser' concept and towards the 'fast battleship'. The subsequent design of battlecruiser, the Admiral class, ended up incorporating much heavier armour but retained the proven 15-inch guns. Only one, HMS Hood, was completed, with the rest scrapped in 1919. The following class intended (but also never built), based on the G3 design, was a battlecruiser only in relation to the paired N3 battleship.

== See also ==
- Moffett Battlecruiser Design
- KW45/50 battlecruiser
