= Admiral class =

The term Admiral class can refer to two classes of warship:

- Admiral-class battleship, six pre-dreadnought battleships built for the Royal Navy during the late 1800s
- Admiral-class battlecruiser, of which four were planned for the Royal Navy near the end of World War I but only one completed
