= Incomparable =

Incomparable may refer to:

- Comparability, in mathematics, with respect to a given relation over a set
- HMS Incomparable, a proposal for a very large battlecruiser, suggested in 1915
- Incomparable (diamond), one of the largest diamonds ever found
- Anupama (1966 film) a.k.a. "Incomparable"
- Incomparable (Faith Evans album), a 2014 album
- Incomparable (Dead by April album), a 2011 album
- "Incomparable", a song by Jay Chou from the 2007 album On the Run!

== See also ==
- Comparable (disambiguation)
- Incomparability property (commutative algebra)
- Indistinguishability (disambiguation)
