= N3-class battleship =

Class of British dreadnought battleships

Class overview
- Name: N3
- Operators: Royal Navy
- Preceded by: Revenge class
- Succeeded by: Nelson class
- Planned: 4
- Canceled: 4

General characteristics
- Type: Battleship
- Displacement: about 48,500 long tons (49,300 t)
- Length: 820 ft (249.9 m)
- Beam: 106 ft (32.3 m)
- Draught: 33 ft (10.1 m) (at deep load)
- Installed power: 20 Yarrow boilers; 56,000 shp (42,000 kW)
- Propulsion: 2 shafts; 2 geared steam turbine sets
- Speed: 23 knots (43 km/h; 26 mph)
- Armament: 3 × triple 18 in (457 mm) guns; 8 × twin 6 in (152 mm) guns; 6 × single 4.7 in (120 mm) AA guns; 4 × 10-barrel 2-pdr (40 mm (1.6 in)) AA guns; 2 × 24.5 in (622 mm) torpedo tubes
- Armour: Belt: 13.5–15 in (343–381 mm); Deck: 6–8 in (152–203 mm); Barbettes: 15 in (381 mm); Turrets: 10–18 in (254–457 mm); Conning tower: 15 in (381 mm); Bulkheads: 9–14 in (229–356 mm)

The N3 class was a battleship class designed for the Royal Navy after World War I, incorporating lessons learned from that conflict. They were similar in design to the G3-class battlecruiser, but had larger guns and thicker armour. They were never ordered due to signing of the Washington Naval Treaty in 1922, which limited the size and armament of battleships to 35,000 long tons (36,000 t) and guns no bigger than 16 inches (406 mm).

== Background ==
In 1916 the US had declared its intention to create a Navy "second to none"; Congress had authorized the building of a large number of battleships and battlecruisers. In response, the Japanese government also began a large programme of warship building (the 8-8 fleet). Two improved Revenge-class hulls were rebuilt into the two Renown-class battlecruisers by the Royal Navy during the war. The only new capital ships laid down during the war were the Admiral-class battlecruisers. Their design had been called into question after the Battle of Jutland in 1916 and three ships of this class were cancelled, leaving only HMS Hood to be completed to a modified design.

The US plan had been delayed by the wartime need to build smaller vessels. Nevertheless, estimates by the Admiralty were that by the early 1920s the Royal Navy would be behind in ships. By the beginning of 1920, the Americans had completed one battleship since the end of World War I and had five more building. Seven more were intended to be laid down in 1920–21, six of these were the very large and powerful South Dakota class, armed with twelve 16-inch guns. The Japanese had finished one battleship since the end of the war and had three more under construction. To correct this state of affairs, the Admiralty initially planned to build three battleships and one battlecruiser in Fiscal Year (FY) 1921–22 and again in FY 1922–23, but this was changed to four G3-class battlecruisers to be built first, presumably to be followed by the same number of battleships the following year.

A pair of designs were prepared in June 1920, derived from the "U-4" battleship design of 1914, of ships with displacements of about 50,000 long tons (51,000 t) and armed with eight or nine guns, in four twin or three triple gun turrets mounting a new 18-inch (457 mm) gun then under development. The only limitation of the design was the inability to use British dockyards and pass through the Suez Canal. The most unusual feature of these designs was that none of the turrets were superfiring, presumably to keep the centre of gravity as low as possible and avoid the extra weight required for tall, superfiring barbettes.

The designs were revised in October and split into separate battleship and battlecruiser designs. The battleship designs were given letters of the alphabet from L through N, with the use of triple or double gun turrets shown by 3 or 2 respectively. Both 'L2' and 'L3' had superfiring guns and the armour was reduced to a 15-inch (381 mm) inclined waterline belt while the main armoured deck was 8 inches (203 mm) thick (9 inches (229 mm) where it sloped to meet the belt). They both had a designed speed of 25 knots (46 km/h; 29 mph) and had transom sterns. 'L2' displaced 52,100 long tons (52,900 t), but 'L3' was a thousand tons lighter. 'M2' and 'M3' followed in November and December and were very different from the earlier designs.

'M2' and 'M3' sacrificed fire directly astern by moving the rear turret(s) amidships in order to save weight by shortening the length of the armoured citadel. Compared to the earlier, more conventional, designs, 'M2' saved 1,540 long tons (1,560 t) and 'M3' 1,740 long tons (1,770 t). More weight was saved by reducing the designed speed to 23–23.5 knots (42.6–43.5 km/h; 26.5–27.0 mph) and using only two propeller shafts, although it was thought that this would improve manoeuvering power over four smaller propellers. These changes saved 4,350 long tons (4,420 t) for 'M2' and 5,000 long tons (5,100 t) for 'M3' over their predecessors. A lengthened version of 'M3' was chosen for further development as N3 and approved in November 1921.

== Description ==
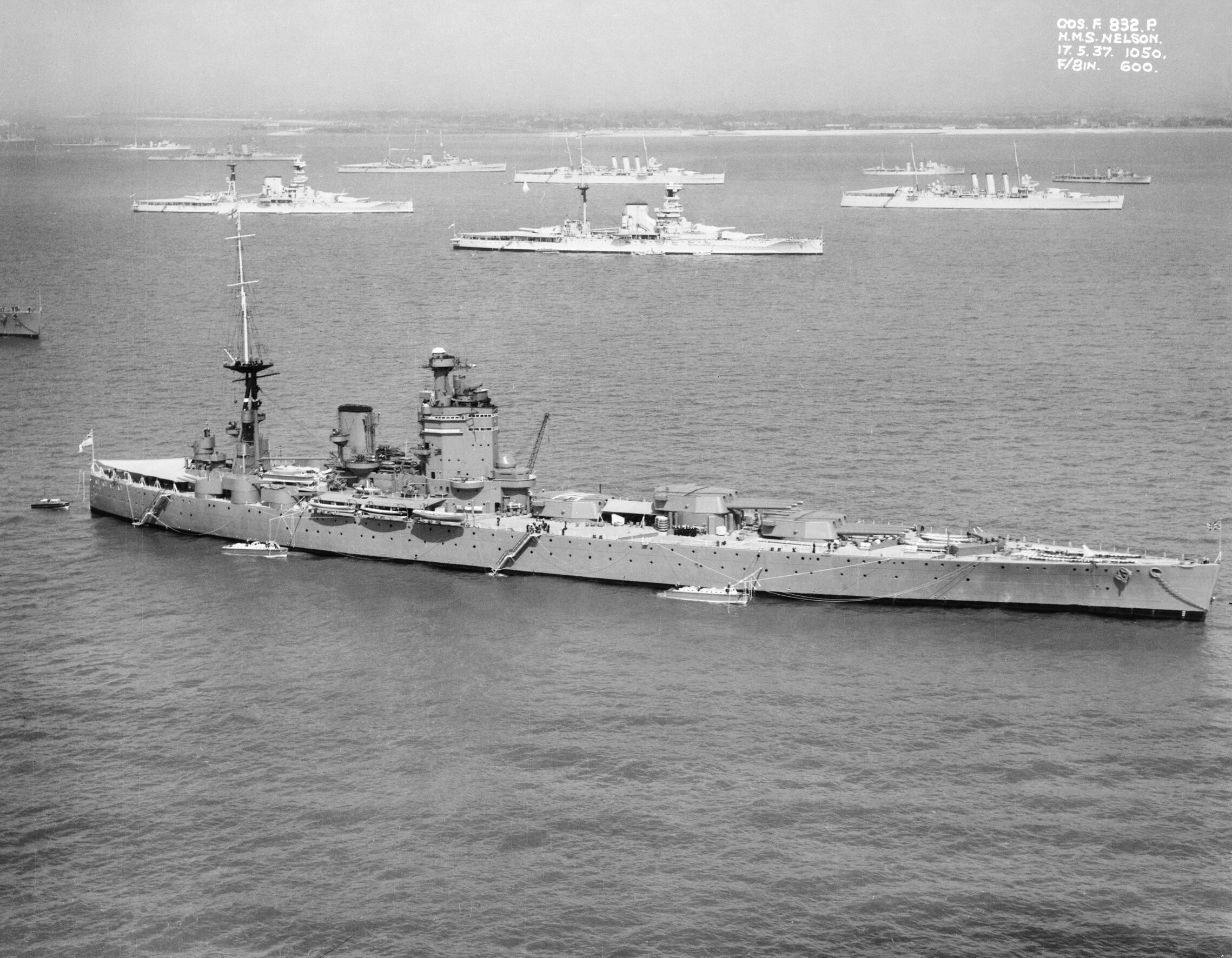
Many of the aspects of the N3 design were incorporated into HMS Nelson, shown here.

Most noticeable of the N3 design was the concentration of the main battery forward of the bridge and machinery spaces. A related feature of the design was the tower bridge structure behind the first two gun turrets. This provided a better and more stable foundation for fire-control equipment, greatly improved accommodation and protection from the weather.

The N3 battleships were significantly larger than their predecessors of the Revenge class. They had an overall length of 820 feet (249.9 m), a beam of 106 feet (32.3 m), and a draught of 33 feet (10.1 m) at deep load. They would have displaced about 48,500 long tons (49,300 t), nearly double the displacement of the older ships. They had a complete double bottom 7 feet (2.1 m) deep.

The ships would have had two geared steam turbine sets, each of which drove one propeller shaft, in two engine rooms forward of the boiler rooms. This allowed the funnel to be placed further aft and increased the ability of the rear turret to fire to the rear. The turbines would have been powered by small-tube boilers intended to produce a total of 56,000 shaft horsepower (42,000 kW). The ships' maximum speed would have been about 23 knots.

Housing the main armament in triple turrets was new to the Royal Navy though British companies had been involved in the production of triple-gun turret designs for other navies. The choice of a high muzzle velocity with a relatively lighter shell was taken from the German practice; it ran counter to previous British guns such as the BL 15-inch Mark I gun of 42-calibre length which were lower-muzzle-velocity weapons firing heavy shells.

=== Armament ===
The N3 design mounted nine 45-calibre BL 18-inch guns in three triple-gun turrets, designated 'A', 'B', and 'X' from front to rear. The guns had a maximum elevation of 40°. As none of these guns were ever completed and test-fired, sources differ on their exact specifications. Naval historian John Campbell quotes the projectile weight as 2,916 pounds (1,323 kg) fired at a muzzle velocity of 2,650 ft/s (810 m/s), but Alan Raven and John Roberts cite a 2,837-pound (1,287 kg) shell fired at a muzzle velocity of 2,700 ft/s (820 m/s). The maximum penetration of those guns at zero obliquity would have been 36.82 inches (935.3 mm) of armor for a muzzle velocity of 2,700 ft/s, that is based upon the USN Empirical Formula for Armor Penetration, in theory that would have made those guns the most powerful naval weapons in the world, surpassing the penetration power of the 460 mm guns found on the Yamato-class battleships. The N3s carried a secondary armament of sixteen BL 6-inch Mk XXII guns in superfiring twin turrets. Four turrets were sited around the forward superstructure and four at the stern. The guns could elevate between –5° and +60°. They fired 100-pound (45 kg) projectiles at a muzzle velocity of 2,945 ft/s (898 m/s). Their maximum range was 25,800 yd (23,600 m) at 45° elevation. Their rate of fire was five rounds per minute.

An anti-aircraft battery of six QF 4.7-inch Mk VIII guns was included. They had a maximum depression of -5° and a maximum elevation of 90°. They fired a 50-pound (23 kg) high explosive shell at a muzzle velocity of 2,457 ft/s (749 m/s) at a rate of eight to twelve rounds per minute. The guns had a maximum ceiling of 32,000 ft (9,800 m), but an effective range of much less. The ships were intended to carry four 10-barreled mountings (Note: The mounts were at a very early stage of development at this time and the number of barrels was reduced to eight before they went into production.) for the 40-millimetre (1.6 in) QF 2-pounder gun (commonly known as a pom-pom), two abaft the funnels and two at the stern. Each barrel was provided with 1300 rounds of ammunition. The gun fired a 40-millimetre (1.6 in) .91-pound (0.41 kg) shell at a muzzle velocity of 1,920 ft/s (590 m/s) to a distance of 3,800 yards (3,500 m). The gun's rate of fire was approximately 96–98 rounds per minute.

Like previous classes of British battleships, a pair of submerged, broadside-firing torpedo tubes were planned for these ships. Their compartment was located just forward of the 'A' shell room on the platform deck. Six 24.5-inch (622 mm) torpedoes per tube were to be carried in peace-time, but this would increase to eight in wartime. These Mark I torpedoes had a warhead of 743 pounds (337 kg) of TNT and were powered by oxygen-enriched air. They had two speed settings which governed their range: either 15,000 yards (13,716 m) at 35 knots (65 km/h; 40 mph), or 20,000 yards (18,288 m) at 30 knots (56 km/h; 35 mph).

=== Fire-control ===
The main guns of the battleships could be controlled from either of the two director-control towers (DCT). The primary DCT was mounted at the top of the forward superstructure. Another was mounted on the roof of the conning tower in an armoured hood. Each main gun turret was provided with a 41-foot (12.5 m) coincidence rangefinder in an armoured housing on the turret roof. The secondary armament was primarily controlled by two DCTs mounted on each side of the bridge. The anti-aircraft guns were controlled by a high-angle control system mounted on the mizzenmast. Each pom-pom mount had its own director and there was also a height-finder aft. Two 15-foot (4.6 m) torpedo rangefinders were located on the sides of the funnels.

=== Armour ===
A first for any British dreadnought was the use of the all or nothing protection scheme in the N3s and G3s. Medium-thickness armour had proven to be useless in stopping heavy-calibre shells during World War I so the vital areas of the ship were protected by the thickest possible armour and the rest of the ship was left unarmoured. Use of this system was pioneered by contemporary U.S. Navy battleship designs starting with the Nevada class. This system of protection required that the armoured citadel have enough reserve buoyancy to keep the ship stable even if the rest of the hull was riddled by gunfire.

The waterline belt of the N3 had a maximum thickness of 15 inches (381 mm) thick with the top of the armour angled outward at 25°. This angle increased the armor's relative thickness to horizontal, close-range fire, albeit at the cost of reducing its relative height which increased the chance of plunging shellfire going over or under it. It ran some 463 feet (141.1 m), from 9 feet (2.7 m) forward of 'A' barbette to the rear of the after 6-inch magazine. For about 115 feet (35.1 m), it reduced to 13.5 inches (343 mm) over the engine and boiler rooms. The belt had a height of 14 feet 3 inches (4.3 m), of which 4 feet 6 inches (1.4 m) was below the designed waterline. The lower edge of the belt abreast the magazines was continued down another 3 feet (0.9 m) by a 4 inches (102 mm) thickness of high-tensile steel inclined at 36° to prevent a shell from reaching the magazines via a wave trough at high speed. The ends of the belt terminated in 14-inch (356 mm) transverse bulkheads. The 8-inch (203 mm) armoured deck matched the length of the waterline belt and sloped down to meet the upper edge of the belt. It extended forward over the torpedo compartment which had a separate transverse bulkhead protecting it that was 9 inches (229 mm) thick. The steering gear was protected by a deck and bulkhead 6 inches (152 mm) thick.

The turret faces were 18 inches (457 mm) thick while their sides were probably 14 inches (356 mm) in thickness, and the roof was 8 inches thick. The armour of the barbettes and the conning tower was 15 inches thick and the conning tower's communications tube to the upper deck was 8 inches thick. The fire-control director atop the conning tower was protected by an armoured hood 4 to 6 inches thick.

The anti-torpedo bulges of the N3 were internal to the hull and were intended to withstand the explosion of a 750-pound (340 kg) torpedo warhead. They consisted of an outer air space, an inner buoyancy space and the 2 inches (51 mm) thick torpedo bulkhead. The bulkhead was situated about 16 feet (4.9 m) inboard from the side of the ship. Postwar tests done on a replica of this system showed that filling the buoyancy space with water rather than the sealed steel crushing tubes as used in Hood was just as effective and weighed less.

== Cancellation ==
The four N3 battleships were never ordered because the Washington Naval Treaty, an arms limitation treaty under negotiation at the time, forbade construction of any ship larger than 35,000 tons. Many of the aspects of their design ultimately were incorporated into the two Nelson-class battleships, and they are often described as being a cut-down N3. Indeed, the Nelsons received the design designation 'O3', marking them as next in the design sequence, although they used the guns intended for the G3 battlecruisers for cost reasons and to comply with the Treaty's 16-inch limitation on main armament.
