= Indistinguishability =

Indistinguishability may refer to:

- Identical (indistinguishable) particles
- Computational indistinguishability
- Ciphertext indistinguishability
- Indistinguishability obfuscation
- Topological indistinguishability
- Indistinguishable processes

== See also ==
- Incomparable (disambiguation)
