= Comparable =

Comparable may refer to:

- Comparability, in mathematics
- Comparative, in grammar, a word that denotes the degree by which an entity has a property greater or less in extent than another

== See also ==
- Incomparable (disambiguation)
