= Nelson-class battleship =

Class of battleships of the British Royal Navy

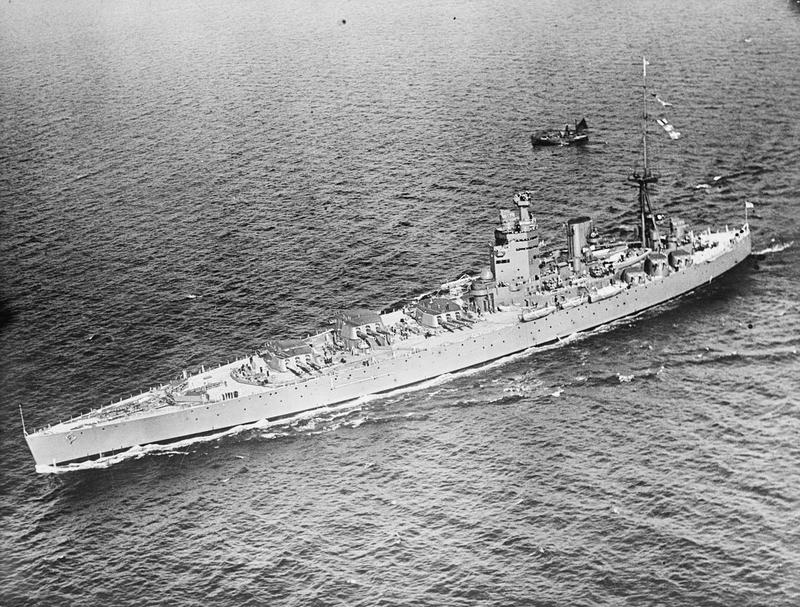
- Aerial view of Nelson before 1939

Class overview
- Name: Nelson class
- Builders: Armstrong Whitworth; Cammell Laird
- Operators: Royal Navy
- Preceded by: N3 class (planned); Revenge class (actual)
- Succeeded by: King George V class
- Cost: £7,504,055–7,617,799
- Built: 1922–1927
- In service: 1927–1947
- Completed: 2
- Scrapped: 2

General characteristics (Nelson as built)
- Type: Battleship
- Displacement: 33,300 long tons (33,800 t) (standard); 37,780 long tons (38,390 t) (full load)
- Length: 709 ft 10 in (216.4 m) o/a
- Beam: 106 ft (32.3 m)
- Draught: 30 ft 4 in (9.2 m) (mean standard)
- Installed power: 8 × Admiralty 3-drum boilers; 45,000 shp (34,000 kW)
- Propulsion: 2 shafts; 2 geared steam turbines
- Speed: 23 knots (43 km/h; 26 mph)
- Range: 7,000 nmi (13,000 km; 8,100 mi) at 16 knots (30 km/h; 18 mph)
- Complement: 1,314 (private ship); 1,361 (flagship)
- Armament: 3 × triple BL 16 in (406 mm) Mk 1 guns; 6 × twin BL 6-in (152 mm) Mk XXII guns; 6 × single QF 4.7 in (120 mm) Mk VIII AA guns; 8 × single QF 2-pdr (40 mm) AA guns; 2 × 24.5 in (622 mm) torpedo tubes
- Armour: Waterline belt: 13–14 in (330–356 mm); Deck: 3.75–6.25 in (95–159 mm); Barbettes: 12–15 in (305–381 mm); Gun turrets: 9–16 in (229–406 mm); Conning tower: 6–14 in (152–356 mm); Bulkheads: 4–12 in (102–305 mm)

The Nelson class was a class of two battleships (Nelson and Rodney) of the British Royal Navy, built shortly after, and under the terms of, the Washington Naval Treaty of 1922. They were the only British battleships built between the Revenge class, ordered in 1913, and the King George V class, ordered in 1936.

The ships were named after famous British admirals: George Brydges Rodney, 1st Baron Rodney, victor of the Battle of Cape St. Vincent and the Battle of the Saintes, and Horatio Nelson, 1st Viscount Nelson, who won the Battles of the Nile and Trafalgar.

To comply with the limitations of the Washington Treaty, these ships were of an unusual design with many novel features. They are often referred to as the first treaty battleships. The Nelsons were unique in British battleship construction, being the only ships to carry a main armament of nine 16-inch (406 mm) guns. The most unusual feature however, and one that is immediately noticeable, is that these were all carried forward of the bridge.

Commissioned in 1927–29, the Nelsons served extensively in the Atlantic, Mediterranean, and Indian oceans during World War II. Rodney was made famous by her role in the sinking of the Bismarck in May 1941. At the climax of the battle Rodney, in conjunction with King George V, closed on Bismarck to bombard her at short range. Rodney's main guns were credited with an estimated 100 to 130 hits, contributing greatly to Bismarck's final destruction.

Nelson and Rodney participated in the bombardment of targets in northern France during and after D-Day. In particular, during the Caen campaign Nelson was credited with destroying a group of five Tiger tanks which ventured into a red zone [within 40 km (25 mi) of the coast] deemed by the German command to be in range of Allied battleships.

Both ships of the class survived the war, but were scrapped in 1948–1949 along with all other British battleships except the four remaining King George V–class battleships and Vanguard.

== Background and design ==
The Battle of Jutland had shown the value of firepower and protection over speed and maneuverability.

The next generation of British warships incorporated this lesson. After World War I, the Admiralty drew up plans for massive, heavily armoured battlecruisers and battleships, far larger and stronger than all previous vessels. The G3-class battlecruisers would carry 16-inch (406 mm) guns, and the proposed N3-class battleships would carry nine 18-inch (457 mm) guns, and would be the most powerful vessels afloat. The Royal Navy was planning to hold its superiority in the burgeoning arms race, despite the large warships planned in Japan and the United States.

Development was abruptly curtailed by the Washington Naval Treaty of 1922, which brought the arms race to a halt. The four battlecruisers that had been ordered were cancelled. Some of the material acquired would later be used in Nelson and Rodney. The Treaty limited all nations' battleships to maximum limits of 35,000 tons and 16-inch guns. The British had successfully ensured that the definition of maximum displacement – the standard displacement – excluded both fuel and boiler feed water. They had argued that having to protect the widespread British Empire meant their ships had to carry more of both and they should not be penalised compared to nations, such as Japan, France and Italy, that operated normally much closer to their home bases. As a result, water-filled internal anti-torpedo bulges could be incorporated, which did not contribute to the "dry" (standard) weights and therefore did not exceed the treaty displacement limits.

The limits of the treaty inevitably led to compromises in the design of two new ships, and the resulting Nelson class sacrificed installed power (and hence speed) in order that the ships be well-armed and defended. They were often referred to as the "Cherry Tree" class, because they had been "cut down by Washington". The need to limit displacement resulted in a radical new warship design, drawn from the "G3" and "N3" designs of Eustace Tennyson-d'Eyncourt, Director of Naval Construction from 1912 to 1924. To reduce the weight of armour, the main gun turrets were all mounted forward to shorten the armoured citadel. The "G3" and "N3" had two turrets forward of the bridge with the third between the bridge and the funnels/aft superstructure. However, in the Nelsons, this was taken further and all three were in front of the bridge; "B" mount superfiring over "A", with "X" turret on the forecastle deck behind "B", and therefore unable to fire directly forward or aft. "X" turret is sometimes referred to as "C" turret and one alternative design, designated "O3", had it superfiring over both "A" and "B" turrets. The secondary guns were placed in totally enclosed director-controlled twin turrets at the upper deck level and were grouped aft – another innovative element taken from the G3 and N3 design.

The machinery was of necessity limited in weight, size and installed power, and there were only two shafts with quite large screws. All previous British battleships after HMS Dreadnought of 1906 had four screws as did all British battleship classes after Nelson. In order that fuel gasses be kept clear of the superstructure, the boiler rooms were moved behind the engine rooms, exhausting into a single funnel. This orientation also reduced the overall length of the armoured citadel. As a countermeasure to the limited power, the hull was of a very efficient hydrodynamic form, to attain the best possible speed.

== Description ==
The Nelsons had a length between perpendiculars of 660 feet (201.2 m) and an overall length of 709 feet 10 inches (216.4 m) (Nelson) or 710 feet 3 inches (216.5 m) (Rodney), a beam of 106 feet (32.3 m), and a draught of 30 feet 4 inches (9.2 m) at mean standard load. They displaced 33,300–33,730 long tons (33,830–34,270 t) at standard load and 37,430–37,780 long tons (38,030–38,390 t) at deep load. Their crew numbered 1,361 officers and ratings when serving as flagships and 1,314 as private ships. At deep load, they had a metacentric height of 10.2 feet (3.1 m), which gave them a quick roll between 11.2 and 13.6 seconds. In calm weather, the Nelson-class ships were very manoeuvrable, but the large surface area of the superstructure gave them a large amount of weather helm and they could be a handful in confined spaces with a strong wind as was demonstrated when Nelson ran aground off Southsea beach in 1934.

The ships were powered by two sets of Brown-Curtis geared steam turbines, each driving one shaft, using steam from eight Admiralty 3-drum boilers fitted with superheaters that operated at a pressure of 250 psi (1,724 kPa; 17 atm). The turbines were rated at 45,000 shaft horsepower (34,000 kW) and intended to give the ship a maximum speed of 23 knots (43 km/h; 26 mph). The sister ships exceeded their designed speed during their sea trials in 1927, reaching speeds of 23.6–23.8 knots (43.7–44.1 km/h; 27.2–27.4 mph) from 45,614–46,031 shp (34,014–34,325 kW). They carried 3,770–3,805 long tons (3,830–3,866 t) of fuel oil to give them a designed range of 7,000 nautical miles (13,000 km; 8,100 mi) at a cruising speed of 16 knots (30 km/h; 18 mph).

=== Armour ===
Armour weight was also reduced by using an internal, inclined armour belt sloped outward at 18 degrees from the vertical. The armour belt was 14 in (360 mm) thick over the main magazines and control positions to 13 in (330 mm) over the machinery and 6-inch gun magazines. The slope increased the relative thickness of the belt to a plunging projectile. Water-filled compartments, surrounded by air-filled ones, formed internal torpedo bulges which were fitted between the armour and the external hull of the ship, which was not armoured. The outer hull plating was meant to initiate detonation of shells which would then explode outside the armour. This innovation dispensed with external torpedo bulges which would otherwise have reduced the speed of the ships due to drag. Underwater protection for the Nelsons was provided by a double bottom 5 feet (1.5 m) deep and a layered defence of an empty outer watertight compartment and an inner water-filled compartment. The torpedo defence system had a total depth of 12 feet (3.7 m) and was backed by a torpedo bulkhead 1.5 inches thick. The system was similar in design and effectiveness to that of Hood, and was rated to withstand an explosion of 750 lbs (340 kg) TNT. The armour scheme was of the "all or nothing" principle; areas were either well protected, from the front of "A" barbette rearwards to the after 6-inch turrets, or were not protected at all, disposing of the multiple intermediate thickness of armour seen in older designs. For the first time a British battleship had a single, 6.25 in (159 mm) thick armoured deck to protect against plunging shells and aircraft-launched bombs, with 3.75 in (95 mm) armour over the machinery spaces and 4.25 in (108 mm) armour on the lower deck over the stern, both on top of the 0.5 in (12.7 mm) deck plating. The main turrets had 16 in (410 mm) armour on the faces, 11 in (280 mm) on the sides, 7.25 in (184 mm) on the roof and 9 in (230 mm) on the rear with 15 in (380 mm) around the barbettes. The secondary turrets, however, had only 1 in (25 mm) NC all round over 0.5 in (12.7 mm) structural steel plates.

=== Superstructure ===
The large superstructure, which was octagonal in plan, was known to its crew as the "Octopoidal" and was sometimes referred to as "Queen Anne's Mansions" due to its similarity to a 14-storey brick residential development opposite St James's Park tube station in London. The superstructure provided spacious, weatherproof working spaces for the navigating officers and any flag officers embarked. Except for the emergency conning tower at its base, and the trunking for the main gun directors mounted on top, the superstructure was lightly armoured against splinters only, to save weight. Additional weight-saving design measures included the use of light materials such as aluminium for fittings, and fir instead of teak for deck planking, although subsequently, teak decks were fitted in the late 1920s, following concerns that the ships could not fire a full broadside without causing structural damage to the decks.

The Nelson class was a revolutionary but compromised design, and unsurprisingly, there were shortcomings. The location of the superstructure towards the stern caused manoeuvrability problems in high winds, especially when steaming at low speeds, where the superstructure acted somewhat like a mizzen sail permanently set, causing the ships to "weathervane" but according to Captain Hugh Binney, who commanded Nelson in the late twenties, "if this is kept in mind, no real difficulties should be encountered in any circumstances". This was potentially a problem in crowded harbours, and made the ships somewhat difficult to dock and embark although this issue never led to a major incident. Binney also stated "In the early stages of the ship's first commission, there was a general misconception that the Nelson class were unhandy and difficult to manoeuvre. Both my predecessor and myself, however, very soon discovered that this opinion was entirely fallacious! In calm weather, the ship's manoeuvring capabilities are in no way inferior, and in many ways superior to those of Queen Elizabeth or Revenge." They could also be awkward to manoeuvre when moving astern. This was attributed to the ships having a single, central rudder which was out of the propeller race of the twin screws. At sea, however, they were reported to handle well, with a comparatively small tactical diameter (turning circle) particularly when turning into the wind, according to Lt. Commander (later Rear Admiral) Galfry Gatacre RAN, who served in 1941–1942 as the navigator for both Nelson and subsequently Rodney. He reported no difficulty in navigating either ship through the boom gates at Scapa Flow. Nelson and Rodney were the only battleships never to have bumped the boom gate vessel as they passed through Hoxa Sound.

=== Armament ===
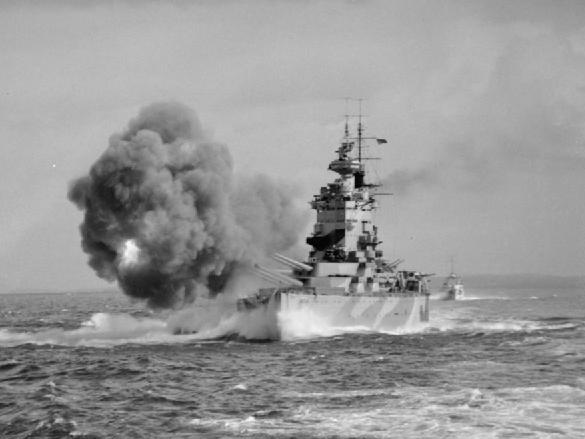
Nelson fires a salvo during gunnery trials in 1942

These ships were fitted with the HACS AA fire control system and the Admiralty Fire Control Table Mk I for surface fire control of the main armament.

Their main armament of nine 16-inch (406 mm) guns were mounted in triple turrets, the only RN battleships constructed in this manner. The Lion-class battleships, which were laid down in 1939 but cancelled in 1942, would have also carried nine 16-inch (406 mm) guns in triple turrets. The Nelson's innovation was an all-forward main armament orientation, in order to maximize the thickness of armor available for a given weight by making the citadel as short as possible, and this was subsequently copied by the French in the Dunkerque-class and Richelieu-class of battleships.

The BL 16-inch Mk I naval guns themselves deviated from standard British designs. Where previous RN weapons fired heavy shells at a moderate velocity, the Nelson's weapons followed the German practice of a lighter shell at a higher velocity. This change in Director of Naval Ordnance policy was due to British testing of surrendered German equipment after World War I, although much later, subsequent testing proved contradictory. Two different rifling rates were tried, and for some time there was a mixture of barrel types in different turrets, even sometimes within the same turret. The guns suffered considerable barrel wear and had a fairly large dispersion pattern, due mainly to the different riflings that each barrel had as they were refurbished over their lifespan. To compensate for barrel wear, muzzle velocities were reduced and a heavier (longer) shell was tried to offset this; but the cost of producing new shells, modifying shell handling and storage equipment came at a time when RN funding had been heavily reduced. The need to reduce displacement led to the use of triple mount turrets, which had early problems with the ammunition handling and loading machinery. The heavier weight of the triple in comparison to a twin turret meant increased stresses on the roller bearings when training the turrets. This was solved by the incorporation of spring-loaded vertical as well as conventional horizontal roller bearings. The triple mount turret proved itself when, in October 1929, a turret crew with two years' experience loaded and fired 33 consecutive rounds without mishap. The incorporation of many safety features, achieved with lighter materials, meant that the complex and relatively fragile equipment had to be serviced regularly over the ships' lifetime. Consequently the BL 16-inch Mk I were not generally considered by the RN to be as successful as the previous BL 15 inch Mark I; the BL 14-inch Mark VII, fitted to the subsequent King George V-class battleships, returned to a heavier (relatively) shell and lower velocity, but its performance was compromised by an over-complex quadruple-gun mounting that proved to have reliability defects in combat.

Firing trials revealed that the blast of 'A' and 'B' turrets on forward bearings caused damage to many weather-deck fittings and conditions on the mess-decks became very uncomfortable. There was a longstanding rumour that the ships could not fire a full broadside without risk of structural damage.[3] This was disproved during the action against the German battleship Bismarck, where Rodney fired upwards of 40 broadsides (380 shells) without major structural damage except to deck planking and upper deck fittings,[11] although damage to sickbay fittings, partition bulkheads, toilet bowls and plumbing in the forecastle was extensive. Virtually every light bulb in the forward section was shattered also.[9] When 'X' turret was fired 30 degrees abaft the beam and elevation of 40 degrees, considerable damage occurred to the two vertically stacked rows of bridge windows. As a result, the guns of "X" turret were usually prohibited from firing abaft of the beam at high elevations during peacetime practice firing. Fitting tempered glass in the bridge windows was tried, but gun blast still shattered some of them and filled the bridge with flying debris. The design of the Captain's bridge was altered on Nelson circa 1930–33 to reduce the window area and enclose the upper portion of the previous two rows of glass. A great deal of effort was expended in correcting this problem, and fitting of protective ledges below the new smaller windows proved successful. A new enclosed Admiral's bridge with its requisite reduced windows was built on top of the Captain's bridge and the forward signalling lamps were moved up one level and towards the aft of the bridge. The Admiral's bridge on Rodney remained stepped back somewhat from the forward edge of the tower, but the Captain's bridge had the same reduced area of glass that Nelson now had, with larger ledges. Blast was also a problem elsewhere; D.K. Brown tells of a test firing that was suspended when DNC observer H.S. Pengelly, who was beneath the foredeck, reported a bright red flash after firing all guns in "A" turret. This was later discovered to be caused by concussion of the observers' eyeballs.

In the final phase of the action against Bismarck, Rodney fired a pair of 24.5-inch torpedoes from her port-side tube and claimed one hit. According to Ludovic Kennedy, "if true, [this is] the only instance in history of one battleship torpedoing another". Earlier in this same action the starboard side tube had its sluice door jammed as the result of a near miss from one of Bismarck's early salvos. On 27 September 1941, Nelson's port torpedo station almost proved to be a liability when an Italian air-launched 18-inch torpedo holed the compartment behind the torpedo body room, allowing 3,750 tons of water to enter the ship. Following this, Nelson's torpedo tubes may have been removed although another source suggests the torpedo tubes were retained in both ships into 1945.

== Summary ==
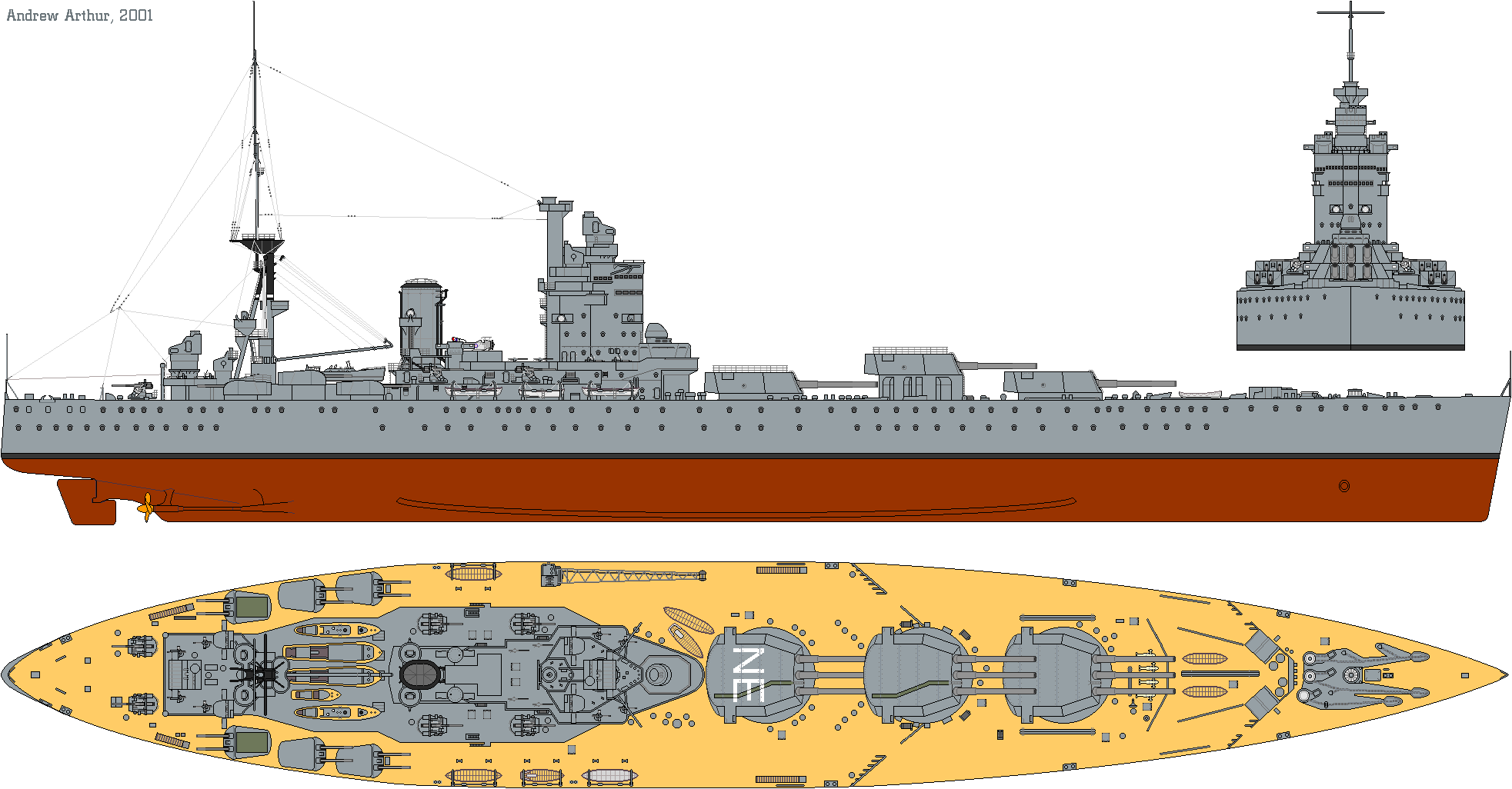
3-view profile drawing of HMS Nelson as she was in 1931, with Fairey Flycatcher aircraft carried amidships

Because of their unusual silhouettes, HMS Nelson and Rodney were nicknamed Nelsol and Rodnol by Royal Navy sailors as their single-funnelled profiles reminded Navy men of a series of fleet oilers that had been built during the First World War bearing names starting with "Ol", the Ol class.

Despite the derisive criticism directed at this class of battleship by some of the media and some sailors upon their debut, naval historian Antony Preston considered that "they were soundly conceived ships reflecting all the hard-won experience of World War One" and that "they proved to be very well-protected and well-designed ships".

== Ships in class ==
Construction data
Name	Namesake	Builder	Ordered	Laid down	Launched	Commissioned	Fate
Nelson	Vice-admiral Horatio Nelson	Armstrong Whitworth, Walker	11 December 1922	28 December 1922	3 September 1925	15 August 1927	Sold for scrap, 5 January 1949
Rodney	Admiral George Rodney	Cammell Laird, Birkenhead	11 December 1922	28 December 1922	17 December 1925	7 December 1927	Sold for scrap, 19 March 1948

== Construction and career ==
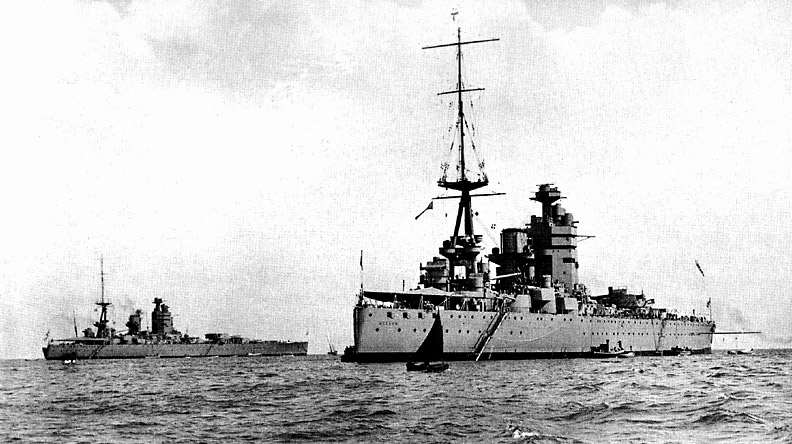
Nelson and Rodney

By the end of the war, Rodney had seen hard use without any significant refit or repair and was worn out, especially her machinery. Nelson had been refitted in the United States at the end of 1944 and was in sufficiently good condition to serve in the postwar fleet including a short period as flagship of the Home Fleet at the end of 1945. Rodney was scrapped in 1948 at Inverkeithing, not long after the Revenge-class battleships and Queen Elizabeth-class battleships, and Nelson in 1949 following its use as a target for bombing trials. "According to Winston Churchill's memoirs, a major modernisation was discussed to enable Nelson to serve for several years in the postwar fleet, but no other details have survived. In any case Nelson was too slow for the modern fleet which had no front-line role for battleships any more".
