= G3 battlecruiser =

Abortive class of British Royal Navy battlecruisers

- A 1:96 scale model of a G3 battlecruiser

Class overview
- Name: G3
- Operators: Royal Navy
- Preceded by: Admiral class
- Succeeded by: None
- Planned: 4
- Completed: 0
- Canceled: 4

General characteristics (as of November 1921)
- Type: Battlecruiser
- Displacement: 48,400 long tons (49,200 t) (normal); 53,909 long tons (54,774 t) (deep load)
- Length: 856 ft (260.9 m)
- Beam: 106 ft (32.3 m)
- Draught: 35 ft 8 in (10.9 m) (at deep load)
- Installed power: 20 small-tube boilers; 160,000 shp (120,000 kW)
- Propulsion: 4 shafts; 4 geared steam turbines
- Speed: 32 knots (59 km/h; 37 mph)
- Range: 7,000 nautical miles (13,000 km; 8,100 mi) at 16 knots (30 km/h; 18 mph)
- Complement: 1,716
- Armament: 3 × triple 16 in (406 mm) guns; 8 × twin 6 in (152 mm) guns; 6 × single 4.7-inch (120 mm) AA guns; 4 × 8-barrel 2-pdr (40 mm (1.6 in)) mountings; 2 × 24.5-inch (622 mm) torpedo tubes
- Armour: Belt: 12–14 in (305–356 mm); Deck: 3–8 in (76–203 mm); Barbettes: 11–14 in (279–356 mm); Turrets: 8–17.5 in (203–444 mm); Conning tower: 8 in (203 mm); Bulkheads: 10–12 in (254–305 mm)

The G3 class was a class of battlecruisers planned by the Royal Navy after the end of World War I in response to naval expansion programmes by the United States and Japan. The four ships of this class would have been larger, faster and more heavily armed than any existing battleship (although several projected foreign ships would be larger). The G3s have been considered to be proper "fast battleships" since they were well-balanced designs with adequate protection. Nonetheless, the class was officially designated as a "battlecruiser" due to their higher speed and lesser firepower and armour relative to the planned N3-class battleship design. The G3s would have carried nine 16-inch (406 mm) guns and were expected to achieve 32 knots (59 km/h; 37 mph), while the N3s would carry nine 18-inch (457 mm) guns on the same displacement at the expense of speed.

The G3 design was approved by the Board of Admiralty on 12 August 1921. Orders were placed in October, but were suspended in mid-November shortly after the beginning of the Washington Naval Conference which limited battleship sizes. The orders were cancelled in February 1922 with the ratification of the Washington Naval Treaty which limited construction to ships of no more than 35,000 long tons (36,000 t) displacement.

== Background ==
In 1916 the US had declared its intention to create a Navy "second to none"; the United States Congress had authorized the building of a large number of battleships and battlecruisers. In the aftermath of the First World War, the Japanese government were also embarking on a large programme of warship building. Meanwhile, in Great Britain, the Queen Elizabeth-class battleships were followed by the slower and cheaper Revenge class. Two improved Revenge-class hulls were converted during construction into the two Renown-class battlecruisers as emergency builds during the war. The only new capital ships laid down in the war were the Admiral-class battlecruisers. Their design had been called into question after the Battle of Jutland in 1916. Three of this class were cancelled, leaving only Hood to be completed to an altered design.

The US plan had been delayed by the wartime need to build smaller vessels. Nevertheless, estimates by the Admiralty were that by the early 1920s the UK would be behind in ships. The British did have access to German technology through ships such as the battleship Baden which had been saved from the scuttling of the interned German High Seas Fleet in Scapa Flow and the experiences of the war. A committee concluded that any new ship should be able to match the speed of the new US Lexington-class battlecruisers, expected to make 32 knots. Consequently, a series of designs was prepared of ships with displacements ranging from 53,100 to 44,500 long tons (54,000 to 45,200 t), the only limitations being the ability to use British dockyards and passage through the Suez Canal. These designs were given letters of the alphabet running backwards from K to G. The related battleship designs under consideration at the same time had design letters from L upwards.

The first two design proposals, 'K2' and 'K3', had a general layout similar to Hood, but were armed with either eight or nine 18-inch guns, in four twin or three triple gun turrets, respectively. The numeral in the designation came from the number of guns in each turret. These ships were very large, displacing 52,000 to 53,100 long tons (52,800 to 54,000 t), could only reach 30 knots (56 km/h; 35 mph), and could only be docked in a single ex-German floating dock and one dock, Gladstone Dock, in Liverpool. The next proposal, 'J3' saved nearly 10,000 long tons (10,000 t) by reducing the main armament to nine 50-calibre 15-inch (381 mm) guns and the main deck armour to 4 in (102 mm). This reduction in size allowed the ship to dock anywhere that Hood could dock and to pass through the Suez and Panama Canals. 'I3' took another route in saving weight and concentrated the main armament amidships with 'X' turret placed between the forward superstructure and the funnels. The consequent weight savings were negated by additional hull and machinery weights and the ship displaced only slightly less than 'K3'. It had the advantage, however, that it could be docked in Rosyth and Portsmouth and pass through both canals, once the Suez Canal had been deepened. The primary drawback was that the main armament had a blind spot towards the rear of the ship of not less than 40°. Several variations were evaluated of the 'H3' design with the number of turrets reduced. In 'H3a' both turrets were forward of the superstructure while in 'H3b' one was forward and the other was aft of the forward superstructure. 'H3c' retained the layout of 'H3b', but lowered the turrets by one deck and saved 1,250 long tons (1,270 t) over the 45,000 long tons (46,000 t) of 'H3b'. All three 'H3' designs had a maximum speed of 33 knots (61 km/h; 38 mph), but the reduced number of main guns was disliked so the 'G3' was proposed with the three triple turrets, armed with 16.5-inch (419 mm) guns to save weight.

This design was accepted at the end of 1920, but changes were made as the plans were finalized in early 1921, including the reduction of the ship's horsepower from 180,000 to 160,000 and the reduction of the main armament from 16.5 in to 16 in (406 mm).

== Design and description ==
The G3s incorporated several novel features for dreadnought-era capital ships, or at least for British designs of this type. Most immediately noticeable was the concentration of the main battery forward of the bridge and engineering spaces, giving the ships a tanker-like appearance. Since the G3s were to use existing dockyard facilities, this layout allowed designers to keep the length of the ships, as well as the weight of armour, to a minimum. The resulting loss of heavy fire astern was considered justifiable since the ships were intended to fight on the broadside. A related feature of the G3 and N3 designs was their tower bridge structure behind the first two gun turrets. This provided a better and more stable foundation for fire-control equipment, greatly improved accommodation and protection from the weather.

=== General characteristics ===
The G3 battlecruisers were significantly larger than their predecessors of the Admiral class. They had an overall length of 856 feet (260.9 m), a beam of 106 feet (32.3 m), and a draught of 36 feet (11.0 m) at deep load. They would have displaced 48,400 long tons (49,200 t) normally and 53,909 long tons (54,774 t) at deep load, over 8,000 long tons (8,100 t) more than the older ships. They had a metacentric height of 7.786 feet (2.4 m) at deep load as well as a complete double bottom.

=== Propulsion ===
The G3 battlecruisers would have had four geared steam turbine sets, each of which drove one propeller shaft. They were arranged in three engine rooms. The forward engine room held the two turbines for the wing shafts, the middle compartment housed the turbine for the port inner shaft and the aft engine room contained the turbine for the starboard inner shaft. The turbines were powered by 20 Yarrow small-tube boilers divided between nine boiler rooms. They were designed to produce a total of 160,000 shaft horsepower (120,000 kW) at a working pressure of 200 psi (1,379 kPa) and temperature of 392 °F (200 °C) with superheat. Maximum speed would have been 32 knots (59 km/h; 37 mph).

The ships had a maximum capacity of 5,000 long tons (5,100 t) of fuel oil. Using the 22,000-shaft-horsepower (16,000 kW) cruising turbines, they had an estimated maximum range of 7,000 nautical miles (13,000 km; 8,100 mi) at 16 knots (30 km/h; 18 mph). They had six turbo-driven 250-kilowatt (335 hp) dynamos and two 300-kilowatt (402 hp) diesel generators.

=== Armament ===
Housing the main armament in triple turrets was new to the Royal Navy though British companies had been involved in the production of triple gun turret designs for other navies. The choice of a high muzzle velocity with a relatively lighter shell was taken from the German practice; it ran counter to previous British guns such as the BL 15-inch Mark I gun of 42-calibre length which were lower-muzzle-velocity weapons firing heavy shells.

The G3 design mounted nine BL 16-inch Mark I 45-calibre guns in three triple hydraulically powered Mark I gun turrets, designated 'A', 'B', and 'X' from front to rear. The guns could be depressed to −3° and elevated to 40°. The ships' maximum stowage was 116 shells per gun. They fired 2,048-pound (929 kg) projectiles at a muzzle velocity of 2,670 ft/s (810 m/s). Their maximum range was about 38,000 yards (35,000 m) at maximum elevation. The G3s carried a secondary armament of sixteen BL 6-inch Mark XXII guns in superfiring twin turrets instead of casemates or shields – the first time in a British capital ship since the Lord Nelson class of 1904. Four turrets were sited around the forward superstructure and four at the stern. The forward turrets were provided with 150 rounds per gun and the rear turrets with 110 rounds per gun. The guns could elevate between –5° and +60°. They fired 100-pound (45 kg) projectiles at a muzzle velocity of 2,945 ft/s (898 m/s). Their maximum range was 25,800 yd (23,600 m) at 45° elevation. Their rate of fire was five rounds per minute.

An anti-aircraft battery of six QF 4.7-inch Mark VIII guns was included. They had a maximum depression of -5° and a maximum elevation of 90°. They fired a 50-pound (23 kg) high explosive shell at a muzzle velocity of 2,457 ft/s (749 m/s) at a rate of eight to twelve rounds per minute. The guns had a maximum ceiling of 32,000 ft (9,800 m), but an effective range of much less. A maximum of 256 rounds per gun could be carried. The ships were intended to carry four 8-barreled mountings for the 40-millimetre (1.6 in) QF 2-pounder Mark VIII gun (commonly known as a pom-pom), two abaft the funnels and two at the stern. Each barrel was provided with 1300 rounds of ammunition. The gun fired a 40-millimetre (1.6 in) 2-pound (0.91 kg) shell at a muzzle velocity of 1,920 ft/s (590 m/s) to a distance of 3,800 yards (3,500 m). The gun's rate of fire was approximately 96–98 rounds per minute.

Like previous classes of British battlecruisers, a pair of submerged, broadside-firing torpedo tubes were planned for these ships. Their compartment was located just forward of the 'A' shell room on the platform deck. Six 24.5-inch (620 mm) torpedoes per tube were to be carried in peacetime, but this would increase to eight in wartime. These Mark I torpedoes had a warhead of 743 pounds (337 kg) of TNT and were powered by oxygen-enriched air. They had two speed settings which governed their range: either 15,000 yards (13,716 m) at 35 knots (65 km/h; 40 mph), or 20,000 yards (18,288 m) at 30 knots (56 km/h; 35 mph).

=== Fire-control ===
The main guns of the G3 battlecruisers could be controlled from any of the three director-control towers (DCT). The primary DCT was mounted at the top of the forward superstructure. Another was mounted on the roof of the conning tower in an armoured hood and the third was aft. Each main gun turret was provided with a 41-foot (12.5 m) coincidence rangefinder in an armoured housing on the turret roof. The secondary armament was primarily controlled by three DCTs. Two mounted on each side of the bridge and the third was aft. The anti-aircraft guns were controlled by a high-angle control system mounted on the very top of the forward superstructure. Each pom-pom mount had its own director and there was also a height-finder aft. Two 15-foot (4.6 m) torpedo rangefinders were located on the sides of the funnels.

=== Armour ===
A first for any British dreadnought was the use of the all or nothing protection scheme in the G3s. Medium-thickness armour had proven to be useless in stopping heavy-calibre shells during World War I so the vital areas of the ship were protected by the thickest possible armour and the rest of the ship was left unarmoured. Use of this system was pioneered by contemporary U.S. Navy battleship designs starting with the Nevada class. However, this system of protection required that the armoured citadel should have enough reserve buoyancy to keep the ship stable even were the rest of the hull riddled by gunfire.

The waterline belt of the G3 had a maximum thickness of 14 inches (356 mm) with the top of the armour angled 18° outwards. This angle increased the armor's relative thickness to horizontal, close-range fire, albeit at the cost of reducing its relative height which increased the chance of plunging shellfire going over or under it. It ran some 522 feet (159.1 m), from the forward edge of 'A' barbette to the rear of the after 6-inch magazine. The belt had a height of 14 feet 3 inches (4.3 m), of which 4 feet 6 inches (1.4 m) was below the designed waterline. Only the forward 259 feet (78.9 m) of the belt had the maximum thickness, it thinned to 12 inches (305 mm) for the rest of its length. The lower edge of the belt abreast the magazines was continued down another 3 feet (0.9 m) by a 4 inches (100 mm) thickness of high-tensile steel inclined at 36° to prevent a shell from reaching the magazines via a wave trough at high speed. The forward and rear ends of the belt terminated in 12-inch and 10-inch (254 mm) transverse bulkheads respectively. The waterline belt extended forward 46 feet (14.0 m) at a thickness of 6 inches that reduced to 2.25 inches (57 mm) in two steps.

The funnel and boiler room ventilation shafts were surrounded by an armoured box 116 feet (35.4 m) long intended to prevent shells fired from behind the ship reaching 'X' magazine. The box narrowed at an angle of 21° as it rose and had a maximum thickness of 12 inches nearest to the magazine. Aft it reduced in a series of steps to 9 inches (229 mm), 6 inches, 5 inches (127 mm) and 4 inches (102 mm). The armoured deck matched the length of the waterline belt and sloped down 2.5° to meet the upper edge of the belt. It had a maximum thickness of 8 inches (203 mm) from the 'A' barbette to partway over the mid-boiler rooms and thinned to a minimum of 4 inches over the rear engine and boiler rooms. The deck's thickness increased to 7 inches (180 mm) partway over the rear engine room and covered the aft 6-inch magazines. The armoured deck extended forward 46 feet over the torpedo compartment with a maximum thickness of 8 inches, thinning to 6 inches. The armoured deck's rear extension was 106 feet 9 inches (32.5 m) long and was 5 inches thick until the last 27 feet 4 inches (8.3 m) when it thinned to 3 inches (76 mm).

The turret faces were 17.5 inches (444 mm) thick while their sides ranged from 9 to 13 inches (229 to 330 mm) in thickness, and the roof was 8 inches thick. The armour of the barbettes ranged from 11 to 14 inches (279 to 356 mm) in thickness and it was carefully arranged to minimize the likely risk. The conning tower armour was 9 to 12 inches thick and its communications tube to the upper deck was 8 inches thick. The fire-control director atop the conning tower was protected by an armoured hood 3 to 5 inches thick.

The anti-torpedo bulges of the G3 battlecruisers were intended to withstand the explosion of a 750-pound (340 kg) torpedo warhead. They consisted of an outer air space, an inner buoyancy space and the torpedo bulkhead that consisted of two layers of .875-inch (22 mm) high-tensile steel. The bulkhead was situated some 13.5 feet (4.1 m) inboard from the side of the ship. Postwar tests done on a replica of this system showed that filling the buoyancy space with water rather than the sealed steel crushing tubes as used in Hood was just as effective and weighed less. A compressed air system was fitted to blow the water out of the buoyancy spaces and bring the ship upright in 15 minutes after two torpedo hits. The ship's double bottom ranged from 5–7 feet (1.5–2.1 m) in depth.

== Orders and cancellation ==
At the end of the tendering process, the four G3 battlecruisers were ordered on 24 October 1921, without names, from John Brown, Swan Hunter, William Beardmore and Fairfield. Following the visit of an Admiralty delegation, detailed constructional drawings were sent to John Brown on 3 November with a request that copies be urgently circulated to the other successful contractors. Work at John Brown progressed on the keel blocks and hull plates for the subsequent two weeks. Notwithstanding other events, instructions and amendments continued to arrive from various departments within the Admiralty until 25 November.

The Washington Naval Conference on arms limitation between the five leading naval powers which began negotiations on 11 November 1921, led to the suspension of building on 18 November. Outright cancellation followed on 21 February 1922 with the Washington Naval Treaty signatories agreeing not to build any ship larger than 35,000 long tons (36,000 t). As no photographic evidence is available to show the ships' keels were actually laid down, it is asserted by at least one historian that none were, although the Admiralty paid John Brown for work and materials which would have been incurred in doing so.

Many of the aspects of their design ultimately were incorporated into the two Nelson-class battleships, and they are often described as being a cut-down G3. The Nelsons received the design designation 'O3', marking them as next in the design sequence from the 'N3' battleship design although they used the guns intended for the G3 class for cost reasons and to comply with the Treaty's 16-inch limitation on main armament.

== See also ==
- Lexington-class battlecruiser – a contemporary U.S. design also cancelled as a result of the Washington Treaty
- Amagi-class battlecruiser – a series of four battlecruisers planned for the Imperial Japanese Navy as part of their "Eight-eight fleet", cancelled as a result of the Washington Treaty

== Bibliography ==
- Brown, David K. (1999). The Grand Fleet: Warship Design and Development 1906–1922. Annapolis, Maryland: Naval Institute Press. ISBN 1-55750-315-X.
- Burt, R. A. (1993). British Battleships, 1919–1939. London: Arms and Armour Press. ISBN 1-85409-068-2.
- Campbell, John (1985). Naval Weapons of World War II. Annapolis, Maryland: Naval Institute Press. ISBN 0-87021-459-4.
- Johnston, Ian (2011). Clydebank Battlecruisers: Forgotten Photographs from John Brown's Shipyard. Barnsley, Yorkshire: Seaforth Publishing. ISBN 978-1-84832-113-7.
- Campbell, N. J. M. (1977). "Washington's Cherry Trees, Part 1". Warship. I (1). London: Conway Maritime Press: 2–12. ISBN 0-87021-975-8.
- Campbell, N. J. M. (1977). "Washington's Cherry Trees, Part 2". Warship. I (2). London: Conway Maritime Press: 12–19. ISBN 0-87021-975-8.
- Campbell, N. J. M. (1977). "Washington's Cherry Trees, Part 3". Warship. I (3). London: Conway Maritime Press: 38–45. ISBN 0-87021-975-8.
- Raven, Alan & Roberts, John (1976). British Battleships of World War Two: The Development and Technical History of the Royal Navy's Battleship and Battlecruisers from 1911 to 1946. Annapolis, Maryland: Naval Institute Press. ISBN 0-87021-817-4.
