= BL 16-inch Mk I naval gun =

Ordnance BL 16 inch Mark I
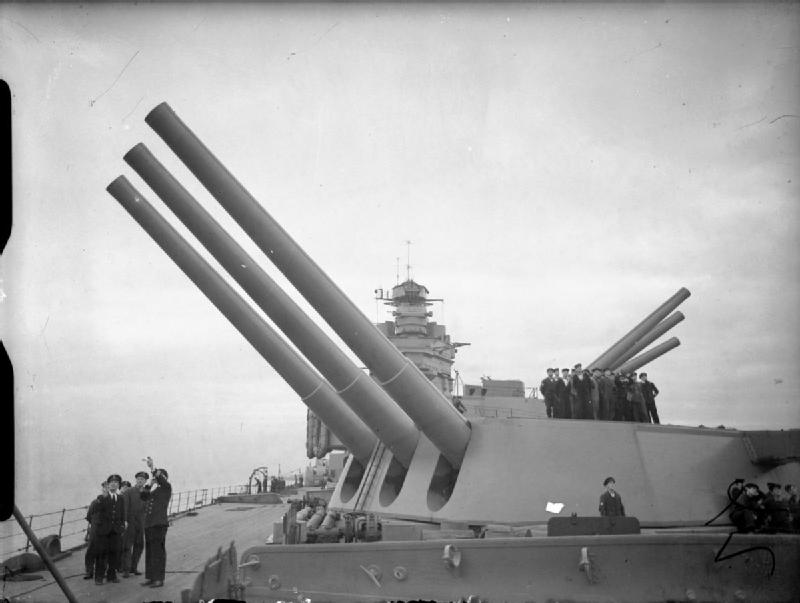
- Guns of HMS Rodney at maximum elevation, 1940
- Type: Naval Gun
- Place of origin: UK

Service history
- In service: 1927–1948
- Used by: UK

Production history
- Designed: 1922

Specifications
- Mass: 108 tons (109.7 tonnes)
- Length: 61 ft 10 in (18.85 m)
- Barrel length: 60 ft (18.3 m) L/45
- Shell: separate charge, AP shell
- Shell weight: 2,048 pounds (929 kg)
- Calibre: 16 inch (406 mm)
- Breech: Welin
- Elevation: 40°/-3° in mounting Mark I
- Rate of fire: 2 rounds per minute as fitted
- Muzzle velocity: 2,586 feet/second (788 m/s)
- Effective firing range: 35,000 yards (32,000 m) at 32° elevation
- Maximum firing range: 39,780 yards (36,375 m)

The BL 16-inch Mark I was a British naval gun introduced in the 1920s and used on the two Nelson-class battleships. A breech-loading gun, the barrel was 45 calibres long ("/45" in shorthand) meaning 45 times the 16-inch (406 mm) bore – 60 ft (18 m) long.

== Description ==
These wire-wound built-up guns had originally been planned for the cancelled G3-class battlecruiser design upon which the Nelson class drew.

Sir W. G. Armstrong Whitworth & Company at Elswick, Vickers at Barrow-in-Furness, William Beardmore & Company at Dalmuir and the Royal Gun Factory at Woolwich made a total of 29 guns of which 18 would be required for both ships at any time.

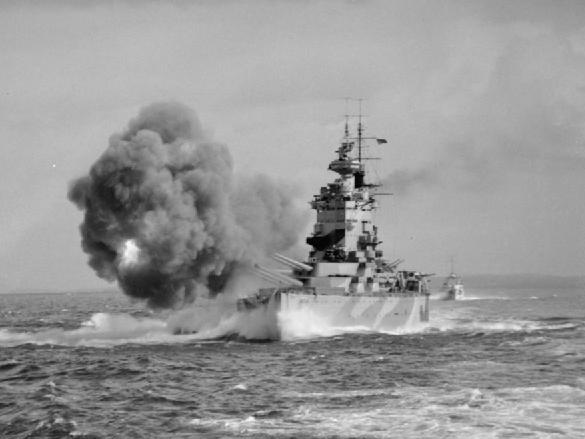
HMS Nelson firing a salvo during gunnery trials, 1942

These guns broke with the example offered by the earlier 15-inch Mk I gun, which fired a heavy shell at a rather low muzzle velocity and instead fired a rather light shell at a high muzzle velocity; this was not a success, as at that muzzle velocity the gun wore rapidly and the accuracy was unsatisfactory, so much that it was lowered. A heavier shell was proposed but not adopted because of stringent budget policies of the 1930s; this naval gun was not seen as much of a success.

== Successor ==
An improved weapon, the BL 16-inch Mark II was designed for the Lion-class battleship which was a successor to the King George V class taking advantage of the larger weapon allowed under the London Naval Treaty from March 1938. This "new design" of 16-inch gun fired a shell that weighed 2,375 pounds (1,077 kg). Construction of first two Lion-class battleships - each of which was to have nine 16-inch guns - was halted at the start of the Second World War; only a few months after they were laid down. Work on the armament continued for a while but that was also stopped after only four guns and no turrets were produced.

== See also ==
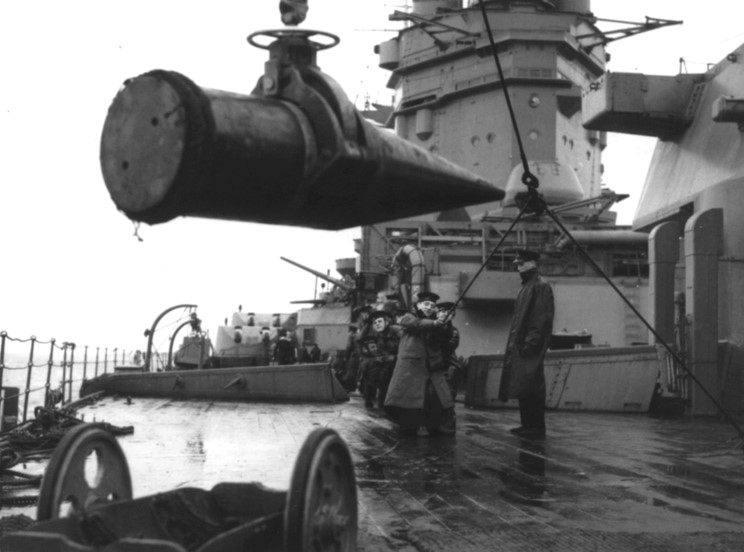
Loading 16-inch shells onto HMS Rodney

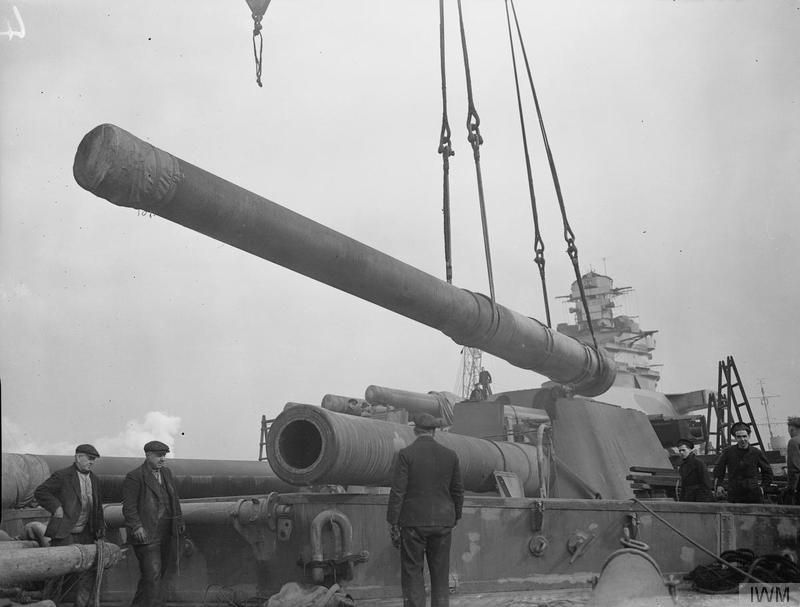
Installing 16-inch gun on HMS Rodney, 1942

=== Weapons of comparable role, performance and era ===
- 41 cm/45 3rd Year Type naval gun: Japanese equivalent
- 16"/45 caliber Mk 1, 5 & 8 gun: American equivalent
