= All or nothing (armor) =

Method of naval warship armor

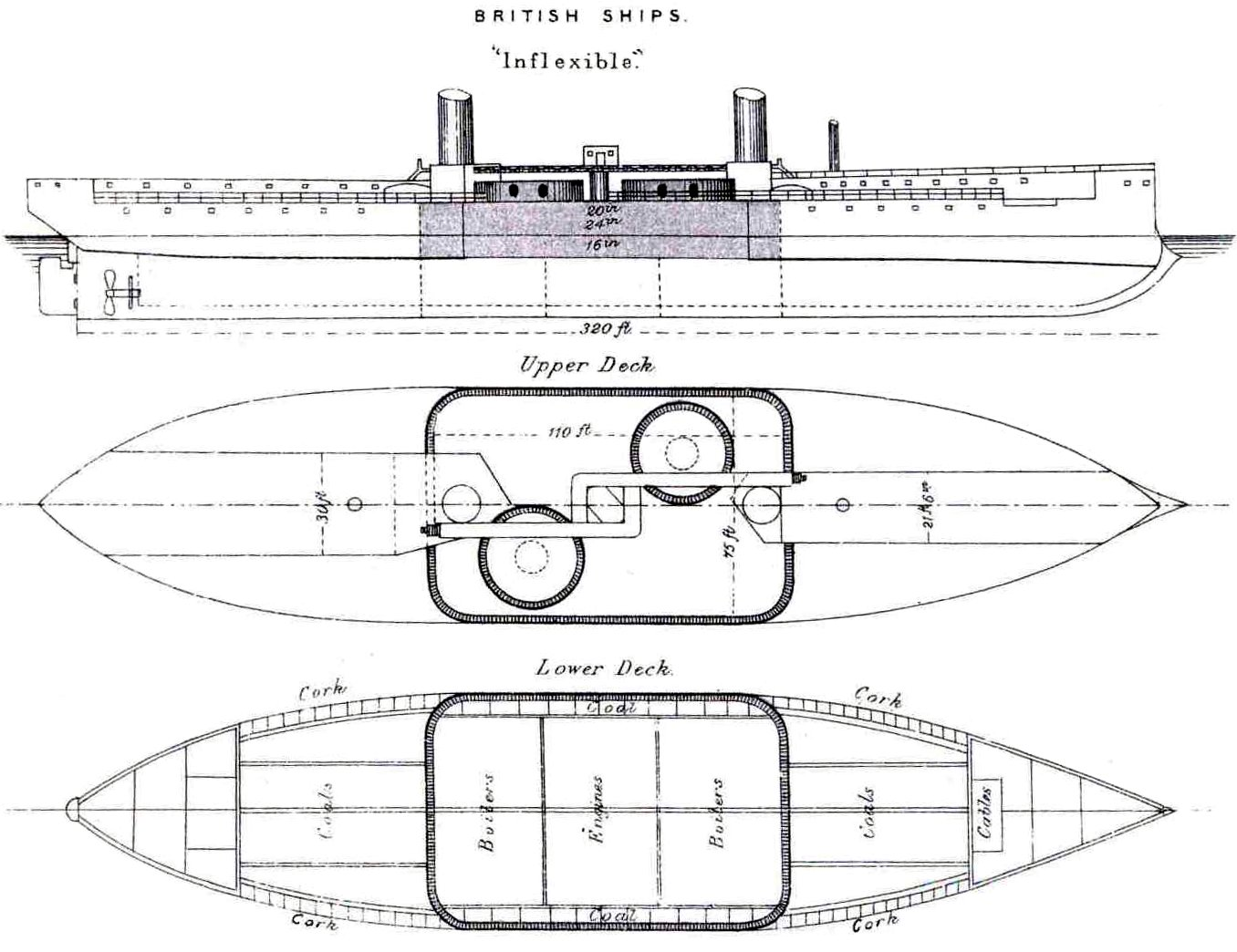
The Inflexible as shown in Brassey's Naval Annual (1888) showing the armor-clad central citadel

All or nothing is a method of naval warship armor, best known for its employment on dreadnought battleships. The concept involves heavily armoring the areas most important to a ship while the rest of the ship receives no armor. The "all or nothing" concept avoided light or moderate thicknesses of armor: armor was used in the greatest practicable thickness or not at all, thereby providing "either total or negligible protection". Compared to previous armoring systems, "all or nothing" ships had thicker armor covering a smaller proportion of the hull.

The ironclad battleship HMS Inflexible launched in 1876 had featured a heavily armored central citadel, with relatively unarmored ends; however, by the era of HMS Dreadnought, battleships were armored over the length of the ship with varying zones of heavy, moderate or light armor. The U.S. Navy adopted what was formally called "all or nothing" armor in the Standard-type battleships, starting with the Nevada class laid down in 1912. The Imperial Japanese Navy soon implemented the system in its Nagato-class battleships starting in 1917, and "All or Nothing" armor was later adopted by other navies after the First World War, beginning with the Royal Navy in its Nelson class.

== Rationale ==
Traditionally, a warship's armor system was designed both separately from, and after, the design layout. The design and location of various component subsystems (propulsion, steering, fuel storage and management, communications, range-finding, etc.) were laid out and designed in a manner that presented the most efficient and economical utilization of the hull's displacement. Then, armorers would attempt to design the application of barriers and deflectors which would protect vital areas of the hull, the superstructure, and its interior compartments from enemy shellfire, underwater mines, and torpedo attacks. There would also be attention paid to the limiting of sympathetic damage to hull compartments and spaces, caused as a consequence of primary damage to those hull compartments that directly received shellfire or underwater explosions.

The result of this approach was that armorers were "decorating" a warship's hull, interior compartments, and spaces with armor, not according to any overall scheme or protective design. Taken collectively, the total weight of armor yielded by this absence of an overall plan for protection was, in total, far greater than what a realistic hull displacement could float. Consequently, naval architects of the hull and its propulsion system would demand a reduction in the weight of armor applied until the hull displacement and the deadweight of the hull returned the ship's hull form to the range, speed, and stability of the original design performance as specified.

However, the continuing advances of larger-caliber guns, greater muzzle velocities, more accurate fire at longer ranges, and more energetic explosive fills of the shells demanded drastic improvements in armor protection. Some means had to be found to integrate armor protection into the total design of the warship at its inception. The rational application of armor had to achieve the most efficient use of the hull's displacement to provide buoyancy to the deadweight of the ship's armor. "All or nothing" was the design solution.

The "all-or-nothing" philosophy of armor design required the complete rethinking of battleship design, armor systems and the integration of the ship's design architecture with the armor protection system. With the rethinking of design, naval architects had to examine every system and function of a warship and determine the functions and systems that were critical. The systems were assessed as to priority, relationships, and location within the hull and superstructure.

The design was intended to ensure that battleships could (a) survive against the heaviest armor-piercing shells in use in the early part of the 20th century, (b) be able to carry powerful armament, and (c) retain useful speed and endurance. That was made possible by dispensing with the large areas of relatively light armor used in previous battleship designs. The weight saved was used to strengthen the armor protecting the vital areas of the ship, centralized within a compact space. The logic of the design was simple: if the ship were hit in vital areas (the ammunition and propellant magazines; the propulsion plant; the fire-control, command and communications sections), her survival was in jeopardy. On the other hand, if the ship were hit in non-vital areas (non-explosive stores, crew berthing and rest areas, offices and administrative areas), it would most likely not result in the ship's destruction. The armor also strengthened the hull.

In the ideal form of the system, all of a battleship's armor is concentrated to form an armored "citadel" around the ship's magazine spaces. The citadel is an armoured box of uniform thickness designed to defend against the largest enemy guns. The propulsion plant, communications systems, weapons, ammunition stores, and command and control of the ship were located in a single area within and beneath the armored citadel. By stripping away the armor from all other parts of the ship, the armor of the citadel could be made thicker. Save for the turrets, the ammunition hoists, the conning tower and part of the steering gear, nothing in the way of armor protected the remainder of the ship. When battle stations were called, the whole crew retreated into this area behind armored bulkheads and armored, watertight doors.

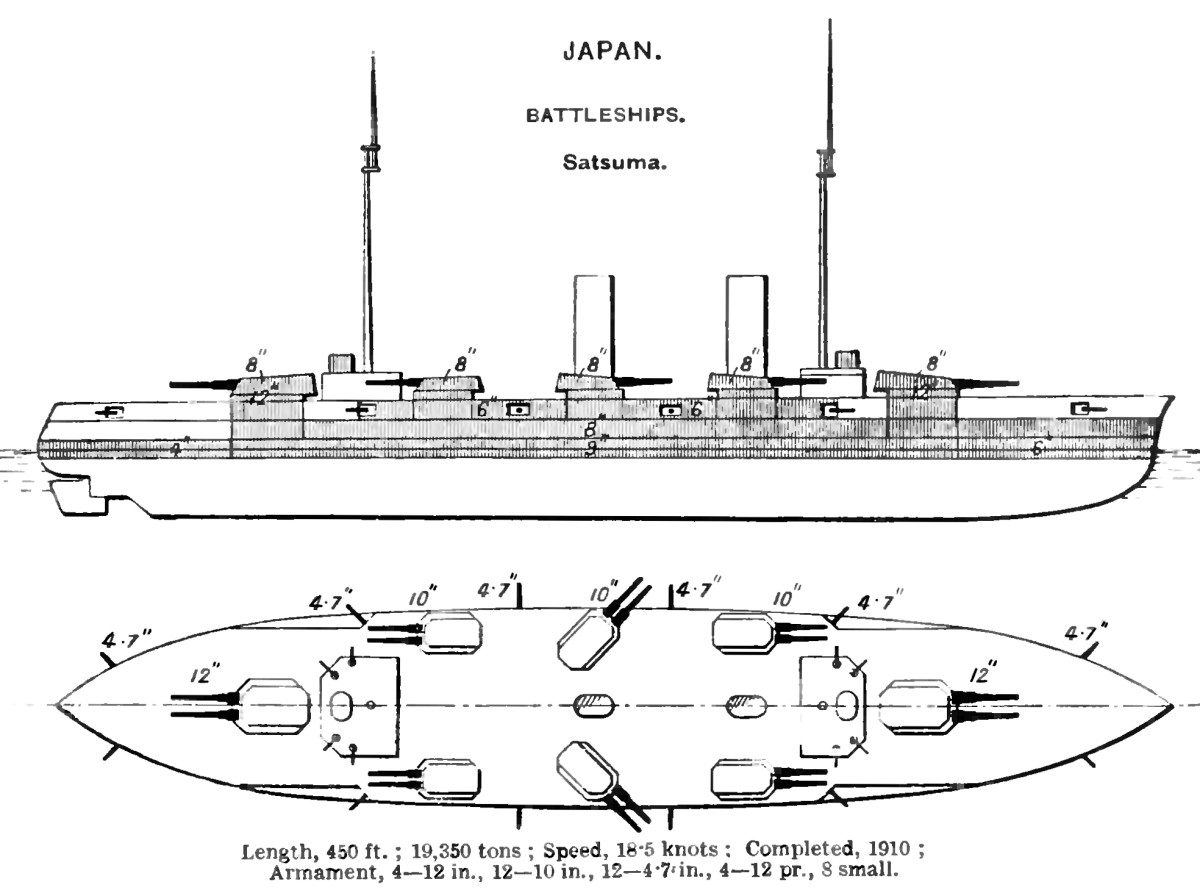
The "semi-dreadnought" Satsuma with belt and turret armor shown (shaded areas)

The citadel can be visualized as an open-bottomed (closed top) rectangular armored raft with sloped sides sitting within the hull of the ship. From the box, shafts known as barbettes would lead upwards to the ship's main gun turrets and conning tower. Although it was desirable for the citadel to be as small as possible, the space enclosed was an important source of reserve buoyancy and helped prevent the ship from foundering when other compartments had flooded. Through compartmentalization and the redundancy of key systems, any damage done to the ship outside this armored box would likely be survivable. As long as those systems within the box remained intact, the ship could continue to fight. In effect, the scheme accepted vulnerability to medium-caliber and high-explosive shells striking the unarmored sections of the hull, in order to improve resistance against large-caliber armor-piercing shells without increasing the overall weight of armor. The unarmored parts of the ship would not offer enough resistance to armor-piercing shells to trigger their firing mechanisms (designed to explode after penetrating armor) so the shells would pass through without exploding, while the vital parts could have armor thick enough to resist the heaviest shells.

To maximize the thickness of armor available for a given weight, it was desirable that the citadel be as small as possible. One way to achieve this was to concentrate the main battery in three turrets of triple or even two turrets of quadruple (quad) gun mountings, as opposed to four twin turrets typical during the First World War. In some cases, the turrets had an all-forward layout, such as the Royal Navy's Nelson class and the French Navy's Dunkerque class. Another way is more compact and efficient machinery such as the French navy's use of "supercharged" Indret boilers for the Dunkerque class or the US Navy's decision to combine double-reduction gear turbines with extreme steam conditions (ultra high heat and pressure) in the North Carolina class, South Dakota class and Iowa class.

== Evolution ==
The majority of the battleships up through World War I vintage had armor disposed in belts of varying thickness around the hull, concentrating the main thickness at the point where the majority of the enemy shells would impact. The result of long years of experience, these bands of armor were effective protection when ships fought at close range. As the caliber of guns grew and fire-control systems improved, engagement ranges increased, so that a greater number of hits would result from plunging fire against the ship's thin deck armor rather than its well-protected sides.

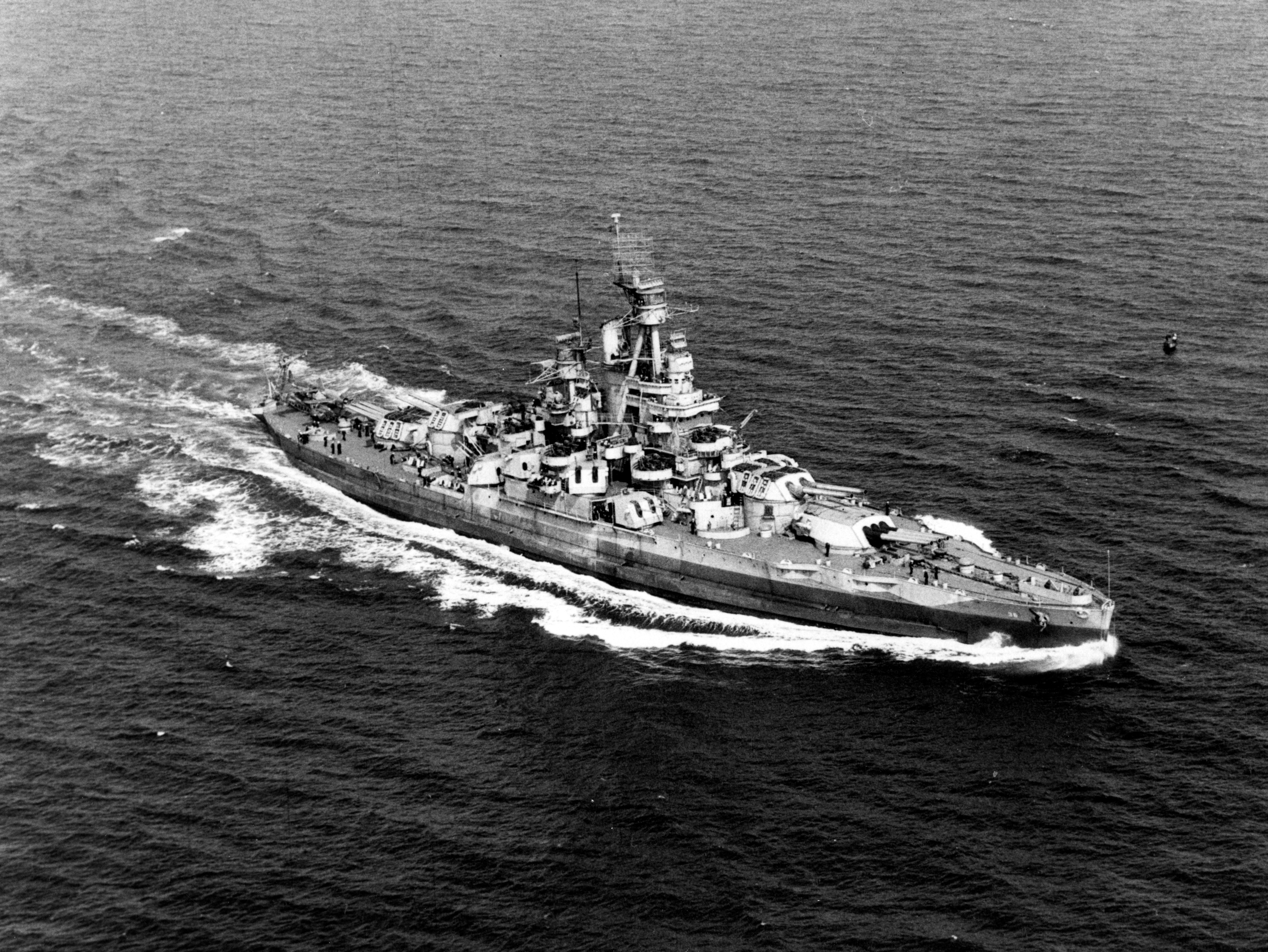
USS Nevada, the first US all-or-nothing battleship

Although the US Navy had begun work on the first all-or-nothing ship in 1911 with the Nevada, the Royal Navy did not believe that long-range gunnery would be important or that the ship's magazine spaces were vulnerable. However, experiences in the First World War, particularly the Battle of Jutland, showed that a ship could survive extensive damage as long as it was outside their magazine spaces, but any shell that breached the defenses of those spaces had catastrophic effects. The logical conclusion was that there was no point in having armor that could not stop a shell penetrating into the magazine spaces, and that any armor that did not contribute to this goal was wasted armor. The most important finding of the gunnery trials on SMS Baden was that the 7-inch (18 cm) thick medium armor was completely useless against large-caliber shells. As a result, the Royal Navy adopted in the Nelson class the "all or nothing" armor pioneered by the US Navy.

The end of World War I and the Washington Treaty put a temporary halt in the construction of new battleships. The hiatus was used to refine the protection for the next generation of battleships. At that time airplanes and aerial bombs began to make an impact on naval warfare. With the signing of the Washington Treaty the Allies had an excess of old battleships, especially from the former Imperial German Navy, which were expended in gunnery and bombing trials.

As a result of these experiments, armor-piercing ordnance employed against enemy battleships, shells fired by a battleship's main guns, and aerial bombs delivered by dive bombers would have delay-action fuses to explode only after penetrating into a ship's vitals. If on its way through the ship there was nothing to activate the fuse, then the shell or bomb could pass through the ship without detonating, or if it did detonate, the blast would be outside its armor. The ship would not sink unless its own magazines were penetrated; thus, the maximum thickness of armor would be around the magazine area, leading to the final manifestation of the ‘all or nothing’ scheme.

== In practice ==
No navy built pure "all or nothing" battleships, although most navies put the theory into use to some degree. Even Japan's giant Yamato class was armored along all-or-nothing principles, as there simply was no other way to provide the scale of protection they required. Of the battleships designed and built within the full constraints of the Washington Treaty, the Royal Navy's Nelson class and the French Navy's Dunkerque class came closest to the ideal. Even in these ships some degree of "splinter protection" was included to protect key systems and personnel from fragmentation damage.

From the Nevada class on to its Iowa class, the United States Navy pioneered the all or nothing approach without taking it to its logical conclusion. For example, the US designed its battleships to give the crew additional protection instead of relying only on the armored deck of the citadel. These vessels had three armored decks: a sacrificial armored top deck to decap and set off bombs and shells; a splinter deck between the top and citadel decks to protect the majority of the crew from shell and bomb fragments; and a heavy armor citadel deck protecting the machinery and magazines. On the Iowa-class ships, the splinter deck is below the citadel deck. In World War II-era fast battleships and modernized Standard-type battleships, the secondary armament was also in armored turrets, the same type of mounts also found in newer fleet carriers and cruisers, since this was a vital defense against enemy aircraft (particularly kamikazes). The US could also afford to construct large portions of their battleships using Special Treatment Steel (STS), a ductile armor which provided both structure and splinter protection.

The misgivings of building a pure "all or nothing" ship were that they had areas still vulnerable to guns of even modest warships, small arms fire, blast damage from a ship's own guns, bombs, strafing, and torpedoes. For instance, blast damage was to plague the careers of the Nelson-class ships, a situation aggravated by the positioning of their guns. The superstructure housed crucial command stations, communications, and radar equipment. Regardless of armoring scheme used, many critical areas such as the rudder, propellers, and bow could not be protected, so damage to these areas could reduce a ship's maneuverability and buoyancy. For example, Bismarck and Hiei were lost due to rudder damage; the relatively large and "soft" unarmored bow structures of Japanese superbattleships Yamato and Musashi proved to be their Achilles' heel as flooding there rendered them unstable and unmaneuverable long before they were actually in danger of sinking. The superstructure housing command facilities, communications, and radar also remained vulnerable; for example, Hiei was rendered ineffective by a saturation bombardment of small projectiles which set her superstructure afire, Tirpitz suffered extensive topside damage in Operation Tungsten, and USS South Dakota was forced to withdraw from a night battle when relatively superficial damage to her superstructure knocked out her radars, disrupted her already-compromised electrical systems, and killed 58 and wounded 60 crew members. The secondary batteries (including dual-purpose guns and heavy anti-aircraft guns) had less protection, being outside the main armor citadel, and the light anti-aircraft guns were on exposed mounts with little or no armor (especially the extra light anti-aircraft guns added in the 1944 refit of the Yamato class), so dive bombing and fighter strafing attacks on Tirpitz (Operation Tungsten), Musashi (Battle of Leyte Gulf), and Yamato (Operation Ten-Go) caused heavy casualties among anti-aircraft gunners. Such are the trade-offs with "all or nothing" armor, in that some vulnerabilities must be accepted in exchange for greater protection elsewhere.

== In action ==
The battleship fleet versus battleship fleet showdown that all sides had anticipated never came about, so the benefits of the all-or-nothing ship's design in such a battle were never fully tested.

However, at Pearl Harbor the resilience of the American Standard-type battleship to survive damage was demonstrated, though they would have been lost in open seas. Although all eight American battleships were hit and damaged and four were sunk, it was possible to return six of the ships back into service, due to being in shallow water. Arizona was lost due to a catastrophic explosion of her magazine spaces. Competing theories exist as to how this occurred, but ultimately no practical thickness of deck armor could protect any battleship from a vertical bombing attack.

Few battleship-to-battleship encounters took place in the Second World War. In the Atlantic these included the Battle of Mers-el-Kébir in July 1940, Battle of Dakar in September 1940, the Battle of the Denmark Strait and the last battle of the Bismarck in May 1941, the Battle of Casablanca in November 1942, and the Battle of North Cape in 1943. In the Pacific, there was the Second Naval Battle of Guadalcanal in November 1942 and the Battle of Surigao Strait in October 1944, part of the larger Battle of Leyte Gulf.

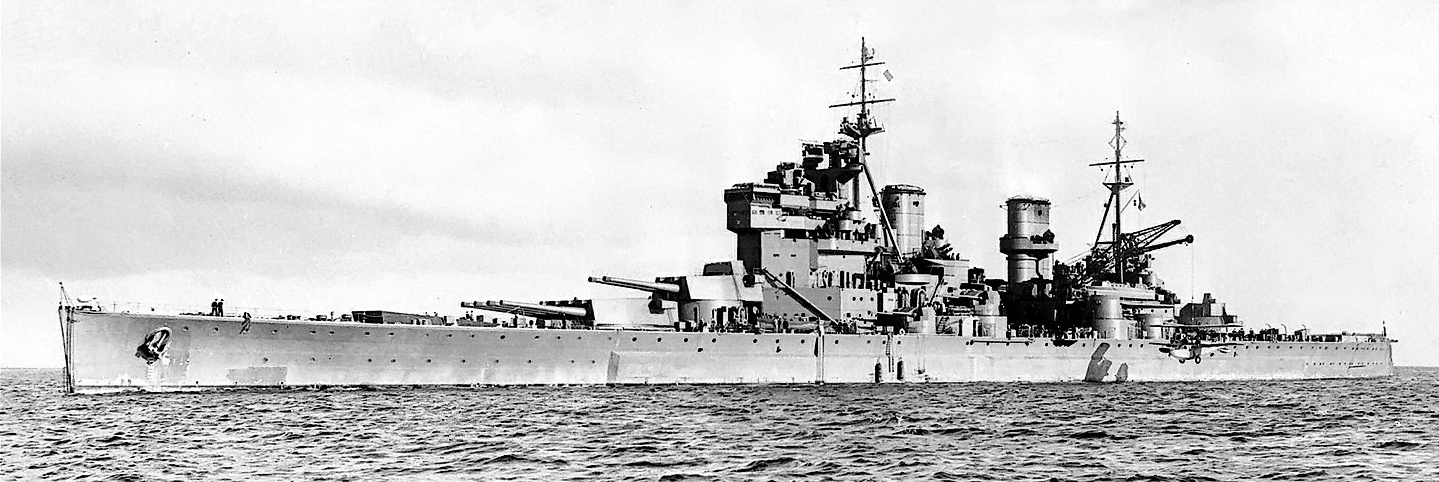
The Prince of Wales sustained several hits in the Battle of the Denmark Strait but was not in danger of sinking because most of the shells did not detonate.

In the Battle of the Denmark Strait, HMS Prince of Wales was hit repeatedly by 15 in (38 cm) AP shells, causing damage without seriously endangering the ship, however one 15-inch shell about a foot above the starboard bilge keel did not explode. An 8-inch shell from the cruiser Prinz Eugen penetrated on the starboard side of the stern below the waterline. Splinter damage from this hit caused some flooding in the interior. Another 8-inch shell eventually penetrated 5.25-inch gun P3's casemate but did not detonate. The fact that a cruiser shell could make its way in to those places shows a weakness of the "all or nothing" armor scheme. HMS Hood, built using the earlier concept of banded armor, was most likely lost when an AP shell from Bismarck passed through a thinner upper belt into her magazine, Though also built using the older banded armor design, vessels of the Kriegsmarine's Bismarck class proved difficult to sink, largely because they were well-built and highly compartmentalized. Bismarck withstood tremendous punishment during her last battle. Though an expedition verified that few if any British heavy shells penetrated the Bismarck's citadel, some main-turret barbettes were penetrated, and the ship was virtually destroyed above the armored deck by AP shells detonated by a medium thickness upper belt that did not prevent them from penetrating. Bismarck's sister ship Tirpitz suffered extensive topside damage from Royal Navy aerial strikes during Operation Tungsten but her vitals were relatively unharmed. Tirpitz was ultimately sunk by a high-altitude bombing attack involving massive Tallboy bombs that no practical amount of armor could have ameliorated. In particular, the Tallboy that hit amidships between the aircraft catapult and the funnel blew a very large hole into the ship's side and bottom while completely destroying the entire section of belt armor abreast of the bomb impact, which contributed to the battleship's rapid capsizing.

Another direct demonstration of the benefits—and the limits—of an all-or-nothing armoring scheme in comparison to banded armoring occurred in the Naval Battle of Guadalcanal. On the first night (13 November 1942) a US cruiser-destroyer formation charged directly through a superior Japanese force at point-blank range, unintentionally offsetting the advantage of the heavy Japanese battleship guns with their advantage in fire volume. Hiei, built using an incremental armoring scheme, was fatally damaged by fires caused by 8-inch AP shells from USS San Francisco that penetrated secondary battery casemates protected by a medium thickness upper belt similar to that used on Bismarck. As in Bismarck, the upper belt proved sufficient to detonate the projectiles but not sufficient to exclude them, and a fatal hit that disabled her steering gear allowed Hiei to be sunk by air attack the following day. On the second night, (14–15 November 1942) USS South Dakota was hit at close range by 27 common, HE, and AP shells of various calibers, most of which passed through her unarmored superstructure without detonating and caused relatively little damage. Both projectiles that struck South Dakota's armor shattered, including a 14 in (36 cm) armor-piercing round from the Japanese battleship Kirishima, which struck the heavily armored barbette of main battery turret III. No projectiles penetrated South Dakota's armor, and the ship's hull strength, buoyancy, stability, steering and propulsion were not materially affected. Though South Dakota was in no danger of sinking, she was put out of action by the damage the smaller-caliber fire wreaked upon her radars and electronic systems, which rendered her ineffective for night combat.

The Battle of Surigao Strait was the last battleship-versus-battleship encounter. Once the Japanese forces (after first being decimated by US destroyer torpedoes) reached the main US line, the deciding factor was the much greater numbers of the American force, plus their superior radar, so the armor schemes of US battleships were not tested.

== See also ==
- Pre-dreadnought protection
- N3-class battleship
- G3 battlecruiser
