= BL 6-inch Mk XXII naval gun =

British weapon

Ordnance BL 6-inch gun Mk XXII
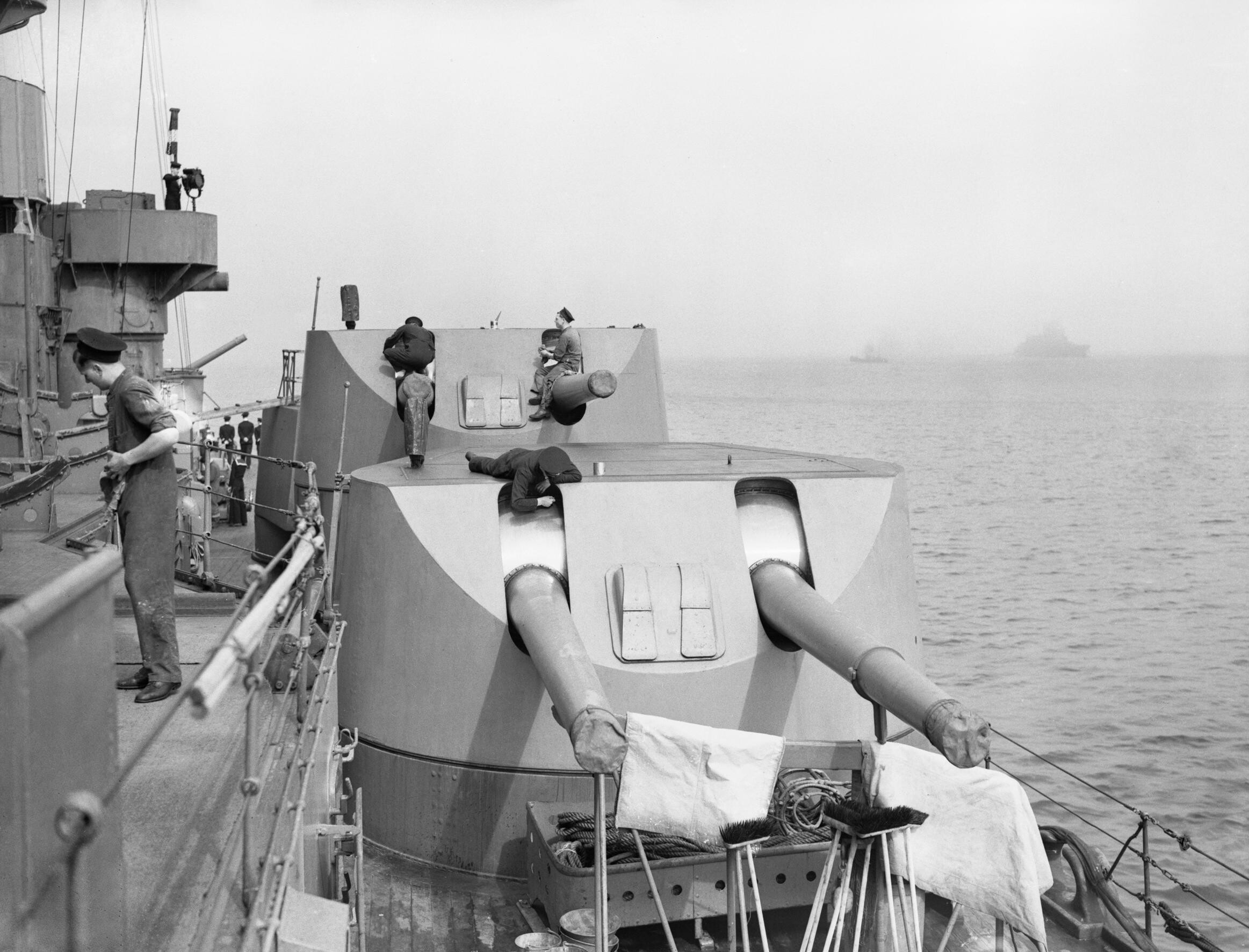
- Gun turrets on HMS Rodney, 1940
- Type: Naval gun
- Place of origin: United Kingdom

Service history
- In service: 1927 – 1947
- Used by: United Kingdom
- Wars: World War II

Production history
- Designed: 1921
- No. built: 40
- Variants: Mark XXII*

Specifications
- Mass: 19,824 lbs. (8,992 kg)
- Barrel length: 300 inches (7.620 m) bore (50 calibres)
- Shell: 1927 : 100 pounds (45 kg); 1942 : 112 pounds (51 kg)
- Calibre: 6-inch (152.4 mm)
- Breech: 364 lbs. (165.1 kg) Welin interrupted screw
- Recoil: 16.5 in (42 cm)
- Elevation: -5 / +60 degrees
- Traverse: +100 / -100 degrees
- Rate of fire: 5 rpm
- Muzzle velocity: 898 metres per second (2,950 ft/s)

The BL 6-inch Mk XXII gun (Note: MK XXII = Mark 22. Britain used Roman numerals to denote Marks (models) of ordnance until after World War II. This was the twenty-second model of British BL 6-inch gun) was a British high-velocity 6-inch 50-calibre wire-wound naval guns deployed on the Nelson-class battleships from the 1920s to 1945.

== Background ==
They were originally designed as secondary armament for the proposed G3 class battlecruisers. When the G3 class were cancelled after the Washington Naval Treaty the guns and mountings were later used as secondary armament on the two Nelson-class battleships, serving throughout World War II. The Nelsons were the first British battleships since the Lord Nelson class of 1904 to carry their secondary armament in turrets rather than in broadside casemates. The Mk VIII gun mountings could elevate from +60 degrees to -5 degrees, while the telescopic power rammers for the gun loaded at a +5-degree fixed angle. Although classified as a dual-purpose gun and capable of high-angle fire, their training and elevation speeds were too slow for the anti-aircraft role and their main use was against surface targets.

== Ammunition ==
The gun originally fired a 100-pound (45 kg) shell, which had been the standard shell weight for six-inch guns since 1880. From 1942 the gun fired the same 112-pound (51 kg) shell introduced for the later Mk XXIII gun. Figures in the table below are for the 100lb shell.

== Shell trajectory ==
Range	Elevation	Time of flight	Descent	Impact velocity
5000 yd (4.6 km)	2° 5.2′	6.20 sec	2° 48′	2029 ft/s (618 m/s)
10000 yd (9.1 km)	5° 37.2′	15.22 sec	9° 13′	1390 ft/s (424 m/s)
15000 yd (14 km)	12° 5.4′	28.55 sec	23° 2′	1094 ft/s (333 m/s)
20000 yd (18 km)	22° 54′	46.14 sec	39° 46′	1056 ft/s (322 m/s)
25000 yd (22.86 km)	42° 37′	74.92 sec	59° 0′	1148 ft/s (350 m/s)

== See also ==
=== Weapons of comparable role, performance and era ===
- 152 mm /53 Italian naval gun Models 1926 and 1929: approximate Italian equivalent deployed on light cruisers
- 6"/53 caliber gun: roughly equivalent US gun deployed on light cruisers

== Bibliography ==
- Campbell, John (1985). Naval Weapons of World War Two. Annapolis, Maryland: Naval Institute Press. ISBN 0-87021-459-4.
- Jordan, John (2020). "Warship Notes: The 6in Turrets of Nelson and Rodney". In Jordan, John (ed.). Warship 2020. Oxford, UK: Osprey. pp. 184–188. ISBN 978-1-4728-4071-4.
