= Admiral-class battlecruiser =

Class of Royal Navy battlecruisers

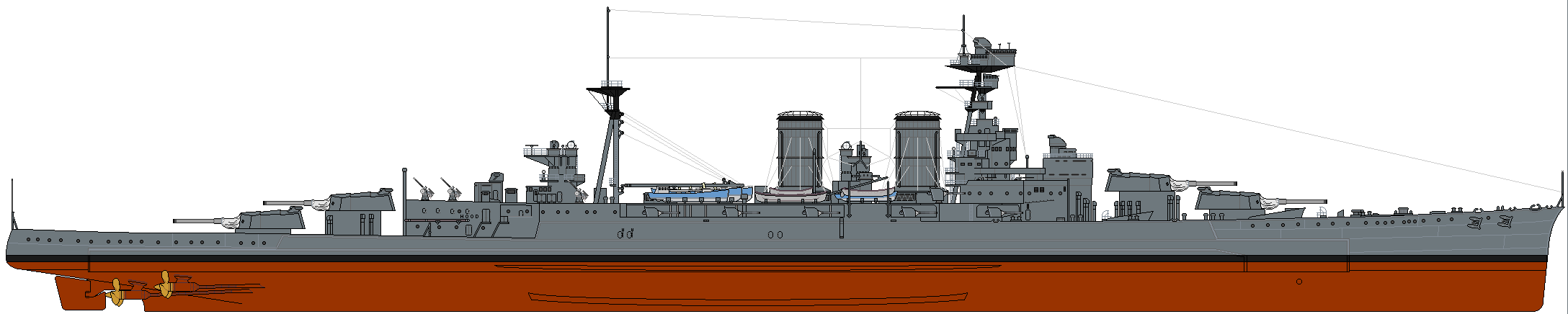
- HMS Hood as she was in 1921

Class overview
- Name: Admiral class
- Operators: Royal Navy
- Preceded by: Courageous class
- Succeeded by: G3 battlecruiser (cancelled)
- Built: 1916–1920
- In service: 1920–1941
- In commission: 1920–1941
- Planned: 4
- Completed: 1
- Canceled: 3
- Lost: 1

General characteristics (as of 20 August 1917)
- Type: Battlecruiser
- Displacement: 45,470 long tons (46,200 t) (deep load)
- Length: 860 ft (262.1 m)
- Beam: 104 ft (31.7 m)
- Draught: 31 ft 6 in (9.6 m)
- Installed power: 24 Yarrow boilers; 144,000 shp (107,000 kW)
- Propulsion: 4 shafts; 4 geared steam turbines
- Speed: 32 knots (59 km/h; 37 mph)
- Range: 7,500 nmi (13,900 km; 8,600 mi) at 14 knots (26 km/h; 16 mph)
- Complement: 820
- Armament: 4 × twin 15 in (380 mm) guns; 16 × single 5.5 in (140 mm) guns; 4 × single 4 in (102 mm) AA guns; 10 × 21 in (533 mm) torpedo tubes
- Armour: Belt: 5–12 in (127–305 mm); Decks: 1–5 in (25–127 mm); Barbettes: 12 in (305 mm); Turrets: 11–15 in (279–381 mm); Conning tower: 9–11 in (229–279 mm); Torpedo bulkheads: 0.75–1.5 in (19–38 mm)

The Admiral-class battlecruisers were to have been a class of four British Royal Navy battlecruisers built near the end of World War I. Their design began as an improved version of the Queen Elizabeth-class battleships, but it was recast as a battlecruiser after Admiral John Jellicoe, commander of the Grand Fleet, pointed out that there was no real need for more battleships, but that a number of German battlecruisers had been laid down that were superior to the bulk of the Grand Fleet's battlecruisers and the design was revised to counter these. The class was to have consisted of HMS Hood, Anson, Howe, and Rodney — all names of famous admirals — but the latter three ships were suspended as the material and labour required to complete them was needed for higher-priority merchantmen and escort vessels. Their designs were updated to incorporate the lessons from the Battle of Jutland, but the Admiralty eventually decided that it was better to begin again with a clean-slate design so they were cancelled in 1919. No more battlecruisers would be built due to the arms limitations agreements of the interbellum.

Hood, however, was sufficiently advanced in construction that she was completed in 1920 and immediately became flagship of the Battlecruiser Squadron of the Atlantic Fleet. She served as the flagship of the Special Service Squadron during its round-the-world cruise in 1923–1924. Hood was transferred to the Mediterranean Fleet in 1936 and spent much of the next few years on Non-Intervention Patrols during the Spanish Civil War, returning to the United Kingdom and the Battlecruiser Squadron of the Home Fleet before the beginning of World War II.

Hood spent most of the early part of the war patrolling against German commerce raiders and escorting convoys. Flagship of Force H, based at Gibraltar, she bombarded French ships during the attack on Mers-el-Kébir. In May 1941 Hood and the battleship Prince of Wales were ordered to intercept the German battleship Bismarck and the heavy cruiser Prinz Eugen as they attempted to break out into the North Atlantic. In the subsequent Battle of the Denmark Strait, the aft magazines of Hood exploded, sinking her within five minutes of opening fire.

== Design and description ==
In 1915 the Admiralty was considering the next generation of warship to follow the Queen Elizabeth-class battleships. The Director of Naval Construction (DNC), Sir Eustace Tennyson-d'Eyncourt, was given instructions to prepare designs for a new battleship. The design should: "take the armament, armour and engine power of Queen Elizabeth as the standard and build around them a hull which should draw as little water as was considered practicable and safe, and which should embody all the latest protection and improvements against underwater attack." The design ('A') was submitted to the Admiralty on 30 November for consideration. The DNC had been able to reduce the draught in comparison to Queen Elizabeth by 22% by widening the ship to 104 feet (31.7 m) and lengthening it to 810 feet (246.9 m); this had the consequence of restricting the ships to use only one dock in Rosyth and two in Portsmouth. Large anti-torpedo bulges were fitted, and the secondary armament of twelve 5-inch (127 mm) guns of a new design was mounted on the forecastle deck. The resulting high freeboard gave the design a greater ratio of reserve buoyancy to displacement than in any previous British dreadnought. The design's stretched hull form also gave her an estimated speed of 26.5 knots (49.1 km/h; 30.5 mph), about 2.5 knots (4.6 km/h; 2.9 mph) faster than Queen Elizabeth had been able to reach in service. The First Sea Lord, Admiral Sir Henry Jackson, responded on 6 December that such a large ship might start a new arms race with the Americans that Britain could ill afford, and that better deck protection was necessary to defeat plunging shells during long-range engagements.

The Admiralty asked for the design to be reworked ('B') with a maximum beam of 90 feet (27.4 m), but this was deemed unsatisfactory as it compromised the ship's underwater protection. A pair of revised designs was requested with the speed reduced to 22 knots (41 km/h; 25 mph) to allow the hull to be shortened to better fit in existing floating docks and the minimum possible draught. The first of the two ('C1') was to have full bulge protection and the second ('C2') to have the best bulge protection possible without exceeding Queen Elizabeth's length. 'C1' was shortened by 100 feet (30.5 m) in comparison with 'B' and 'C2' was only 610 feet (185.9 m) in length, but draught increased by 1 foot 3 inches (0.38 m). In both proposals it had been necessary to reduce the number of guns in the secondary armament and reduce the thickness of the armour. The Admiralty was not pleased with either design and asked for a revised version of 'A' of the same draught, beam, armour and armament, but shortened and with the same speed as Queen Elizabeth. In addition the new five-inch gun was rejected in favour of the existing 5.5-inch (140 mm) gun.

At least some of the designs were passed to Admiral John Jellicoe, commander of the Grand Fleet, who pointed out that there was no need for new battleships as the British superiority in numbers over the Germans was substantial, but that was not true for battlecruisers. Germany was known to be building three new Mackensen-class battlecruisers with an estimated speed approaching 30 knots (56 km/h; 35 mph) and a reported armament of 15.2-inch (386 mm) guns. (Note: These reports were incorrect; the German ships were designed for 28 knots (52 km/h; 32 mph) and 35-centimetre (13.8 in) guns. In addition there were four, not three ships in the class. See Campbell, pp. 58–59.) These ships would be superior to all existing British battlecruisers, and those then under construction (the two Renown-class and the three Courageous-class 'large light cruisers') were equally fast, but too thinly armoured to compete with them. He also remarked that his experience with Queen Elizabeth-class had persuaded him that an intermediate speed between the battleships and the battlecruisers was of little use; he suggested that the design should be for either a 21-knot (39 km/h; 24 mph) battleship or a 30-knot battlecruiser, preferably the latter.

The DNC prepared two new designs in response to Admiral Jellicoe's comments on 1 February 1916, each for a battlecruiser capable of thirty knots or better and armed with eight 15-inch (381 mm) guns. Design '1' displaced 39,000 long tons (39,626 t) with two inches less belt armour and a speed of thirty knots. It used the bulky large-tube boilers traditional in British capital ships, which explains why the design was 9,000 long tons (9,144 t) larger than any of the previous battleship designs. Design '2' was essentially a repeat of the first design except that small-tube boilers were substituted. These were considerably smaller than the older type and saved 3,500 long tons (3,556 t) over Design '1' and had one foot less draught. These savings were substantial enough to overcome the Engineer-in-Chief's objections that they required more frequent and expensive repairs. The DNC was asked to submit four more designs using small-tube boilers which were submitted on 17 February. Design '3' was Design '2' with the machinery power increased to 160,000 shaft horsepower (120,000 kW) to boost the maximum speed to 32 knots (59 km/h; 37 mph) while the other designs had either four, six or eight 18-inch (457 mm) guns. Design '3' was selected as Admiral Jellicoe had specified that the minimum number of guns should be no less than eight as fewer caused problems in accurate fire control, and two alternatives were to be provided, one with a dozen 5.5-inch guns and the other with sixteen such guns. The latter proposal was selected on 7 April and orders were placed on 19 April for three ships (Hood, Howe and Rodney). The order for the fourth ship, Anson, was placed on 13 June.

Hood was laid down on 31 May 1916, the same day as the Battle of Jutland. The loss of three British battlecruisers during that battle caused the work on all three ships to be suspended pending an investigation into possible design flaws. Admiral Jellicoe's investigation blamed the loss of the ships on faulty cordite handling procedures that allowed fires in the turrets or hoists to reach the ships' magazines. It recommended anti-flash equipment be installed in magazines and handling rooms and the improvement of deck armour over the magazines to prevent plunging shells or fragments from reaching the magazines. The DNC and the Third Sea Lord opposed the latter, believing that there was no direct evidence that the magazines had been directly penetrated.

On 5 July the DNC submitted two revised designs for the Admiral-class ships. The first was a modification of the previous design with slight increases to the deck, turret, barbette, and funnel uptake armour, one-inch protection for the 5.5-inch ammunition hatches and hoists, and the number of electrical generators increased from four to eight. These changes increased the displacement by 1,250 long tons (1,270 t) and draught by 9 inches (228.6 mm). The second design drastically improved the protection and converted the ships into fast battleships. The vertical armour was generally increased by 50% and the deck protection was slightly thickened as in the first design. These changes would have added another 4,300 long tons (4,369 t) to the original design and increased the draught by 2 feet (0.6 m), but would have cost half a knot in speed. This design would have been equal to the Queen Elizabeths, but 7 knots (13 km/h; 8.1 mph) faster and with much improved torpedo protection, although it was some 13,000 long tons (13,209 t) larger than the older ships. After the DNC submitted the above designs, he was asked to consider variations with triple fifteen-inch turrets, and these were submitted on 20 July. The Admiralty chose the fast battleship design, and Hood was laid down again on 1 September.

Later that month Hood's armour scheme was slightly revised in light of further analysis of the results of Jutland and the deck armour was modestly increased in order to ensure that a minimum thickness of nine inches of armour would have to be penetrated by shells striking at angles of descent up to 30° from the horizontal. Further alterations were made in 1917 during her construction that increased the thickness of her turret faces and roofs. These changes, plus numerous others, increased her displacement by 600 long tons (610 t) and her draught by 3 inches (76.2 mm), and reduced her speed to 31 knots (57 km/h; 36 mph). The changes continued during 1918 when the thickness of her magazine crowns was increased from one inch to two; the armour for the funnel uptakes above the forecastle deck was omitted in compensation. In May 1919 her main deck armour at the side abreast the magazines was increased to three inches (76 mm), and four 5.5-inch guns and their ammunition were deleted in consequence. The next month plans were approved to increase the thickness of the main deck over the forward magazines to 5 inches (127 mm) and to 6 inches (152 mm) over the rear magazines; her four above water torpedo tubes and their protection were to be omitted and the wall of the torpedo control tower were to be reduced to a thickness of 1.5 inches (38.1 mm) to offset the armour's weight. However, the additional deck armour was never fitted and the torpedo tubes (less their protection) were retained.

Earlier in 1917, however, construction of Hood's three sisters had been suspended as the amount of labour and material they required would be better employed in the construction and repair of merchant ships and escorts needed to keep open Britain's lines of communication in the face of the U-boat blockade. Design work continued however, although Hood was too far advanced to incorporate these changes, and ultimately would have been extensive enough for the other three ships to constitute their own class. At the end of 1917 the suspended ships' design was modified to increase the thickness of the turret roofs to six inches (152 mm), and (unspecified) alterations were made to the armoured bulkheads. These cost a total of 267 long tons (271 t) in displacement. Other changes were a redesigned bridge structure and moving the funnels closer together and the exchange in position between the fifteen-inch shellrooms and magazines. This latter change would have caused the hull's form to be filled out somewhat to accommodate the handling room of the rearmost turret at the cost of a slight loss in speed and ammunition storage.

Hood was the closest to completion and her construction was continued in case the Germans managed to complete any of their new battlecruisers. Admiral Beatty continually pressed to have Hood's construction expedited and for her sisters to be restarted, but the War Cabinet refused to approve either measure as nothing could be sacrificed in the shipbuilding programme to this end. After the end of the war the three suspended ships were cancelled as they could not fully incorporate the lessons of the war.

=== General characteristics ===
The Admiral-class ships were significantly larger than their predecessors of the Renown class. They had an overall length of 860 feet (262.1 m), a beam of 104 feet (31.7 m), and a draught of 31 feet 6 inches (9.6 m) at deep load. This was 64 feet (19.5 m) longer and 14 feet (4.3 m) wider than the smaller ships. They displaced 41,200 long tons (41,861 t) at load and 45,620 long tons (46,352 t) at deep load, over 13,000 long tons (13,210 t) more than the older ships. They had a metacentric height of 4.6 feet (1.4 m) at deep load as well as a complete double bottom.

=== Propulsion ===
The ships had four Brown-Curtis single-reduction geared steam turbine sets, each of which drove one propeller shaft. They were arranged in three engine rooms. The forward engine room held the two turbines for the wing shafts, the middle compartment housed the turbines for the port inner shaft and the aft engine room contained the turbines for the starboard inner shaft. A cruising turbine was built into the casing of each wing turbine. The turbines were powered by twenty-four Yarrow small-tube boilers equally divided between four boiler rooms. They were designed to produce a total of 144,000 shaft horsepower (107,000 kW) at a working pressure of 235 psi (1,620 kPa), but achieved more than 151,000 shp (112,601 kW) during Hood's trials, when she slightly exceeded her designed speed of 31 knots (57 km/h; 36 mph).

They were designed to normally carry 1,200 long tons (1,219 t) of fuel oil, but had a maximum capacity of 4,000 long tons (4,064 t). At full capacity, Hood could steam at a speed of 14 knots (26 km/h; 16 mph) for an estimated 7,500 nautical miles (13,890 km; 8,630 mi). They had eight 175-kilowatt (235 hp) dynamos, two diesel, two turbo-driven, and four reciprocating.

=== Armament ===
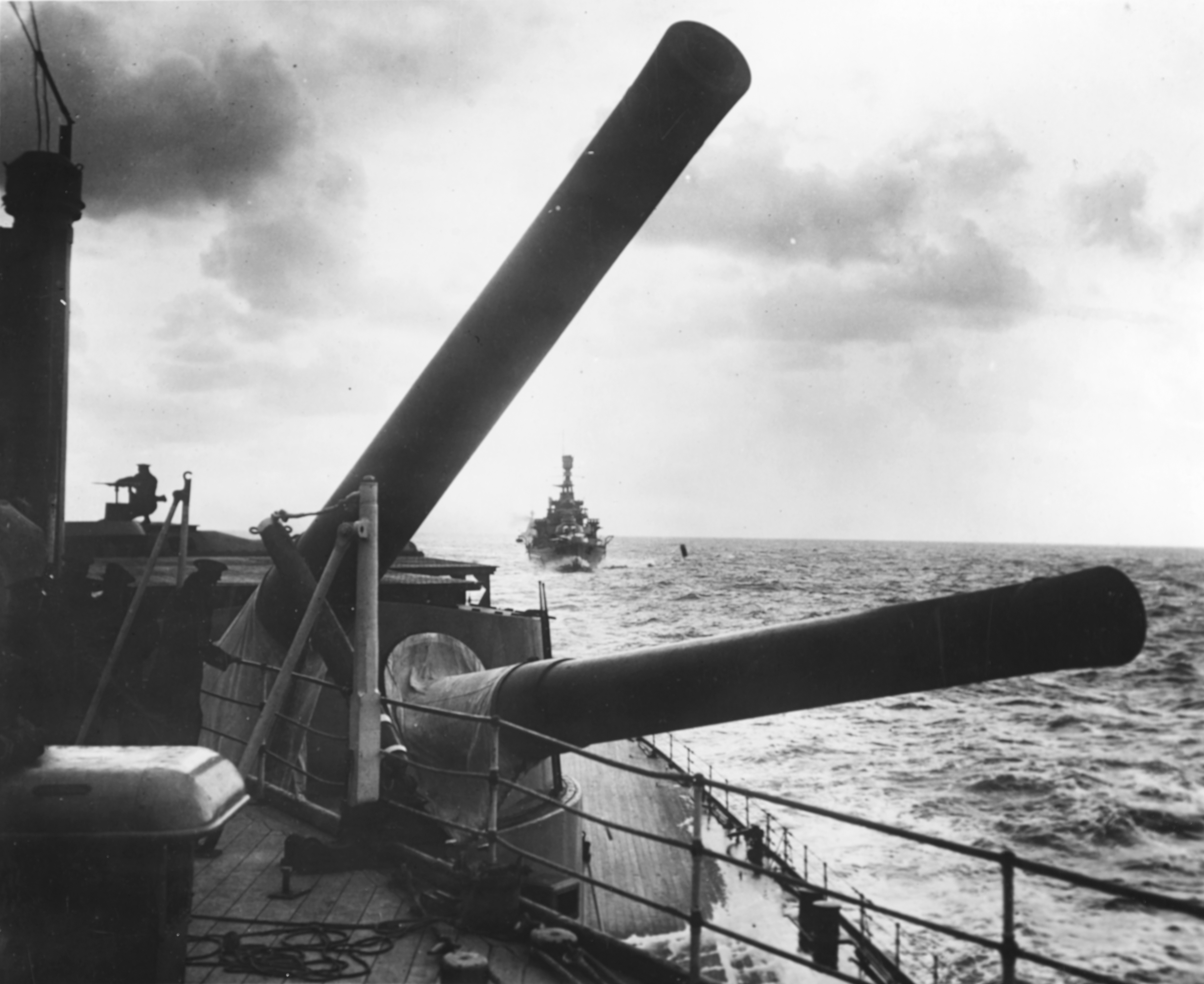
Close-up of Hood's aft 15-inch Mark I guns in 1926. HMS Repulse is in the background.

The Admiral-class ships mounted eight BL 15-inch Mk I guns in four twin hydraulically powered Mark II turrets, designated 'A', 'B', 'X' and 'Y' from front to rear. The guns could be depressed to −3° and elevated to 30°; they could be loaded at any angle up to 20°, although loading at high angles tended to slow the gun's return to battery. The ships carried 120 shells per gun. They fired 1,920-pound (871 kg) projectiles at a muzzle velocity of 2,467 ft/s (752 m/s); this provided a maximum range of 29,000 yd (26,518 m) with armour-piercing (AP) shells.

Their secondary armament consisted of sixteen BL 5.5-inch Mk I guns, which were mounted on pivot mounts on the forecastle deck, protected by gun shields. They were provided with 200 rounds per gun. The guns on their CPII mounts had a maximum elevation of 30°. They fired 82-pound (37 kg) projectiles at a muzzle velocity of 2,790 ft/s (850 m/s). Their maximum range was 17,700 yd (16,200 m) at 30° elevation. Their rate of fire was twelve rounds per minute.

The Admiral-class ships were designed with four QF four-inch Mark V anti-aircraft guns. They had a maximum depression of -5° and a maximum elevation of 80°. They fired a 31-pound (14 kg) high explosive shell at a muzzle velocity of 2,387 ft/s (728 m/s) at a rate of ten to fifteen rounds per minute. The guns had a maximum ceiling of 31,000 ft (9,400 m), but an effective range of much less.

Two 21-inch (533 mm) submerged side-loading torpedo tubes were fitted forward of 'A' turret and eight above-water side-loading Mark V tubes were intended to be mounted abreast the rear funnel on the upper deck, although only four of the latter were carried by Hood. They were loaded and traversed by hydraulic power; the submerged tubes were fired by compressed air while the above-water tubes used cordite charges. Thirty-two warheads could be accommodated in the two magazines in the hold forward of 'A' turret's shellroom. Hood carried Mark IV and IV* torpedoes, each which had a warhead of 515 pounds (234 kg) of TNT. They had three speed settings which governed their range; from 8,000 yards (7,315 m) at 35 knots (65 km/h; 40 mph), 10,000 yards (9,144 m) at 29 knots (54 km/h; 33 mph), and 13,500 yards (12,344 m) at 25 knots (46 km/h; 29 mph).

=== Fire-control ===
The main guns of the Admiral-class ships were controlled from either of the two fire-control directors. The primary director was mounted above the conning tower in an armoured hood and the other was in the fore-top on the foremast. 'B' turret could also control all the main gun turrets while 'X' turret could control the rear guns. Data from a 30-foot (9.1 m) rangefinder in the armoured hood were input into a Mk V Dreyer Fire Control Table located in the Transmitting Station (TS) on the platform deck where they were converted into range and deflection data for use by the guns. The target's data were also graphically recorded on a plotting table to assist the gunnery officer in predicting the movement of the target. The fore-top was equipped with a 15-foot (4.6 m) rangefinder. Each turret was provided with a thirty-foot rangefinder in an armoured housing on the turret roof and a Dumaresq analogue computer for local fire-control.

The secondary armament was primarily controlled by the 5.5-inch directors mounted on each side of the bridge. They were supplemented by the two additional control positions in the fore-top, which were provided with 9-foot (2.7 m) rangefinders. Each of these positions was equipped with a Dumaresq calculator for local control, but the spotting data were normally sent to the 5.5-inch TS on the lower deck much like the procedure for the fifteen-inch guns, except that the firing data were calculated by two Type F fire-control clocks (analog computers). The anti-aircraft guns were controlled by a simple 2-metre (6 ft 7 in) rangefinder mounted on the aft superstructure.

The torpedoes initially had a similar system where various rangefinders, especially the fifteen-foot rangefinder above the aft torpedo control tower, and deflection sights provided data to a Dreyer table in the torpedo TS adjacent to the 5.5-inch TS on the lower deck. However the Dreyer table was removed during Hood's 1929–1931 refit and the calculations were made in the torpedo control position in the bridge.

=== Armour ===
The waterline belt of the Admiral-class ships was 12 inches (305 mm) thick, angled 12° outwards partly to keep the belt inside the bulge structure and allow torpedo hits to vent to the atmosphere. This angle also increased the armour's relative thickness to horizontal, close-range fire, albeit at the cost of reducing its relative height which increased the chance of plunging shellfire going over or under it. This sloped belt made their armour comparable to the 13 inches (330 mm) found in the latest British dreadnoughts. It ran some 562 feet (171.3 m), from the forward edge of 'A' barbette to the middle of 'Y' barbette. Forward of this the belt thinned to six inches before further reducing to 5 inches (127 mm) and ending in a five-inch (127 mm) bulkhead well short of the bow. Aft of the midships section the belt reduced to six inches (152 mm); it did not reach the stern, but terminated at a five-inch bulkhead. This belt had a height of 9 feet 6 inches (2.9 m), which 4 feet (1.2 m) was below the designed waterline. Above it was the seven-inch middle belt, 7 feet (2.1 m) high, and the five-inch upper belt, which was 9 feet (2.7 m) high. The middle belt stretched between 'A' and 'Y' barbettes, ending in four-inch transverse bulkheads at each end. The upper belt only ran from 'A' barbette to the end of the machinery spaces and ended in another four-inch transverse bulkhead. Five of Hood's decks were armoured with thicknesses varying from .75 to 3 inches (19 to 76 mm), with the greatest thicknesses over the magazines and the steering gear. Immediately adjacent to 'A' and 'Y' barbettes the main deck was five inches thick to protect the magazines.

The turret faces were fifteen inches thick while their sides ranged from 11 to 12 inches (279 to 305 mm) in thickness, and the roof was five inches thick. The barbettes had a maximum of twelve inches of armour, but were reduced in thickness in stages below decks, although the outer faces of 'A' and 'Y' barbettes were considerably thicker below decks than the other barbettes. The conning tower armour was nine to eleven inches thick, and it was the largest yet fitted to a British capital ship as it weighed 600 long tons (610 t). The primary fire-control director atop the conning tower was protected by an armoured hood. The face of the hood was six inches thick, its sides were two inches thick, and its roof was protected by three inches of armour. A communications tube with six-inch sides ran from the conning tower down to the lower conning position on the main deck. The three torpedo bulkheads were 1.5 inches (38 mm), 1 inch (25 mm) and .75 inches (19 mm) thick.

The anti-torpedo bulges of the Admiral-class battlecruisers were the first fitted on a British capital ship to fully incorporate the lessons learned from a series of experiments begun before World War I. They consisted of an outer air space, an inner buoyancy space and the 1.5-inch protective bulkhead. The buoyancy space was filled with sealed steel crushing tubes intended to distribute the force of an explosion over as wide an area as possible as well as absorb as much of its force as possible. However, tests conducted after Hood was completed showed that filling the buoyancy space with water was equally effective and considerably cheaper.

== Ships ==
Construction data
| Ship | Builder | Namesake | Laid down | Launched | Completed | Fate |
|---|---|---|---|---|---|---|
| Hood | John Brown, Clydebank | Admiral Samuel Hood, 1st Viscount Hood | 1 September 1916 | 22 August 1918 | 15 May 1920 | Sunk in surface action, 24 May 1941 |
| Anson | Armstrong Whitworth, Elswick | Admiral of the Fleet George Anson, 1st Baron Anson | 9 November 1916 | —N/a | —N/a | Suspended 9 March 1917; cancelled 27 February 1919 |
| Howe | Cammell Laird, Birkenhead | Admiral of the Fleet Richard Howe, 1st Earl Howe | 16 October 1916 | —N/a | —N/a | Suspended 9 March 1917; cancelled 27 February 1919 |
| Rodney | Fairfield, Govan | Admiral George Brydges Rodney, 1st Baron Rodney | 9 October 1916 | —N/a | —N/a | Suspended 9 March 1917; cancelled 27 February 1919 |

== Service history ==
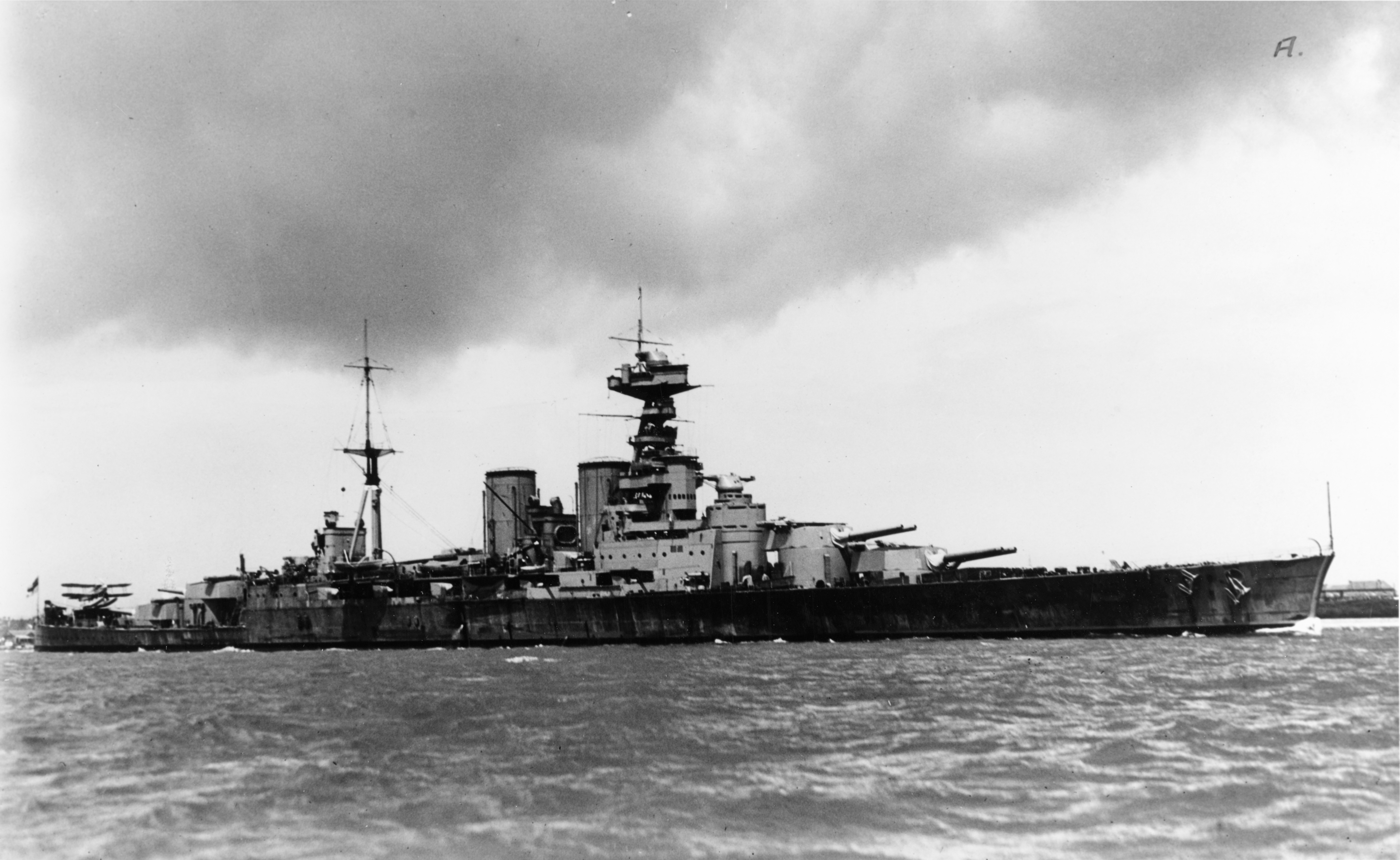
HMS Hood in 1932

Shortly after commissioning on 15 May 1920 Hood became flagship of the Battlecruiser Squadron of the Atlantic Fleet, under the command of Rear Admiral Sir Roger Keyes. She made a cruise to Scandinavian waters that year. She visited the Mediterranean in 1921 and 1922 to show the flag and to train with the Mediterranean Fleet, before sailing on a cruise to Brazil and the West Indies in company with the Battlecruiser Squadron.

In November 1923 Hood, accompanied by the battlecruiser Repulse and a number of Danae-class cruisers of the 1st Light Cruiser Squadron, set out on a world cruise from west to east via the Panama Canal. They returned home ten months later in September 1924. The Battlecruiser Squadron visited Lisbon in January 1925 to participate in the Vasco da Gama celebrations before continuing on the Mediterranean for exercises. Hood would continue this pattern of a winter training visit to the Mediterranean for the rest of the decade.

Hood was given a major refit from 1 May 1929 to 10 March 1931 and afterwards resumed her role as flagship of the Battlecruiser Squadron. Later that year her crew participated in the Invergordon Mutiny over pay cuts for the sailors. It ended peacefully and Hood returned to her home port afterwards. The Battlecruiser Squadron made a Caribbean cruise in early 1932. The next year she resumed her previous practice of a winter cruise in the Mediterranean. While en route to Gibraltar for one of these cruises she collided with the battlecruiser Renown on 23 January 1935, but was only lightly damaged. Hood participated in King George V's Silver Jublilee Fleet Review at Spithead the following August. She was transferred to the Mediterranean Fleet shortly afterward and stationed at Gibraltar at the outbreak of the Second Italo-Abyssinian War and the Spanish Civil War. On 23 April 1937 she escorted three British merchantmen into Bilbao harbour despite the presence of the Nationalist cruiser Almirante Cervera that attempted to blockade the port. She returned to Portsmouth in January 1939 for an overhaul that lasted until 12 August.

=== World War II ===
In June 1939, Hood was assigned to the Home Fleet's Battlecruiser Squadron while still refitting; when war broke out later that year, she was employed principally in patrolling the vicinity of Iceland and the Faroe Islands to protect convoys and intercept German raiders attempting to break out into the Atlantic. In September 1939, she was hit by a 250 kg (550 lb) aircraft bomb with minor damage. By early 1940 Hood's machinery was in dire shape and limited her best speed to 26.5 knots (49.1 km/h; 30.5 mph); she was refitted between 4 April and 12 June.

Hood and the aircraft carrier Ark Royal were ordered to Gibraltar to join Force H on 18 June where Hood would become the flagship. As such, she took part in the destruction of the French Fleet at Mers-el-Kebir in July 1940. Just eight days after the French surrender, the British Admiralty had issued an ultimatum to the French Fleet at Oran to ensure they would not fall into German or Italian hands. The terms were rejected and the Royal Navy opened fire on the French ships berthed there. The results of Hood's fire are not known exactly, but she damaged the French battleship Dunkerque, which was hit by four fifteen-inch shells and was forced to beach herself. Hood was straddled during the engagement by Dunkerque; shell splinters wounded two men. Dunkerque's sister ship Strasbourg managed to escape from the harbour and Hood with several light cruisers gave chase, but gave up after two hours after Hood had dodged a salvo of torpedoes from a French sloop and she had stripped a turbine reaching 28 knots (52 km/h; 32 mph).

Hood was relieved as flagship of Force H by Renown on 10 August after returning to Scapa Flow. After a short refit she resumed her previous role in patrolling against German commerce raiders and convoy escort. This lasted until January 1941 when she began a refit that lasted until March. Upon its completion she was ordered to sea in an attempt to intercept the German battleships Gneisenau and Scharnhorst. Unsuccessful, she was ordered to patrol the Bay of Biscay against any breakout attempt by the German ships from Brest. Hood was ordered to the Norwegian Sea on 19 April when the Admiralty received a false report that Bismarck had sailed from Germany. Afterwards she patrolled the North Atlantic before putting into Scapa Flow on 6 May.

==== Battle of the Denmark Strait ====
On the evening of 21 May 1941, Hood and the newly completed battleship Prince of Wales sailed from Scapa Flow to join the heavy cruisers Norfolk and Suffolk patrolling the Denmark Strait between Greenland and Iceland on the news that Bismarck and the heavy cruiser Prinz Eugen had sortied into the North Atlantic. They had not yet reached the Strait when Suffolk spotted the German ships north of Iceland in the early evening on 23 May. Hood and Prince of Wales altered course and increased their speed to intercept. The British squadron spotted the Germans at 05:37 but the Germans were already aware of their presence. The British opened fire at 05:52 with Hood engaging Prinz Eugen, the lead ship in the German formation, and the Germans returned fire 05:55, both ships concentrating on Hood. Prinz Eugen (probably) was the first ship to score when a shell hit Hood's boat deck, between her funnels, and started a large fire among the ready-use ammunition for the anti-aircraft guns and rockets of the Unrotated Projectile mounts. Right before 06:00, while Hood was turning 20° to port to unmask her rear turrets, she was hit again on the boat deck by a shell from Bismarck's fifth salvo. The exact location and sequence of events is unknown, but her aft fifteen-inch magazines exploded. This broke her back and she sank with the loss of all but three of her crew.
