= HMS Royal Sovereign (05) =

1916 Revenge-class battleship of the Royal Navy

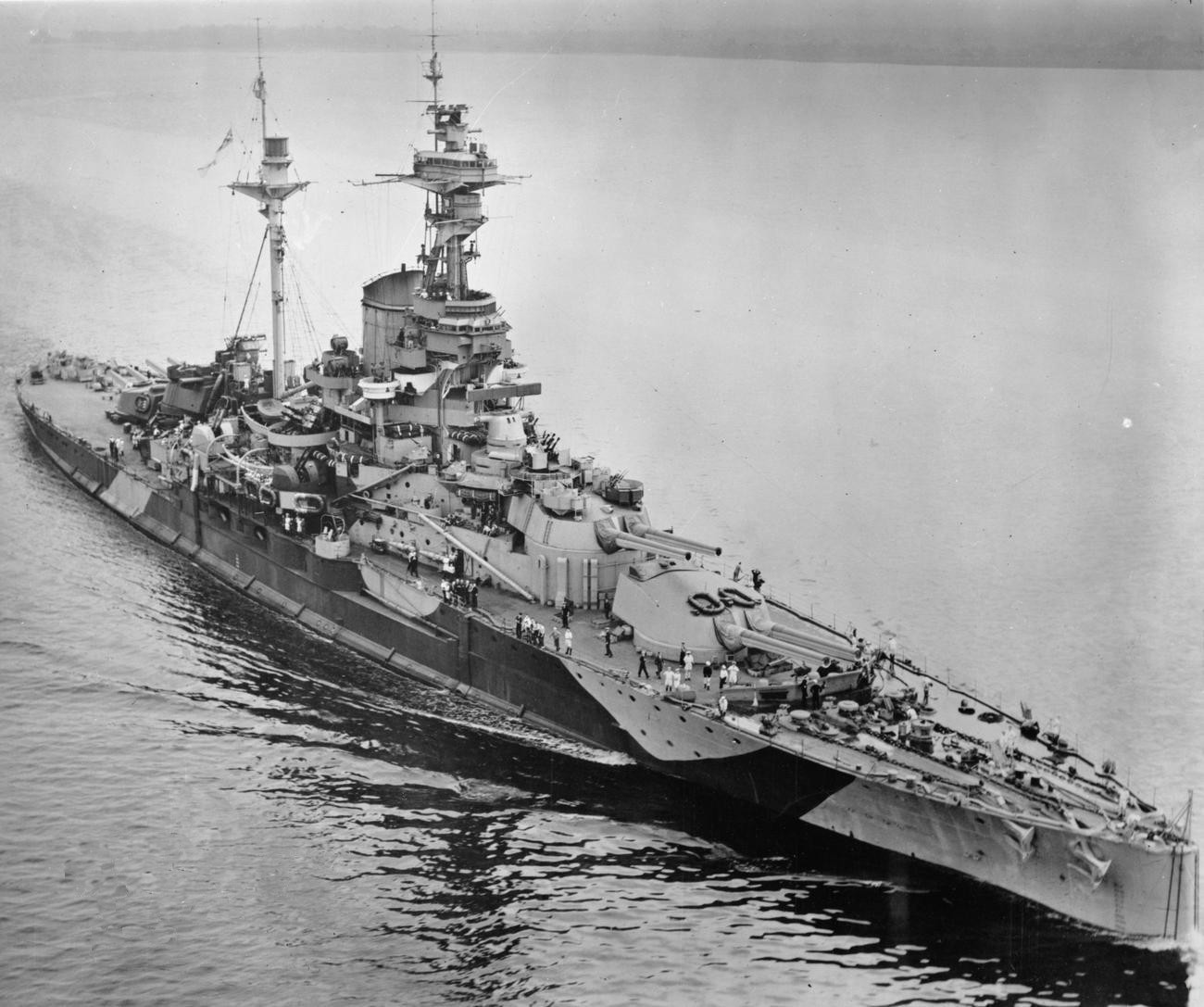
- Royal Sovereign at Philadelphia, September 1943

History

United Kingdom
- Name: Royal Sovereign
- Builder: HM Dockyard, Portsmouth
- Cost: £2,570,504
- Laid down: 15 January 1914
- Launched: 29 April 1915
- Completed: May 1916
- Out of service: Transferred to the Soviet Navy, 30 May 1944
- Identification: Pennant number: 05

Soviet Union
- Commissioned: 30 May 1944
- Renamed: Arkhangelsk
- Fate: Returned to the Royal Navy, January 1949

United Kingdom
- Acquired: January 1949
- Renamed: Royal Sovereign
- Fate: Scrapped, 18 May 1949

General characteristics (as built)
- Class & type: Revenge-class battleship
- Displacement: 29,970 long tons (30,451 t) (normal); 31,130 long tons (31,630 t) (deep load)
- Length: 620 ft 7 in (189.2 m)
- Beam: 88 ft 6 in (27.0 m)
- Draught: 33 ft 7 in (10.2 m) (deep load)
- Installed power: 40,000 shp (30,000 kW); 18 Babcock & Wilcox boilers
- Propulsion: 4 shafts; 4 steam turbines
- Speed: 21 knots (39 km/h; 24 mph)
- Range: 7,000 nmi (13,000 km; 8,100 mi) at 10 knots (19 km/h; 12 mph)
- Crew: 1,240 (1921)
- Armament: 4 × twin 15-inch (381 mm) guns; 14 × single 6-inch (152 mm) guns; 2 × single 3-inch (76 mm) AA guns; 4 × single 47 mm (1.9 in) 3-pdr guns; 4 × 21-inch (533 mm) torpedo tubes
- Armour: Waterline belt: 13 in (330 mm); Deck: 1–4 in (25–102 mm); Barbettes: 6–10 in (152–254 mm); Gun turrets: 11–13 in (279–330 mm); Conning tower: 3–11 in (76–279 mm); Bulkheads: 6 in (152 mm)

HMS Royal Sovereign (pennant number 05) was a Revenge-class (also known as Royal Sovereign and R-class) battleship of the Royal Navy displacing 29,970 long tons (30,451 t) and armed with eight 15-inch (381 mm) guns in four twin-gun turrets. She was laid down in January 1914 and launched in April 1915; she was completed in May 1916, but was not ready for service in time to participate in the Battle of Jutland at the end of the month. She served with the Grand Fleet for the remainder of the First World War, but did not see action. In the early 1930s, she was assigned to the Mediterranean Fleet and based in Malta.

Unlike the Queen Elizabeth-class battleships, Royal Sovereign and her sisters were not modernised during the interwar period. Only minor alterations to her anti-aircraft battery were effected before the outbreak of the Second World War in September 1939. Assigned to the Home Fleet, the ship was tasked with convoy protection until May 1940, when she returned to the Mediterranean Fleet. Royal Sovereign was present during the Battle of Calabria in July 1940, but her slow speed prevented her from engaging the Italian battleships. By March 1942, she was assigned to the Eastern Fleet in the Indian Ocean, but after the Indian Ocean raid by Admiral Nagumo's Kido Butai, the ship was withdrawn to eastern Africa to escort convoys. In January 1944, she returned to Britain, and in May the Royal Navy transferred Royal Sovereign to the Soviet Navy, which renamed her Arkhangelsk. She then escorted Arctic convoys into Kola until the end of the war. The Soviets returned the ship in 1949, after which she was broken up for scrap.

== Description ==
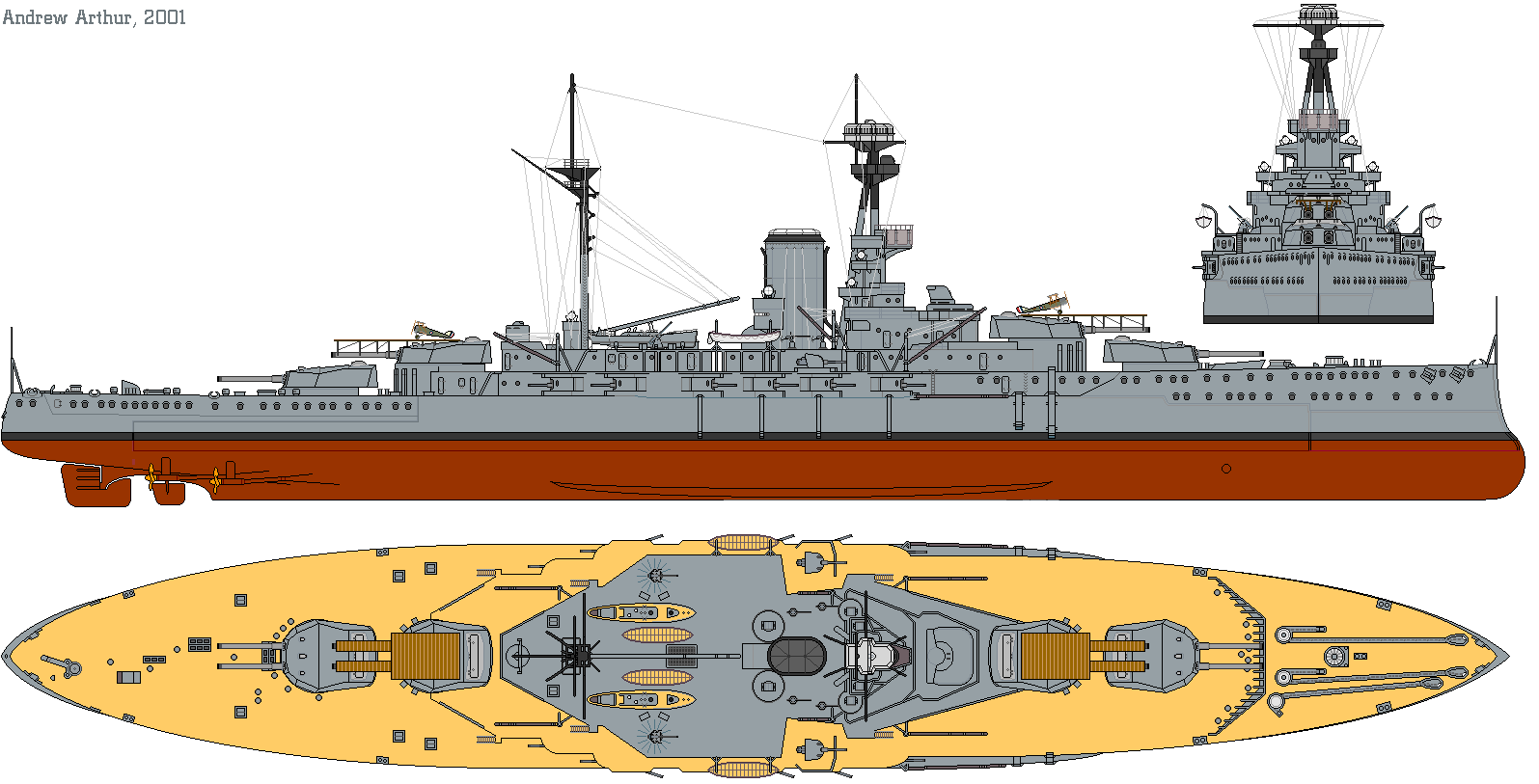
Illustration of HMS Revenge as she appeared in 1916

Royal Sovereign had a length overall of 620 feet 7 inches (189.2 m), a beam of 88 feet 6 inches (27.0 m) and a deep draught of 33 feet 7 inches (10 m). She had a designed displacement of 27,790 long tons (28,236 t) and displaced 31,130 long tons (31,630 t) at deep load. She was powered by four Parsons steam turbines using steam from eighteen oil-fired Babcock & Wilcox boilers. The turbines were rated at 40,000 shaft horsepower (29,828 kW) and a top speed of 21 knots (38.9 km/h; 24.2 mph). She had a range of 7,000 nautical miles (12,964 km; 8,055 mi) at a cruising speed of 10 knots (18.5 km/h; 11.5 mph). Her crew numbered 1,240 officers and ratings in 1921. Royal Sovereign cost £2,570,504 upon completion.

=== Armament ===
The ship was equipped with eight breech-loading (BL) 15-inch (381 mm) Mk I guns in four twin gun turrets, in two superfiring pairs fore and aft of the superstructure, designated 'A', 'B', 'X', and 'Y' from front to rear. Twelve of the fourteen BL 6-inch (152 mm) Mk XII guns were mounted in casemates along the broadside of the vessel amidships; the remaining pair were mounted on the shelter deck and were protected by gun shields. Her anti-aircraft armament consisted of two quick-firing (QF) 3-inch (76 mm) 20 cwt Mk I AA guns. (Note: "Cwt" is the abbreviation for hundredweight, 20 cwt referring to the weight of the gun.)

In August–September 1924, the 3-inch guns were replaced by a pair of QF 4-inch (102 mm) Mk V guns. During the ship's 1927–28 refit, the shelter deck 6-inch guns were removed and another pair of 4-inch AA guns were added. These were replaced by eight QF 4-inch Mk XVI guns in twin turrets during Royal Sovereign's 1937–1938 refit. A pair of eight-barrel 2-pounder "pom-poms" were added in 1932 abreast the funnel, and two four-barrel "pom-poms" were added in early 1942 atop 'B' and 'X' turrets. Ten 20 mm Oerlikon guns were also added in 1941. Another six were added in 1943. Royal Sovereign was initially equipped with four submerged 21 in (533 mm) torpedo tubes on her broadside, though the after pair were removed in 1932. The forward pair were also removed in 1937–1938, during the ship's last prewar refit.

=== Fire control ===
Royal Sovereign was completed with two fire-control directors fitted with 15-foot (4.6 m) rangefinders. One was mounted above the conning tower, protected by an armoured hood, and the other was in the spotting top above the tripod foremast. Each turret was also fitted with a 15-foot rangefinder. The main armament could be controlled by 'X' turret as well. The secondary armament was primarily controlled by directors mounted on each side of the compass platform on the foremast once they were fitted in March 1917. A 30-foot (9.1 m) rangefinder replaced the smaller one originally fitted in 'X' turret in 1919. Similarly, another large rangefinder was fitted in 'B' turret during the ship's 1921–1922 refit. A simple high-angle rangefinder was added above the bridge during that same refit.

About 1931, a High-Angle Control System (HACS) Mk I director replaced the high-angle rangefinder on the spotting top. During the 1932 refit two positions for 2-pounder "pom-pom" anti-aircraft directors were added on new platforms abreast and below the fire-control director in the spotting top. In the 1937–1938 refit a HACS Mark III director replaced the Mk I in the spotting top and another was added to the torpedo-control tower aft. By 1942, a Type 279 air warning radar, a Type 273 surface-search radar, a Type 284 gunnery radar and two Type 285 anti-aircraft gunnery radars were installed. By September 1943, the Type 284 radar had been replaced by an improved Type 284B and two Type 282 radars had been fitted for the "pom-poms".

=== Protection ===
Royal Sovereign's waterline belt consisted of face-hardened Krupp cemented armour (KC) that was 13 inches (330 mm) thick between 'A' and 'Y' barbettes and thinned to 4 to 6 inches (102 to 152 mm) towards the ship's ends, but did not reach either the bow or the stern. Above this was a strake of armour 6 inches thick that extended between 'A' and 'X' barbettes. Transverse bulkheads 4 to 6 inches thick ran at an angle from the ends of the thickest part of the waterline belt to 'A' and 'Y' barbettes.

The gun turrets were protected by 11 to 13 inches (279 to 330 mm) of KC armour, except for the turret roofs which were 4.75–5 inches (121–127 mm) thick. The barbettes ranged in thickness from 6–10 inches (152–254 mm) above the upper deck, but were only 4 to 6 inches thick below it. The Revenge-class ships had multiple armoured decks that ranged from 1 to 4 inches (25 to 102 mm) in thickness. The main conning tower had 13 inches of armour on the sides with a 3-inch (76 mm) roof. The torpedo control tower in the rear superstructure had 6 inches of armour protecting it. After the Battle of Jutland, 1 inch of high-tensile steel was added to the main deck over the magazines and additional anti-flash equipment was added in the magazines. In 1918 the gun shields for the upper deck 6-inch guns were replaced by armoured casemates.

To protect against underwater explosions, the ship was fitted with longitudinal torpedo bulkheads 1 to 1.5 inches (38 mm) inches thick that ran from the forward to the rear magazines. During her 1921 refit, Royal Sovereign was fitted with an anti-torpedo bulge that ran the length of the ship between the fore and aft barbettes. It was divided into a water-tight empty lower compartment and an upper compartment filled with water-tight "crushing tubes" intended to absorb and distribute the force of an explosion. The space between the tubes was filled with wood and cement.

=== Aircraft ===
The ship was fitted with flying-off platforms mounted on the roofs of 'B' and 'X' turrets in 1918, from which fighters and reconnaissance aircraft could launch. In 1932 the platforms were removed from the turrets and a trainable catapult was installed on her quarterdeck, along with a crane to recover a seaplane. The catapult and crane were removed by March 1937.

== Service history ==
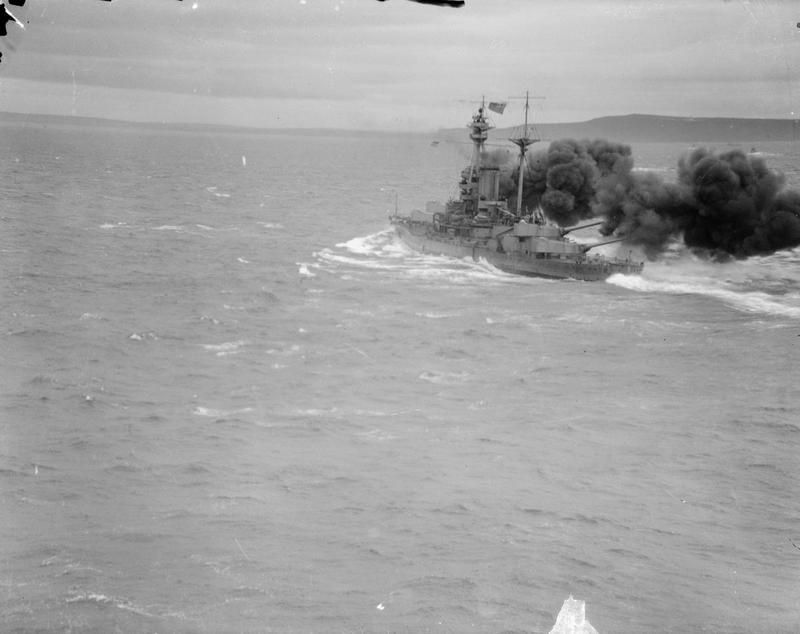
Royal Sovereign conducting gunnery training during the First World War

=== First World War ===
Royal Sovereign was laid down on 15 January 1914 at the HM Dockyard, Portsmouth. The ship was launched on 29 April 1915 and commissioned in May 1916. On 30 May 1916, three weeks after her commissioning, Royal Sovereign was present in Scapa Flow when the fleet commander, Admiral John Jellicoe ordered the Grand Fleet to sea. Jellicoe purposely left Royal Sovereign behind in port due to the inexperience of her crew; causing her to miss the Battle of Jutland the following day. In the months after the engagement, Royal Sovereign was quickly made ready for service with the fleet to further increase the numerical superiority of the Grand Fleet over the German High Seas Fleet.

The Grand Fleet sortied on 18 August 1916 to ambush the High Seas Fleet while it advanced into the southern North Sea, but a series of miscommunications and mistakes during the action of 19 August prevented Jellicoe from intercepting the German fleet before it returned to port. Two light cruisers were sunk by German U-boats during the operation, prompting Jellicoe to decide to not risk the major units of the fleet south of 55° 30' North due to the prevalence of German submarines and mines. The Admiralty concurred and stipulated that the Grand Fleet would not sortie unless the German fleet was attempting an invasion of Britain or there was a strong possibility it could be forced into an engagement under suitable conditions.

In April 1918, the High Seas Fleet again sortied, to attack British convoys to Norway. They enforced strict wireless silence during the operation, which prevented Room 40 cryptanalysts from warning the new commander of the Grand Fleet, Admiral David Beatty. The British learned of the operation only after an accident aboard the battlecruiser SMS Moltke forced her to break radio silence to inform the German commander of her condition. Beatty then ordered the Grand Fleet to sea to intercept the Germans, but he was not able to reach the High Seas Fleet before it turned back for Germany. This was the last time Royal Sovereign and the rest of the Grand Fleet would go to sea for the remainder of the war. On 21 November 1918, following the Armistice, the entire Grand Fleet left port to escort the surrendered German fleet into internment at Scapa Flow.

=== Inter-war period ===
The Royal Marines detachment assigned to Royal Sovereign left the ship on 21 June 1919 to conduct exercises. The ship meanwhile went into drydock at Invergordon in September. Post-war demobilisation in 1919 saw some 500 men leave the ship while she was in dock. Upon returning to service in late 1919, the ship was assigned to the 1st Battle Squadron of the Atlantic Fleet. Conflicts between Greece and the crumbling Ottoman Empire prompted the Royal Navy to deploy a force to the eastern Mediterranean. In April 1920, Royal Sovereign and her sister ship Resolution steamed to the region via Malta. While in the Ottoman capital Constantinople, Royal Sovereign and the other British warships took on White émigrés fleeing the Communist Red Army. Among those refugees aboard Royal Sovereign was a princess of the Galitzine family.

The 1922 Washington Naval Treaty cut the battleship strength of the Royal Navy from forty ships to fifteen. The remaining active battleships were divided between the Atlantic and Mediterranean Fleets and conducted joint operations annually. Royal Sovereign remained with the Atlantic Fleet through 1926. On 4 October 1927, the ship was placed in reserve to effect a major refit. Four new rangefinders and eight searchlights were installed. On 15 May 1929, the refit was finished, and the ship was assigned to the 1st Battle Squadron of the Mediterranean Fleet. The squadron consisted of Royal Sovereign, her sisters Resolution and Revenge, and Queen Elizabeth, and based in Malta. By the 1930s, the five ships of the Queen Elizabeth class were rotated through extensive modernisation. Royal Sovereign and her sisters, however, were smaller and slower than the Queen Elizabeth class, and so they were not extensively modernised in the inter-war period. The only changes made were augmentations to their anti-aircraft batteries.

Fleet exercises in 1934 were carried out in the Bay of Biscay, followed by a fleet regatta in Navarino Bay off Greece. In 1935, the ship returned to Britain for the Jubilee Fleet Review for King George V. In August 1935, Royal Sovereign was transferred to the 2nd Battle Squadron of the Atlantic Fleet, where she served as the flagship of Rear Admiral Charles Ramsey. The ship served as a training vessel until 2 June 1937, when she was again placed in reserve for a major overhaul. This lasted until 18 February 1938, after which she returned to the 2nd Battle Squadron. In 1939, King George VI made a state visit to Canada; Royal Sovereign and the rest of the fleet escorted his ship halfway across the Atlantic and met it on the return leg of the voyage.

In early 1939, the Admiralty considered plans to send Royal Sovereign and her four sisters to Asia to counter Japanese expansionism. They reasoned that the then established "Singapore strategy", which called for a fleet to be formed in Britain to be dispatched to confront a Japanese attack was inherently risky due to the long delay. They argued that a dedicated battle fleet would allow for faster reaction. The plan was abandoned, however, because the new King George V-class battleships would not begin to enter service until 1941. In the last weeks of August 1939, the Royal Navy began to concentrate in wartime bases as tensions with Germany rose. Royal Sovereign steamed to Invergordon, where she joined her sisters Resolution and Royal Oak, Rodney, and the battlecruiser Repulse. By 31 August, the force joined Nelson, the flagship of Admiral Charles Forbes, the commander of the Home Fleet.

=== Second World War ===
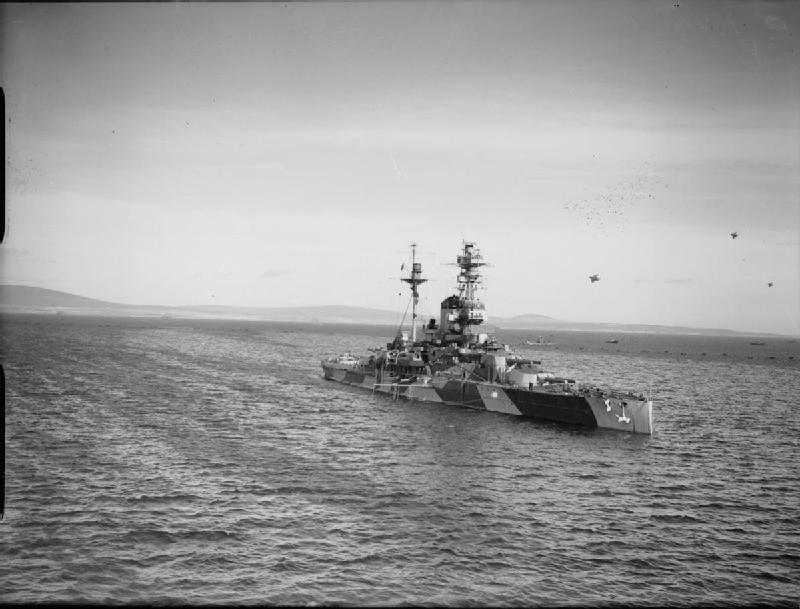
Royal Sovereign at anchor in Scapa Flow

On 31 August, the day before the German invasion of Poland, Royal Sovereign was assigned to a screening force in the Greenland-Iceland-United Kingdom gap to patrol for German merchant ships that might be attempting to reach Germany. At the outset of war in September 1939, Royal Sovereign was assigned to the 2nd Battle Squadron of the Home Fleet. She was assigned to the North Atlantic Escort Force, which was based in Halifax, Nova Scotia, and was tasked with protecting convoys to Britain. Upon returning to Plymouth, she underwent a short refit. In May 1940, she moved to the Mediterranean Fleet. There she was based in Alexandria with the battleships Warspite, Malaya, and Valiant, under the command of Admiral Andrew Cunningham. On 25–27 June, she and her sister ship HMS Ramillies escorted two convoys from Alexandria to Malta. On 28 June, aerial reconnaissance located Italian destroyers off Zakynthos; Admiral John Tovey took the 7th Cruiser Squadron. Royal Sovereign was left behind due to her slow speed. Cunningham split his fleet into three groups; Royal Sovereign and Malaya were the core of Group C. She was present at the Battle of Calabria on 18 July, but her slow speed prevented her from engaging the Italian battleships. Warspite bore the brunt of the action, as Royal Sovereign and Malaya lagged behind.

In mid-August 1940, while steaming in the Red Sea, Royal Sovereign was unsuccessfully attacked by the Galileo Ferraris. Later that month, she returned to Atlantic convoy duties. These lasted until August 1941, when periodic maintenance was effected in Norfolk, Virginia. The Admiralty decided in May 1941 to deploy a powerful fleet to be based in Singapore to counter any Japanese attempt to invade Western colonies in Southeast Asia. Royal Sovereign and her sisters Revenge, Ramillies, and Resolution were assigned to the force. The unit was to have been assembled in Singapore by March 1942, though Royal Sovereign reached the theatre earlier. At the beginning of March 1942, Royal Sovereign, the heavy cruiser Cornwall, and several smaller vessels escorted the convoy SU.1 of twelve troopships transporting 10,090 soldiers. The convoy departed Colombo on 1 March, bound for Australia. The convoy reached Fremantle without incident on 15 March.

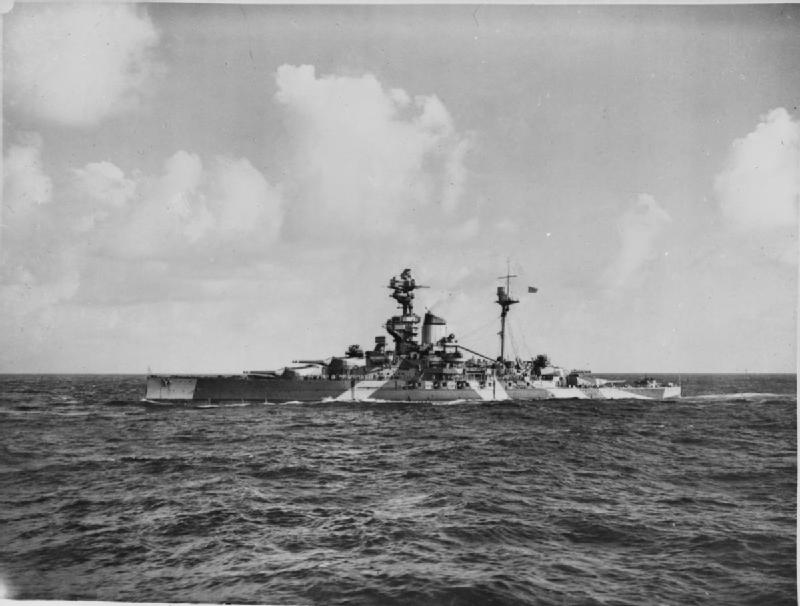
Royal Sovereign underway in the Indian Ocean

By the end of March 1942, the Eastern Fleet had been formed, under the command of Admiral James Somerville. The fleet was centred on a pair of fleet aircraft carriers, the elderly carrier Hermes, and five battleships, four of which were Royal Sovereign and her sisters; the fifth was Warspite. The fleet also included seven cruisers and sixteen destroyers. Despite the numerical strength of the Eastern Fleet, many of its units, including the four Revenge-class battleships, were no longer front-line warships. Vice Admiral Chūichi Nagumo's powerful Kido Butai, composed of six carriers and four fast battleships, was significantly stronger than Somerville's Eastern Fleet. As a result, only the modernised Warspite could operate with the two fleet carriers; Royal Sovereign, her three sisters, and Hermes were kept away from combat to escort convoys in the Indian Ocean.

In late March, the code-breakers at the Far East Combined Bureau, a branch of Bletchley Park, informed Somerville that the Japanese were planning a raid into the Indian Ocean to attack Colombo and Trincomalee and destroy his fleet. He therefore divided his fleet into two groups: Force A, which consisted of the two fleet carriers, Warspite and four cruisers, and Force B, centred on Royal Sovereign and her sisters and the carrier Hermes. He intended to ambush Nagumo's fleet in a night action, the only method by which he thought he could achieve a victory. After three days of searching for the Japanese fleet without success, Somerville returned to Addu Atoll to refuel. While refuelling his ships, Somerville received a report that the Japanese fleet was approaching Colombo, which they attacked the following day, on 5 April, followed by attacks on Trincomalee on 9 April.

Following the raid in April 1942, Somerville withdrew Royal Sovereign and her three sisters to Mombasa, where they could secure the shipping routes in the Middle East and the Persian Gulf. Royal Sovereign and her sisters departed from Addu Atoll early on the morning on 9 April, bound for Mombasa. Here they remained stationed until September 1943, with the exception of another long period in the dockyard in Philadelphia in late 1942. While Royal Sovereign was moored in Philadelphia, the American light cruiser USS Boise, a badly damaged veteran of the Battle of Cape Esperance, shared a pier with her. During the refit, the ship's deck armour was increased by 2 inches (51 mm) and four of her six-inch guns were removed. Royal Sovereign was sent back to the United States for a major overhaul in Philadelphia, from March to September 1943. She then returned to the Indian Ocean to resume her patrol duties. In January 1944, she left the Indian Ocean, bound for Britain.

==== Service with the Soviet Navy ====
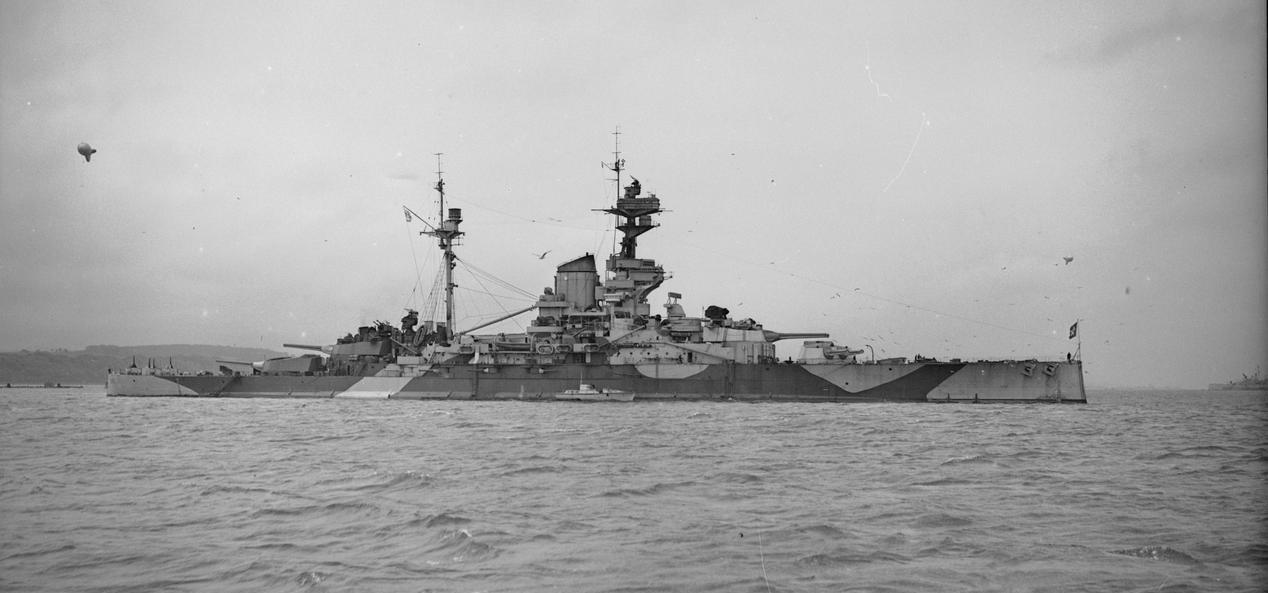
Royal Sovereign as Arkhangelsk in Soviet service

After returning to Britain, Royal Sovereign was sent to the naval base in Scapa Flow. On 30 May 1944 she was transferred on loan to the Soviet Navy as Arkhangelsk in lieu of war reparations from Italy, as there was concerns about mutiny from sailors in the newly allied country. The ship left Britain on 17 August 1944 as part of the escort for Convoy JW 59, which contained thirty-three merchant vessels. Six days later, while still en route, the convoy was attacked by the U-boat U-711. The submarine's captain, Hans-Günther Lange, incorrectly reported hits on Arkhangelsk and a destroyer, though his torpedoes had exploded prematurely. Under the impression that they had crippled the battleship, the Germans launched several submarine attacks on the ship while she was moored in Kola. Anti-torpedo nets ensured that the attacks failed, however. The Germans then planned to use six Biber midget submarines to attack the ship, but mechanical difficulties eventually forced the cancellation of the plan. Regardless, Arkhangelsk had already departed Kola to patrol the White Sea by the time the Bibers would have arrived. A Soviet crew commissioned the ship on 29 August 1944 at Polyarny. Arkhangelsk was the largest ship in the Soviet fleet during the war. While in Soviet service, she was the flagship of Admiral Gordey Levchenko and was tasked with meeting Allied convoys in the Arctic Ocean and escorting them into Kola. The ship itself was poorly winterized before its transfer to the Soviet Navy, and it lacked shipwide heating systems as well as turret lubricants suited for the conditions of the Arctic convoys.

Arkhangelsk ran aground in the White Sea in late 1947; the extent of damage, if any, is unknown. The Soviet Navy returned the ship to the Royal Navy on 4 February 1949 after the former Giulio Cesare was transferred to the Soviet Black Sea Fleet. The Soviet Navy – intending to keep the vessel – had initially sought to avoid sending the ship back, claiming that she was not sufficiently seaworthy to make the voyage back to Britain. After an inspection by a Royal Navy officer, however, the Soviet Navy agreed to return the vessel in January 1949. Upon returning to the Rosyth naval base, Royal Navy personnel thoroughly inspected the ship and found much of her equipment to be unserviceable. It appeared to the inspectors that the main battery turrets had not been rotated while the ship was in Soviet service, and were jammed on the centreline. She was sold for scrap, the last member of her class to suffer this fate. The ship arrived at Thos. W. Ward's scrapyard at Inverkeithing, Scotland, on 18 May to be broken up. The elevation mechanisms from her main battery gun turrets were later reused in the 250-foot (76 m) Mark I radio telescope at Jodrell Bank, Cheshire built in 1955–1957.
