= Revenge-class battleship =

Class of Battleships built for royal navy

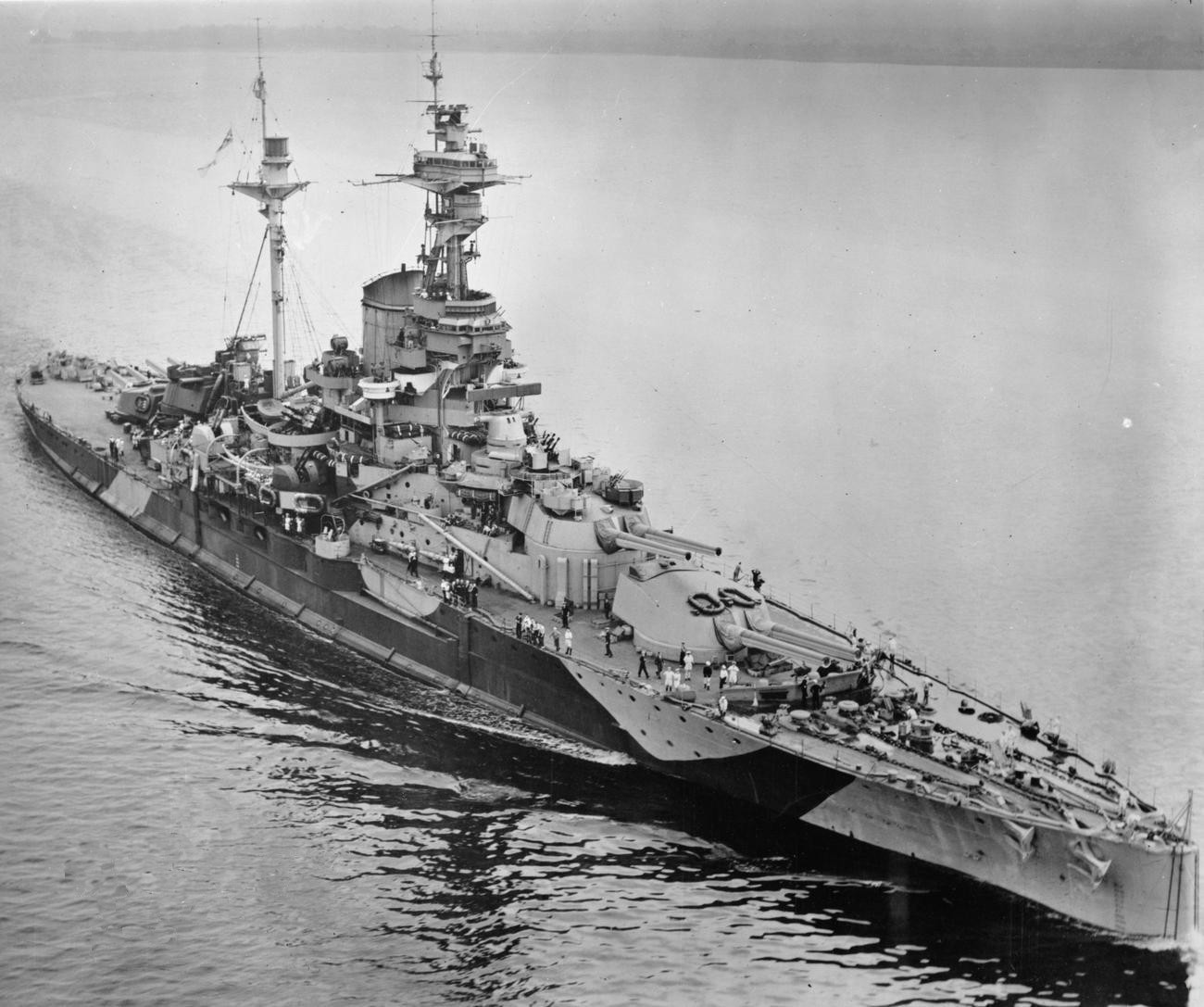
- Royal Sovereign at Philadelphia, September 1943

Class overview
- Name: Revenge class
- Builders: Devonport Dockyard; Palmers; Portsmouth Dockyard; Vickers; William Beardmore
- Operators: Royal Navy; Soviet Navy
- Preceded by: Queen Elizabeth class
- Succeeded by: N3 class (planned); Nelson class (actual)
- Built: 1913–1917
- In commission: 1916–1949
- Planned: 8
- Completed: 5
- Cancelled: 3
- Lost: 1
- Retired: 4

General characteristics (as built)
- Type: Dreadnought battleship
- Displacement: 29,590 long tons (30,060 t); 32,820 long tons (33,350 t) (Deep load)
- Length: 620 ft 7 in (189.2 m)
- Beam: 88 ft 6 in (27 m)
- Draught: 33 ft 7 in (10.2 m) (Deep load)
- Installed power: 18 Babcock & Wilcox boilers; 40,000 shp (30,000 kW)
- Propulsion: 4 shafts; 2 steam turbine sets
- Speed: 21 knots (39 km/h; 24 mph)
- Range: 7,000 nmi (13,000 km; 8,100 mi) at 10 knots (19 km/h; 12 mph)
- Crew: 940 (1917)
- Armament: 4 × twin 15 in (381 mm) guns; 14 × single 6 in (152 mm) guns; 2 × single 3 in (76 mm) AA guns; 4 × single 47 mm (1.9 in) 3-pdr guns; 4 × 21 in (533 mm) torpedo tubes
- Armour: Waterline belt: 13 in (330 mm); Deck: 1–4 in (25–102 mm); Barbettes: 6–10 in (152–254 mm); Gun turrets: 11–13 in (279–330 mm); Conning tower: 3–11 in (76–279 mm); Bulkheads: 4 to 6 in (102 to 152 mm)

The Revenge class, sometimes referred to as the Royal Sovereign class or the R class, consisted of five Dreadnought battleships built for the Royal Navy in the 1910s. All of the ships were completed to see service during the First World War. There were originally to have been eight of the class, but two were later redesigned, becoming the Renown-class battlecruisers, and another, which was to have been named HMS Resistance, was cancelled outright. The design was based on that of the preceding Queen Elizabeth class, but with reductions in size and speed to make them more economical to build.

Two of the ships, Revenge and Royal Oak, were completed in time to see action at the Battle of Jutland during the First World War, where they engaged German battlecruisers. The other three ships were completed after the battle, by which time the British and German fleets had adopted more cautious strategies, and as a result, the class saw no further substantial action. During the early 1920s, the ships were involved in the Greco-Turkish War and the Russian Civil War as part of the Mediterranean Fleet. They typically operated as a unit during the interwar period, including stints in the Atlantic Fleet. All five members of the class were modernised in the 1930s, particularly to strengthen their anti-aircraft defences and fire-control equipment.

The ships saw extensive action during the Second World War, though they were no longer front-line units by this time and thus were frequently relegated to secondary duties such as convoy escort and naval gunfire support. Royal Oak was sunk at her moorings in Scapa Flow in October 1939 by a German U-boat, and two other ships of the class were torpedoed during the war; Resolution, hit by a Vichy French submarine off Dakar in 1940 and Ramillies, attacked by a Japanese submarine in Madagascar in 1942; both survived. Royal Sovereign ended the war in service with the Soviet Navy as Arkhangelsk, but she was returned in 1949, by which time her three surviving sister ships had been broken up for scrap. She, too, was dismantled that year.

== Design and description ==
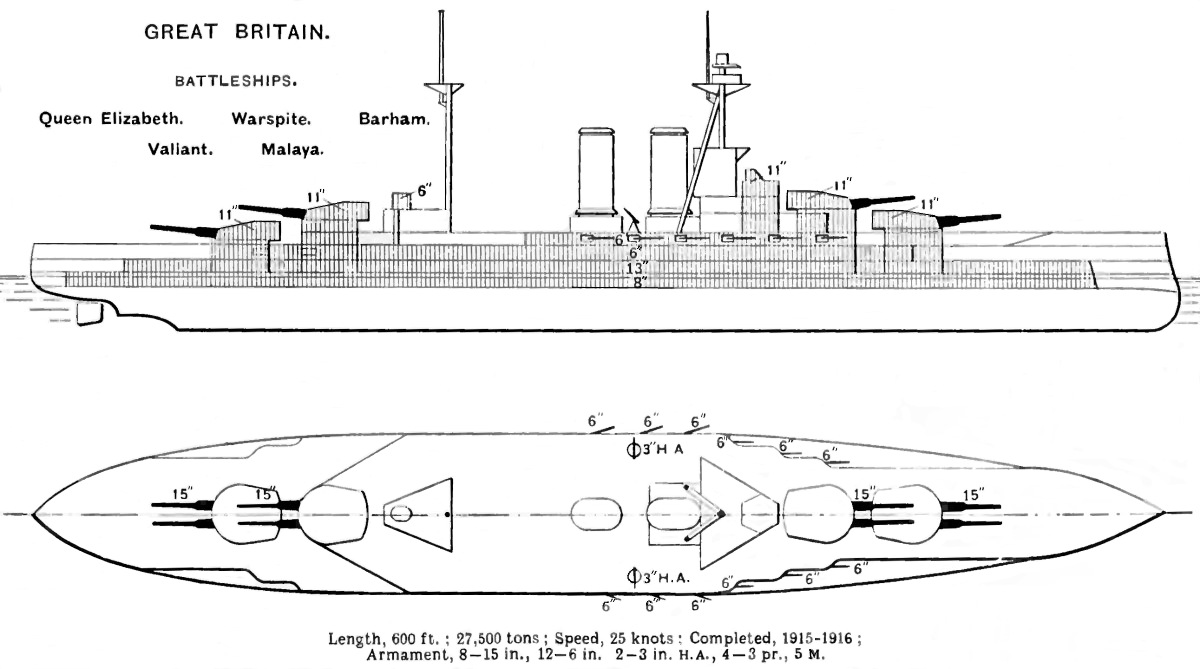
Diagram of the Queen Elizabeth class, which provided the basis for the Revenge design

In the early 1900s, Germany challenged Britain in a naval arms race under the direction of Admiral Alfred von Tirpitz that was exacerbated by the dreadnought revolution. The Royal Navy embarked on a construction programme to out-build the Germans to maintain its dominance of the seas. Beginning with the launch of Dreadnought, the British had built or laid down twenty-seven all-big-gun battleships to the Germans' seventeen built or building by 1913; to cement their lead, the British ordered another group of battleships for the 1913 Estimates.

The Revenge-class ships (sometimes referred to as the "Royal Sovereign class" or the "R class") were designed as slightly smaller, slower, and more heavily protected versions of the preceding Queen Elizabeth-class battleships. The design staff, led by Eustace Tennyson d'Eyncourt, the Director of Naval Construction, had been charged by the Board of Admiralty with developing a version of the earlier Iron Duke class armed with the same battery of 15-inch (380 mm) guns used in the Queen Elizabeths, albeit with the same number as the Iron Dukes—ten rather than the eight of the Queen Elizabeth design. As an economy measure they were intended to revert to the previous practice of using both fuel oil and coal, but First Sea Lord Jackie Fisher rescinded the decision for coal in October 1914. Still under construction, the ships were redesigned to employ oil-fired boilers that increased the power of the engines by 9,000 shaft horsepower (6,700 kW) over the original specification.

The initial design completed by d'Eyncourt's team mounted only eight 15 in guns, despite the request from the Board, since he could not fit the fifth twin-gun turret in the specified displacement limit. The Board suggested triple turrets to solve the weight problem, but d'Eyncourt pointed out that no suitable design existed, which would significantly delay construction. He was also opposed to the idea since a single hit on a turret would disable more guns. As a result, the Board approved d'Eyncourt's proposal on 31 March 1913.

=== General characteristics and propulsion ===
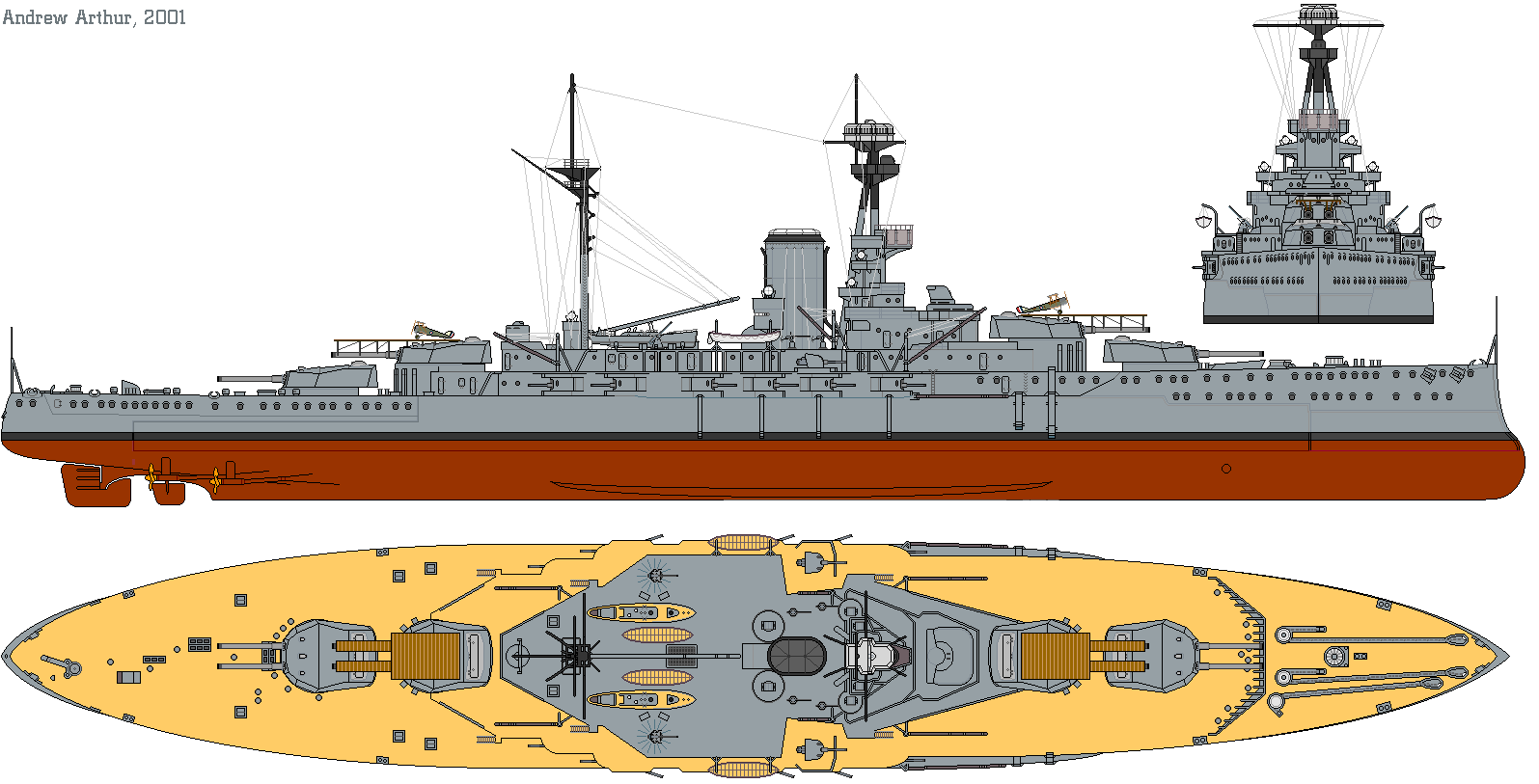
3-view drawing of HMS Revenge as she was in 1916

The ships of the Revenge class were 580 feet 3 inches (176.9 m) long between perpendiculars, 614 ft 6 in (187.3 m) long at the waterline, and had a length overall of 620 ft 7 in (189.2 m). They had a beam of 88 feet 6 inches (27 m) (which was increased to approximately 101 ft 6 in (30.9 m) with the addition of anti-torpedo bulges) and a deep draught of 30 feet 9 inches (9.4 m) fully loaded without a bulge and 29 feet 8 inches (9 m) with a bulge. They had a normal displacement without a bulge of approximately 28,000 long tons (28,449 t) and 31,200 long tons (31,700 t) at deep load. Equivalent figures for those ships fitted with a bulge were about 30,000 long tons (30,481 t) or 32,800 long tons (33,326 t), depending on the type of bulge fitted. The ships' metacentric height was 3.4 feet (1.0 m) at deep load without a bulge fitted and 5.1 feet (1.6 m) with a bulge.

Their crew numbered between 909 and 940 officers and ratings in 1917; by the early 1920s, the number of crew had grown to 1,012 to 1,240. Each battleship carried a number of smaller boats, including a variety of steam and sail pinnaces, steam launches, cutters, whalers, dinghies, and rafts. These were handled by five boat derricks. The ships were fitted with eight searchlights, four on the bridge, two at the base of the funnel and two on the after superstructure.

They were powered by two sets of Parsons steam turbines, each driving two shafts with 3-bladed screws, using steam provided by eighteen Babcock & Wilcox boilers at a working pressure of 235 psi (1,620 kPa; 17 kgf/cm^{2}) in all but Resolution and Royal Oak, which received boilers manufactured by Yarrow. The boilers were ducted into a single funnel. The turbines were divided into three watertight compartments arranged side by side; the low-pressure turbines driving the inner pair of shafts were in the centre engine room together, while the high-pressure outboard turbines were in the rooms on either side.

The turbines were rated at 40,000 shaft horsepower (30,000 kW) and intended to give the ships a maximum speed of 23 knots (43 km/h; 26 mph), although Revenge only reached a top speed of 21.9 knots (40.6 km/h; 25.2 mph) from 41,938 shp (31,273 kW) during her sea trials on 24 March 1916. The other members of the class had similar performance, with only Royal Oak making 22 kn (41 km/h; 25 mph) on trials. The bulged Ramillies reached 21.4 knots (39.6 km/h; 24.6 mph) from 42,383 shp (31,605 kW) during her sea trials on 20 September 1917, less than half a knot slower than the unbulged ships. Fuel storage amounted to 900 long tons (910 t) of fuel oil and 3,400 long tons (3,500 t) of coal as designed, but on conversion to only oil-fired boilers, the storage capacity was 3,400 long tons of oil. This enabled the ships to steam for 7,000 nautical miles (13,000 km; 8,100 mi) at a cruising speed of 10 knots (19 km/h; 12 mph), which fell to 2,700 nautical miles (5,000 km; 3,100 mi) at full speed.

=== Armament and fire control ===
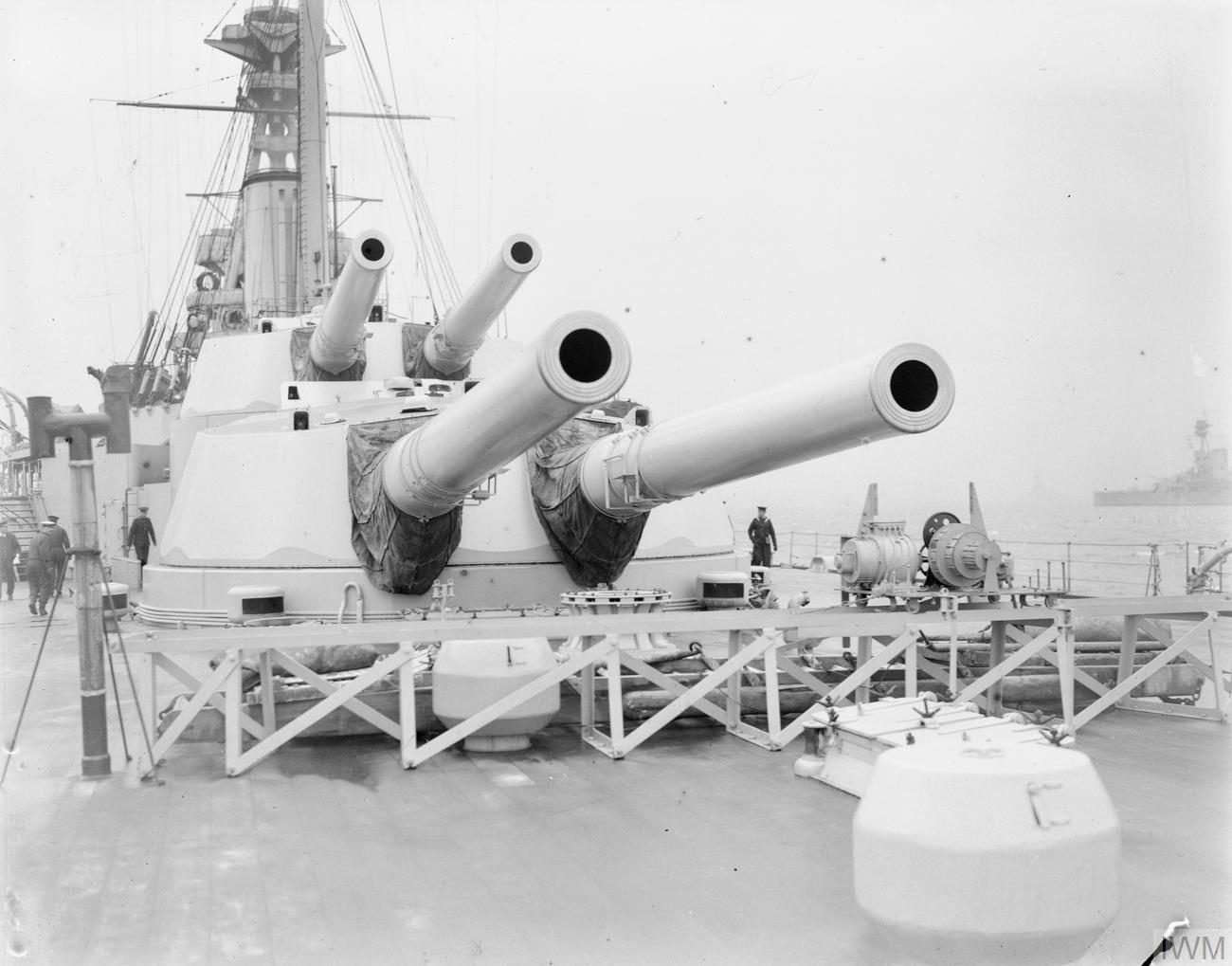
Royal Oak's aft pair of turrets

The Revenge class was equipped with eight breech-loading (BL) 15-inch (381 mm) Mk I guns in four twin-gun turrets, in two superfiring pairs fore and aft of the superstructure, designated 'A', 'B', 'X', and 'Y' from front to rear. The guns were initially supplied with eighty shells per gun, but the magazines were later modified to allow for up to one hundred shells per gun. The ships carried the guns in Mk I turrets that allowed for elevation to 20 degrees and depression to -5 degrees. The guns could be loaded at any angle, but the crews typically returned to +5 degrees, since the guns could be cleared faster that way. They fired 1,929-pound (875 kg) projectiles at a muzzle velocity of 2,450 ft/s (750 m/s) to a range of 24,423 yards (22,332 m). Their designed rate of fire was one shot every 36 seconds.

The ships' secondary battery consisted of fourteen BL 6-inch (152 mm) Mk XII guns, twelve of which were mounted in casemates along the broadside of the vessel amidships; the remaining pair were mounted on the shelter deck and were protected by gun shields. The casemate guns were moved further aft from the bow to reduce the tendency of the gun ports to ship water in heavy seas, a problem encountered with both the Iron Duke and Queen Elizabeth classes. The guns had a muzzle velocity of 2,825 ft/s (861 m/s) from their 100-pound (45 kg) projectiles. At their maximum elevation of 15 degrees, they had a range of 13,600 yd (12,400 m).

The ships also mounted four 3-pounder (47-millimetre (1.9 in)) guns. Their anti-aircraft (AA) armament consisted of two quick-firing (QF) 3-inch (76 mm) 20 cwt Mk I (Note: "Cwt" is the abbreviation for hundredweight, 20 cwt referring to the weight of the gun.) guns. They were fitted with four submerged 21-inch (533 mm) torpedo tubes, two on each broadside. Each ship was supplied with a total of twenty-one torpedoes of the Mk II, Mk IV, and MK IVHB types.

The Revenge-class ships were completed with two fire-control directors fitted with 15-foot (4.6 m) rangefinders. One was mounted above the conning tower, protected by an armoured hood, and the other was aloft on the tripod mast. Each turret was also fitted with a 15-foot rangefinder. The main armament could be controlled by 'X' turret as well. The secondary armament was primarily controlled by directors mounted on each side of the compass platform on the foremast once they began to be fitted in March 1917. A torpedo-control director with a 9-foot (2.7 m) rangefinder was mounted at the aft end of the superstructure. The rangefinders in 'B' and 'X' turrets were replaced by 30-foot (9.1 m) models between 1919 and 1922.

Flying-off platforms were fitted on all the ships on the roofs of 'B' and 'X' turrets in 1918. Between them the ships carried two fighters and eight reconnaissance aircraft. These platforms were removed as the ships were refitted in the early 1930s. Resolution was briefly fitted with an aircraft catapult on the quarterdeck in early 1930 and Royal Sovereign had one in 1933–1936. All of the ships except Revenge and Royal Sovereign were equipped with a catapult atop 'X' turret in the mid-1930s. Resolution kept hers until late 1942 or early 1943.

=== Protection ===
The ships' waterline belt consisted of Krupp cemented armour (KC) that was 13 inches (330 mm) thick between 'A' and 'Y' barbettes and thinned to 4 to 6 inches (102 to 152 mm) towards the ships' ends, but did not reach either the bow or the stern. Above this was a strake of armour 6 inches thick that extended between 'A' and 'X' barbettes. Transverse bulkheads 4 to 6 inches thick ran at an angle from the ends of the thickest part of the waterline belt to 'A' and 'Y' barbettes. The gun turrets were protected by 11 to 13 inches (279 to 330 mm) of KC armour, except for the turret roofs which were 4.75–5 inches (121–127 mm) thick. The barbettes ranged in thickness from 6–10 inches (152–254 mm) above the upper deck, but were only 4 to 6 inches thick below it. The Revenge-class ships had multiple armoured decks that ranged from 1 to 4 inches (25 to 102 mm) in thickness. The main conning tower had 11 inches of armour on the sides with a 3-inch roof. The torpedo director in the rear superstructure had 6 inches of armour protecting it. After the Battle of Jutland, 1 inch of high-tensile steel was added to the main deck over the magazines and additional anti-flash equipment was added in the magazines.

==== Anti-torpedo Bulges ====
Ramillies was the least advanced in construction when the Director of Naval Construction decided to fit bulges to the ship to improve her survivability against naval mines and torpedoes in March 1915, making her the first capital ship in the world to be bulged. Testing had revealed that a bulge filled with hollow tubes substantially reduced the effectiveness of a torpedo warhead. The bulge scabbed onto Ramillies's hull was 220 feet (67.1 m) long and 7 feet 3 inches (2.21 m) high; it was divided into two watertight compartments with the upper and lower inner compartments filled with 9-inch (22.9 cm) steel "crush" tubes with their ends plugged by wooden bungs. They were intended to absorb the force of an underwater detonation and prevent splinters and debris from penetrating the inner torpedo bulkhead. The watertight outer compartment was also divided longitudinally, but it was empty to allow the force of the detonation to disperse. The form of the bulge increased the ship's beam to 102 feet 6 inches (31.2 m), decreased her draught by about 1 foot (30.5 cm) and increased her displacement by 2,500 long tons (2,500 t).

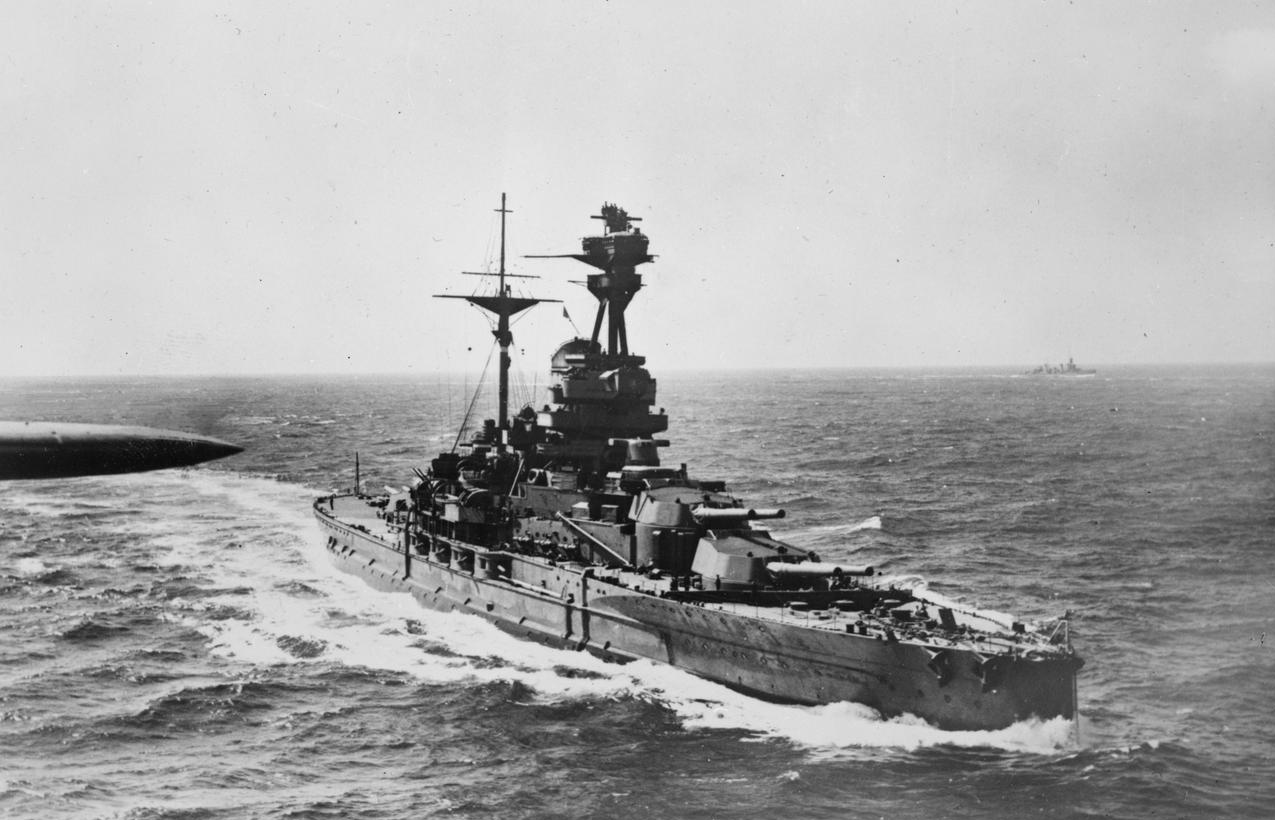
Revenge at sea in 1940

Resolution and Revenge were fitted with a different form of bulge in 1917–1918 that was intended to improve their stability as well as protect them against underwater threats. This discarded the crushing tubes to save weight and was only a single watertight compartment deep. It was divided into upper and lower compartments, of which the upper was filled with a mixture of concrete and scrap wood while the lower was empty. The bulge increased their beam to about 101 feet 5 inches (30.9 m), reduced their draught by 16 inches (41 cm) and increased their displacement by 1,526 long tons (1,550 t).

Yet another form of bulge was installed aboard Royal Sovereign during her 1920–1924 refit. Based on the preceding form, the upper compartment was enlarged so that it extended above the waterline and crush tubes replaced the concrete and wood mixture. This weighed 1,474 long tons (1,498 t). Reports had been received from the bulged ships of excessive rolling and the Admiralty Experiment Works conducted experiments to determine the best form of a bulge to eliminate the problem in conjunction with improved bilge keels. Royal Oak was the only ship of the class lacking a bulge by this time. When fitted during her 1922–1924 refit, her bulges were mostly empty, although their lower compartments were partially filled with water. They also extended much further up the side of the ship. This form of the bulge increased her metacentric height to 5.5 feet (1.7 m). Ramillies's bulges were modified during her 1926–1927 to a form much like those of Royal Oak; all of her crush tubes were removed, except those abreast of the magazines. Resolution had the concrete and wood mixture removed from her bulge and the lower compartment partially filled with water during her 1929–1931 refit; the same was done for Revenge during her 1931 refit.

== Ships in class ==
Construction data
Name	Pennant	Builder	Laid down	Launched	Commissioned	Fate
Revenge (ex-Renown)	06	Vickers, Barrow-in-Furness	22 December 1913	29 May 1915	1 February 1916	Broken up at Inverkeithing, 1948
Resolution	09	Palmers, Jarrow	29 November 1913	14 January 1915	30 December 1916	Broken up at Faslane, 1949
Royal Oak	08	HM Dockyard, Devonport	15 January 1914	17 November 1914	1 May 1916	Sunk at Scapa Flow, October 1939
Royal Sovereign	05	HM Dockyard, Portsmouth	15 January 1914	29 April 1915	18 April 1916	Transferred to the Soviet Navy as Arkhangelsk 1944–1949; Broken up at Inverkeithing, 1949
Ramillies	07	W. Beardmore, Dalmuir	12 November 1913	12 June 1916	1 September 1917	Broken up at Troon, 1949
Resistance	—N/a	HM Dockyard, Devonport	—N/a	—N/a	—N/a	Cancelled, August 1914
Renown	—N/a	—N/a	—N/a	—N/a	—N/a	Cancelled and reordered as Renown-class battlecruiser
Repulse	—N/a	—N/a	—N/a	—N/a	—N/a	Cancelled and reordered as Renown-class battlecruiser

== Service history ==
=== First World War ===
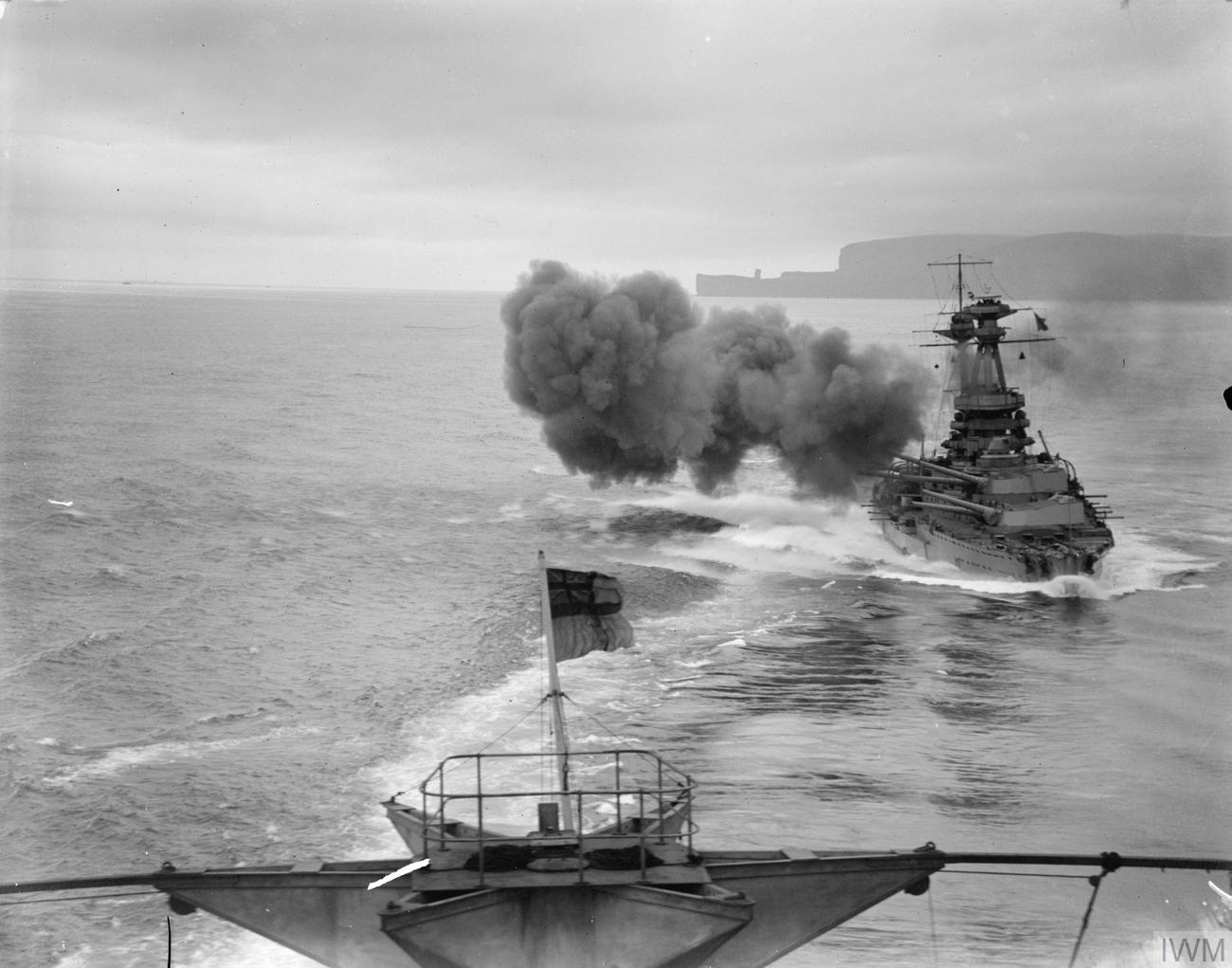
Royal Oak firing a broadside during the First World War

Three members of the class entered service by May 1916: Revenge, Royal Sovereign, and Royal Oak. Revenge was assigned to the 6th Division of the 1st Battle Squadron (BS), Grand Fleet, while Royal Oak initially served with the 3rd Division, 4th Battle Squadron. Royal Sovereign was left in port when the fleet sortied to meet the German High Seas Fleet off the coast of Jutland in late May, as her crew had not fully worked up by that time. During the ensuing Battle of Jutland, both Revenge and Royal Oak engaged German battlecruisers, Revenge damaging two of them—SMS Derfflinger and SMS Von der Tann—while Royal Oak scored a hit on a third—SMS Seydlitz. Revenge was forced to turn away to avoid torpedoes that damaged her squadron flagship and caused her squadron to lose contact with the rest of the fleet. Royal Oak remained with the main fleet for the duration of the action. Both ships emerged from the battle unscathed.

All three ships were present for the action of 19 August 1916, but the British and German fleets both withdrew before engaging each other directly, the British having lost a pair of light cruisers to German U-boats and the Germans having had one battleship damaged by a British submarine. By the end of the year, Resolution had joined the fleet, which was by that time reduced to patrolling the northern North Sea as both sides turned to positional warfare since the threat of underwater weapons was too great to risk another major fleet action like Jutland. Ramillies did not enter service until late 1917, as she had been badly damaged during her launching ceremony, which slowed her completion significantly. But during the lengthy period of repairs and fitting-out, the navy decided to experiment with the installation of anti-torpedo bulges to improve her ability to resist underwater damage. The bulges proved to be a success, not only increasing her defensive characteristics but also improving stability, while not having a significant negative impact on her speed; as a result, they were later added to the other members of the class during refits after the war.

After German forces began raiding British convoys to Norway in late 1917, the Grand Fleet began sending a battle squadron to cover them, prompting the Germans to attempt to ambush and destroy the isolated squadron in April 1918. German radio silence prevented the British from learning of the operation in advance, as they had at Jutland, though faulty German intelligence did not provide the correct date of the convoy. By the time the British realized the Germans were at sea, the High Seas Fleet had withdrawn far enough south so that the Grand Fleet could not catch them. On 21 November, following the Armistice, the entire Grand Fleet left port to escort the surrendered German fleet into internment at Scapa Flow.

=== Interwar period ===
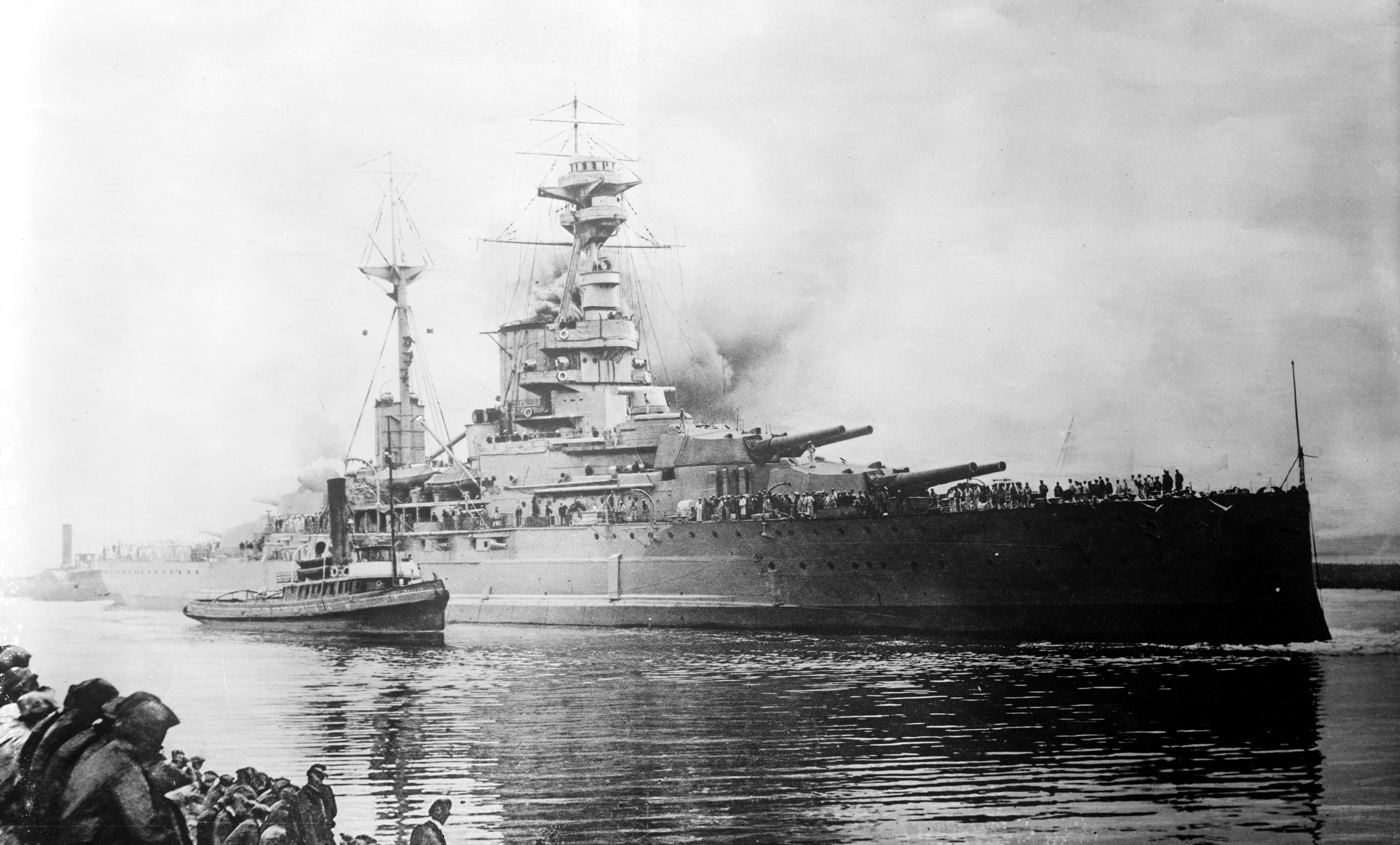
Ramillies, probably in the late 1910s or 1920s

Through the 1920s and 1930s, the Revenge-class battleships operated as a unit, alternating between the Atlantic Fleet and the Mediterranean Fleet, typically trading places with the five Queen Elizabeth-class ships. While serving in the Mediterranean Fleet in the early 1920s, the ships were involved in the Greco-Turkish War and the Russian Civil War. Four of the ships (all but Resolution) landed Royal Marines to take part in the occupation of Constantinople in March 1920. Throughout June and July, the ships participated in the fighting in the collapsing Ottoman Empire; Ramillies and Revenge shelled Turkish troops around Ismid in June and both ships, joined by Royal Sovereign, assisted with Greek landings elsewhere in Turkey. Also in July, Royal Sovereign assisted in the escape of White émigrés fleeing from the Soviet Red Army. During this period, Resolution primarily operated in the Black Sea, including a period at Batumi in southern Russia.

As the Revenges were refitted during the 1920s, their forecastle-deck six-inch guns were removed and they exchanged their pair of three-inch AA guns for QF four-inch (102 mm) Mk V guns, another pair of Mk V guns was added later. Each ship received an anti-aircraft control position with a 12-foot (3.7 m) rangefinder on its foremast, except for Revenge which was fitted with an anti-aircraft director HACS Mk I system instead. In addition the torpedo-control arrangements were improved and equipped with 12-foot rangefinders.

After a stint in the Atlantic Fleet in 1921, the ships briefly returned to the Mediterranean in September 1922 during a crisis in Smyrna that culminated in the Great fire of Smyrna as the Greco-Turkish War came to its conclusion. The ships returned to the Atlantic Fleet in November. In 1924, Resolution accidentally rammed and sank the submarine HMS L24 during training exercises, killing all aboard. Royal Oak was involved in the so-called "Royal Oak Mutiny", between her commander, Captain Kenneth Dewar and Commander Henry Daniel, also an officer aboard the ship and Rear-Admiral Bernard Collard, the commander of the 1st Battle Squadron. The situation was ultimately resolved by Admiral Sir Roger Keyes removing all three from their posts.

The ships remained in the Atlantic until 1927, when they once again transferred to the Mediterranean. The Revenges and Queen Elizabeths again traded places in 1935, and the five Revenge-class ships were present for the Coronation Review for George VI on 20 May 1937. Throughout this period, the ships underwent repeated refits as anti-aircraft suites were upgraded so that each ship had a pair of HACS Mk III systems in lieu of their anti-aircraft control positions, except for Ramillies which received Mk I directors, and QF four-inch Mk XVI AA guns in twin mounts replaced the single Mk V guns. They also received light AA guns for the first time in the form of two octuple two-pounder (40 mm (1.6 in)) Mk VIII "pom-pom" mounts, each with their own directors, and a pair of quadruple Vickers 0.5 in (12.7 mm) AA machinegun mounts. The submerged torpedo tubes were removed as was all of the torpedo-control equipment. Royal Oak was the exception as she had her submerged tubes replaced by above-water tubes. She was also the only ship to receive additional armour when 4-inch plates were added to the deck over her magazines and 2.5-inch (64 mm) over her engine rooms. This armour increased her displacement by 900 long tons (910 t). The Royal Sovereigns did not, however, receive the same extensive reconstructions that some of the Queen Elizabeth-class ships underwent, as the modernization program was interrupted by the outbreak of the Second World War in 1939. The war also forced the cancellation of a plan to add the same armour to Royal Sovereign and Ramillies.

=== Second World War ===
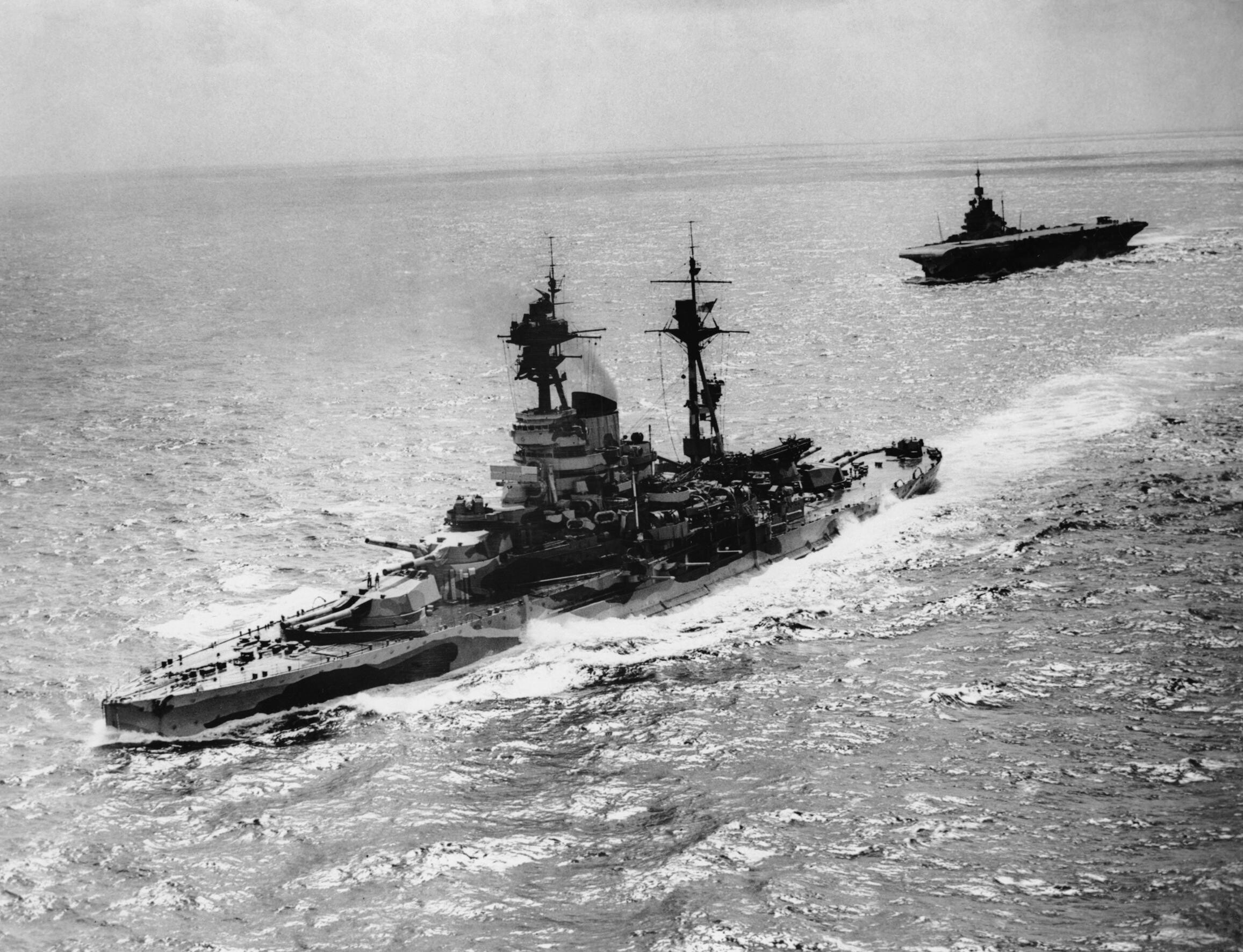
Resolution and the aircraft carrier Formidable sailing in the Indian Ocean in 1942–1943

With the start of war in August 1939, Revenge and Resolution were assigned to the Channel Force, based in Portland, while Royal Sovereign served with the Home Fleet. Ramillies was by this time at Alexandria, Egypt, where she remained until early October, when she was sent to search for the German heavy cruiser Admiral Graf Spee in the Indian Ocean. At the same time, Resolution and Revenge were sent to the South Atlantic Command to participate in the hunt for Admiral Graf Spee, but before they arrived they were sent to the North Atlantic Escort Force to cover convoys from Canada to Britain. They carried gold bullion to Canada to safeguard it during the war during this period. Royal Oak remained in Scapa Flow during this period, and on 14 October, the U-boat U-47 broke through the harbour defences and torpedoed Royal Oak, sinking her at her mooring and killing 833. Ramillies covered troop convoys from Australia to Egypt, including those that carried the 2nd New Zealand Expeditionary Force and the Second Australian Imperial Force in late 1939 and early 1940.

Resolution took part in the Norwegian Campaign, seeing action at the Battles of Narvik in April 1940. The following month she was struck by a German bomb, but was not seriously damaged. Also in May, Ramillies was assigned to the Mediterranean Fleet in anticipation of Italy's entry into the war. The following month, Resolution had joined Force H, and on 3 July she participated in the destruction of the French Fleet at Mers-el-Kebir. Following the Italian declaration of war, Ramillies bombarded Italian positions in Italian Libya in mid-August. In September, Resolution steamed south to Dakar with Force H to neutralise French warships there, but during the Battle of Dakar, she was torpedoed and badly damaged by a French submarine. In October, Revenge bombarded the port of Cherbourg in occupied France to destroy German supplies being assembled for the planned invasion of Britain, Operation Sealion. Ramillies was present with the convoy that was attacked by Italian warships during the Battle of Cape Spartivento in late November but she was not involved in the battle.

Wartime changes to the battleships were generally limited to augmenting their deck armour, their anti-aircraft suites and the addition of radars. Each ship received a pair of quadruple two-pounder mounts and anywhere from 10 (Revenge and Resolution) to 42 (Royal Sovereign) 20-millimetre (0.8 in) Oerlikon guns. Radars were added beginning in 1941, including early-warning, search and fire-control systems. Armour plates 2 inches (51 mm) thick were added over the magazines on Resolution, Royal Sovereign and, partially, in Ramillies in 1941–1942. To increase the accommodation available for the greatly-enlarged wartime crew, the four forward six-inch guns were removed from each ship in 1943, except for Resolution, which only lost two guns.

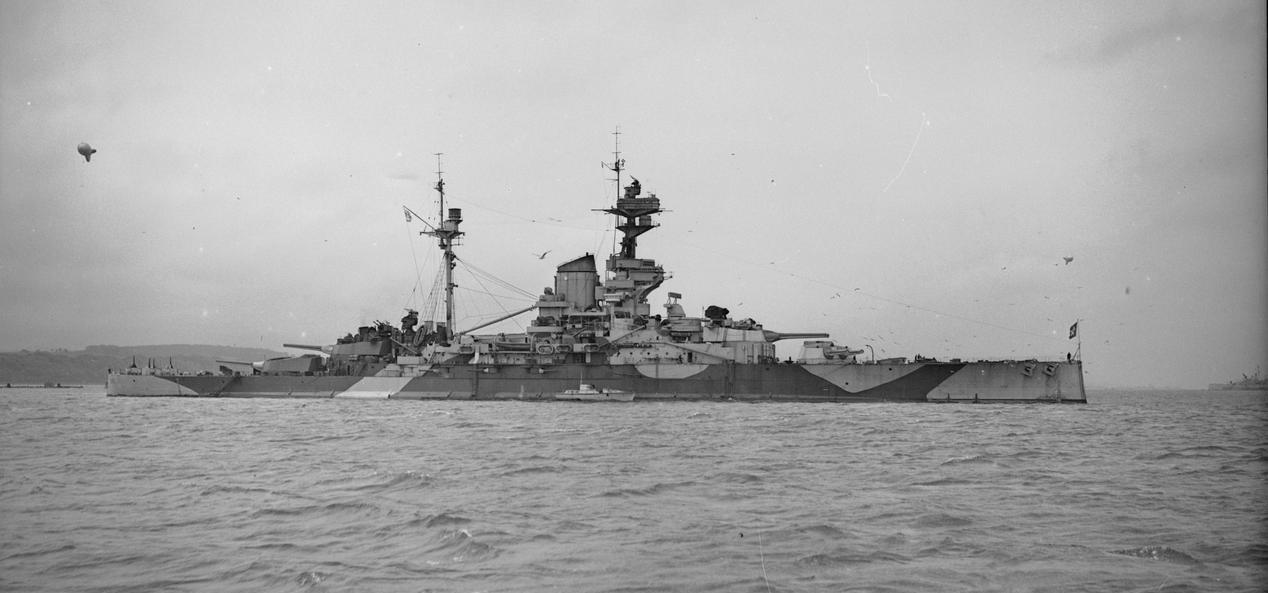
Royal Sovereign as Arkhangelsk in Soviet service

In late 1940, Revenge and Royal Sovereign returned to convoy escort duties in the North Atlantic, and Ramillies joined them in January 1941 after completing a refit. During this period, Ramillies discouraged the two German Scharnhorst-class battleships from attacking a convoy she escorted. Revenge and Ramillies were at sea during Operation Rheinübung, the sortie of the German battleship Bismarck in May and they joined the hunt for the ship, but did not locate her. Resolution spent much of 1941 under repair, first in Freetown, West Africa and then the United States. Late in the year, the Admiralty decided to deploy the four Revenge-class ships to the Far East as the 3rd Battle Squadron in anticipation of war with Japan. They arrived in early 1942, by which time the Japanese had already declared war and inflicted a string of defeats on the Allied countries in the region. The ships fled in advance of the Japanese Indian Ocean raid, as they were no match for the aircraft carriers of the powerful 1st Air Fleet. The battleships thereafter primarily operated off the coast of Africa, escorting troop convoys. Ramillies was present during the Battle of Madagascar in May, where she was torpedoed by a Japanese submarine. She was repaired first in Durban, South Africa, and then Devonport.

In late 1943, Revenge and Resolution were recalled to Britain, owing to their poor condition; the former carried Prime Minister Winston Churchill part of the way to the Tehran Conference in November and December while the latter underwent a refit. Both ships were then decommissioned and assigned to the Portsmouth Command; Resolution joined the training establishment HMS Imperieuse, while Revenge remained out of service. In January 1944, Royal Sovereign and Ramillies were also recalled; Ramillies was refitted and assigned to the fire support force for the invasion of Normandy; Revenge and Resolution were disarmed to provide spare barrels for this work. Royal Sovereign was transferred to the Soviet Navy as Arkhangelsk to reinforce the fleet covering convoys to the Soviet Union in the Arctic Ocean. Revenge and Resolution were sold for scrap in 1948 and were dismantled at Inverkeithing and Faslane, respectively. Ramillies went to the breakers' yard at Cairnryan, also in 1948. Royal Sovereign was returned to Britain in 1949 in poor condition as a result of being poorly maintained in Soviet service; her turrets were jammed and much of her equipment was unusable. The last surviving member of the class, she was sold for scrap that year and broken up at Inverkeithing.

== See also ==
- Project Catherine
