= HMS Imperieuse (training establishment) =

Coordinates: 50.383°N 4.183°W

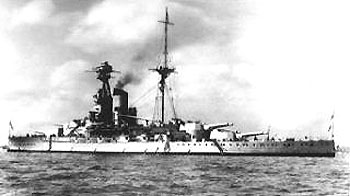
- HMS Resolution, one of the first ships to join the establishment

History

United Kingdom
- Name: HMS Imperieuse
- Commissioned: 12 May 1944
- Decommissioned: 1 June 1948
- Fate: Decommissioned and operational elements dispersed

General characteristics
- Class & type: Training establishment

HMS Imperieuse was the name given to a floating training establishment of the Royal Navy during the Second World War.

== History ==
There had been a previous floating establishment known as HMS Imperieuse. This was the old ironclad HMS Audacious, which had borne the name whilst serving as a repair and store ship alternately at Scapa Flow and Rosyth between 1914 and 1920. The second establishment was commissioned as HMS Imperieuse I on 12 May 1944 as the base of the Naval Officer in Charge at Gareloch, and a stokers' training establishment. Also established that day was HMS Imperieuse II, which was the name given to two obsolete Revenge-class battleships, HMS Resolution and HMS Revenge. They had previously been laid up at Southampton as stokers' training ship under the name HMS Shrapnel II.

The two ships spent a brief period at Gareloch before it was decided by the Admiralty to move the establishment to Devonport. The ships reverted to being Revenge and Resolution for the tow, and arrived at Devonport on 11 December 1944. They were commissioned that day as HMS Imperieuse, but retained their individual names. They were later joined by a number of other ships that had been reduced from active duty. These included the battlecruiser HMS Renown, the battleship HMS Valiant, the aircraft carrier HMS Unicorn and the light cruiser HMS Newfoundland. These were all jointly commissioned as HMS Imperieuse on 21 June 1946, but the ships retained their individual names.

The ships were reduced to the reserve by October 1947, with the exception of HMS Newfoundland which was transferred for refitting to become flagship of the 4th Cruiser Squadron. The facility's role was transferred to HMS Raleigh on 10 March 1948 and HMS Imperieuse was paid off on 1 June 1948.

== Bibliography ==
- Colledge, J. J.; Warlow, Ben (2006) [1969]. Ships of the Royal Navy: The Complete Record of All Fighting Ships of the Royal Navy from the 15th Century to the Present (3rd Rev ed.). London: Chatham Publishing. ISBN 978-1-86176-281-8. OCLC 67375475.
- Warlow, Ben. Shore Establishments of the Royal Navy, Liskeard: Maritime, 2000. ISBN 978-0-907771-73-9
