= HMS Resolution (09) =

1916 Revenge-class battleship of the Royal Navy

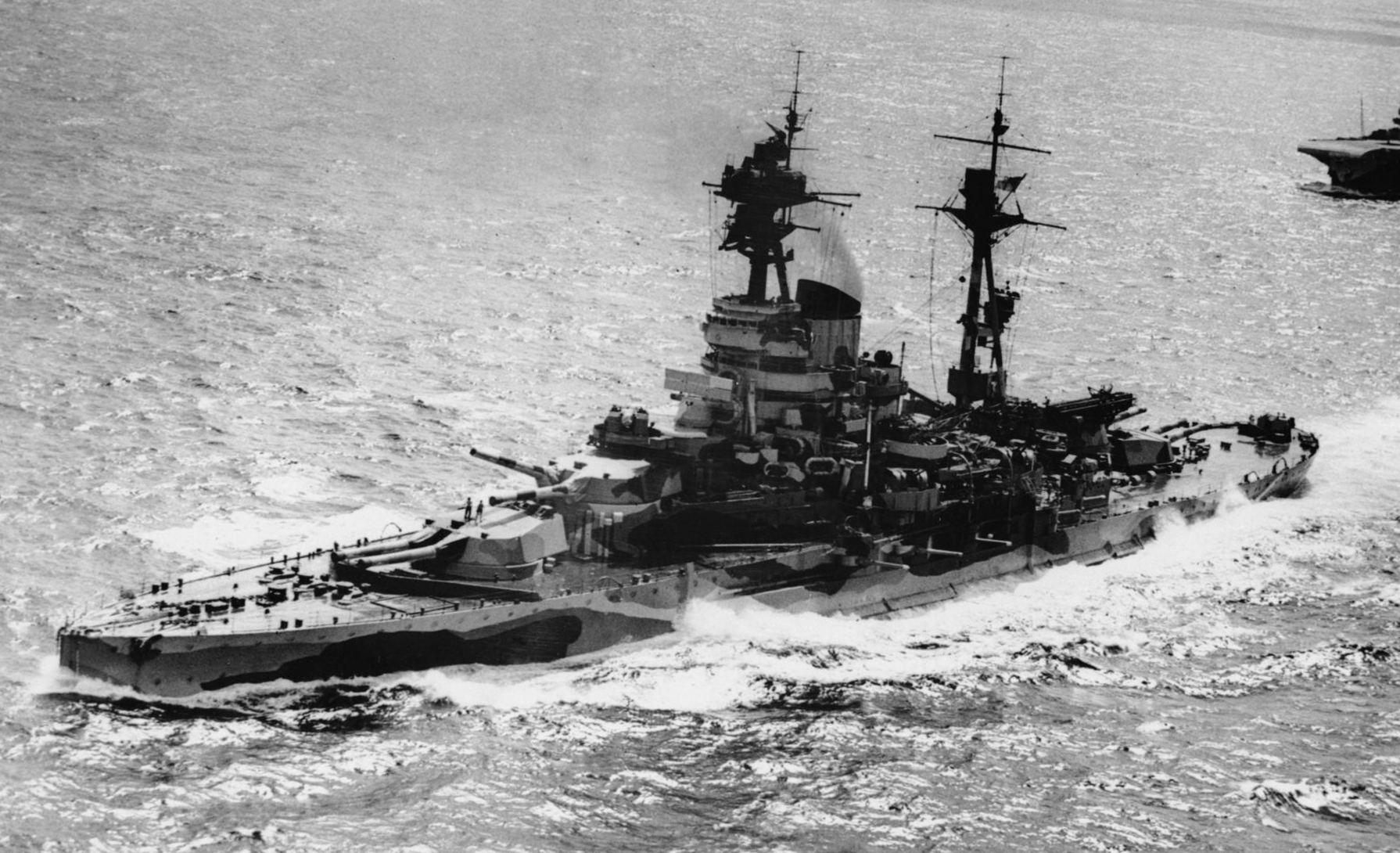
- Resolution in the Indian Ocean in 1942–1943

History

United Kingdom
- Name: Resolution
- Builder: Palmers Shipbuilding and Iron Company, Jarrow
- Laid down: 29 November 1913
- Launched: 14 January 1915
- Commissioned: 30 December 1916
- Identification: Pennant number: 09
- Fate: Sold for scrap, 5 May 1948

General characteristics (as built)
- Class & type: Revenge-class battleship
- Displacement: 25,750 long tons (26,163 t); 31,130 long tons (31,630 t) (deep load)
- Length: 620 ft 7 in (189.2 m)
- Beam: 88 ft 6 in (27 m)
- Draught: 33 ft 7 in (10.2 m) (deep load)
- Installed power: 18 Yarrow boilers; 40,000 shp (30,000 kW)
- Propulsion: 4 shafts; 4 steam turbine sets
- Speed: 22 knots (41 km/h; 25 mph)
- Range: 7,000 nmi (12,960 km; 8,060 mi) at 10 knots (19 km/h; 12 mph)
- Crew: 910
- Armament: 4 × twin 15 in (381 mm) guns; 14 × single 6 in (152 mm) guns; 2 × single 3 in (76 mm) AA guns; 4 × single 3-pdr (47 mm (1.9 in)) guns; 4 × 21 in (533 mm) torpedo tubes
- Armour: Waterline belt: 13 in (330 mm); Deck: 1–4 in (25–102 mm); Barbettes: 6–10 in (152–254 mm); Gun turrets: 11–13 in (279–330 mm); Conning tower: 3–11 in (76–279 mm); Bulkheads: 6 in (152 mm)

HMS Resolution (pennant number: 09) was one of five Revenge-class battleships built for the Royal Navy during the First World War. Completed in December 1916, Resolution saw no combat during the war as both the British and German fleets adopted a more cautious strategy after the Battle of Jutland in May owing to the increasing threat of naval mines and submarines.

Resolution spent the 1920s and 1930s alternating between the Atlantic Fleet and the Mediterranean Fleet. Whilst serving in the Mediterranean in the early 1920s, the ship went to Turkey twice in response to crises arising from the Greco-Turkish War, including the Great Fire of Smyrna in 1922. She also saw limited involvement during the Franco-British intervention in the Russian Civil War in the Black Sea in 1920. The ship's interwar career was otherwise uneventful. With the outbreak of the Second World War in September 1939, Resolution was assigned to the Channel Force before being transferred to convoy escort duties in the North Atlantic. In May 1940, she participated in the Battles of Narvik until German air attacks drove her off.

In June 1940, the ship was transferred to Force H, where she took part in the destruction of the French Fleet at Mers-el-Kebir in July after the French surrender to Germany. She was also involved in the Battle of Dakar, an attempt to neutralise the French battleship Richelieu that ended with Resolution's torpedoing by the French submarine Bévéziers. Badly damaged, Resolution was repaired first in Freetown, Sierra Leone, and then the Philadelphia Naval Shipyard under Lend-Lease. Thereafter assigned to the Eastern Fleet, her age kept her from seeing action against the Japanese fleet, and she instead escorted convoys off the eastern coast of Africa. She returned to Britain in September 1943 and was decommissioned. Thereafter she saw service with the training establishment HMS Imperieuse, a role she filled until February 1948, when she was paid off, sold for scrap and broken up at Faslane.

== Design and description ==
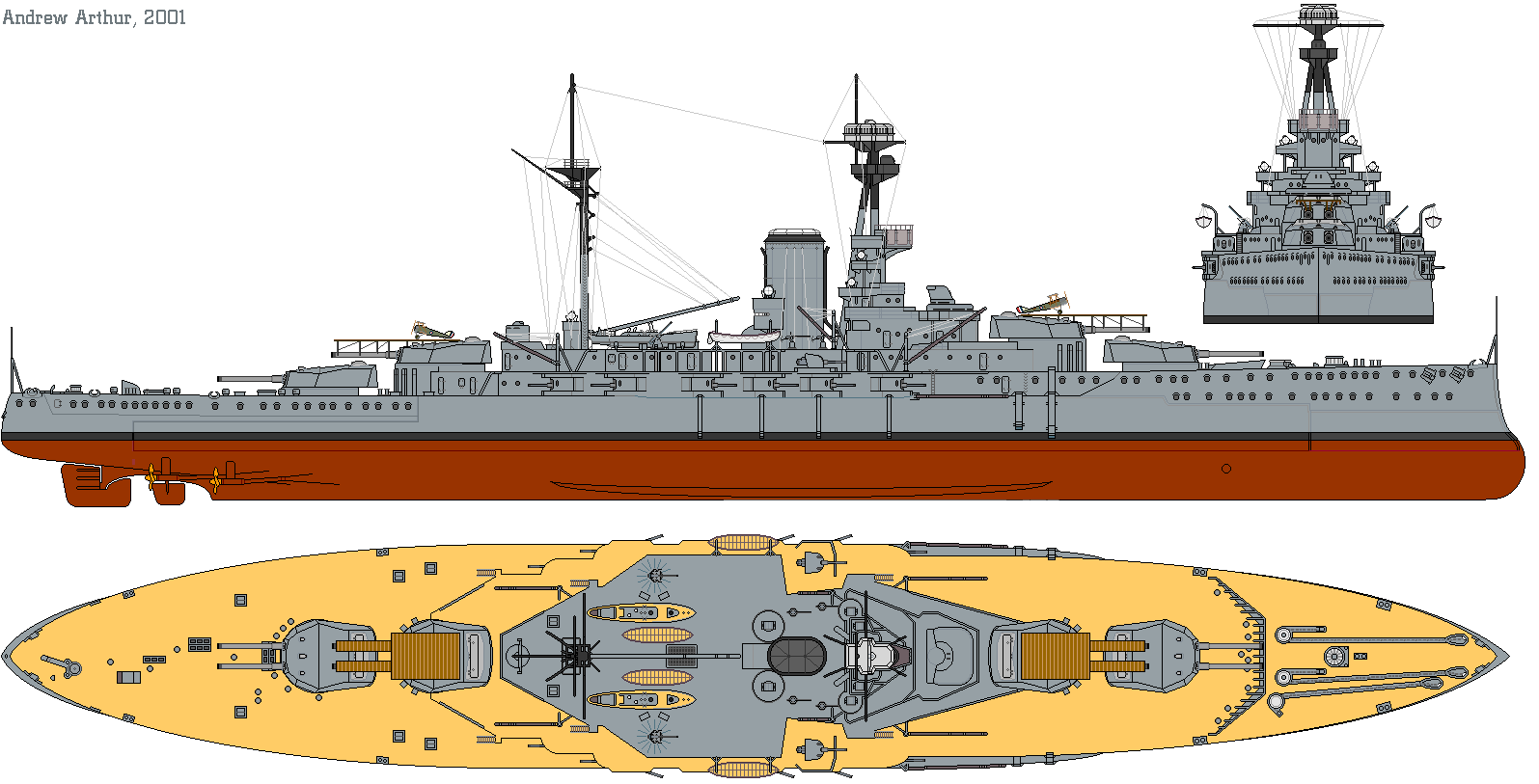
Illustration of sister ship HMS Revenge as she appeared in 1916

The Revenge-class battleships were designed as slightly smaller, slower, and more heavily protected versions of the preceding Queen Elizabeth-class battleships. As an economy measure they were intended to revert to the previous practice of using both fuel oil and coal, but First Sea Lord Jackie Fisher rescinded the decision for coal in October 1914. Still under construction, the ships were redesigned to employ oil-fired boilers that increased the power of the engines by 9,000 shaft horsepower (6,700 kW) over the original specification.

Resolution had a length overall of 620 feet 7 inches (189.2 m), a beam of 88 feet 6 inches (27.0 m) and a deep draught of 33 feet 7 inches (10.2 m). She had a designed displacement of 25,750 long tons (26,163 t) and displaced 31,130 long tons (31,630 t) at deep load. She was powered by two pairs of Parsons steam turbines, each driving two shafts, using steam from eighteen Yarrow boilers. The turbines were rated at 40,000 shp (30,000 kW) and intended to give the ship a maximum speed of 23 knots (42.6 km/h; 26.5 mph). During her sea trials on 22 May 1916, the ship only reached a top speed of 22 knots (41 km/h; 25 mph) from 40,360 shp (30,100 kW). She had a range of 7,000 nautical miles (12,964 km; 8,055 mi) at a cruising speed of 10 knots (18.5 km/h; 11.5 mph). Her crew numbered 910 officers and ratings in 1916. Her metacentric height was 3.4 feet (1.0 m) at deep load.

The Revenge class was equipped with eight breech-loading (BL) 15-inch (381 mm) Mk I guns in four twin gun turrets, in two superfiring pairs fore and aft of the superstructure, designated 'A', 'B', 'X', and 'Y' from front to rear. Twelve of the fourteen BL 6-inch (152 mm) Mk XII guns were mounted singly in casemates along the broadside of the vessel amidships; the remaining pair were mounted on the shelter deck and were protected by gun shields. The ship also mounted four 3-pounder (47-millimetre (1.9 in)) guns. Her anti-aircraft (AA) armament consisted of two quick-firing (QF) 3-inch (76 mm) 20 cwt Mk I (Note: "Cwt" is the abbreviation for hundredweight, 20 cwt referring to the weight of the gun.) guns. She was fitted with four submerged 21 inch (533 mm) torpedo tubes, two on each broadside.

Resolution was completed with two fire-control directors fitted with 15-foot (4.6 m) rangefinders. One was mounted above the conning tower, protected by an armoured hood, and the other was in the spotting top above the tripod foremast. Each turret was also fitted with a 15-foot rangefinder. The main armament could be controlled by 'X' turret as well. The secondary armament was primarily controlled by directors mounted on each side of the compass platform on the foremast once they were fitted in April 1917. A torpedo-control director with a 15-foot rangefinder was mounted at the aft end of the superstructure.

The ship's waterline belt consisted of Krupp cemented armour (KC) that was 13 inches (330 mm) thick between 'A' and 'Y' barbettes and thinned to 4 to 6 inches (102 to 152 mm) towards the ship's ends, but did not reach either the bow or the stern. Above this was a strake of armour 6 inches thick that extended between 'A' and 'X' barbettes. Transverse bulkheads 4 to 6 inches thick ran at an angle from the ends of the thickest part of the waterline belt to 'A' and 'Y' barbettes. The gun turrets were protected by 11 to 13 inches (279 to 330 mm) of KC armour, except for the turret roofs which were 4.75–5 inches (121–127 mm) thick. The barbettes ranged in thickness from 6–10 inches (152–254 mm) above the upper deck, but were only 4 to 6 inches thick below it. The Revenge-class ships had multiple armoured decks that ranged from 1 to 4 inches (25 to 102 mm) in thickness. The main conning tower had 13 inches of armour on the sides with a 3-inch roof. The torpedo director in the rear superstructure had 6 inches of armour protecting it. After the Battle of Jutland, 1 inch of high-tensile steel was added to the main deck over the magazines and additional anti-flash equipment was added in the magazines.

The ship was fitted with flying-off platforms mounted on the roofs of 'B' and 'X' turrets in 1918, from which fighters and reconnaissance aircraft could launch. In 1927 a rotating aircraft catapult was installed on Resolution's quarterdeck. It was removed during her 1929–1931 refit. The flying-off platforms were removed in 1932–1933. A catapult was added on the roof of 'X' turret by September 1936 as well as a crane to handle the aircraft.

=== Major alterations ===
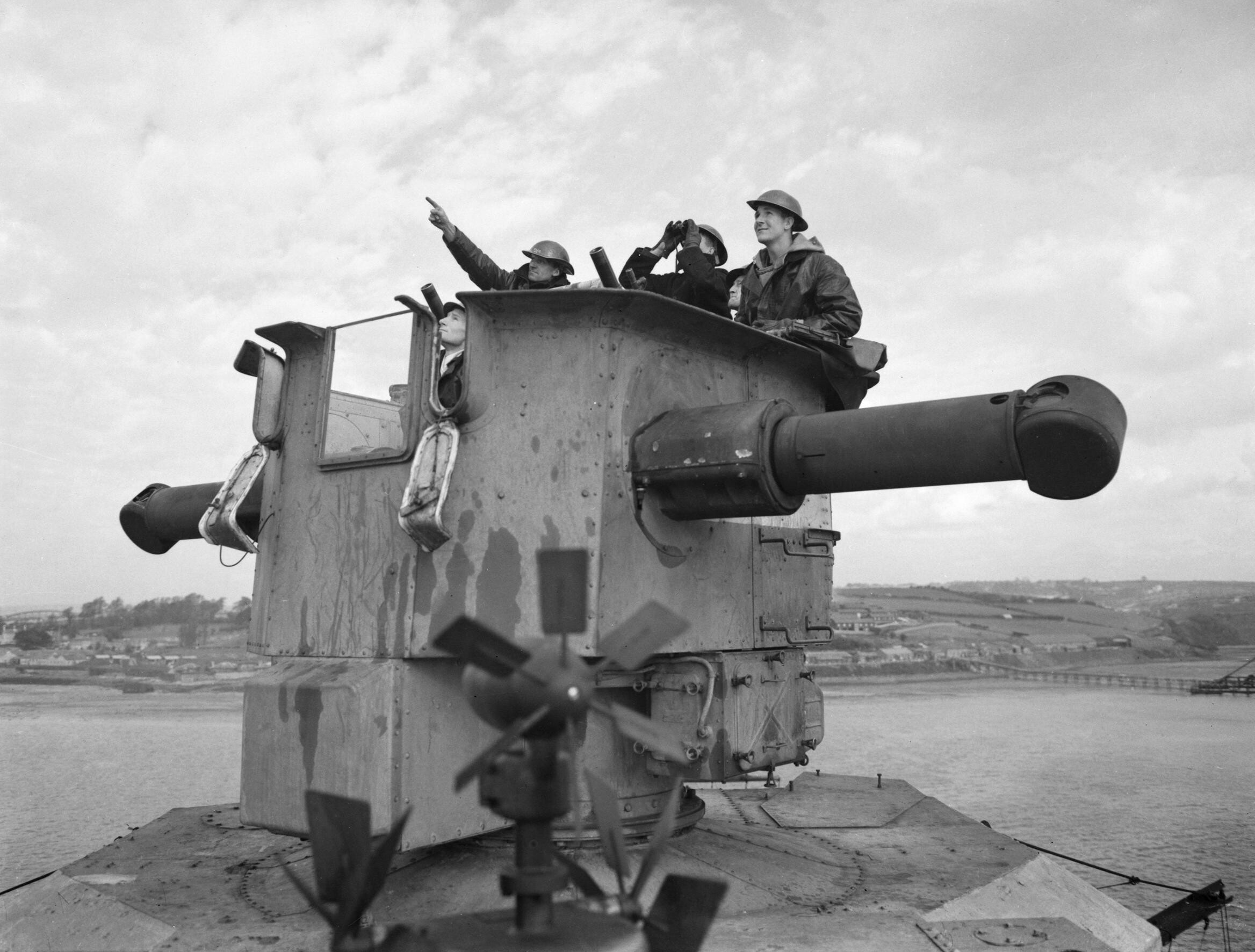
Sister ship Revenge's forward HACS Mk III director and its crew in 1940

Resolution was fitted with anti-torpedo bulges between late 1917 and May 1918. They were designed to reduce the effect of torpedo detonations and improve stability. They increased her beam by over 13 feet (4 m) to 101 feet 6 inches (30.9 m), her displacement to 32,820 long tons (33,347 t) and reduced her draught to 31 feet 11 inches (9.7 m), all at deep load. They increased her metacentric height to 5.1 feet (1.6 m). Later in 1918, a 30-foot (9.1 m) rangefinder was fitted in 'B' turret.

The gun shields for the shelter-deck six-inch guns were replaced by armoured casemates in 1922. Two years later, her anti-aircraft defences were upgraded by replacing the original three-inch AA guns with a pair of QF four-inch (102 mm) AA guns. Another pair of four-inch AA guns were added and the six-inch guns from the shelter deck were removed in 1927. During the ship's 1929–31 refit, a High-Angle Control System (HACS) Mk I director was installed on the spotting top and the aft pair of torpedo tubes on either side were also removed. An experimental 4-inch dual-purpose, twin-gun turret was installed in the place of the starboard forward AA gun for evaluation.

By September 1933 a pair of quadruple mounts for Vickers .50 machine guns were added abreast the conning tower. Three years later a HACS Mk II director replaced the Mk I on the roof of the spotting top. A platform for another director was added on the mainmast which was converted into a tripod to handle the additional weight. The torpedo director and its associated rangefinder were removed. In January 1938 the rear HACS was added, the existing AA guns were replaced with QF 4-inch Mk XVI guns in Mk XIX twin mounts and a pair of octuple mounts for two-pounder Mk VIII "pom-pom" guns were added with their directors. The forward pair of submerged torpedo tubes were also removed.

Wartime modifications for the Revenge-class ships were fairly minimal. In 1941 Resolution was fitted with a Type 279 early-warning radar and a pair of Type 285 anti-aircraft gunnery sets. The following year a Type 273 surface-search radar and a pair of Type 284 gunnery radars for the main guns were added. The quadruple .50-calibre mounts were replaced by nine 20 mm Oerlikons in September 1941. Two four-barrel "pom-poms" were added as in 1942 as well as another Oerlikon. To save weight and make more room available for the additional crew required to man the new equipment like the radars and Oerlikons, two 6-inch guns were removed in 1943.

== Construction and service ==
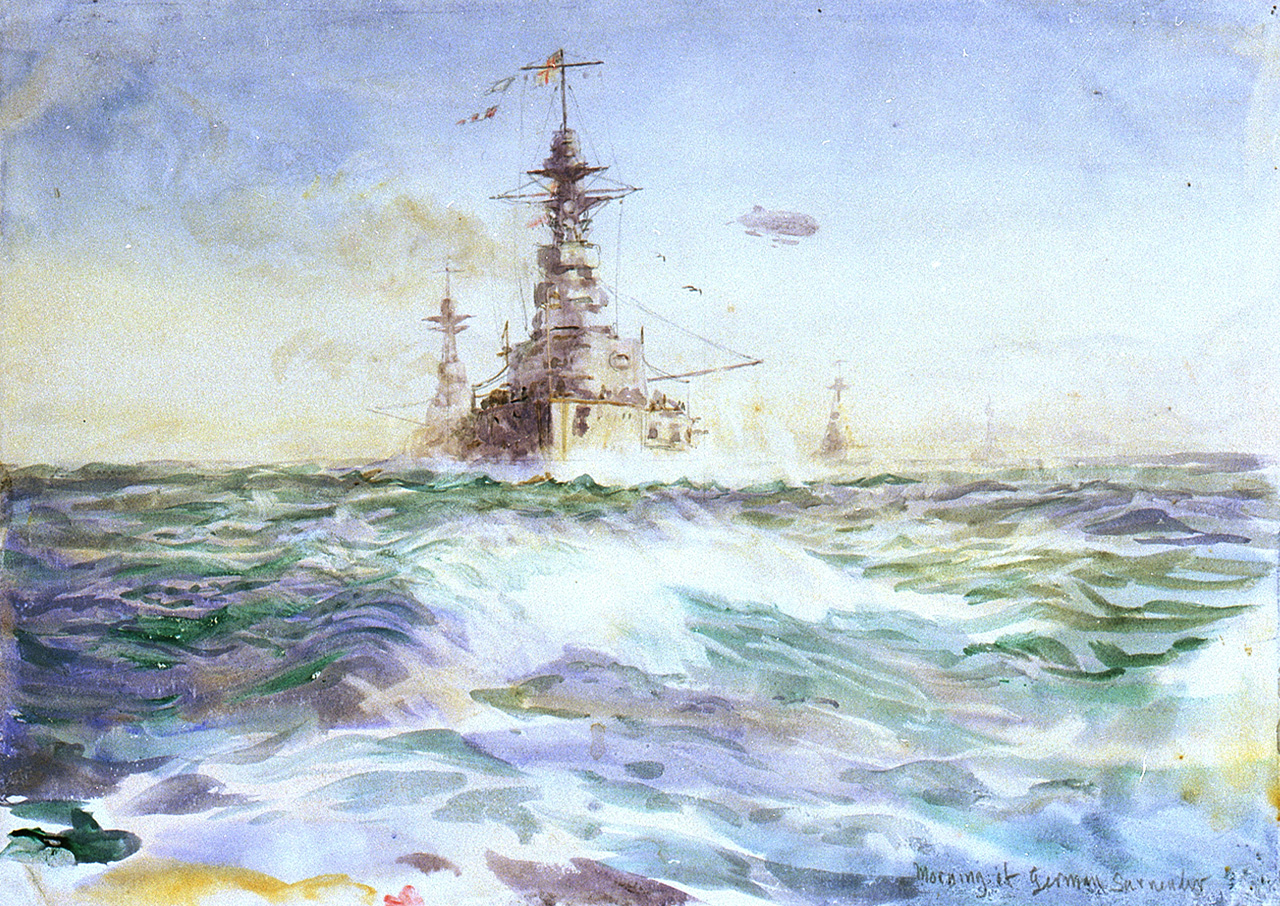
Resolution and the rest of 1st Battle Squadron during the surrender of the German fleet on 21 November

=== First World War ===
Resolution was laid down at Palmers Shipbuilding and Iron Company, Jarrow on 29 November 1913, launched on 14 January 1915, and commissioned on 7 December 1916. On 30 December, she joined the Grand Fleet in Rosyth, assigned to the 1st Battle Squadron along with her sister ships and several other battleships. After the action of 19 August 1916, in which the Grand Fleet had lost two light cruisers to German U-boat attacks, Admiral John Jellicoe, the fleet commander, decided that the fleet should not be risked in further such sorties unless the German High Seas Fleet ventured north or the strategic situation warranted the risk. For its part, the German fleet remained in port or trained in the Baltic Sea through 1917, as both sides had largely abandoned the idea of a decisive surface battle in the North Sea. Both sides turned to positional warfare, laying fields of naval mines, and Germany resumed the unrestricted submarine warfare campaign early in the year. As a result, Resolution and the rest of the Grand Fleet saw no action during this period.

In 1917, Britain began running regular convoys to Norway, escorted by light forces; the Germans raided these convoys twice late in the year, prompting Admiral David Beatty, who had replaced Jellicoe the previous year, to send battle squadrons of the Grand Fleet to escort the convoys. The High Seas Fleet went to sea on 23 April to attack one of the escorted convoys, but after the battlecruiser SMS Moltke suffered a serious mechanical accident the next day, the Germans were forced to break off the operation. Resolution and the rest of the Grand Fleet sortied on 24 April once they intercepted wireless signals from the damaged Moltke, but the Germans were too far ahead of the British, and no shots were fired. On 21 November 1918, following the Armistice, the entire Grand Fleet left port to escort the surrendered German fleet into internment at Scapa Flow.

=== Interwar years ===
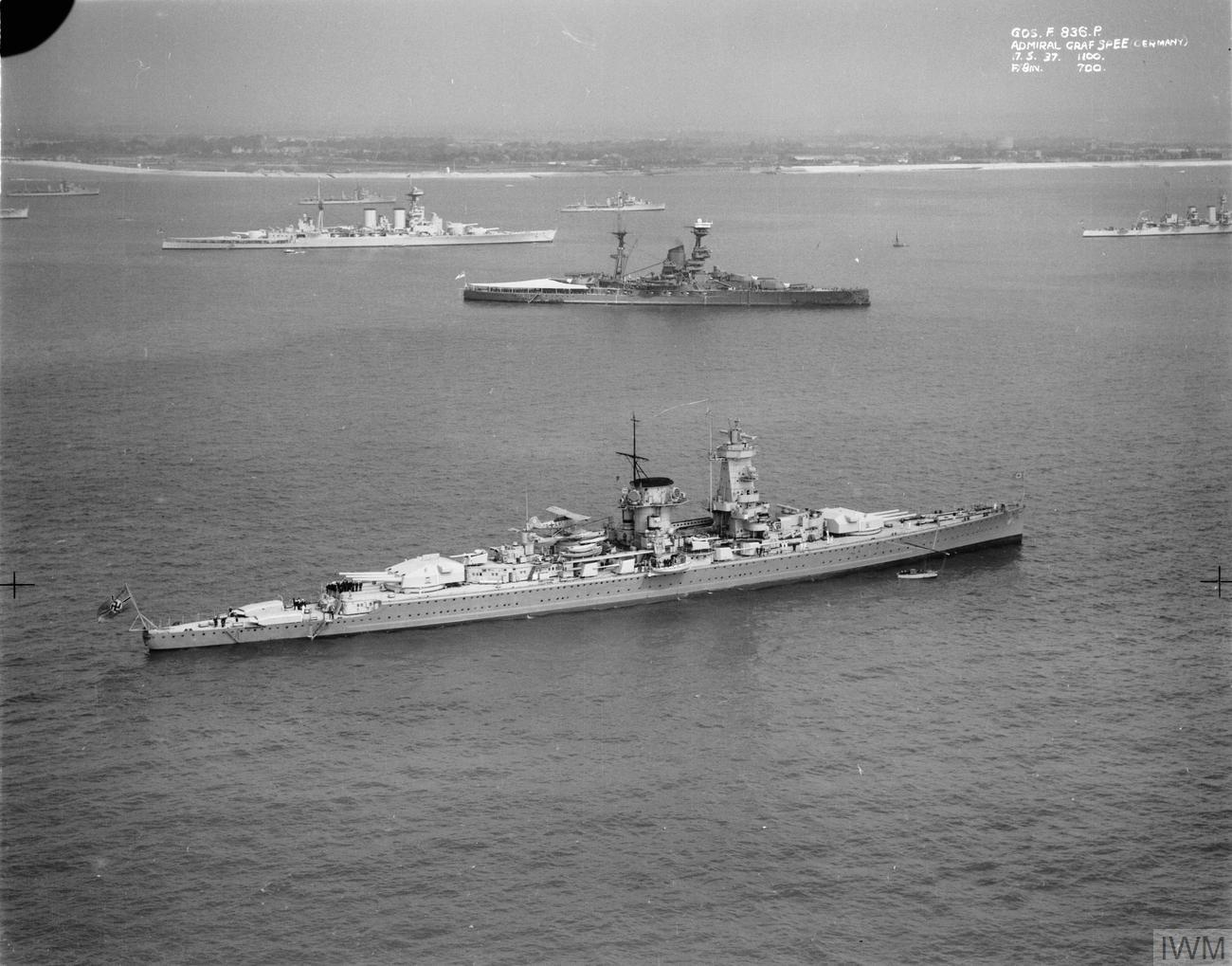
At Spithead during a fleet review in 1937; the German cruiser Admiral Graf Spee (foreground), Resolution (centre), and HMS Hood (background)

Throughout the 1920s and 1930s, Resolution typically operated with her sister ships, apart from periods where they were detached for refit or modernisation. In April 1919, the ships were transferred to the Atlantic Fleet, still as part of the 1st Battle Squadron. They were then attached to the Mediterranean Fleet for operations in Turkey and the Black Sea as part of Britain's responses to the Greco-Turkish War and the Russian Civil War, respectively. On 10 April, the ship arrived in Constantinople from Malta, and two days later she and several other ships went to Prinkipo to conduct gunnery training. Resolution then went to Batumi in southern Russia, where she remained until mid-June, when she steamed back across the Black Sea to Constantinople, arriving on 18 June. The ship was then stationed in Chanak, along with her sister Royal Oak and the light cruiser Ceres. The two battleships embarked passengers and casualties bound for Britain before sailing for home waters, in company with a pair of destroyers.

In August 1920, the ships returned to the Atlantic Fleet. The 1st and 2nd Battle Squadrons merged in May 1921, with the Resolution and her four sisters forming the 1st Division and the five Queen Elizabeth-class battleships forming the 2nd Division. Resolution and three of her sisters were again sent to the Mediterranean Fleet in September 1922 during a crisis in Smyrna that culminated in the Great fire of Smyrna as the Greco-Turkish War came to its conclusion. The ships primarily operated in the Dardanelles and the Sea of Marmora, though Resolution also stopped in Mytilene and Smyrna in February 1923 in company with the battleship HMS Emperor of India and several cruisers and destroyers. With the war over by November, the ships were free to return once again to the Atlantic Fleet.

On 10 January 1924, while conducting training exercises in the English Channel, Resolution ran into and sank the British submarine HMS L24 as she was surfacing, damaging her bow in the collision. Crewmen aboard Resolution reported feeling a shock at 11:13, but they were unaware that they had struck the submarine; it became clear later that day when the fleet returned to port and L24 was found to be missing. The submarine was sunk with the loss of all hands. From July to October, Resolution underwent a refit. On 1 November, the Atlantic Fleet underwent a reorganisation that saw the Queen Elizabeth-class ships sent to the Mediterranean Fleet and the ships of the 1st Division reconstituted as the 1st Battle Squadron. The ship underwent another, more lengthy refit from December 1926 to December 1927. Resolution and her sisters were transferred to the Mediterranean Fleet in August 1927.

In early 1935, the Revenge and Queen Elizabeth classes again swapped places, though by this time, the Atlantic Fleet had been renamed the Home Fleet. On 16 July, the ships were present during the fleet review at Spithead for King George V's silver jubilee. In December, Resolution again went into drydock for a refit that lasted until September 1936. She and her sisters were again present for the Coronation Review for George VI on 20 May 1937. In the last weeks of August 1939, the Royal Navy began to concentrate in wartime bases as tensions with Germany rose. Resolution steamed to Invergordon, where she joined her sisters Royal Sovereign and Royal Oak, Rodney, and the battlecruiser Repulse. By 31 August, the force joined Nelson, the flagship of Admiral Charles Forbes, the commander of the Home Fleet.

=== Second World War ===
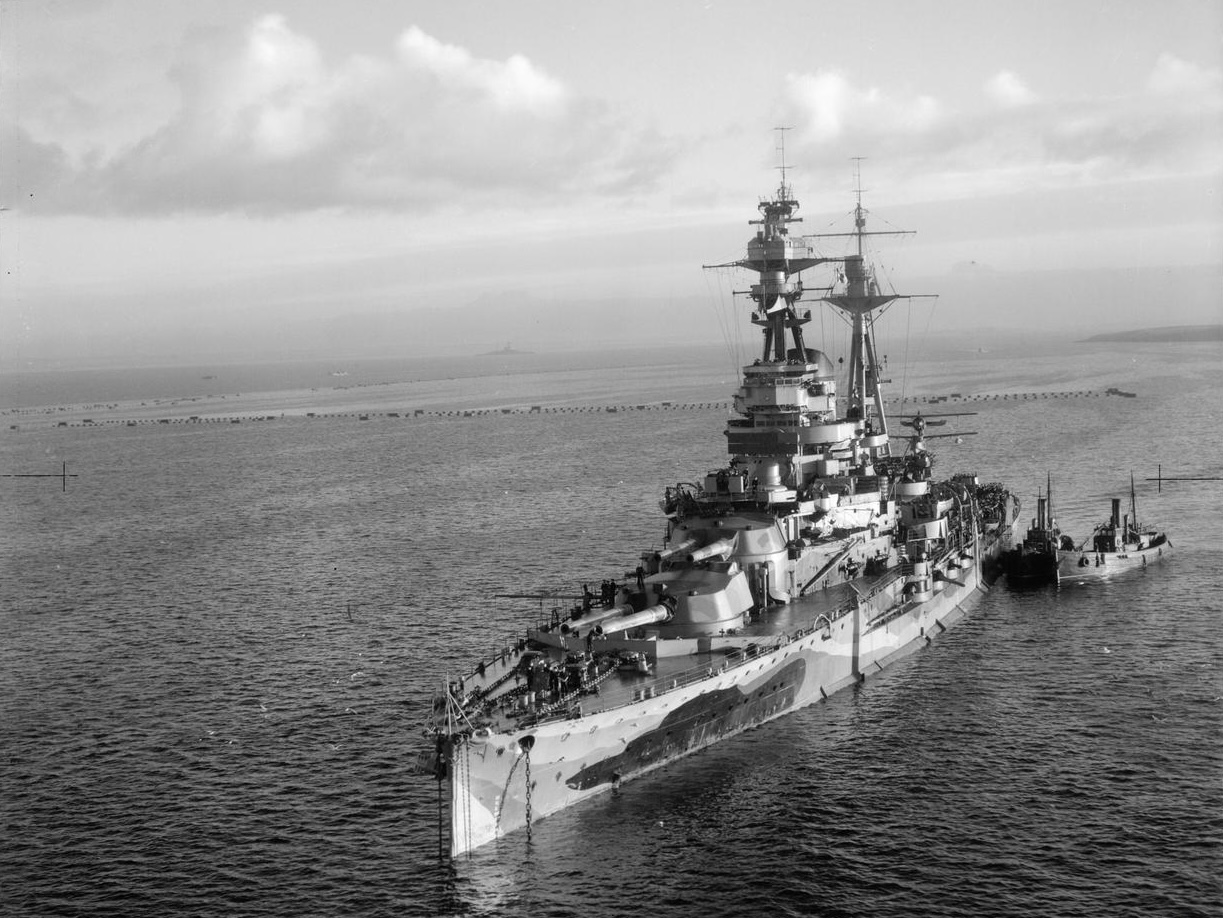
Resolution at anchor during the Second World War

In September 1939, immediately after the start of the Second World War, Resolution was assigned to the Channel Force, based in Portland. On 1 October, after the German heavy cruiser Admiral Graf Spee sank the merchant vessel SS Clement, the Admiralty ordered Resolution to join the South Atlantic Command, but rescinded the order four days later. Resolution was instead sent to the North Atlantic Escort Force in company with Revenge. She carried a load of gold bullion to Canada to safeguard it during the war, and thereafter escorted convoys of troopships from Canada to Britain through December 1939. She escorted the first major troop convoy starting on 12 December, in company with the battlecruiser Repulse. The Royal Navy purchased the merchant ship SS Waimana in September and disguised her as Resolution to deceive German aircraft while the battleship was on patrol in the Atlantic, a role she filled until February 1942.

In April 1940, Resolution re-joined the Home Fleet during the campaign in Norway. She was sent to relieve the battleship Warspite off Narvik late that month, arriving on 26 April. The ship and the light cruiser Aurora bombarded German positions around Beisfjord on 1 May. She supported the landing at Bjerkvik on 13 May during the Battles of Narvik. She arrived off Bjerkvik late on 12 May as part of a force that included two cruisers and five destroyers; they made preparations for the attack, which began in the early hours of the following morning. She carried five tanks and other vehicles for the landing, which she hoisted out in the darkness. Three of the tanks were sent in first, and as the German defenders engaged the incoming amphibious assault, Resolution and the cruisers and destroyers shelled German defences in the area. As the men and tanks fought their way inland, the ships conducted a creeping barrage. By 06:00, the troops had secured the town and signaled that Resolution and the rest of the squadron could depart. Later in May she was attacked by German Junkers Ju 88 bombers; she was hit by one 1,000-pound (450 kg) bomb that killed two men and wounded another twenty-seven. On 18 May, she was detached to return to Scapa Flow to prevent her from being damaged by further air attacks.

==== Forces H and M ====
On 4 June, Resolution departed Scapa Flow bound for Gibraltar, where she joined Force H, which also included the battlecruiser Hood and the battleship Valiant. She took part in the destruction of the French Fleet at Mers-el-Kebir on 3 July 1940. Following the French surrender on 22 June, the French fleet was to be disarmed under German and Italian supervision. The British high command, however, was concerned that the French ships would be seized by the Axis powers and placed in service. Prime Minister Winston Churchill therefore ordered Vice Admiral James Somerville, the commander of Force H, to neutralise the French fleet at Mers-el-Kébir. He was instructed to order the French vessels to join the British with the Free French, surrender for internment, to scuttle themselves, or be sunk. On 3 July, Somerville arrived and delivered the ultimatum; the French rejected it, and so the British ships opened fire. Shell hits from Resolution, Valiant, and Hood struck the French battleship Bretagne, destroying her in a magazine explosion, and forced the battleship Dunkerque to run herself aground to avoid sinking. The battleship Provence also sank in shallow water, though she was later refloated.

With the fleet at Mers-el-Kebir neutralised, the naval forces at Dakar became the next target for Force H. The nearly-completed battleship Richelieu, which had fled from Brest, France to escape the advancing German army, was in Dakar and was to be attacked on 6 July. However, Somerville was ordered to return to Mers-el-Kebir to ensure that Dunkerque was in fact destroyed—the attacks carried out by Hood, Valiant, and Ark Royal—granting Richelieu a temporary reprieve. Force H, again including Resolution, was then sent on 8 July to divert the attention of the Italian Regia Marina (Royal Navy) while a Malta convoy steamed to the island. During the operation, the ships made a feint toward Sardinia and Ark Royal launched a raid on Cagliari. Force H next supported Operation Hurry in late July and early August. Following the operation, Resolution and Ark Royal were detached from Force H to finally conduct the attack on Richelieu. The ships joined the battleship Barham, three cruisers, and ten destroyers as Force M, under the command of Admiral Andrew Cunningham.

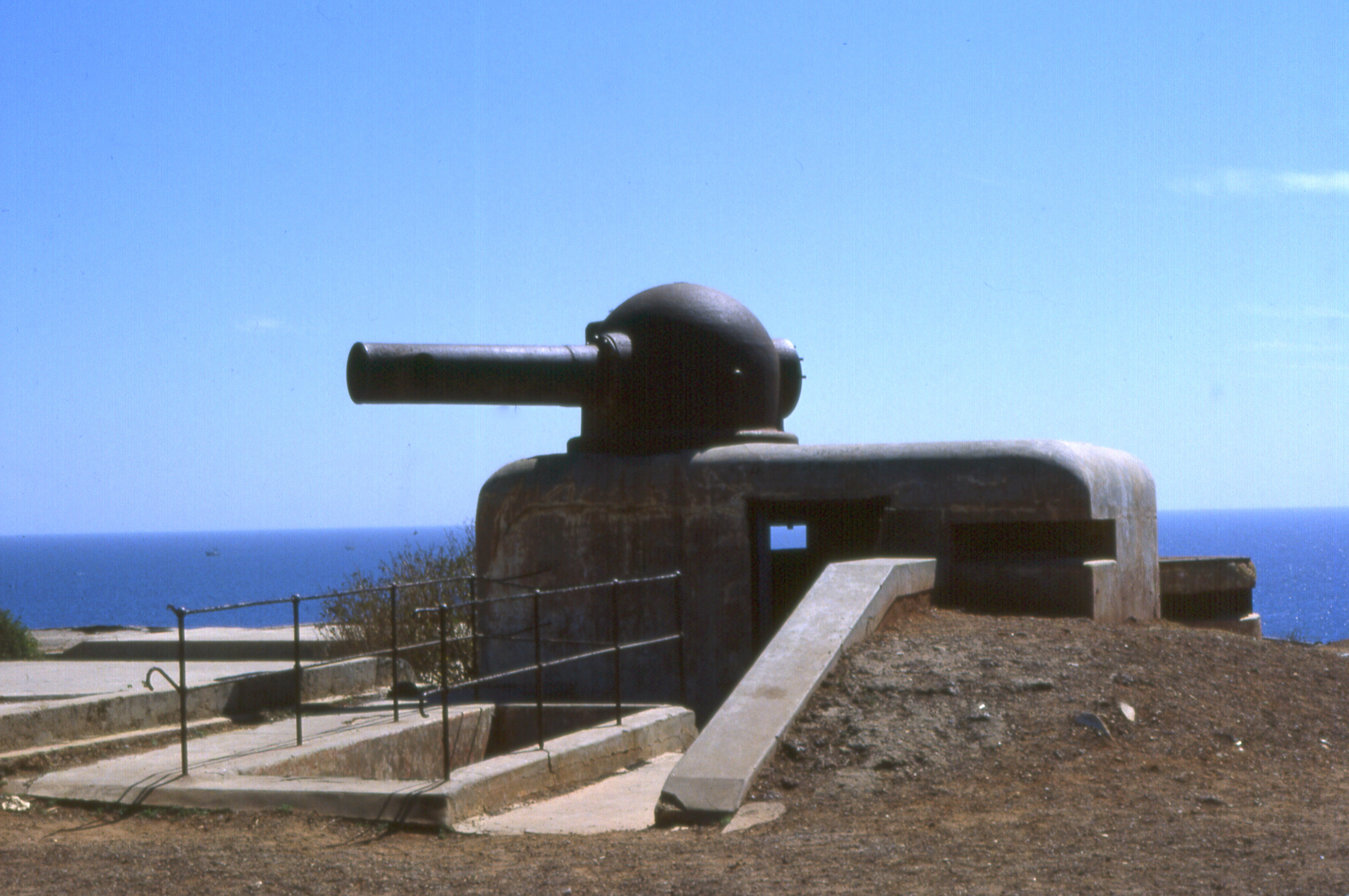
Range-finder of the coastal battery at Dakar that Resolution engaged

On the morning of 23 September, Force M appeared off Dakar and Cunningham issued the French commander the same ultimatum as at Mers-el-Kebir. After the French again refused to surrender or scuttle their ship and began firing on the British fleet, the British ships returned fire, and in the course of about half an hour, Resolution and Barham had fired more than 100 shells from their main battery. Poor visibility hampered their shooting, and between them the two battleships only scored a single hit on a freighter. Unable to effectively engage the French forces in the harbour, Cunningham broke off the attack after several of his ships received serious hits from French coastal batteries. The next day, Cunningham attempted an air strike from Ark Royal, which failed to damage the heavily armoured Richelieu. While they were steaming off the coast, the destroyer Fortune came under attack from a French cruiser, which Resolution drove off with a single broadside of her main battery guns. The battleships then moved into position to attack the port; they scored a single hit on Richelieu, though it was only a splinter from a 15-inch shell that did little damage. Resolution's fire director gear broke down ten minutes into the action, drastically reducing her ability to fire accurately. The British briefly withdrew before attacking again later in the afternoon; Resolution engaged the shore battery while Barham fired on Richelieu. Neither British ship scored any hits, though Resolution was straddled by the coastal guns. Cunningham again disengaged, determined to make another attack the next morning.

The two battleships arrived off Dakar at around 9:00 to launch another attack, this time supported by a pair of heavy cruisers. Just as they were manoeuvring into position, the French submarine Bévéziers launched a spread of torpedoes at the battleships, one of which struck Resolution amidships on her port side. The explosion tore a large hole in her hull and flooded the port boiler room, reducing her to a speed of 12 knots (22 km/h; 14 mph) and causing a serious list to port. Resolution was forced to withdraw, leaving Barham to engage Richelieu by herself. Cunningham escorted the crippled battleship to Freetown for repairs, and the next morning, Barham had to take her under tow. The ships arrived in Freetown on 29 September, where Resolution underwent six months of repairs. She returned to Portsmouth in March 1941, where she came under a German air attack that failed to score any hits. Resolution then crossed the Atlantic to the Philadelphia Naval Shipyard, where she underwent repairs and modernisation under Lend-Lease; the modifications included altering her main battery turrets to allow elevation to 30 degrees, significantly increasing her range. Work completed in September 1941, allowing Resolution to return to action.

==== Eastern Fleet ====
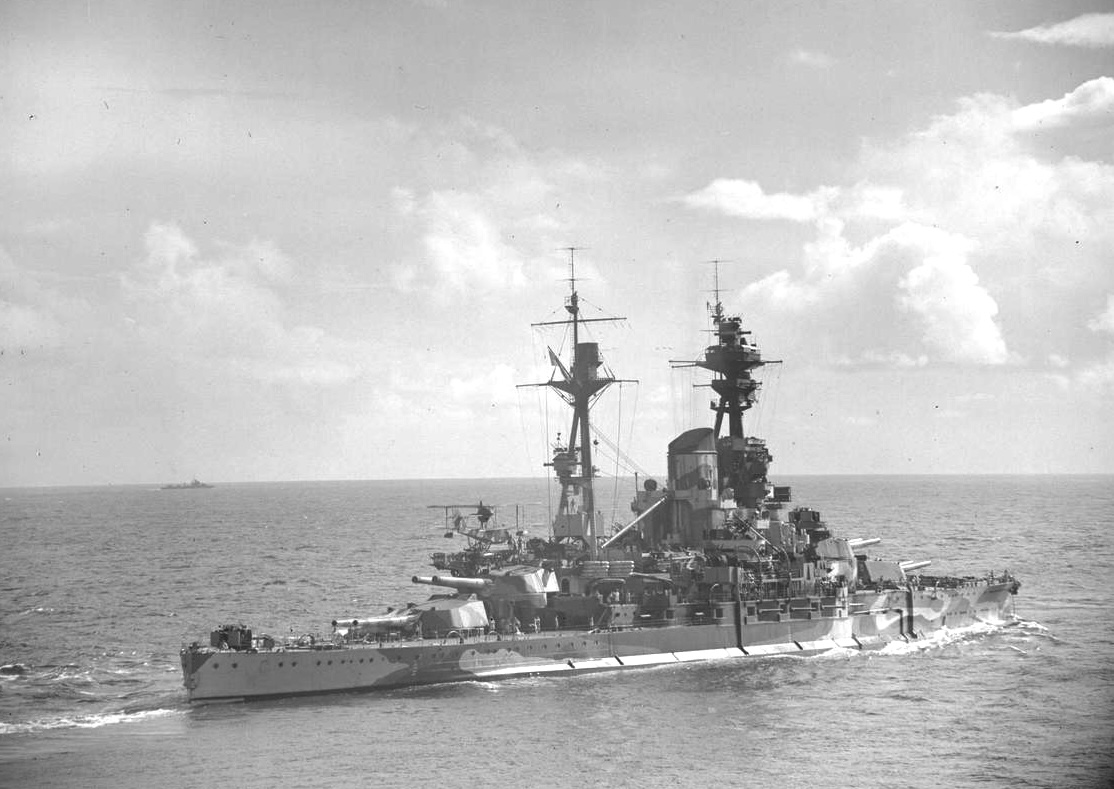
Resolution underway off Madagascar

In early 1942, the Royal Navy began amassing forces to send to the Indian Ocean to defend British India after the start of the Pacific War in December 1941. The ship sailed for Cape Town, where she met the aircraft carrier Formidable; they were later joined by Revenge and Warspite, and on arriving in the Indian Ocean, they rendezvoused with the carriers Indomitable and the small and obsolescent Hermes. By the end of March 1942, the Eastern Fleet had been formed, under the command of Admiral Somerville. Despite the numerical strength of the Eastern Fleet, many of its units, including the four Revenge-class battleships, were no longer front-line warships. Vice Admiral Chūichi Nagumo's powerful Kido Butai, composed of six carriers and four fast battleships, was significantly stronger than Somerville's Eastern Fleet. As a result, only the modernised Warspite could operate with the two fleet carriers; Resolution, her three sisters, and Hermes were kept away from combat to escort convoys in the Indian Ocean.

In late March, the code-breakers at the Far East Combined Bureau, a branch of Bletchley Park, informed Somerville that the Japanese were planning a raid into the Indian Ocean to attack Colombo and Trincomalee and destroy his fleet. He therefore divided his fleet into two groups: Force A, which consisted of the two fleet carriers, Warspite and four cruisers, and Force B, centred on Royal Sovereign and her sisters and the carrier Hermes. He intended to ambush Nagumo's fleet in a night action, the only method by which he thought he could achieve a victory. After three days of searching for the Japanese fleet without success, Somerville returned to Addu Atoll to refuel. While refuelling his ships, Somerville received a report that the Japanese fleet was approaching Colombo, which they attacked the following day, on 5 April, followed by attacks on Trincomalee on 9 April. Following the first raid on 5 April, Somerville withdrew Resolution and her three sisters to Mombasa, where they could secure the shipping routes in the Middle East and the Persian Gulf. The four Revenges departed from Addu Atoll early on the morning on 9 April, bound for Mombasa; they remained based there into 1943. In February 1943, Resolution and Revenge escorted the Operation Pamphlet convoy that carried the 9th Australian Division from Egypt back to Australia.

==== Later career ====
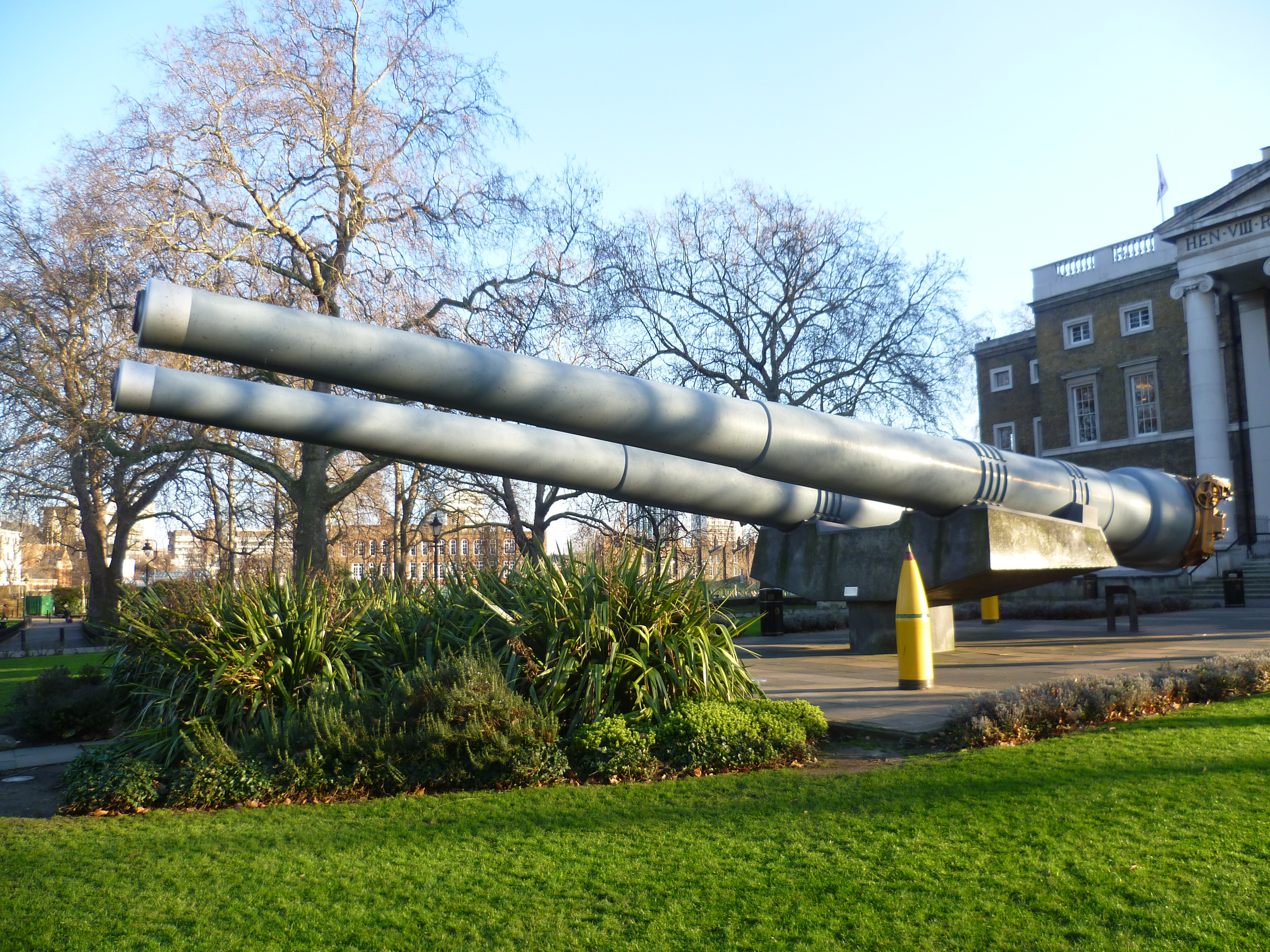
A gun of HMS Resolution on display (the far one)

In September, Resolution returned to Britain, where she underwent a refit. She was reduced to the reserves in October, and in 1944 was assigned to the training establishment HMS Imperieuse. She was disarmed, her main battery guns being used as spares for Warspite and HMS Ramillies, which were being used for coastal bombardment in support of the Normandy landings at the time. Resolution served as a training ship for the next four years before being paid off in February 1948. She was then placed on the disposal list and sold to the British Iron and Steel Co., who sent the vessel to Metal Industries Ltd. in Faslane to be broken up, arriving there on 13 May. One of Resolution's 15-inch guns, which was later fitted to the monitor HMS Roberts, is on display at the Imperial War Museum in London.
