= List of battlecruisers of the Royal Navy =

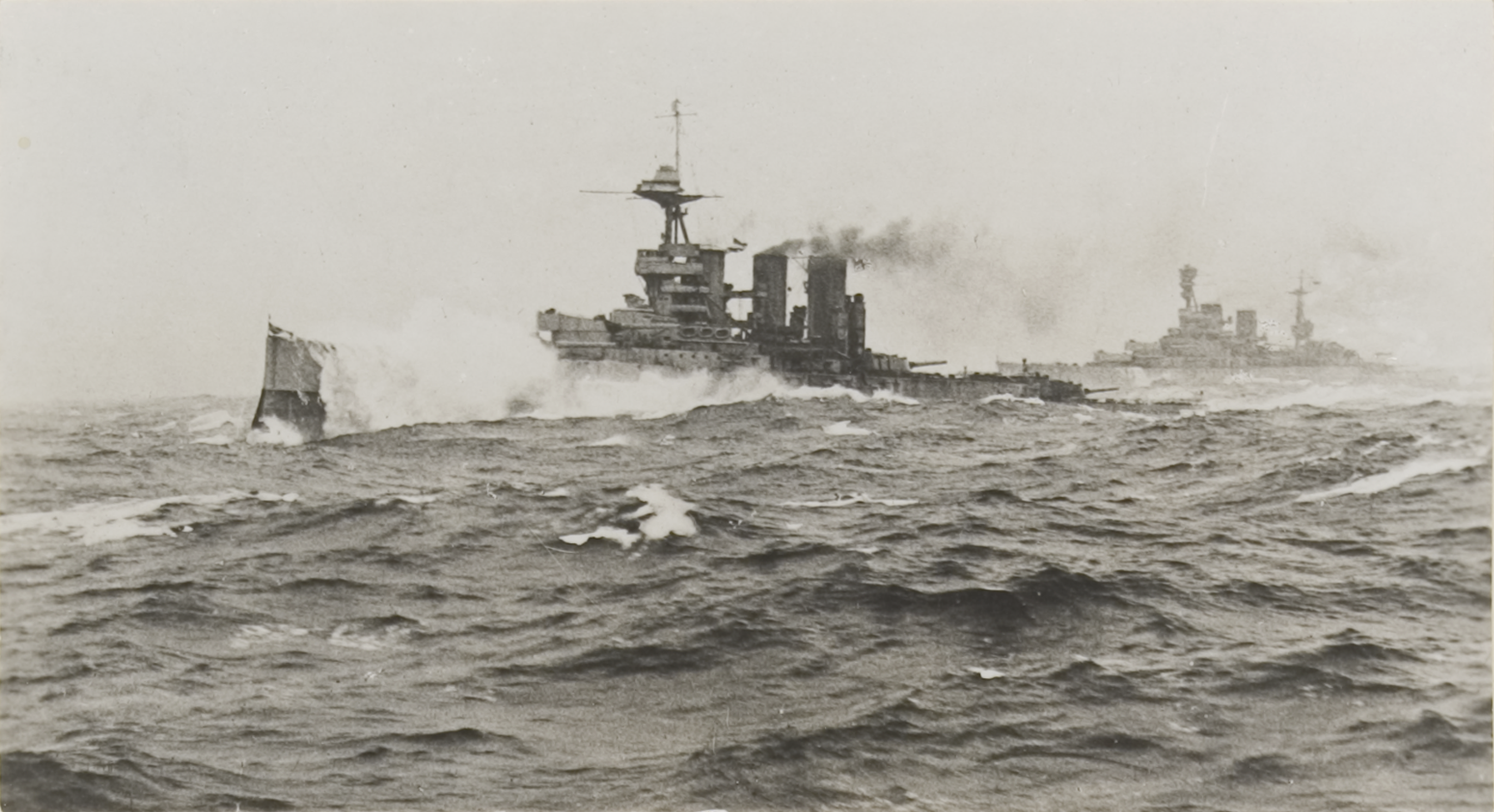
HMS Tiger sailing alongside HMS Renown

The battlecruiser was the brainchild of Admiral Sir John ("Jacky") Fisher, the man who had sponsored the construction of the world's first "all big gun" warship, HMS Dreadnought. He visualised a new breed of warship with the armament of a battleship, but faster, lighter, and less heavily armoured. The first three battlecruisers, the Invincible class, were laid down while Dreadnought was being built in 1906.

This design philosophy was most successful in action when the battlecruisers could use their speed to run down smaller and weaker ships. The best example is the Battle of the Falkland Islands where Invincible and Inflexible sank the German armoured cruisers SMS Scharnhorst and SMS Gneisenau almost without damage to themselves, despite numerous hits by the German ships. They were less successful against heavily armoured ships, as was demonstrated by the loss of Invincible, Indefatigable, and Queen Mary during the Battle of Jutland in 1916. All three ships were destroyed by more heavily armoured German battlecruisers, with the British failure to prevent fires or explosions in the gun turrets from reaching the magazines also playing a role in the losses.

Of the battlecruisers built before the First World War, the Invincible class and Indefatigable class all had 6 inches (152 mm) of armour on their waterline, a top speed of 25 knots (46 km/h; 29 mph), and eight 12-inch (305 mm) guns. The more advanced battlecruisers—the two Lion-class ships, Queen Mary, and HMS Tiger—all had an armour belt of 9 inches (229 mm), speeds over 28 knots (52 km/h; 32 mph), and eight 13.5-inch (343 mm) guns. The Renown and Courageous classes, built during the war, were begun when Admiral Fisher was appointed First Sea Lord for the second time in late 1914. Each of these classes in turn served as the fastest capital ships in the world and were heavily armed with four or six 15-inch (381 mm) guns, but they paid for their speed and armament by having less armour than battleships. HMS Hood was laid down during the war, but was extensively reworked with more armour based on the experience gained at the Battle of Jutland, and was not completed until after the war.

Following the war, the British planned to build the G3 class, which had the same armament and armour as battleships of the time and were rated as battlecruisers only by comparison to the more heavily armoured and slower battleships also planned. They were cancelled as they exceeded the tonnage limits of the Washington Naval Treaty. Of the first nine battlecruisers, only HMS Tiger survived the Washington Treaty and into the 1930s. The three Courageous-class ships were converted to aircraft carriers during the 1920s and only Repulse, Renown and Hood served in the Second World War as battlecruisers. All three went through substantial refits between the wars. Hood was lost in the battle of the Denmark Strait, Repulse was sunk by Japanese aircraft at the start of the war in the Pacific, and Renown survived the war to be scrapped in 1948.

== Key ==
| Main guns | The number and type of the main battery guns |
| Armour | Waterline belt thickness |
| Displacement | Ship displacement at deep load |
| Propulsion | Number of shafts, type of propulsion system, and top speed in knots |
| Service | The dates work began and finished on the ship and its ultimate fate |
| Laid down | The date the keel began to be assembled |
| Commissioned | The date the ship was commissioned |

== Invincible class ==
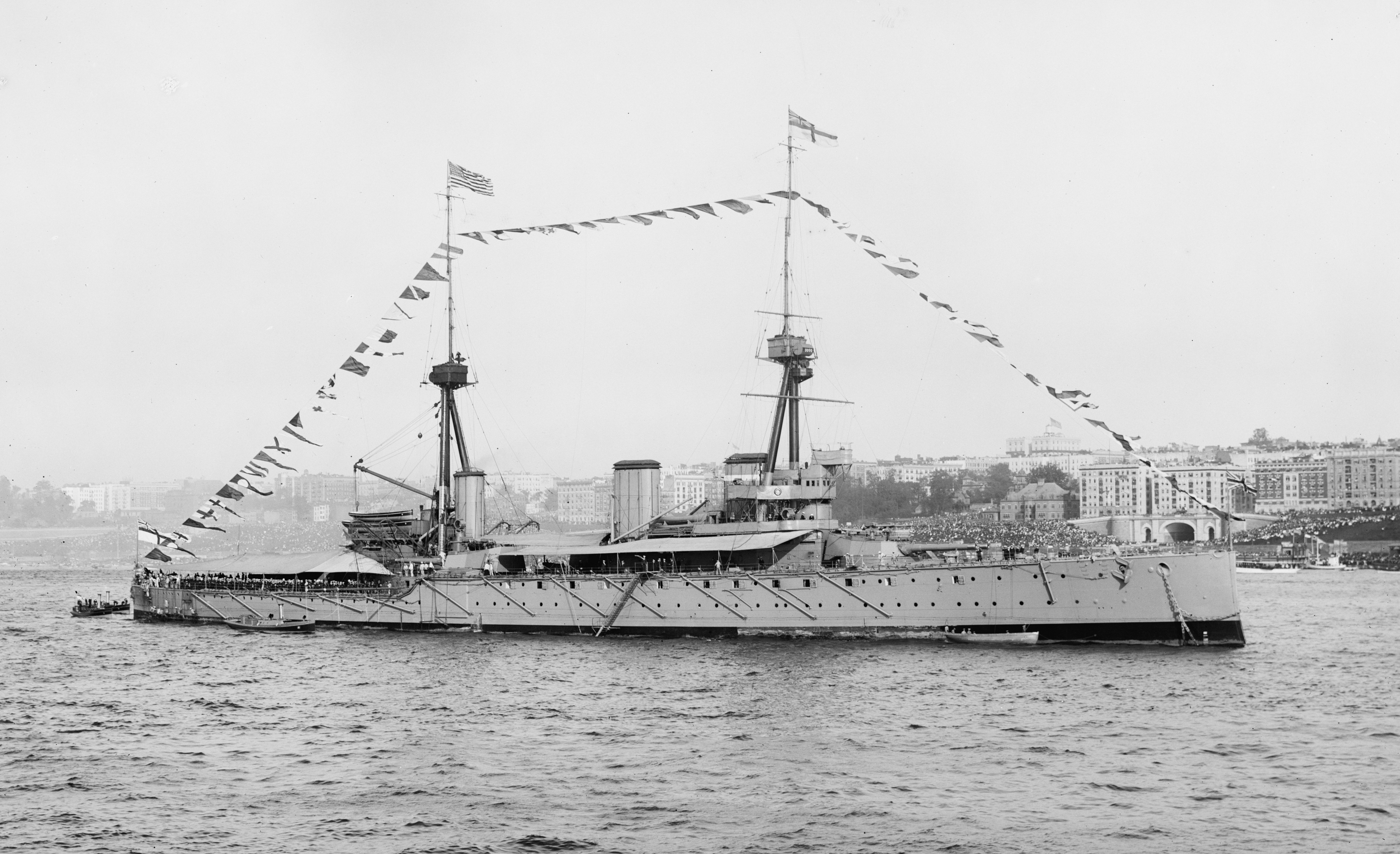
HMS Inflexible about 1909

The Invincible-class ships were the first battlecruisers (Note: These ships were formally known as armoured cruisers until 1911, when they were re-designated as battlecruisers by an Admiralty order of 24 November 1911. Unofficially a number of designations were used until then, including cruiser-battleship, dreadnought cruiser, and battle-cruiser. See Roberts, pp. 24–25.) in the world. The design resembled that of HMS Dreadnought, but sacrificed armour protection and one gun turret from the main battery for a 4-knot (7.4 km/h; 4.6 mph) speed advantage. During the First World War Inflexible and Indomitable participated in the unsuccessful pursuit of the German ships Goeben and Breslau in the Mediterranean. Inflexible was recalled home shortly afterwards, but Indomitable remained off the Dardanelles to bottle up the German ships for the rest of 1914 before returning to the UK. Invincible and Inflexible were sent to the South Atlantic in late 1914 to hunt down the German East Asia Squadron and destroyed it at the Battle of the Falkland Islands. Indomitable participated in the Battle of Dogger Bank in the North Sea in early 1915 while Inflexible was badly damaged during the opening stages of the Dardanelles Campaign. The ships formed the 3rd Battlecruiser Squadron at Jutland where Invincible was destroyed by the explosion of an artillery magazine. The two surviving ships spent the rest of the war conducting patrols of the North Sea, as the High Seas Fleet was forbidden by the Kaiser to risk any more losses. They were put into reserve in early 1919 and sold for scrap on 1 December 1921.

| Ship | Main guns | Armour | Displacement | Propulsion | Service | | |
| Ship | Main guns | Armour | Displacement | Propulsion | Laid down | Commissioned | Fate |
|---|---|---|---|---|---|---|---|
| HMS Invincible | 8 × 12-inch (305 mm) | 6 inches (152 mm) | 20,420 long tons (20,748 t) | 4 screws, steam turbines, 25 kn (46 km/h; 29 mph) | 2 April 1906 | 20 March 1909 | Exploded at the Battle of Jutland, 1916 |
| HMS Inflexible | 8 × 12-inch (305 mm) | 6 inches (152 mm) | 20,420 long tons (20,748 t) | 4 screws, steam turbines, 25 kn (46 km/h; 29 mph) | 5 February 1906 | 20 October 1908 | Sold for scrap, 1 December 1921 |
| HMS Indomitable | 8 × 12-inch (305 mm) | 6 inches (152 mm) | 20,420 long tons (20,748 t) | 4 screws, steam turbines, 25 kn (46 km/h; 29 mph) | 1 March 1906 | 20 June 1908 | Sold for scrap, 1 December 1921 |

== Indefatigable class ==
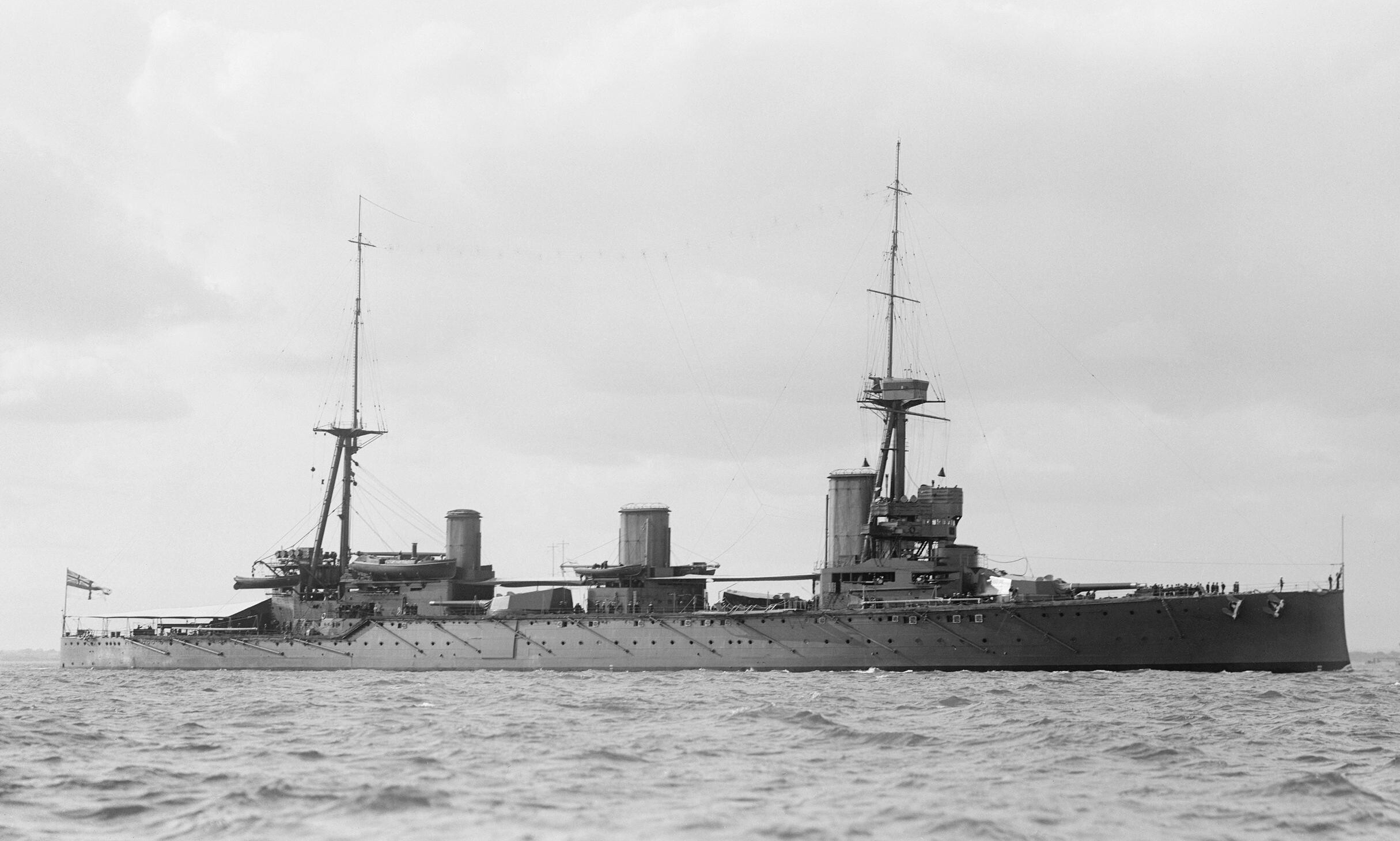
HMS New Zealand

The design of the Indefatigable class represented a modest reworking of the preceding Invincible-class battlecruisers, featuring increased endurance and an improved cross-deck arc of fire for their midships wing turrets achieved by lengthening the hull. Like its predecessor, the design resembled the contemporary dreadnought, but sacrificed armour protection and one turret from the main battery for a 4-knot speed advantage. Originally Indefatigable was the only ship of the class, but HMAS Australia and HMS New Zealand were later built as part of a scheme to improve the defense of the Dominions by having each Dominion purchase a "fleet unit" of one battlecruiser, three light cruisers, and six destroyers. New Zealand agreed to fund one battlecruiser and chose a modified Indefatigable design rather than the Lion-class battlecruiser then being built for the Royal Navy.

They spent most of the war patrolling the North Sea and participated in most of the battles there. Of the two, only New Zealand was in the United Kingdom when the war began. Indefatigable was in the Mediterranean, where she unsuccessfully pursued the German warships Goeben and Breslau as they sailed towards Turkey. New Zealand participated in some of the early actions in the North Sea, including the Battle of Heligoland Bight and the inconclusive Scarborough Raid. Indefatigable and New Zealand participated in the Battle of Jutland, where the former was destroyed by a magazine explosion after numerous hits from the battlecruiser SMS Von der Tann. New Zealand patrolled uneventfully after Jutland, watching for the next appearance of the High Seas Fleet. She conducted Admiral Jellicoe on his tour of India and the Dominions after the war. New Zealand was sold for scrap in 1922 to comply with the Washington Naval Treaty.

| Ship | Main guns | Armour | Displacement | Propulsion | Service | | |
| Ship | Main guns | Armour | Displacement | Propulsion | Laid down | Commissioned | Fate |
|---|---|---|---|---|---|---|---|
| HMS Indefatigable | 8 × 12-inch | 6 inches | 22,430 long tons (22,790 t) | 4 screws, steam turbines, 25 kn (46 km/h; 29 mph) | 23 February 1909 | 24 February 1911 | Exploded at the Battle of Jutland, 1916 |
| HMS New Zealand | 8 × 12-inch | 6 inches | 22,430 long tons (22,790 t) | 4 screws, steam turbines, 25 kn (46 km/h; 29 mph) | 20 June 1910 | 19 November 1912 | Sold for scrap, 19 December 1922 |

== Lion class ==
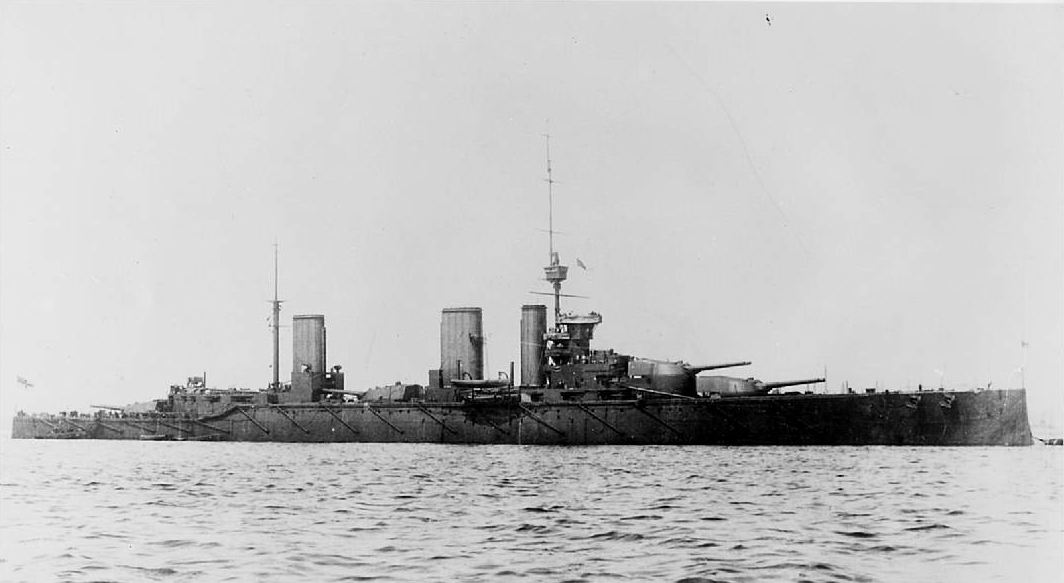
HMS Lion in 1915

The Lion class, nicknamed the "Splendid Cats", were a significant improvement over their predecessors of the Indefatigable class in speed, armament, and armour. The Lion-class ships were 2 knots (3.7 km/h; 2.3 mph) faster, exchanged the 12-inch (305 mm) guns of the older ships for 13.5-inch (343 mm) guns, and had a waterline belt 9 inches (229 mm) thick versus the 6 inches (152 mm) of the Indefatigables. These improvements were in response to the German Moltke class, Germany's second class of battlecruisers, which were larger and more powerful than the first British battlecruisers of the Invincible class.

HMS Lion served as the flagship of the Grand Fleet's battlecruisers throughout the First World War, except when she was being refitted or under repair. She sank the German light cruiser Cöln during the Battle of Heligoland Bight and served as Vice Admiral Beatty's flagship at the battles of Dogger Bank and Jutland. She was so badly damaged at the first of these battles that she had to be towed back to port by HMS Indomitable and was under repair for more than two months. During the Battle of Jutland she suffered a serious propellant fire that destroyed one gun turret, which had to be removed and rebuilt while the ship was under repair for several months.

Princess Royal served in the Battle of Heligoland Bight a month after the war began and then was sent to the Caribbean to prevent the East Asia Squadron from using the Panama Canal. After the East Asia Squadron was sunk at the Battle of the Falkland Islands by the two Invincible-class battlecruisers, Princess Royal rejoined the 1st Battlecruiser Squadron. During the Battle of Dogger Bank she scored only a few hits, although one directly crippled the German armoured cruiser Blücher, which allowed the enemy vessel to be caught and sunk by the concentrated fire of the British battlecruisers. Shortly afterwards Princess Royal became the flagship of the 1st Battlecruiser Squadron, under the command of Rear Admiral Osmond Brock. She was moderately damaged during the Battle of Jutland and required a month and a half of repairs. Both ships spent the rest of the war on uneventful patrols in the North Sea, although they did provide distant cover during the Second Battle of Heligoland Bight in 1917. In 1920 they were both put into reserve and were sold for scrap a few years later under the terms of the Washington Naval Treaty.

| Ship | Main guns | Armour | Displacement | Propulsion | Service | | |
| Ship | Main guns | Armour | Displacement | Propulsion | Laid down | Commissioned | Fate |
|---|---|---|---|---|---|---|---|
| HMS Lion | 8 × 13.5-inch (343 mm) | 9 inches (229 mm) | 30,820 long tons (31,315 t) | 4 screws, steam turbines, 28 kn (52 km/h; 32 mph) | 29 November 1909 | 4 June 1912 | Sold for scrap, 31 January 1924 |
| HMS Princess Royal | 8 × 13.5-inch (343 mm) | 9 inches (229 mm) | 30,820 long tons (31,315 t) | 4 screws, steam turbines, 28 kn (52 km/h; 32 mph) | 2 May 1910 | 14 November 1912 | Scrapped beginning 13 August 1923 |

== HMS Queen Mary ==
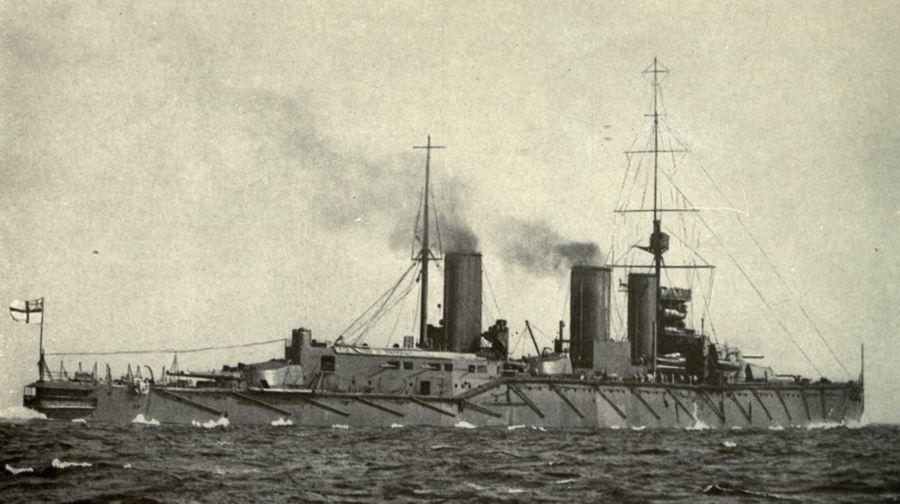
HMS Queen Mary underway

HMS Queen Mary was similar to the Lion-class battlecruisers, though she was slightly larger and given more powerful engines to achieve the same speed as the earlier ships. Her secondary guns were better protected and some of her belt armour was redistributed. She was the last battlecruiser completed before the beginning of the war, and she participated in the Battle of Heligoland Bight shortly after the war began. As part of the 1st Battlecruiser Squadron, she unsuccessfully attempted to intercept a German force that bombarded the North Sea coast of England in December 1914. She was refitting during the Battle of Dogger Bank in early 1915, but participated in the next major fleet action of the war, the Battle of Jutland in mid-1916. Queen Mary hit the German battlecruiser SMS Seydlitz early in the battle and burnt out one of that ship's rear turrets. Seydlitz later knocked out one of Queen Mary's main guns. The German battlecruiser SMS Derfflinger, in the meantime, had lost sight of her previous target in the haze and switched to Queen Mary. Within 10 minutes, Queen Mary was hit twice, exploding shortly afterwards.

| Ship | Main guns | Armour | Displacement | Propulsion | Service | | |
| Ship | Main guns | Armour | Displacement | Propulsion | Laid down | Commissioned | Fate |
|---|---|---|---|---|---|---|---|
| HMS Queen Mary | 8 × 13.5-inch | 9 inches | 31,844 long tons (32,355 t) | 4 screws, steam turbines, 28 kn (52 km/h; 32 mph) | 6 March 1911 | 4 September 1913 | Exploded at the Battle of Jutland, 1916 |

== HMS Tiger ==
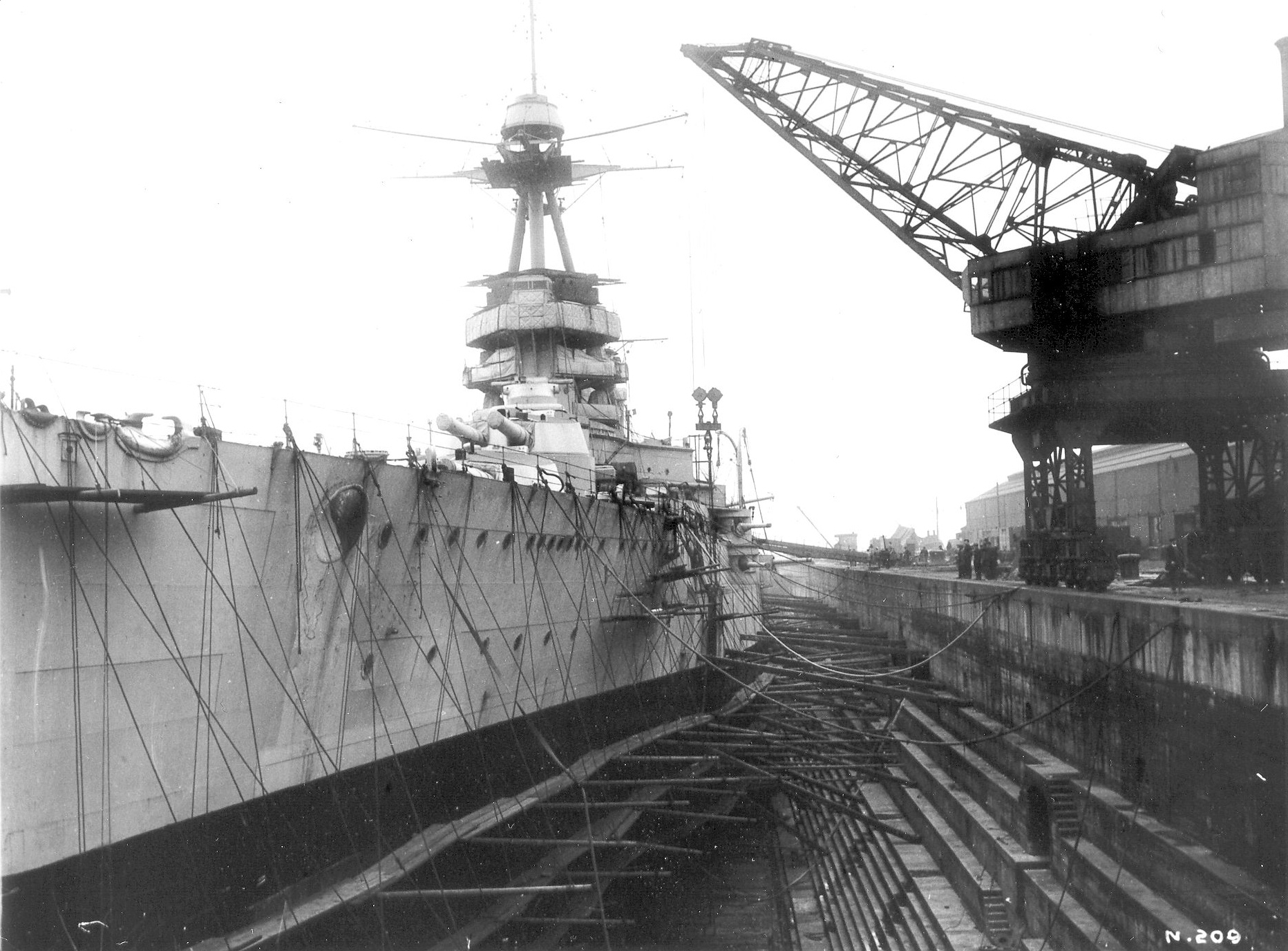
HMS Tiger in drydock about 1916–17

HMS Tiger was the most heavily armoured battlecruiser of the Royal Navy at the start of the First World War, although she was still being finished when the war began. The ship was assigned to the 1st Battlecruiser Squadron for the duration of the war and participated in the Battle of Dogger Bank in early 1915 even though she was still shaking down and did not perform well. She next participated in the Battle of Jutland in 1916 where she was one of the British battlecruisers most often hit by German shells; she was only lightly damaged. She spent the rest of the war on uneventful patrols in the North Sea, although she did provide distant cover during the Second Battle of Heligoland Bight.

Tiger was the oldest battlecruiser retained by the Royal Navy after the tonnage limits of the Washington Naval Treaty came into effect in 1922. She became a gunnery training ship in 1924 and joined the Battlecruiser Squadron in 1929 while its flagship, HMS Hood, underwent a lengthy refit. Upon Hood's return to service in 1931, Tiger was decommissioned and sold for scrap in 1932 in accordance with the terms of the London Naval Treaty of 1930.

| Ship | Main guns | Armour | Displacement | Propulsion | Service | | |
| Ship | Main guns | Armour | Displacement | Propulsion | Laid down | Commissioned | Fate |
|---|---|---|---|---|---|---|---|
| HMS Tiger | 8 × 13.5-inch | 9 inches | 33,260 long tons (33,794 t) | 4 screws, steam turbines, 28 kn (52 km/h; 32 mph) | 6 June 1912 | 3 October 1914 | Sold for scrap, February 1932 |

== Renown class ==
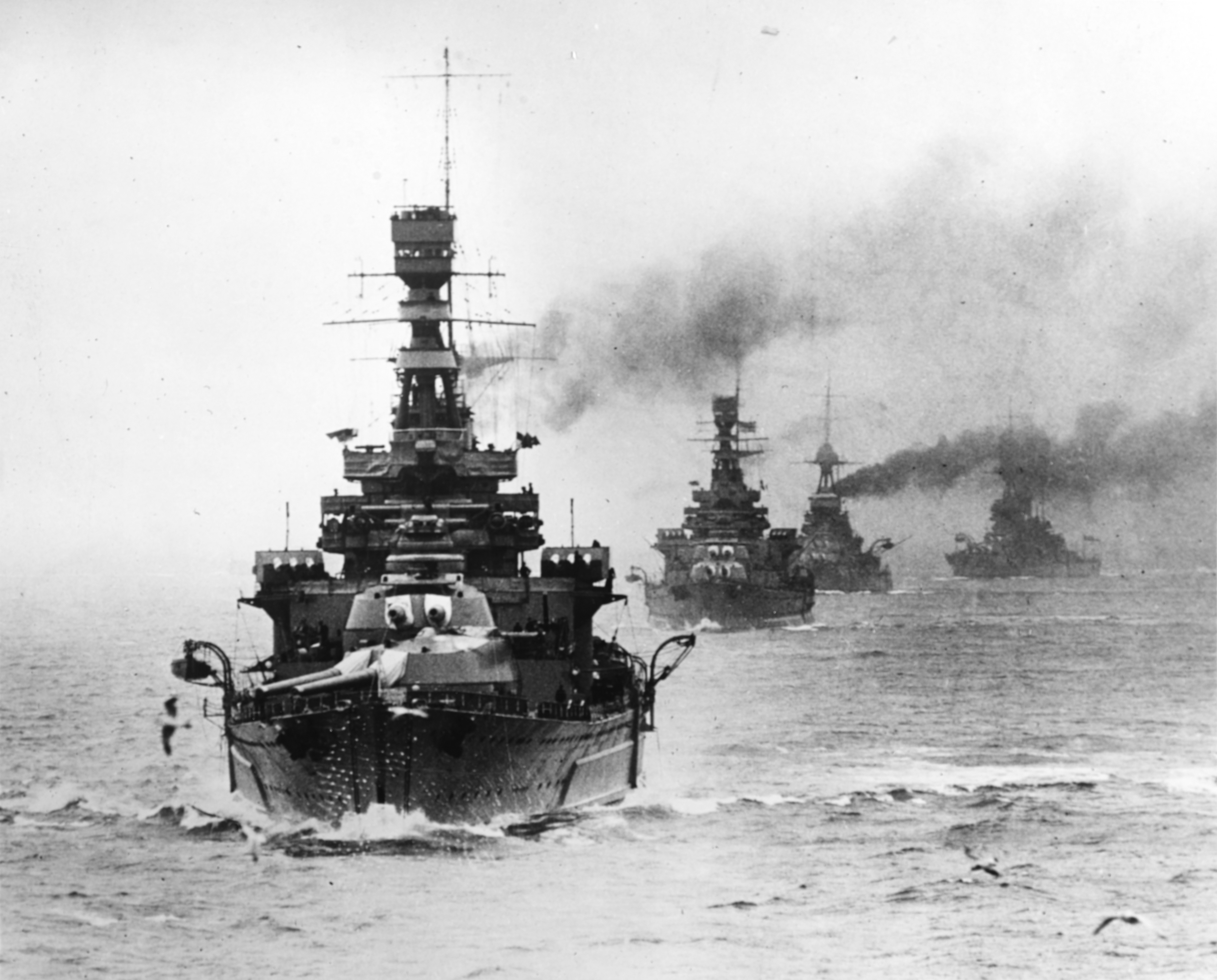
Repulse leading Renown and other capital ships during the late 1920s

The Renown-class ships were originally laid down as improved versions of the Revenge-class battleships. Construction was suspended at the outbreak of the war on the grounds they would not be ready in time. Admiral Lord Fisher, upon becoming First Sea Lord, gained approval to restart their construction as battlecruisers that could be built and enter service quickly. The Director of Naval Construction (DNC), Eustace Tennyson-d'Eyncourt, quickly produced an entirely new design to meet Admiral Lord Fisher's requirements and the builders agreed to deliver the ships in 15 months. They did not quite meet that ambitious goal, but they were delivered a few months after the Battle of Jutland in 1916. They were the world's fastest capital ships upon completion.

HMS Repulse was the only ship of the class to see combat in the First World War when she participated in the Second Battle of Heligoland Bight in 1917. Both ships were reconstructed twice between the wars; their armour protection was increased along with other lesser improvements in the 1920s, while a much more thorough reconstruction was done in the 1930s, especially for HMS Renown. Both ships served during the Second World War; they searched for the German cruiser Admiral Graf Spee in 1939, participated in the Norwegian Campaign of April–June 1940, and searched for the German battleship Bismarck in 1941. Repulse was sunk on 10 December 1941 in the South China Sea off Kuantan, Pahang, by Japanese aircraft.

Renown spent much of 1940 and 1941 assigned to Force H at Gibraltar escorting convoys, and she fought in the inconclusive Battle of Cape Spartivento. She was briefly assigned to the Home Fleet and provided cover to several Arctic convoys in early 1942. The ship was transferred back to Force H for Operation Torch and spent much of 1943 refitting and transporting Winston Churchill and his staff to and from various conferences with Allied leaders. In early 1944 Renown was transferred to the Eastern Fleet in the Indian Ocean, where she supported numerous attacks on Japanese-occupied facilities in Indonesia and various island groups in the Indian Ocean. The ship returned to the Home Fleet in early 1945 and was placed in reserve after the end of the war. Renown was sold for scrap in 1948.

| Ship | Main guns | Armour | Displacement | Propulsion | Service | | |
| Ship | Main guns | Armour | Displacement | Propulsion | Laid down | Completed | Fate |
|---|---|---|---|---|---|---|---|
| HMS Renown | 6 × 15-inch (381 mm) | 6 inches | 32,220 long tons (32,737 t) | 4 screws, steam turbines, 31.5 kn (58.3 km/h; 36.2 mph) | 25 January 1915 | 20 September 1916 | Sold for scrap, August 1948 |
| HMS Repulse | 6 × 15-inch (381 mm) | 6 inches | 32,220 long tons (32,737 t) | 4 screws, steam turbines, 31.5 kn (58.3 km/h; 36.2 mph) | 25 January 1915 | 14 November 1916 | Sunk by Japanese air attack 10 December 1941 |

== Courageous class ==
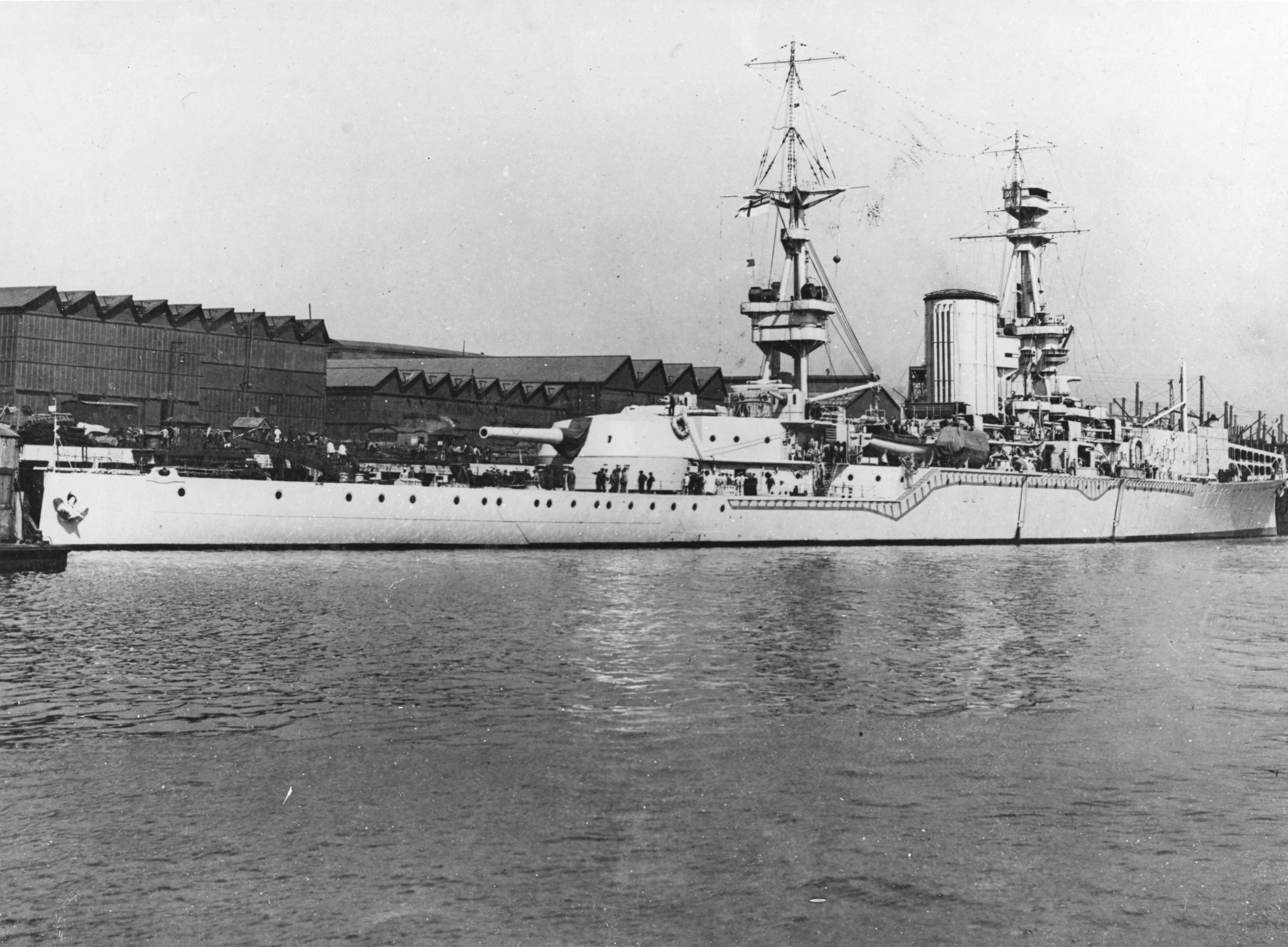
HMS Furious as first completed in 1917 with a flying-off deck forward and a single 18-inch turret aft

The Courageous class comprised three battlecruisers, known as "large light cruisers", that were nominally designed to support Admiral of the Fleet Lord John Fisher's Baltic Project, which was intended to land troops on the German Baltic Coast. The ships of this class were fast but very lightly armoured with only a few heavy guns. They were given a shallow draught, in part to allow them to operate in the shallow waters of the Baltic but also reflecting experience gained earlier in the war. To maximize their speed, the Courageous class were the first capital ships of the Royal Navy to use geared steam turbines and small-tube boilers. This made them the fastest capital ships in existence, slightly faster than even the Renown-class ships.

The first two ships, HMS Courageous and HMS Glorious, were commissioned in 1917 and spent the war patrolling the North Sea. They participated in the Second Battle of Heligoland Bight and were present when the High Seas Fleet surrendered a year later. Their half-sister HMS Furious was designed with a pair of 18-inch (457 mm) guns, the largest guns ever fitted on a ship of the Royal Navy, but was modified during construction to take a flying-off deck and hangar in lieu of her forward turret and barbette. After some patrols in the North Sea her rear turret was removed and another flight deck added. Her aircraft attacked the Zeppelin sheds during the Tondern raid in July 1918. All three ships were laid up after the end of the war, but were rebuilt as aircraft carriers during the 1920s. Glorious and Courageous were sunk early in the Second World War and Furious was sold for scrap in 1948.

| Ship | Main guns | Armour | Displacement | Propulsion | Service | | |
| Ship | Main guns | Armour | Displacement | Propulsion | Laid down | Completed | Fate |
|---|---|---|---|---|---|---|---|
| HMS Courageous | 4 × 15-inch | 2 inches (51 mm) | 22,560 long tons (22,922 t) | 4 screws, steam turbines, 32 kn (59 km/h; 37 mph) | 28 March 1915 | 28 October 1916 | Sunk by U-29, 17 September 1939 |
| HMS Glorious | 4 × 15-inch | 2 inches (51 mm) | 22,560 long tons (22,922 t) | 4 screws, steam turbines, 32 kn (59 km/h; 37 mph) | 1 May 1915 | 14 October 1916 | Sunk by the German battleships Scharnhorst and Gneisenau 8 June 1940 |
| HMS Furious | 2 × 18-inch (457 mm) | 2 inches (51 mm) | 22,890 long tons (23,257 t) | 4 screws, steam turbines, 32 kn (59 km/h; 37 mph) | 8 June 1915 | 26 June 1917 | Sold for scrap, 15 March 1948 |

== Admiral class ==
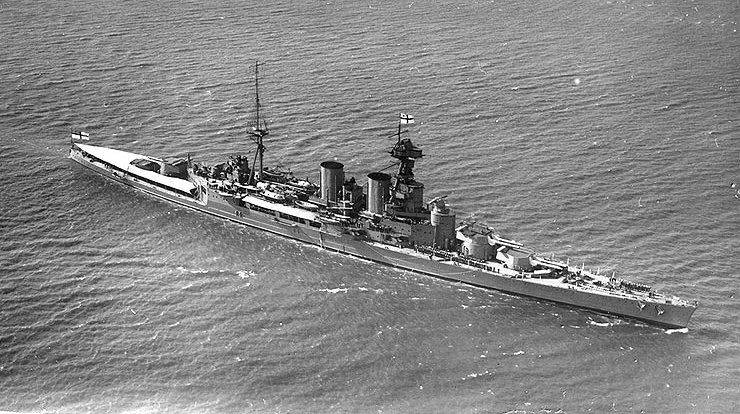
HMS Hood in 1924

The Admiral-class battlecruisers were intended as improved versions of the Queen Elizabeth-class battleships, but were recast as battlecruisers after Admiral John Jellicoe, commander of the Grand Fleet, saw no real need for more battleships. A number of German battlecruisers had been laid down that were superior to the bulk of the Grand Fleet's battlecruisers so the design was revised to counter these. The class was going to consist of Hood, Anson, Howe, and Rodney—all names of famous Admirals—but the latter three ships were suspended as the material and labour required to complete them was needed for higher-priority merchantmen and escort vessels. Their designs were updated to incorporate the lessons from the Battle of Jutland, but the Admiralty eventually decided that it was better to begin again with a clean-slate design so they were cancelled in 1919.

Hood, however, was sufficiently advanced in construction that she was completed in 1920 and immediately became flagship of the Battlecruiser Squadron of the Atlantic Fleet. In 1923–24 Hood, accompanied by Repulse and a number of Danae-class cruisers, sailed around the world from west to east via the Panama Canal. On 23 April 1937, after the beginning of the Spanish Civil War, she escorted three British merchantmen into Bilbao harbour despite the presence of the Nationalist cruiser Almirante Cervera that attempted to blockade the port. Hood spent most of the early part of the Second World War patrolling against German commerce raiders and escorting convoys. As flagship of Force H based at Gibraltar, she bombarded French ships during the attack on Mers-el-Kébir. In May 1941 Hood and the battleship Prince of Wales were ordered to intercept the German battleship Bismarck and the heavy cruiser Prinz Eugen as they attempted to break out into the North Atlantic. In the subsequent Battle of the Denmark Strait Hood's aft magazines exploded, sinking her within five minutes of the start of the battle.

| Ship | Main guns | Armour | Displacement | Propulsion | Service | | |
| Ship | Main guns | Armour | Displacement | Propulsion | Laid down | Completed | Fate |
|---|---|---|---|---|---|---|---|
| HMS Hood | 8 × 15-inch (381 mm) | 12 inches | 46,680 long tons (47,429 t) | 4 screws, steam turbines, 32 kn (59 km/h; 37 mph) | 1 September 1916 | 15 May 1920 | Sunk 24 May 1941 by the German battleship Bismarck |
| HMS Anson | 8 × 15-inch (381 mm) | 12 inches | 46,680 long tons (47,429 t) | 4 screws, steam turbines, 32 kn (59 km/h; 37 mph) | 9 November 1916 | Suspended March 1917 | Cancelled 27 February 1919 |
| HMS Howe | 8 × 15-inch (381 mm) | 12 inches | 46,680 long tons (47,429 t) | 4 screws, steam turbines, 32 kn (59 km/h; 37 mph) | 16 October 1916 | Suspended March 1917 | Cancelled 27 February 1919 |
| HMS Rodney | 8 × 15-inch (381 mm) | 12 inches | 46,680 long tons (47,429 t) | 4 screws, steam turbines, 32 kn (59 km/h; 37 mph) | 9 October 1916 | Suspended March 1917 | Cancelled 27 February 1919 |

== G3 battlecruiser ==
The G3 battlecruisers were planned as a response to naval expansion programmes by the United States and Japan. The four ships of this class would have been larger, faster, and more heavily armed than any existing battleship (although several projected foreign ships would be larger). The "battlecruiser" designation came from their higher speed and lesser firepower and armour relative to the planned N3-class battleship design. The G3s would have carried nine 16-inch (406 mm) guns and were expected to achieve 32 knots (59 km/h; 37 mph), while the N3s would carry nine 18-inch (457 mm) guns on the same displacement at the expense of a slower speed. While officially referred to as "battlecruisers", the G3s have also been considered "fast battleships".

The G3 design was approved by the Board of Admiralty on 12 August 1921. Orders were placed in October and November, but were suspended later in November with the beginning of the Washington Naval Conference, which limited battleship numbers. The orders were cancelled in February 1922 with the ratification of the Washington Naval Treaty, which limited construction to ships of no more than 35,000-long-ton (36,000 t) displacement.

| Ship | Main guns | Armour | Displacement | Propulsion | Service | |
| Ship | Main guns | Armour | Displacement | Propulsion | Laid down | Fate |
|---|---|---|---|---|---|---|
| G3 battlecruiser | 9 × 16-inch (406 mm) | 14 inches (356 mm) | 53,909 long tons (54,774 t) | 4 screws, steam turbines, 31 kn (57 km/h; 36 mph) | Ordered 26 October 1921 | Cancelled February 1922 |
