= Launch and recovery cycle =

Air operation

Aircraft carrier air operations include a launch and recovery cycle of embarked aircraft. Launch and recovery cycles are scheduled to support efficient use of naval aircraft for searching, defensive patrols, and offensive airstrikes. The relative importance of these three missions varies with time and location. Through the first quarter-century of aircraft carrier operations, launch and recovery cycles attempted to optimize mission performance for ships with a straight flight deck above an aircraft storage hangar deck. Carrier air operations evolved rapidly from experimental ships of the early 1920s through the combat experience of World War II.

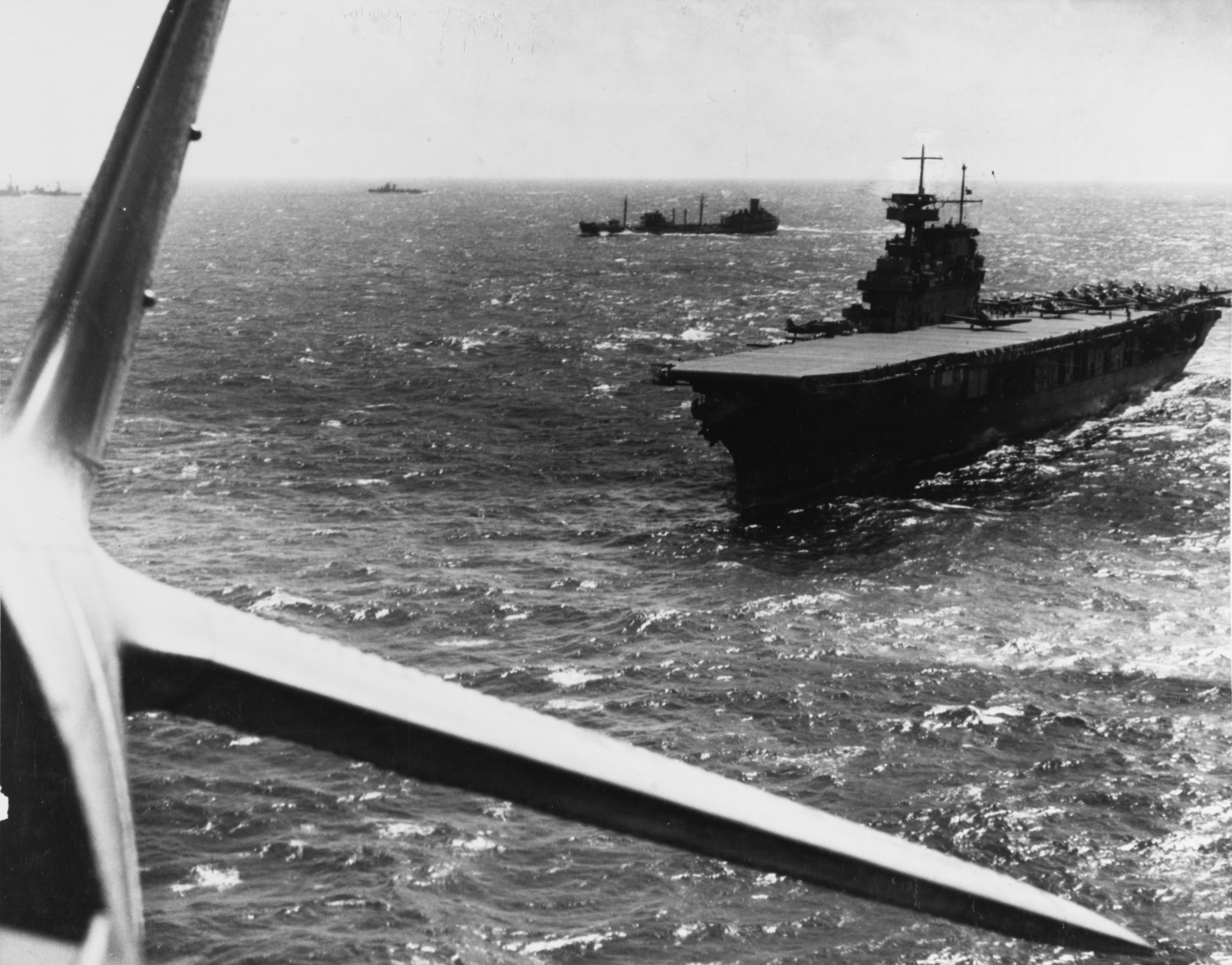
USS Yorktown launching aircraft positioned on the aft portion of the flight deck.

== Background ==
World War I naval engagements demonstrated the increased range of dreadnought battleship guns and the inability of scout cruisers to fulfill their traditional role of finding the enemy fleet and informing friendly forces of advantageous maneuvers before they came within gun range. Aircraft carriers were initially perceived as a means for a fleet of battleships to bring along aircraft to find the enemy fleet and spot the fall of shot beyond visibility range of the firing ships.

== Early experiments ==
As the first aircraft carriers became operational in the early 1920s, they learned the necessary techniques for storing, launching, recovering, and servicing aircraft at sea. Early fleet exercises demonstrated the ability of aircraft to extend effective gunnery range from 20,000 yards (18 km) to 24,000 yards (22 km). Theorists suggested the possibility of denying that advantage to the enemy by using fighters to shoot down enemy aircraft, and predicted tactical advantages for the fleet able to launch the larger number of aircraft. Aircraft carriers embarked as many aircraft as possible to maximize mission effectiveness and sustained mission capability through anticipated operational losses of aircraft.

Multiple planes could be launched from the flight deck in the time it took to move a single plane from the hangar deck to the flight deck. United States Navy doctrine, formulated in the mild climate of the eastern Pacific, considered the hangar deck a maintenance shop, and stored most embarked aircraft on the flight deck to minimize time required to position for launch. Royal Navy doctrine, formulated in the cold and stormy north Atlantic, stored most embarked aircraft on the hangar deck to minimize weather damage and maximize operational readiness when the time came to launch. In either case, when all aircraft were positioned on the aft portion of the flight deck, the aircraft carrier turned into the wind to maximize airspeed over the flight deck and began launching aircraft over the bow.

Range of the aircraft and duration of searching or gunfire spotting was a function of fuel capacity; and, for a group of aircraft operating together for mutual defense, fuel consumption began when the first aircraft was launched. This interdependence encouraged launch of all available aircraft in the shortest possible time so they might form up and proceed toward their target with minimum fuel consumption while waiting for the launch of the last plane. Rapid launch also minimized the time the aircraft carrier had to deviate from its intended course to conform to wind direction.

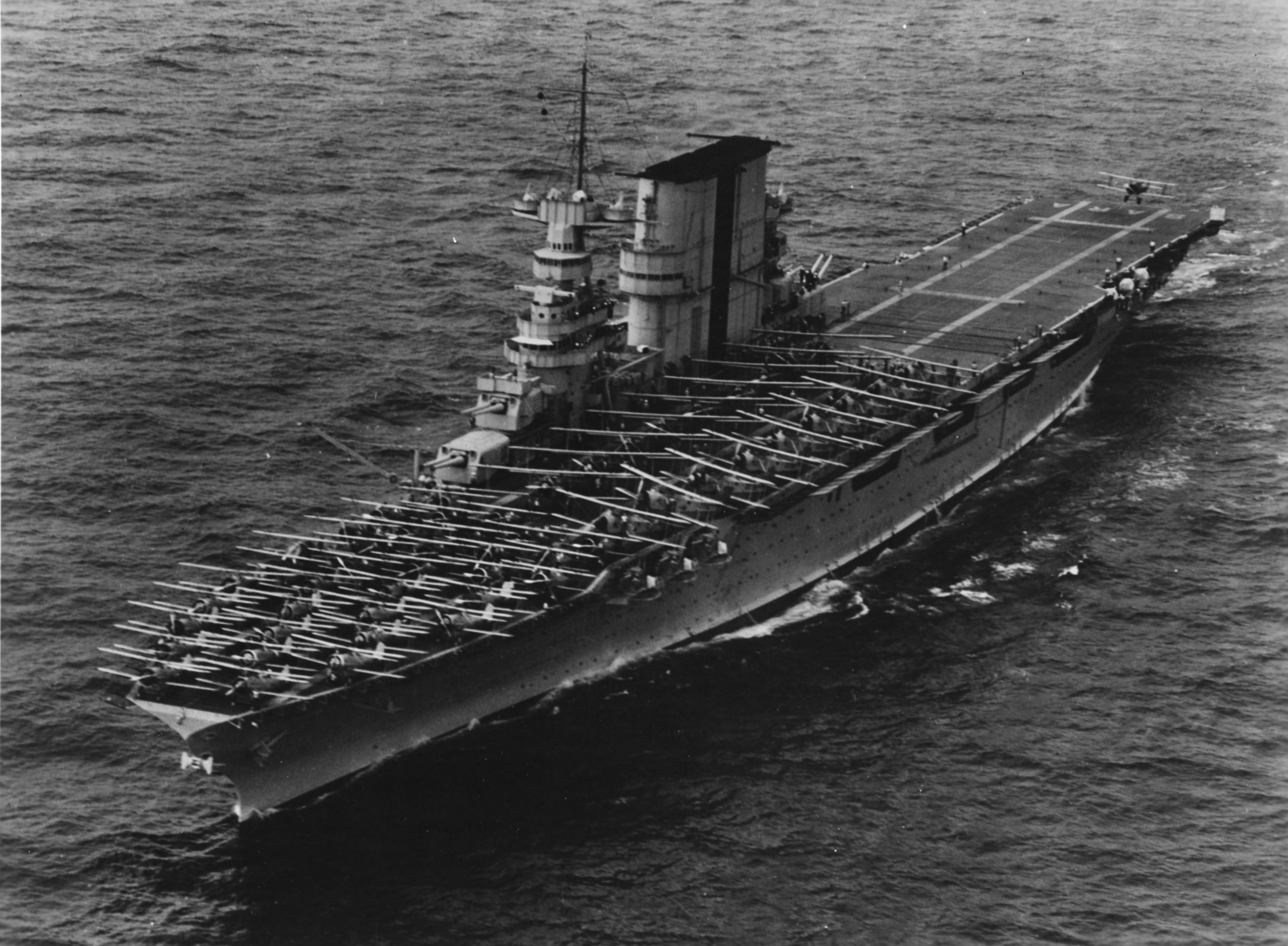
USS Saratoga using flight deck storage while landing aircraft in 1935.

When the planes returned from their mission, the aircraft carrier again turned into the wind and began recovering aircraft over the stern. Planes were initially transferred into the hangar deck by elevators to clear the flight deck for the next plane to land. Completing this process as quickly as possible prevented loss of planes from fuel exhaustion, and again minimized the time the carrier must deviate from its preferred course into the direction of the wind. By the 1930s carriers halved the time required for aircraft recovery by using temporary barricades across the flight deck to allow storage of aircraft on the forward portion of the flight deck while aircraft landed on the aft portion of the flight deck.

A disadvantage of storing aircraft on the flight deck (even temporarily until elevators were ready for a hangar transfer) was the inability to simultaneously launch and recover aircraft. Aircraft had to be stored either on the stern while launching, or on the bow while recovering; and any aircraft remaining on the flight deck when either evolution was completed had to be moved to the opposite end of the ship or to the hangar before beginning the other. Flight operations initially involved a launch and recovery cycle beginning with the launch of aircraft, followed by movement of unlaunched aircraft, and ending with recovery of aircraft. Sustained flight operations also required a period of refueling and repositioning the recovered aircraft for the next launch. Aircraft experiencing unexpected difficulties after launch might be lost if they were unable to stay airborne until the aircraft remaining on the flight deck could be repositioned for recovery.

Several early aircraft carriers included flying-off platforms for launching from the hangar deck while the flight deck was being used for landings, but those platforms proved impractical. Hangar deck catapults were more successful, but six catapults would be required to match the deck roll launch rate from a single flight deck, and no aircraft carrier was willing to sacrifice the aircraft storage capacity and defensive gun positions which would have been lost to install that number of catapults. The few catapults required to launch heavy aircraft were typically installed on the flight deck.

As larger aircraft carriers became available in the late 1920s, tactics evolved to utilize the larger number of available aircraft for offensive strike capabilities. Strafing fighters might be able to damage delicate battleship fire control equipment like optical rangefinders. Planes of the 1930s were considered incapable of carrying weapons to sink a battleship, but they might be able to launch torpedoes to slow enemy battleships so friendly forces could come into gunnery range. Fleet exercises practicing expanded use of aircraft required more complex launch and recovery cycles from dawn to dusk; but night operations were seldom practiced because of visibility limitations.

Search planes might be readied to launch at dawn so they could make a complete search around the fleet for enemy units moving into range during the preceding hours of darkness. The first launch in the morning might also include a combat air patrol (CAP) of fighters to loiter over the fleet ready to destroy any enemy search aircraft, and perhaps a few anti-submarine bombers ready to attack any submarine which might be found in a position to menace the fleet. While the dawn launch was aloft, additional planes might be readied for upcoming missions. Some planes might be readied to continue the search and patrol missions after the aircraft launched at dawn had returned to refuel, and others might be readied for offensive operations in case the enemy fleet was discovered. Some of these aircraft might be positioned on the flight deck in preparation for a speedy launch, and aircraft assigned to continue the search and patrol missions were typically launched to clear the flight deck in preparation for recovery of the aircraft launched at dawn.

After the dawn launch had been recovered, those planes might be refueled in preparation to either repeat the search and patrol mission or augment the offensive force. If no enemy fleet was discovered, this cycle would be repeated through the daylight hours, although there would be no launch prior to recovering the last search and patrol mission of the day during the fading hours of daylight.

== Wartime ==
Loss of HMS Courageous in September 1939 emphasized aircraft carrier vulnerability to submarines; and loss of HMS Glorious in June 1940 illustrated the importance of maintaining a launch and recovery cycle to keep search aircraft aloft despite the decreased speed of advance resulting from periodic course changes to accommodate wind direction. Most aircraft carriers accepted the operational inconvenience of full utilization of both deck and hangar storage for embarked aircraft after Royal Navy losses to air attack during Operation Excess and the Battle of Crete illustrated the importance of maximizing the number of fighters available for CAP.

The attack on Pearl Harbor demonstrated the effectiveness of an offensive strike in two waves. Aircraft stored on the flight deck (less any fighters retained as CAP) formed a first attack wave. Launch of a second wave commenced when all aircraft stored on the hangar deck had been positioned on the flight deck. CAP might be refueled following launch of the second wave. With CAP prepared to intercept any enemy aircraft following the strike back to the carriers, the carriers would typically recover the first wave, move those aircraft into the hangar, and then recover the second wave.

In the carrier battles of 1942, aircraft stored on the hangar deck were positioned to launch as a strike force after aircraft stored on the flight deck had been launched as CAP and to search for the enemy fleet. The strike force sometimes launched before the enemy was found if necessary to clear the flight deck for recovery of the morning search and CAP aircraft. Strike force range was decreased by launching before target location was known; but, as demonstrated at the Battle of Midway, removal of fueled and armed aircraft decreased severity of battle damage to aircraft carriers, and preserved those aircraft from loss aboard a damaged carrier. Attempting to launch during an air attack limited maneuvering ability to evade torpedoes and bombs.

== Post-war changes ==
Carrier operations changed after the second world war to include radar-assisted night operations and accommodate jet aircraft requiring catapults. Helicopters, V/STOL aircraft, and widespread adoption of angled flight decks simplified simultaneous launch and recovery of aircraft. Infrequency of combat between equivalent opposing air forces reduced emphasis on airstrikes using all embarked aircraft. Carrier operations during the Korean War and Vietnam War emphasized deckload strikes of about thirty aircraft with cyclic operations involving smaller numbers of planes for combat air patrol, airborne early warning and control, reconnaissance, or free-lance missions seeking targets of opportunity. The shorter endurance of unrefueled jets caused the normal cycle time to be reduced to about 90 minutes from the four hours which had been typical for the latter part of World War II. Fires aboard USS Forrestal and Enterprise demonstrated that the damage enhancement factor of combat loaded aircraft aboard a carrier persisted through the shift from gasoline to jet fuel.

== Sources ==
- Brown, David (1977). Aircraft Carriers. New York: Arco Publishing Company. ISBN 0-668-04164-1.
- Friedman, Norman (1983). U.S. Aircraft Carriers. Annapolis, Maryland: Naval Institute Press. ISBN 0-87021-739-9.
- MacIntyre, Donald (1971). Aircraft Carrier the majestic weapon. New York: Ballantine Books.
- Ofstie, Ralph A. (1946). The Campaigns of the Pacific War. Washington DC: United States Government Printing Office.
- Pawlowski, Gareth L. (1971). Flat-Tops and Fledglings. New York: Castle Books.
- Potter, E.B.; Chester W. Nimitz (1960). Sea Power. Englewood Cliffs, NJ: Prentice-Hall. ISBN 978-0-13-796870-1.
- Winston, Robert A. (1942). Aircraft Carrier. New York: Harper & Brothers.
- Winton, John (1977). Air Power at Sea 1939-45. New York: Thomas Y. Crowell Company. ISBN 0-690-01222-5.

== See also ==
- Wave off
- Index of aviation articles
