= Courageous-class battlecruiser =

Ship class built for the Royal Navy during the First World War

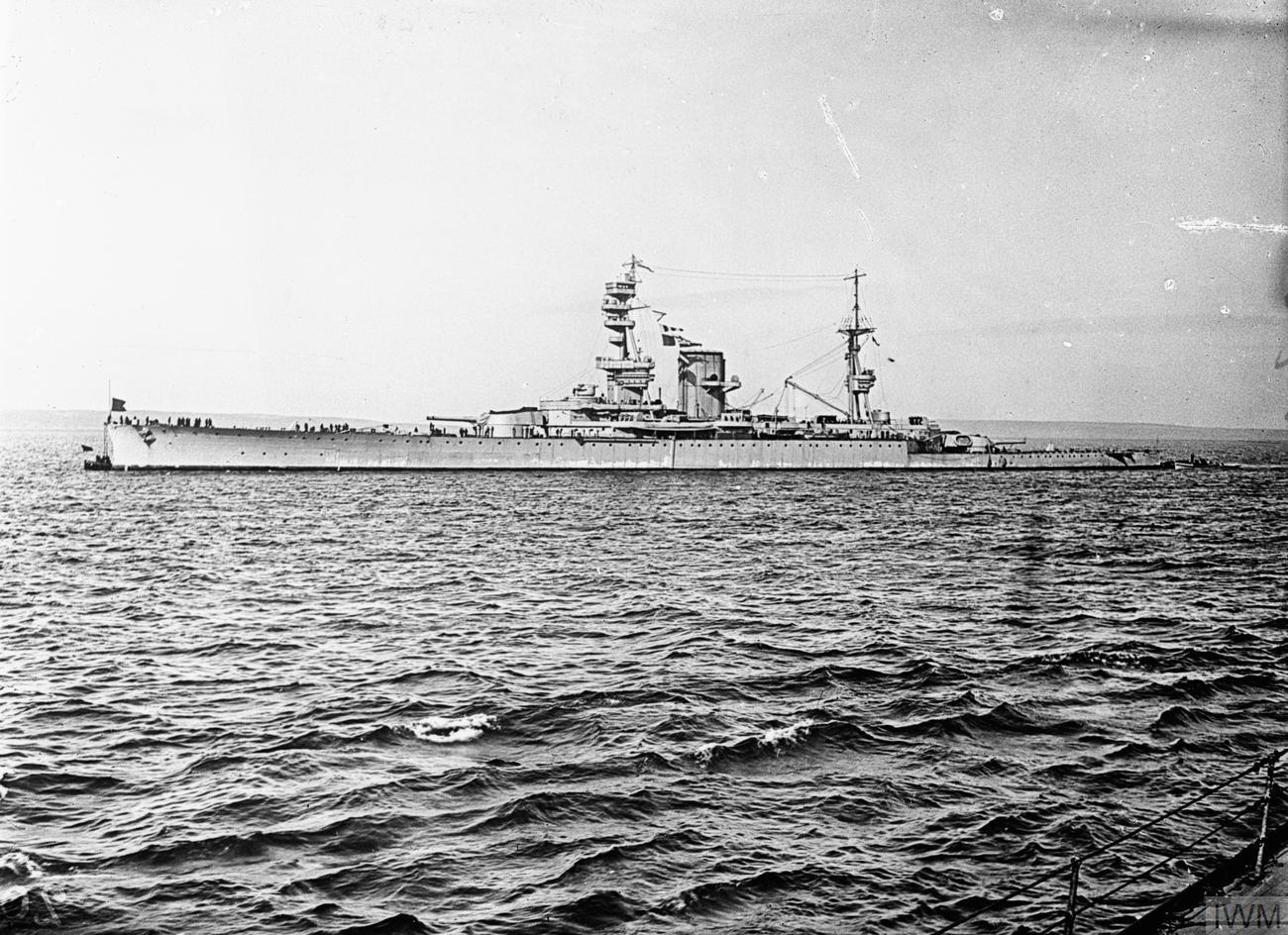
- Courageous as a battlecruiser during the First World War

Class overview
- Name: Courageous class
- Builders: Armstrong Whitworth (2); Harland & Wolff (1)
- Operators: Royal Navy
- Preceded by: Renown class
- Succeeded by: Admiral class
- Subclasses: HMS Furious
- Built: 1915–1917
- In service: 1916–1944
- In commission: 1916–1944
- Planned: 3
- Completed: 3
- Lost: 2
- Scrapped: 1

General characteristics (Courageous)
- Type: Large light cruiser/battlecruiser
- Displacement: 19,180 long tons (19,488 t); 22,560 long tons (22,922 t) (deep load)
- Length: 786 ft 9 in (239.8 m)
- Beam: 81 ft (24.7 m)
- Draught: 25 ft 10 in (7.9 m)
- Installed power: 90,000 shp (67,113 kW); 18 small-tube boilers
- Propulsion: 4 shafts; 4 geared steam turbines
- Speed: 32 knots (59 km/h; 37 mph)
- Complement: 842 officers and men
- Armament: 2 × twin 15-inch (381 mm) guns; 6 × triple 4-inch (102 mm) guns; 2 × single 3-inch (76 mm) anti-aircraft guns; 2 × single 21 in (533 mm) torpedo tubes
- Armour: Belt: 2–3 in (51–76 mm); Decks: .75–3 in (19–76 mm); Barbettes: 3–7 in (76–178 mm); Gun turrets: 7–9 in (178–229 mm); Conning tower: 10 in (254 mm); Torpedo bulkheads: 1–1.5 in (25–38 mm)

The Courageous class consisted of three battlecruisers known as "large light cruisers" built for the Royal Navy during the First World War. The class was nominally designed to support the Baltic Project, a plan by Admiral of the Fleet Lord Fisher that was intended to land troops on the German Baltic Coast. Ships of this class were fast but very lightly armoured, with only a few heavy guns. They were given a shallow draught, in part to allow them to operate in the shallow waters of the Baltic but also reflecting experience gained earlier in the war. To maximize their speed, the Courageous-class battlecruisers were the first capital ships of the Royal Navy to use geared steam turbines and small-tube boilers.

The first two ships, Courageous and Glorious, were commissioned in 1917 and spent the war patrolling the North Sea. They participated in the Second Battle of Heligoland Bight in November 1917 and were present when the High Seas Fleet surrendered a year later. Their half-sister Furious was designed with a pair of 18-inch (457 mm) guns, the largest guns ever fitted on a ship of the Royal Navy, but was modified during construction to take a flying-off deck and hangar in lieu of her forward turret and barbette. After some patrols in the North Sea, her rear turret was removed and another flight deck added. Her aircraft attacked the Zeppelin sheds during the Tondern raid in July 1918.

All three ships were laid up after the war, but were rebuilt into the Courageous-class aircraft carriers during the 1920s. Glorious and Courageous were sunk early in the Second World War and Furious was sold for scrap in 1948.

== Design and description ==
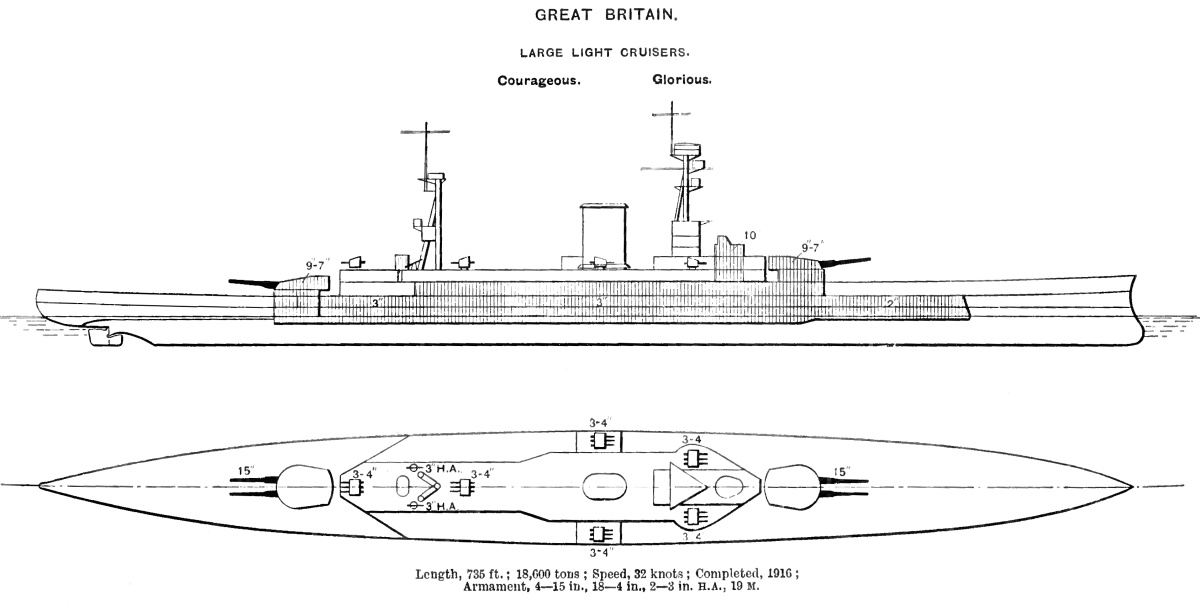
Right elevation and plan view of the Courageous class from Brassey's Naval Annual 1923

The first two Courageous-class battlecruisers were designed in 1915 to meet a set of requirements laid down by the First Sea Lord, Admiral Fisher, with his Baltic Project in mind. They were to be large enough to ensure that they could maintain their speed in heavy weather, have a powerful armament and a speed of at least 32 knots (59 km/h; 37 mph) to allow them to outrun enemy light cruisers. Their protection was to be light for a cruiser, with 3 inches (76 mm) of armour between the waterline and the forecastle deck, anti-torpedo bulges amidships and the machinery as far inboard as possible, protected by triple torpedo bulkheads. Shallow draught was of the utmost importance and all other factors were to be subordinated to this. The Director of Naval Construction (DNC), Sir Eustace Tennyson-d'Eyncourt, responded on 23 February 1915 with a smaller version of the Renown-class battlecruisers with one less gun turret and reduced armour protection. The Chancellor of the Exchequer had forbidden any further construction of ships larger than light cruisers in 1915, so Fisher designated the ships as "large light cruisers" to evade this prohibition. If this restriction had not been in place, the ships would have been built as improved versions of the preceding Renown class. The two ships were laid down a few months later under a veil of secrecy, so they became known in the Royal Navy as "Lord Fisher's hush-hush cruisers" and their odd design also earned them the nickname of the Outrageous class.

Their half-sister Furious was designed a few months later to meet a revised requirement specifying an armament of two BL 18-inch Mk I guns, the largest guns ever fitted on a Royal Navy ship, in single turrets with the ability to use twin 15-inch (381 mm) gun turrets if the 18-inch guns were unsatisfactory. Gunnery experts criticized this decision because the long time between salvoes would make spotting corrections useless and reduce the rate of fire and thus the probability of a direct hit. Her secondary armament was upgraded to BL 5.5-inch (140 mm) Mk I guns, rather than the 4-inch (102 mm) guns used by the first two ships, to compensate for the weakness of the two main guns against fast-moving targets like destroyers. Her displacement and beam were increased over that of her half-sisters with slightly less draught.

The Baltic Project was only one justification for the ships. Admiral Fisher wrote in a letter to the DNC on 16 March 1915: "I've told the First Lord that the more that I consider the qualities of your design of the Big Light Battle Cruisers, the more that I am impressed by its exceeding excellence and simplicity—all the three vital requisites of gunpower, speed and draught so well balanced!" In fact they could be considered the epitome of Fisher's belief in the paramount importance of speed over everything else. Fisher's adherence to this principle is highlighted in a letter he wrote to Churchill concerning the battleships of the 1912–13 Naval Estimates. In the letter, dated April 1912, Fisher stated: "There must be sacrifice of armour ... There must be further VERY GREAT INCREASE IN SPEED ... your speed must vastly exceed [that of] your possible enemy!"

Fisher's desire for a shallow draught was not merely based on the need to allow for inshore operations; ships tended to operate closer to deep load than anticipated and were often found lacking in freeboard, reserve buoyancy and safety against underwater attack. This experience led the DNC to reconsider the proportions of the hull to rectify the problems identified thus far. The Courageous-class ships were the first products of that re-evaluation.

=== General characteristics ===
The Courageous-class ships had an overall length of 786 feet 9 inches (239.8 m), a beam of 81 feet (24.7 m), and a draught of 25 feet 10 inches (7.9 m) at deep load. They displaced 19,180 long tons (19,490 t) normally and 22,560 long tons (22,922 t) at deep load. They had a metacentric height of 6 feet (1.8 m) at deep load and a complete double bottom.

Their half-sister Furious was the same length, but had a beam of 88 feet (26.8 m) and a draught of 24 feet 11 inches (7.6 m) at deep load. She displaced 19,513 long tons (19,826 t) at load and 22,890 long tons (23,257 t) at deep load. She had a metacentric height of 5.33 feet (1.6 m) at deep load.

=== Propulsion ===
To save weight and space the Courageous-class ships were the first large warships in the Royal Navy to have geared steam turbines and small-tube boilers despite the latter's significantly heavier maintenance requirements. Furthermore, to save design time, the turbine installation used in the light cruiser Champion, the navy's first cruiser with geared turbines, was simply doubled. The Parsons turbines were arranged in two engine rooms and each of the turbines drove one of the four propeller shafts. Furious's propellers were 11 feet 6 inches (3.5 m) in diameter. The turbines were powered by eighteen Yarrow boilers equally divided among three boiler rooms. They were designed to produce a total of 90,000 shaft horsepower (67,113 kW) at a working pressure of 235 psi (1,620 kPa; 17 kgf/cm^{2}), but achieved slightly more than that during Glorious's trials, although she did not reach her designed speed of 32 knots (59 km/h; 37 mph).

They were designed to normally carry 750 long tons (762 t) of fuel oil, but could carry a maximum of 3,160 long tons (3,211 t). At full capacity, they could steam for an estimated 6,000 nautical miles (11,110 km; 6,900 mi) at a speed of 20 knots (37 km/h; 23 mph).

=== Armament ===
The Courageous-class ships mounted four BL 15-inch Mark I guns in two twin hydraulically powered Mark I turrets, one each fore (designated the 'A' turret) and aft (the 'Y' turret). These turrets were originally intended for a Revenge-class battleship that was canceled shortly after the war began. The guns could be depressed to −3° and elevated to 20°; they could be loaded at any angle up to 20°, although loading at high angles tended to slow the gun's return to battery (firing position). The ships carried 120 shells per gun. They fired 1,910-pound (866 kg) projectiles at a muzzle velocity of 2,575 ft/s (785 m/s); this provided a maximum range of 23,734 yd (21,702 m) with armour-piercing shells.

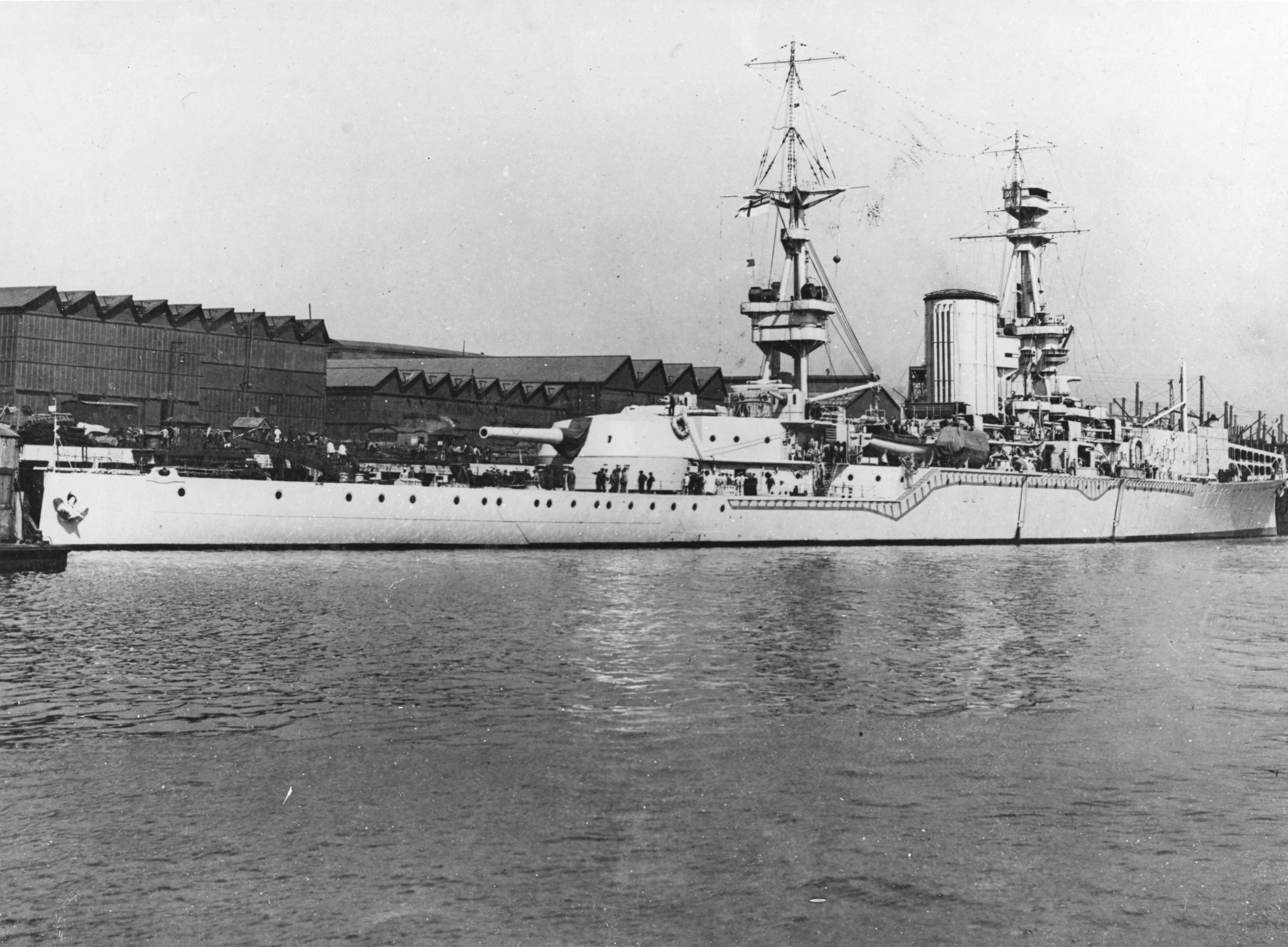
Furious had a single 18-inch gun fitted

The Courageous-class ships were designed with 18 BL 4-inch Mark IX guns, fitted in six triple mounts. These were manually powered and quite cumbersome in use as they required a crew of thirty-two men to load and train the guns. The gun's rate of fire was only 10 to 12 rounds per minute as the loaders kept getting in each other's way. They had a maximum depression of −10° and a maximum elevation of 30°. They fired a 22-pound (10.0 kg) high explosive shell at a muzzle velocity of 2,625 ft/s (800 m/s). At maximum elevation the guns had a maximum range of 13,500 yards (12,344 m). The ships carried 120 rounds for each gun.

Each ship mounted a pair of QF 3 inch 20 cwt (Note: "cwt" is the abbreviation for hundredweight, 30 cwt referring to the weight of the gun.) anti-aircraft guns on single high-angle Mark II mountings. These were mounted abreast the mainmast in the Courageous-class ships and before the funnel on Furious. The gun had a maximum depression of 10° and a maximum elevation of 90°. It fired a 12.5-pound (5.7 kg) shell at a muzzle velocity of 2,500 ft/s (760 m/s) at a rate of fire of 12–14 rounds per minute. They had a maximum effective ceiling of 23,500 ft (7,200 m). All three ships carried ten torpedoes and mounted two 21-inch (533 mm) submerged side-loading torpedo tubes fitted near 'A' turret. They were loaded and traversed by hydraulic power, but fired by compressed air.

The 18-inch BL Mark I gun carried by Furious was derived from the 15-inch Mark I gun used in her half-sisters. It was intended to be mounted in two single-gun turrets derived from the twin-gun 15-inch Mark I/N turret, and her barbettes were designed to accommodate either turret in case problems arose with the 18-inch gun's development, but only one turret was actually fitted. The gun could depress to −3° and elevate to a maximum of 30°. It fired a 3,320-pound (1,510 kg), 4 crh armour-piercing, capped shell at a muzzle velocity of 2,270 ft/s (690 m/s) to a distance of 28,900 yards (26,400 m). It could fire one round per minute and the ship carried sixty rounds of ammunition. The turret's revolving mass was 826 long tons (839 t), only slightly more than the 810 long tons (823 t) of its predecessor.

Furious's secondary armament consisted of 11 BL 5.5-inch Mk I guns. The guns had a maximum elevation of 25° on their pivot mounts. They fired 82-pound (37 kg) projectiles at a muzzle velocity of 2,790 ft/s (850 m/s) at a rate of 12 rounds per minute. Their maximum range was 16,000 yd (15,000 m) at 25° elevation.

=== Fire control ===
The main guns of the Courageous-class ships could be controlled from either of the two fire-control directors. The primary director was mounted above the conning tower in an armoured hood and the other was in the fore-top on the foremast. The secondary armament was also director-controlled. Each turret was provided with a 15-foot (4.6 m) rangefinder in an armoured housing on the turret roof. The fore-top was equipped with a 9-foot (2.7 m) rangefinder as was the torpedo control tower above the rear superstructure. The anti-aircraft guns were controlled by a simple 2-metre (6 ft 7 in) rangefinder mounted on the aft superstructure.

=== Protection ===
Unlike on other British battlecruisers, the bulk of the armour of the Courageous-class ships was made from high-tensile steel, a type of steel used structurally in other ships. Their waterline belt consisted of 2 inches (51 mm) covered by a 1-inch (25 mm) skin. It ran from barbette to barbette with a one-inch extension forward to the two-inch forward bulkhead well short of the bow. The belt had a height of 23 feet (7.0 m), of which 18 inches (0.5 m) was below the designed waterline. From the forward barbette a three-inch bulkhead extended out to the ship's side between the upper and lower decks and a comparable bulkhead was in place at the rear barbette as well. Four decks were armoured with thicknesses varying from .75 to 3 inches (19 to 76 mm), with the greatest thicknesses over the magazines and the steering gear. After the loss of three battlecruisers to magazine explosions during the Battle of Jutland, 110 long tons (112 t) of extra protection was added to the deck around the magazines.

The turrets, barbettes and conning tower were made from Krupp cemented armour. The turret faces were 9 inches (229 mm) thick while their sides ranged from 7 to 9 inches (178 to 229 mm) in thickness and the roof was 4.5 inches (114 mm) thick. The barbettes had a maximum thickness of 6 to 7 inches (152 to 178 mm) above the main deck, but reduced in thickness to 3 to 4 inches (76 to 102 mm) between the lower and main decks. The conning tower armour was 10 inches (254 mm) thick and it had a three-inch roof. The primary fire-control director atop the conning tower was protected by an armoured hood. The face of the hood was six inches thick, its sides were two inches thick and its roof was protected by three inches of armour. A communications tube with three-inch sides ran from the conning tower down to the lower conning position on the main deck. The torpedo bulkheads were increased during building from .75 inches (19 mm) to 1.5 inches (38 mm) in thickness.

All three ships were fitted with a shallow anti-torpedo bulge integral to the hull which was intended to explode the torpedo before it hit the hull proper and vent the underwater explosion to the surface rather than into the ship. However, later testing proved that it was not deep enough to accomplish its task as it lacked the layers of empty and full compartments that were necessary to absorb the force of the explosion.

== Ships ==
Ship	Builder	Laid down	Launched	Completed	Fate	Ultimate Fate
Courageous subgroup
Courageous	Armstrong Whitworth, Elswick	28 March 1915	5 February 1916	28 October 1916	Taken for conversion to aircraft carrier, June 1924	Sunk by U-29, 17 September 1939
Glorious	Harland and Wolff, Belfast, Northern Ireland	1 May 1915	20 April 1916	14 October 1916	Taken for conversion to aircraft carrier, February 1924	Sunk by Scharnhorst and Gneisenau, 8 June 1940
Furious subgroup
Furious	Armstrong Whitworth, Elswick	8 June 1915	18 August 1916	26 June 1917	Taken for conversion to aircraft carrier, November 1917	Sold for scrap, 1948

== Service ==
During her sea trials in November 1916 off the River Tyne, Courageous sustained structural damage while running at full speed in a rough head sea. The forecastle deck was deeply buckled in three places between the breakwater and the forward turret. In addition, the side plating was visibly buckled between the forecastle and upper decks. Water had entered the submerged torpedo room and rivets had sheared in the vertical flange of the angle iron securing the deck armour in place. The exact cause remains uncertain, but Courageous received 130 long tons (132 t) of stiffening in response; Glorious did not receive her stiffening until 1918. Courageous also was temporarily fitted as a minelayer in April 1917, but never actually laid any mines. In mid-1917 both ships received a dozen torpedo tubes in pairs: one mount on each side of the mainmast on the upper deck and two mounts on each side of the rear turret on the quarterdeck. Courageous and Glorious served together throughout the war. Both ships were initially assigned to the 3rd Light Cruiser Squadron and later reconstituted the 1st Cruiser Squadron (CS).

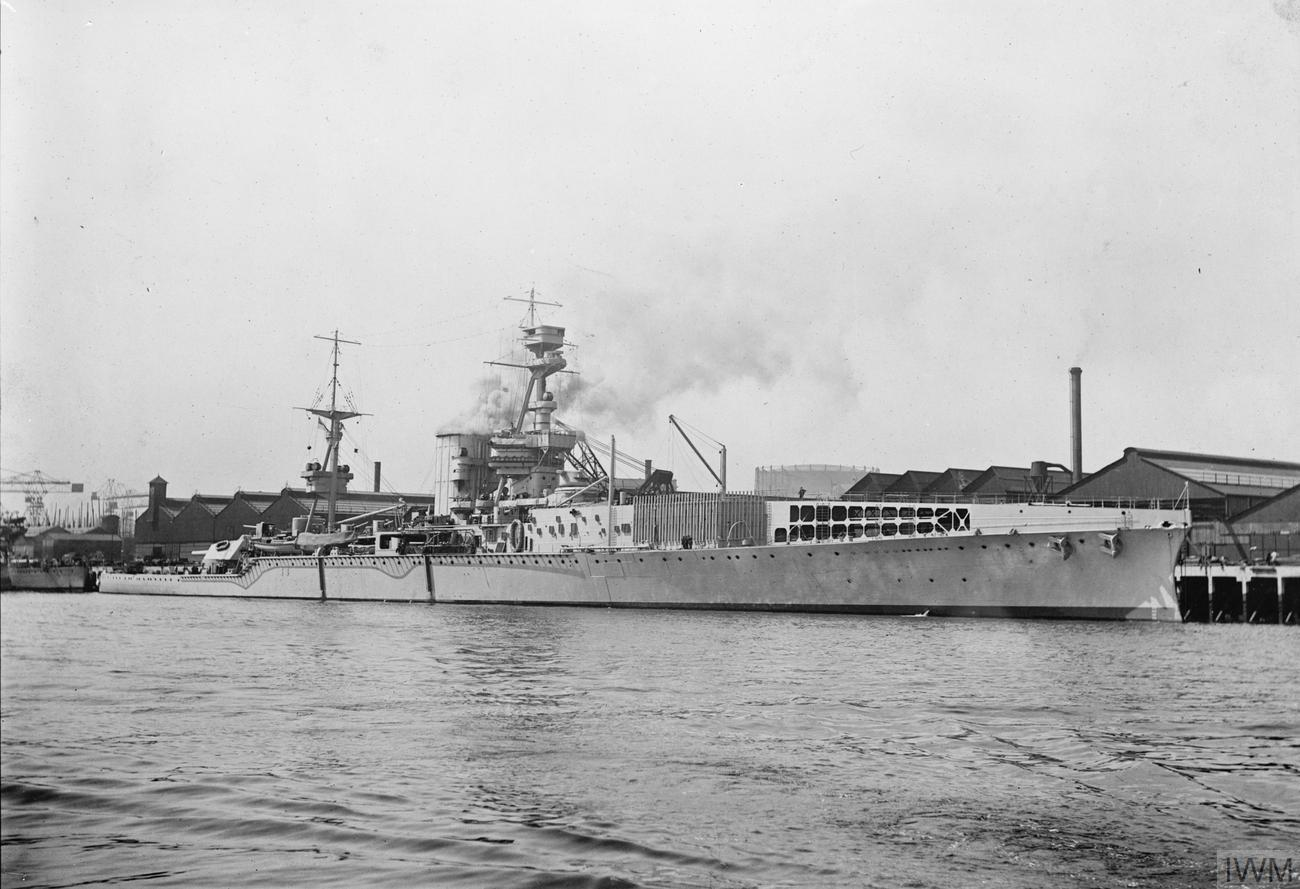
Furious as originally completed

Even as she was being built, Furious was modified with a large hangar capable of housing ten aircraft on her forecastle replacing the forward turret. A 160-foot (49 m) flight deck was built along its roof. Aircraft were flown off and, less successfully, landed on this deck. Although the aft turret was fitted and the gun trialled, it was not long before Furious returned to her builders for further modifications. In November 1917 the rear turret was replaced by a 300-foot (91 m) deck for landing aircraft over another hangar. Her funnel and superstructure remained intact, with a narrow strip of decking around them to connect the fore and aft flight decks. Turbulence from the funnel and superstructure was severe enough that only three landing attempts were successful before further attempts were forbidden. Her 18-inch guns were reused on the Lord Clive-class monitors General Wolfe and Lord Clive during the war.

All three ships were in the 1st CS of which Courageous was flagship when the Admiralty received word of German ship movements on 16 October 1917, possibly indicating some sort of raid. Admiral Beatty, commander of the Grand Fleet, ordered most of his light cruisers and destroyers to sea in an effort to locate the enemy ships. Furious was detached from the 1st CS and ordered to sweep along the 56th parallel as far as 4° East and to return before dark. The other two ships were not initially ordered to sea, but were sent to reinforce the 2nd Light Cruiser Squadron patrolling the central part of the North Sea later that day. Two German Brummer-class light cruisers managed to slip through the gaps in the British patrols and destroyed a convoy headed to Scandinavia during the morning of 17 October, but no word was received of the engagement until that afternoon. The 1st CS was ordered to attempt to intercept the German ships, but they proved to be too fast and the British ships were unsuccessful.

=== Second Battle of Heligoland Bight ===
Over the course of 1917 the Admiralty was becoming more concerned about German efforts in the North Sea to sweep paths through the British-laid minefields intended to restrict the actions of the High Seas Fleet and German submarines. A preliminary raid on German minesweeping forces on 31 October by light forces destroyed ten small ships and the Admiralty decided on a larger operation to destroy the minesweepers and their escorting light cruisers. Based on intelligence reports the Admiralty decided on 17 November 1917 to allocate two light cruiser squadrons, the 1st CS covered by the reinforced 1st Battlecruiser Squadron and, more distantly, the battleships of the 1st Battle Squadron to the operation.

The German ships, four light cruisers of II Scouting Force, eight destroyers, three divisions of minesweepers, eight Sperrbrechers (cork-filled trawlers, used to detonate mines without sinking) and two trawlers to mark the swept route, were spotted at 7:30 a.m., (Note: The times used in this article are in UTC, which is one hour behind CET, which is often used in German works.) silhouetted by the rising sun. Courageous and the light cruiser Cardiff opened fire with their forward guns seven minutes later. The Germans responded by laying an effective smoke screen. The British continued in pursuit, but lost track of most of the smaller ships in the smoke and concentrated fire on the light cruisers as opportunity permitted. One 15-inch hit was made on a gun shield of SMS Pillau, but it did not affect her speed. At 8:33 the left-hand gun in Glorious's forward turret was wrecked when a shell detonated inside the gun barrel. At 9:30 the 1st CS broke off their pursuit so they would not enter a minefield marked on their maps; the ships turned south, playing no further role in the battle. The German ships had too much of a lead to be caught by the British ships before they had to turn to avoid the minefield.

Both ships had taken minor damage from their own muzzle blasts, and Glorious required five days of repairs. Courageous fired 92 rounds of 15-inch while Glorious fired 57, scoring only the single hit on Pillau between them. They also fired 180 and 213 four-inch shells respectively. Courageous's mine fittings were removed after the battle and both ships received flying-off platforms on top of their turrets in 1918. A Sopwith Camel was carried on the rear turret and a Sopwith 1½ Strutter on the forward turret.

Furious was recommissioned on 15 March 1918 and her embarked aircraft were used on anti-Zeppelin patrols in the North Sea after May. In July 1918 she flew off seven Sopwith Camels which participated in the Tondern raid, attacking the Zeppelin sheds at Tondern with moderate success. All three ships were present at the surrender of the German fleet on 21 November 1918.

=== Post-war history ===
Courageous was reduced to reserve at Rosyth on 1 February 1919 before being assigned to the Gunnery School at Devonport the following year as a turret drill ship. She became flagship of the Rear-Admiral Commanding the Reserve at Devonport in March 1920. Glorious was also reduced to reserve at Rosyth on 1 February and served as a turret-drill ship, but succeeded her sister as flagship between 1921 and 1922. Furious was placed in reserve 21 November 1919 before beginning reconstruction as an aircraft carrier in 1921.

The Washington Naval Treaty of 1922 required the signatory nations to severely curtail their plans for new warships and scrap many existing warships to meet its tonnage limits. Up to 66,000 long tons (67,000 t) of existing ships, however, could be converted into aircraft carriers, and the Royal Navy chose to convert the Courageous-class ships because of their high speed. Each ship was reconstructed with a full-length flight deck during the 1920s. Their 15-inch turrets were placed into storage and later reused during the Second World War for HMS Vanguard, the Royal Navy's last battleship.

As the first large, or "fleet", carrier completed by the Royal Navy, Furious was extensively used to evaluate aircraft handling and landing procedures, including the first ever carrier night-landing in 1926. Courageous became the first warship lost by the Royal Navy in the Second World War II when she was torpedoed in September 1939. Glorious unsuccessfully hunted the Admiral Graf Spee in the Indian Ocean in 1939. She participated in the Norwegian Campaign in 1940, but was sunk by the German battleships Scharnhorst and Gneisenau on 8 June 1940 in the North Sea. Furious spent the first months of the war hunting for German raiders and escorting convoys before she began to support British forces in Norway. She spent most of 1940 in Norwegian waters making attacks on German installations and shipping, and most of 1941 ferrying aircraft to West Africa, Gibraltar and Malta before refitting in the United States. She ferried aircraft to Malta during 1942 and provided air support to British forces during Operation Torch. Furious spent most of 1943 training with the Home Fleet, but made numerous air strikes against the Tirpitz and other targets in Norway in 1944. She was worn out by late 1944 and was reduced to reserve in September before being decommissioned the following year. Furious was sold in 1948 for scrap.
