= HMS Courageous (50) =

British battlecruiser, 1916–1939

Coordinates: 50°10′N 14°45′W

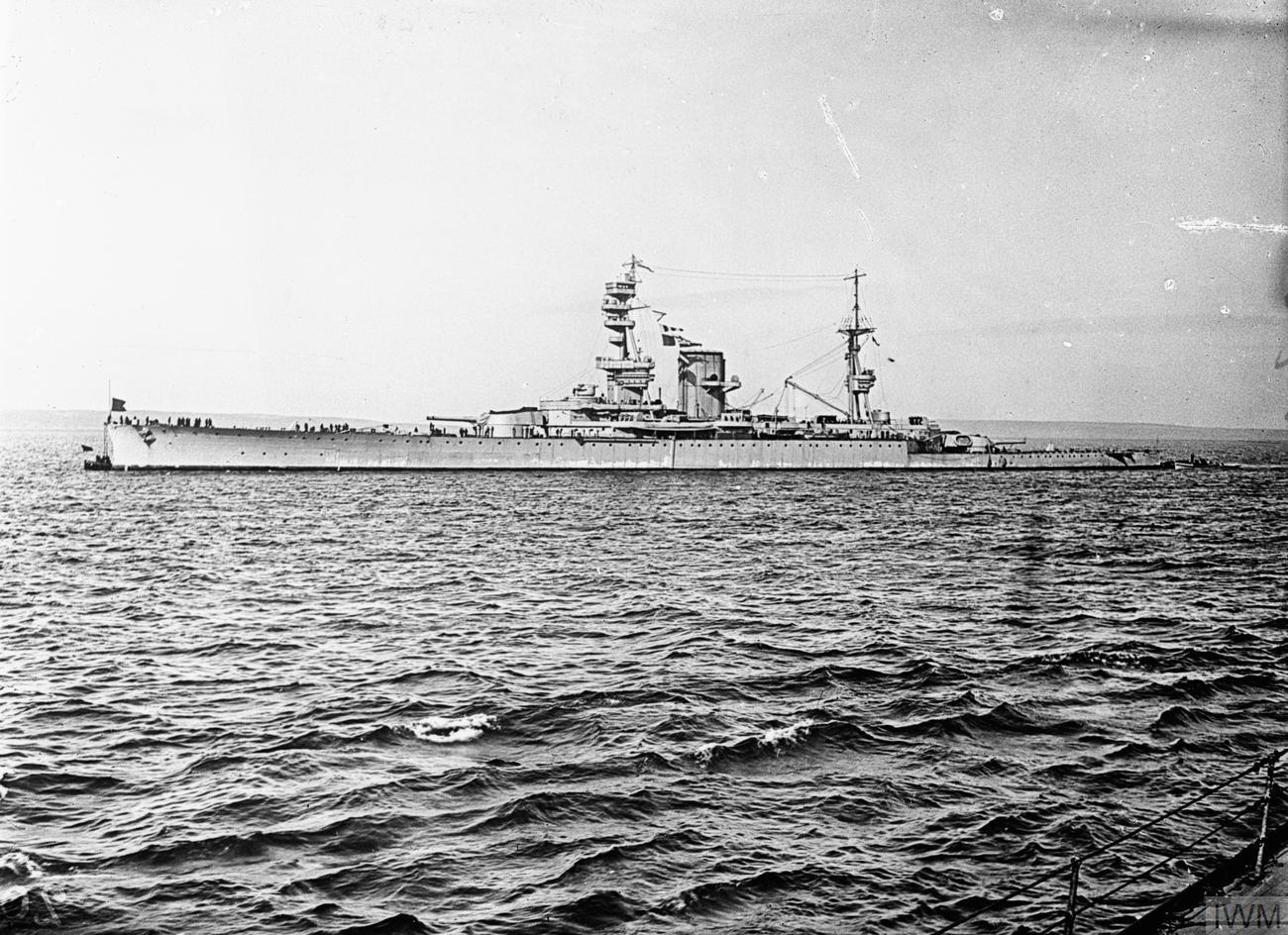
- Courageous shortly after completion in 1916

History

United Kingdom
- Name: Courageous
- Ordered: 14 March 1915
- Builder: Armstrong Whitworth
- Cost: £2,038,225
- Yard number: 895
- Laid down: 26 March 1915
- Launched: 5 February 1916
- Completed: 4 November 1916
- Reclassified: Converted to aircraft carrier, June 1924 – February 1928
- Identification: Pennant number: 50
- Nickname(s): Outrageous
- Fate: Sunk in the North Atlantic, 17 September 1939

General characteristics as battlecruiser
- Class & type: Courageous-class battlecruiser
- Displacement: 19,180 long tons (19,490 t) (normal); 22,560 long tons (22,920 t) (deep load)
- Length: 786 ft 9 in (239.8 m)
- Beam: 81 ft (24.7 m)
- Draught: 25 ft 10 in (7.9 m)
- Installed power: 18 Yarrow boilers; 90,000 shp (67,000 kW)
- Propulsion: 4 shafts; 4 geared steam turbines
- Speed: 32 knots (59 km/h; 37 mph)
- Range: 6,000 nmi (11,000 km; 6,900 mi) at 20 knots (37 km/h; 23 mph)
- Complement: 842
- Armament: 2 × twin 15 in (381 mm) guns; 6 × triple 4 in (102 mm guns); 2 × single 3 in (76 mm) AA guns; 2 × single 21 in (533 mm) torpedo tubes
- Armour: Belt: 2–3 in (51–76 mm); Decks: 0.75–3 in (19–76 mm); Barbettes: 3–7 in (76–178 mm); Gun turrets: 7–9 in (178–229 mm); Conning tower: 10 in (254 mm); Torpedo bulkheads: 1–1.5 in (25–38 mm)
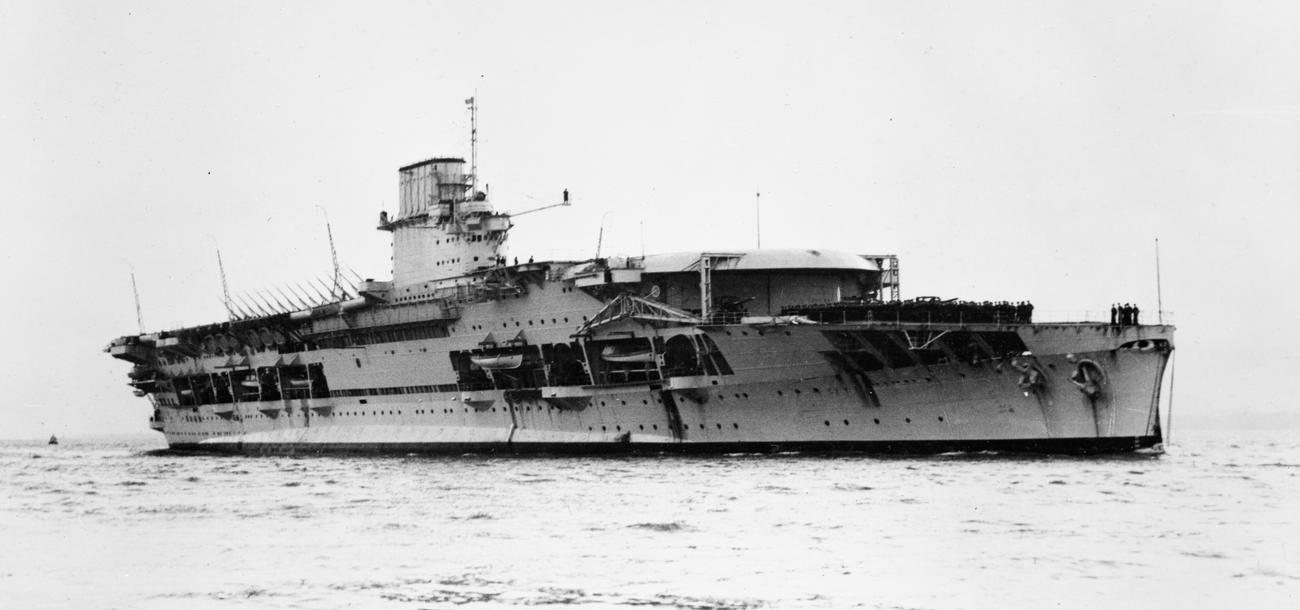
- Courageous as an aircraft carrier in 1935

General characteristics as aircraft carrier
- Class & type: Courageous-class aircraft carrier
- Displacement: 24,210 long tons (24,600 t) (normal); 26,990 long tons (27,420 t) (deep load)
- Length: 735 ft 1.5 in (224.1 m) (p/p); 786 ft 9 in (239.8 m) (o/a)
- Beam: 90 ft 6 in (27.6 m) (at waterline)
- Draught: 27 ft 9 in (8.5 m)
- Installed power: 18 Yarrow boilers; 90,000 shp (67,000 kW)
- Propulsion: 4 shafts, 4 geared steam turbines
- Speed: 30 knots (56 km/h; 35 mph)
- Range: 5,860 nautical miles (10,850 km; 6,740 mi) at 16 knots (30 km/h; 18 mph)
- Complement: 814 + 403 air group (1938)
- Armament: 16 × single 4.7 in (120 mm) AA guns
- Armour: Belt: 2–3 in (51–76 mm); Decks: .75–1 in (19–25 mm); Bulkhead: 2–3 in (51–76 mm); Torpedo bulkheads: 1–1.5 in (25–38 mm)
- Aircraft carried: 48

HMS Courageous was the lead ship of her class of three battlecruisers built for the Royal Navy in the First World War. Designed to support the Baltic Project championed by First Sea Lord John Fisher, the ship was very lightly armoured and armed with only a few heavy guns. Courageous was completed in late 1916 and spent the war patrolling the North Sea. She participated in the Second Battle of Heligoland Bight in November 1917 and was present when the German High Seas Fleet surrendered a year later.

Courageous and Glorious were decommissioned after the war and laid up, then rebuilt as aircraft carriers in the mid-1920s. Courageous and Glorious could carry 48 aircraft, compared with 36 carried by their half-sister Furious on about the same displacement. After recommissioning Courageous spent most of her career operating off Great Britain and Ireland. She briefly became a training ship, but reverted to her normal role a few months before the start of the Second World War in September 1939. Later that month, the German U-boat U-29 torpedoed Courageous, which sank with the loss of more than 500 of her crew.

== Origin and construction ==
In the First World War, Admiral Fisher was prevented from ordering an improved version of the preceding Renown-class battlecruisers by a wartime restriction that banned construction of ships larger than light cruisers in 1915. To obtain ships suitable for the doctrinal roles of battlecruisers, such as scouting for fleets and hunting enemy raiders, he settled on ships with the minimal armour of a light cruiser and the armament of a battlecruiser. He justified their existence by claiming he needed fast, shallow-draught ships for his Baltic Project, a plan to invade Germany via its Baltic coast.

Courageous had an overall length of 786 feet 9 inches (239.8 m), a beam of 81 feet (24.7 m), and a draught of 25 feet 10 inches (7.9 m) at deep load. She displaced 19,180 long tons (19,490 t) at load and 22,560 long tons (22,922 t) at deep load. Courageous and her sisters were the first large warships in the Royal Navy to have geared steam turbines. To save design time, the installation used in the light cruiser Champion, the first cruiser in the navy with geared turbines, was simply replicated for four turbine sets. The Parsons turbines were powered by eighteen Yarrow small-tube boilers. They were designed to produce a total of 90,000 shaft horsepower (67 MW) at a working pressure of 235 psi (1,620 kPa; 17 kgf/cm^{2}). The ship reached an estimated 30.8 knots (57.0 km/h; 35.4 mph) on sea trials.

The ship's normal design load was 750 long tons (762 t) of fuel oil, but she could carry a maximum of 3,160 long tons (3,211 t). At full capacity, she could steam for an estimated 6,000 nautical miles (11,110 km; 6,900 mi) at a speed of 20 knots (37 km/h; 23 mph).

Courageous carried four BL 15-inch Mk I guns in two hydraulically powered twin gun turrets, designated 'A' and 'Y' from front to rear. Her secondary armament consisted of eighteen BL 4-inch Mk IX guns mounted in six manually powered mounts. The mount placed three breeches too close together, causing the 23 loaders to get in one another's way, and preventing the intended high rate of fire. A pair of QF 3-inch 20 cwt (Note: "cwt" is the abbreviation for hundredweight, 30 cwt referring to the weight of the gun.) anti-aircraft guns were fitted abreast the mainmast on Courageous. She mounted two submerged tubes for 21-inch torpedoes and carried 10 torpedoes for them.

== First World War ==
Courageous was laid down on 26 March 1915, launched on 5 February 1916 and completed on 4 November. On her sea trials later that month, she sustained structural damage while running at full speed in a rough head sea; the exact cause is uncertain. The forecastle deck was deeply buckled in three places between the breakwater and the forward turret. The side plating was visibly buckled between the forecastle and upper decks. Water had entered the submerged torpedo room and rivets had sheared in the angle irons securing the deck armour in place. The ship was stiffened with 130 long tons (130 t) of steel in response. As of 23 November 1916, she cost £2,038,225 to build.

Upon commissioning, Courageous was assigned to the 3rd Light Cruiser Squadron of the Grand Fleet. She became flagship of the 1st Cruiser Squadron near the end of 1916 when that unit was re-formed after most of its ships had been sunk at the Battle of Jutland in May. The ship was temporarily fitted as a minelayer in April 1917 by the addition of mine rails on her quarterdeck that could hold over 200 mines, but never laid any mines. In mid-1917, she received half a dozen torpedo mounts, each with two tubes: one mount on each side of the mainmast on the upper deck and two mounts on each side of the rear turret on the quarterdeck. On 30 July 1917, Rear-Admiral Trevylyan Napier assumed command of the 1st Cruiser Squadron and was appointed Acting Vice-Admiral Commanding the Light Cruiser Force until he was relieved on 26 October 1918.

On 16 October 1917, the Admiralty received word of German ship movements, possibly indicating a raid. Admiral Beatty, the commander of the Grand Fleet, ordered most of his light cruisers and destroyers to sea in an effort to locate the enemy ships. Courageous and Glorious were not initially included amongst them, but were sent to reinforce the 2nd Light Cruiser Squadron patrolling the central part of the North Sea later that day. Two German Brummer-class light cruisers managed to slip through the gaps between the British patrols and destroy a convoy bound for Norway on the morning of 17 October, but no word was received of the engagement until that afternoon. The 1st Cruiser Squadron was ordered to intercept, but was unsuccessful as the German cruisers were faster than expected.

=== Second Battle of Heligoland Bight ===
Throughout 1917 the Admiralty was becoming more concerned about German efforts to sweep paths through the British-laid minefields intended to restrict the actions of the High Seas Fleet and German submarines. A preliminary raid on German minesweeping forces on 31 October by light forces destroyed ten small ships. Based on intelligence reports, the Admiralty allocated the 1st Cruiser Squadron on 17 November 1917, with cover provided by the reinforced 1st Battlecruiser Squadron and distant cover by the battleships of the 1st Battle Squadron, to destroy the minesweepers and their light cruiser escorts.

The German ships—four light cruisers of II Scouting Force, eight destroyers, three divisions of minesweepers, eight Sperrbrechers (cork-filled trawlers) and two other trawlers to mark the swept route—were spotted at 7:30 am. (Note: The times used in this article are in UTC, which is one hour behind CET, which is often used in German works.) Courageous and the light cruiser Cardiff opened fire with their forward guns seven minutes later. The Germans responded by laying an effective smoke screen. The British continued in pursuit, but lost track of most of the smaller ships in the smoke and concentrated fire on the light cruisers. Courageous fired 92 fifteen-inch shells and 180 four-inch shells in the battle, and the only damage she received was from her own muzzle blast. One fifteen-inch shell hit a gun shield of the light cruiser SMS Pillau but did not affect her speed. At 9:30 the 1st Cruiser Squadron broke off their pursuit so that they would not enter a minefield marked on their maps; the ships turned south, playing no further role in the battle.

After the battle, the mine fittings on Courageous were removed, and she spent the rest of the war intermittently patrolling the North Sea. In 1918, short take-off platforms were fitted for a Sopwith Camel and a Sopwith 1½ Strutter on both 15-inch (380 mm) turrets. The ship was present at the surrender of the German High Seas fleet on 21 November 1918. Courageous was placed in reserve at Rosyth on 1 February 1919 and she again became Napier's flagship as he was appointed Vice-Admiral Commanding the Rosyth Reserve until 1 May, The ship was assigned to the Gunnery School at Portsmouth the following year as a turret drill ship. She became flagship of the Rear-Admiral Commanding the Reserve at Portsmouth in March 1920. Captain Sidney Meyrick became her Flag Captain in 1920. He was relieved by Capt John Casement in August 1921.

== Between the wars ==
=== Conversion ===
The Washington Naval Treaty of 1922 severely limited capital ship tonnage, and the Royal Navy was forced to scrap many of its older battleships and battlecruisers. The treaty allowed the conversion of existing ships totalling up to 66,000 long tons (67,059 t) into aircraft carriers, and the Courageous class's combination of a large hull and high speed made these ships ideal candidates. The conversion of Courageous began on 29 June 1924 at Devonport. Her fifteen-inch turrets were placed into storage and reused in the Second World War for HMS Vanguard, the Royal Navy's last battleship. The conversion into an aircraft carrier cost £2,025,800.

The ship's new design improved on her half-sister HMS Furious, which lacked an island and a conventional funnel. All superstructure, guns, torpedo tubes, and fittings down to the main deck were removed. A two-storey hangar was built on top of the remaining hull; each level was 16 feet (4.9 m) high and 550 feet (167.6 m) long. The upper hangar level opened onto a short flying-off deck, below and forward of the main flight deck. The flying-off deck improved launch and recovery cycle flexibility until new fighters requiring longer takeoff rolls made the lower deck obsolete in the 1930s. Two 46-by-48-foot (14.0 m × 14.6 m) lifts were installed fore and aft in the flight deck. An island with the bridge, flying control station and funnel was added on the starboard side, since islands had been found not to contribute significantly to turbulence. By 1939 the ship could carry 34,500 imperial gallons (157,000 L; 41,400 US gal) of petrol for her aircraft.

Courageous received a dual-purpose armament of sixteen QF 4.7-inch Mk VIII guns in single HA Mark XII mounts. Each side of the lower flight deck had a mount, and two were on the quarterdeck. The remaining twelve mounts were distributed along the sides of the ship. In refits in the mid-1930s, Courageous received three quadruple Mk VII mounts for 40-millimetre (1.6 in) 2-pounder "pom-pom" anti-aircraft guns, two of which were transferred from the battleship Royal Sovereign. Each side of the flying-off deck had a mount, forward of the 4.7-inch guns, and one was behind the island on the flight deck. She also received four water-cooled .50-calibre Mk III anti-aircraft machine guns in a single quadruple mounting. This was placed in a sponson on the port side aft.

The reconstruction was completed on 21 February 1928, and the ship spent the next several months on trials and training before she was assigned to the Mediterranean Fleet to be based at Malta, in which she served from May 1928 to June 1930. In August 1929, the 1929 Palestine riots broke out, and Courageous was ordered to respond. When she arrived off Palestine, her air wing was disembarked to carry out operations to help to suppress the disorder. The ship was relieved from the Mediterranean by Glorious and refitted from June to August 1930. She was assigned to the Atlantic and Home Fleets from 12 August 1930 to December 1938, aside from a temporary attachment to the Mediterranean Fleet in 1936. In the early 1930s, traverse arresting gear was installed and she received two hydraulic aircraft catapults on the upper flight deck before March 1934. Courageous was refitted again between October 1935 and June 1936 with her pom-pom mounts. She was present at the Coronation Fleet Review at Spithead on 20 May 1937 for King George VI. The ship became a training carrier in December 1938 when Ark Royal joined the Home Fleet. She was relieved of that duty by her half-sister Furious in May 1939. Courageous participated in the Portland Fleet Review on 9 August 1939.

=== Air group ===
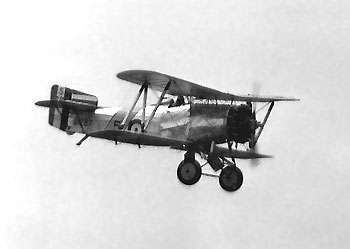
Fairey Flycatcher

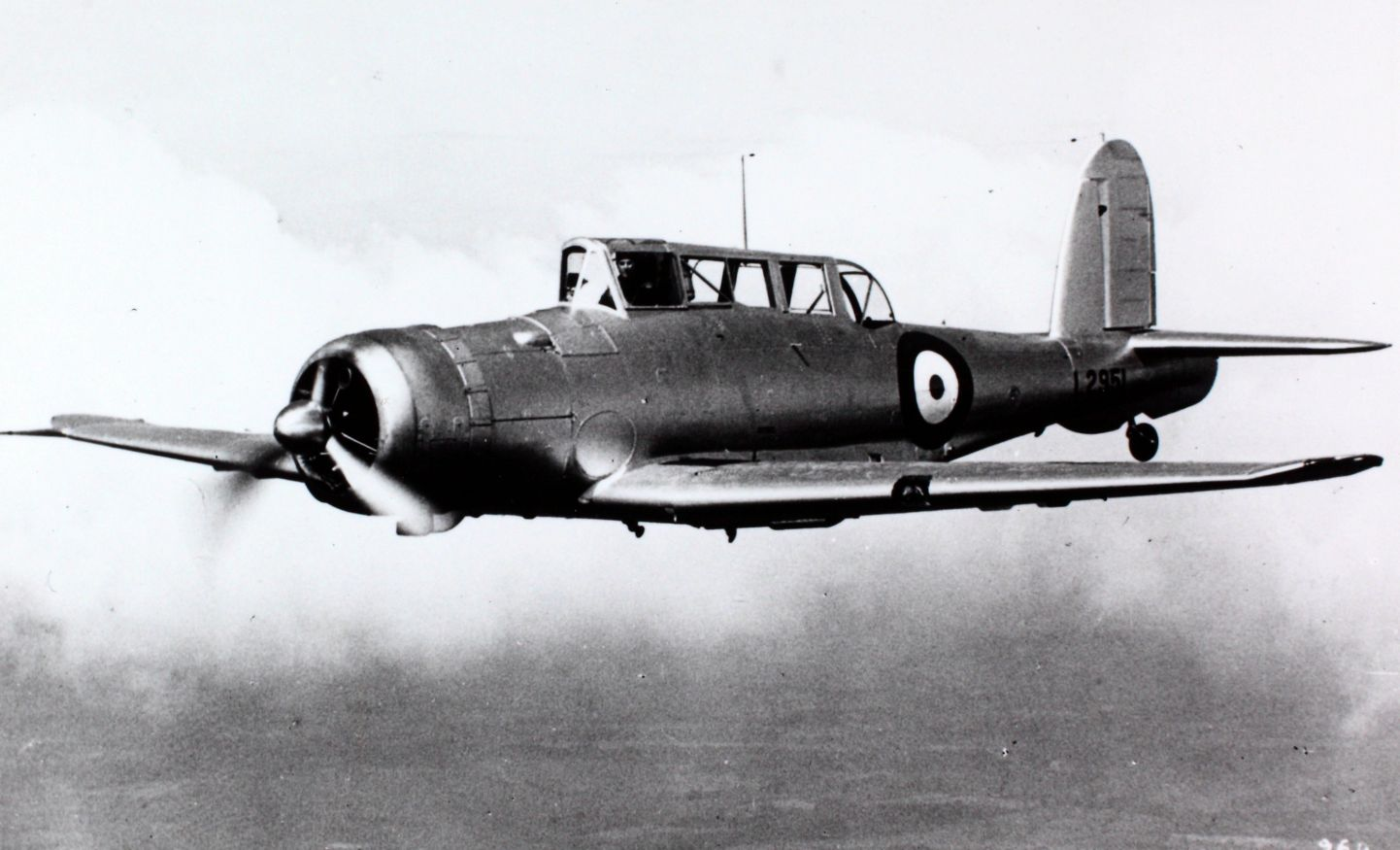
Blackburn Skua

Courageous could carry up to 48 aircraft; following completion of her trials and embarking stores and personnel, she sailed for Spithead on 14 May 1928. The following day, a Blackburn Dart of 463 Flight made the ship's first deck landing. The Dart was followed by the Fairey Flycatchers of 404 and 407 Flights, the Fairey IIIFs of 445 and 446 Flights and the Darts of 463 and 464 Flight. The ship sailed for Malta on 2 June to join the Mediterranean Fleet.

From 1933 to the end of 1938 Courageous carried No. 800 Squadron, which flew a mixture of nine Hawker Nimrod and three Hawker Osprey fighters. 810, 820 and 821 Squadrons were embarked for reconnaissance and anti-ship attack missions in the same period. They flew the Blackburn Baffin, the Blackburn Shark, the Blackburn Ripon and the Fairey Swordfish torpedo bombers as well as Fairey Seal reconnaissance aircraft. As a deck landing training carrier, in early 1939 Courageous embarked the Blackburn Skua and Gloster Sea Gladiator fighters of 801 Squadron and the Swordfish torpedo bombers of 811 Squadron, although both of these squadrons were disembarked when the ship was relieved of her training duties in May.

== Second World War and sinking ==
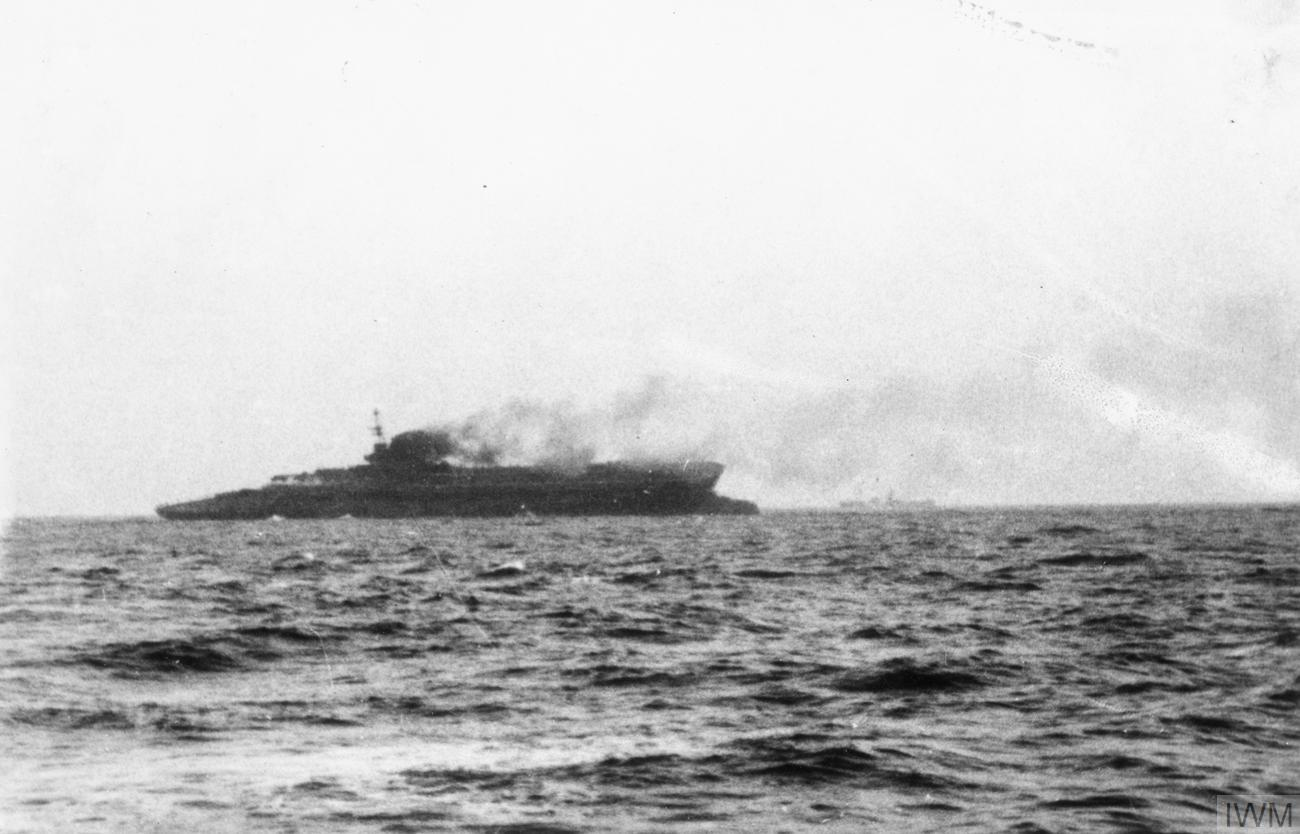
Courageous sinking after being torpedoed by U-29

Courageous served with the Home Fleet at the start of World War II with 811 and 822 Squadrons aboard, each squadron equipped with a dozen Fairey Swordfish. In the early days of the war, hunter-killer groups were formed around the fleet's aircraft carriers to find and destroy U-boats. On 31 August 1939 she went to her war station at Portland and embarked the two squadrons of Swordfish. Courageous departed Plymouth on the evening of 3 September 1939 for an anti-submarine patrol in the Western Approaches, escorted by four destroyers. On the evening of 17 September 1939, she was on one such patrol off the coast of Ireland. Two of her four escorting destroyers had been sent to help a merchant ship under attack and all her aircraft had returned from patrols. U-29, commanded by Captain-Lieutenant Otto Schuhart, stalked Courageous for more than two hours. The carrier then turned into the wind to launch her aircraft. This put the ship right across the bow of the submarine, which fired three torpedoes. Two of the torpedoes struck the ship on her port side before any aircraft took off, knocking out all electrical power, and she capsized and sank in 20 minutes with the loss of 519 of her crew, including her captain. The US cargo ship Collingsworth, Ellerman Lines cargo ship Dido, and Dutch ocean liner Veendam rescued survivors. The two escorting destroyers counterattacked U-29 for four hours, but the submarine escaped.

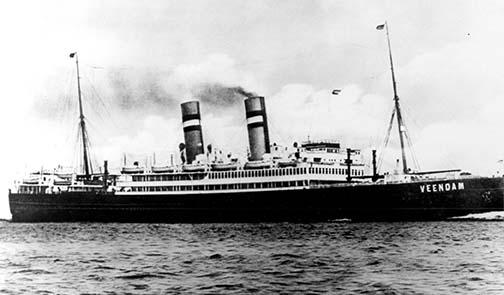
The liner Veendam

An earlier unsuccessful attack on Ark Royal by U-39 on 14 September, followed three days later by the sinking of Courageous, the first British ship sunk in the war in enemy action, prompted the Royal Navy to withdraw its carriers from anti-submarine patrols. Courageous was the first British warship to be sunk by German forces. (The submarine Oxley had been sunk a week earlier by friendly fire from the British submarine Triton.) The commander of the German submarine force, Commodore Karl Dönitz, regarded the sinking of Courageous as "a wonderful success" and it led to widespread jubilation in the Kriegsmarine (German navy). Grand Admiral Erich Raeder, commander of the Kriegsmarine, directed that Schuhart be awarded the Iron Cross First Class and that all other members of the crew receive the Iron Cross Second Class.
