= Baltic Project =

Cancelled World War I military operation

- Part of World War I
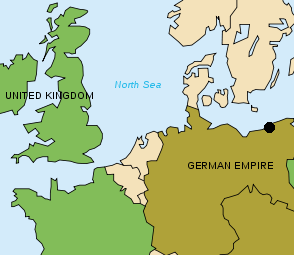
- The black dot signifies the approximate location of Pomerania, Germany, during the First World War.
- Operational scope: Pomerania, Germany
- Planned by: John Fisher, 1st Baron Fisher
- Objective: Amphibious invasion of Germany via landing in Pomerania and possible attack on Berlin with Russian or British soldiers.

The Baltic Project was a plan promoted by the British Admiral Lord Fisher to procure a speedy victory against Germany during the First World War. It involved landing a substantial force, either British or Russian soldiers, on the flat beaches of Pomerania on the North German coast, less than 100 mi (160 km) from Berlin.

Submarines and extensive numbers of mines would keep the invasion force safe from the Imperial German Navy. More than 600 vessels would be required, including landing craft, minesweepers, destroyers, light cruisers, monitors and some heavy shallow draft support ships. The latter were built in the form of the three Courageous-class battlecruisers, Courageous, Furious, and HMS Glorious. The plan was never implemented.

== See also ==
- Operation Catherine - a similar plan developed during the Second World War.
