= HMS Rodney (29) =

1927 Nelson-class battleship of the Royal Navy

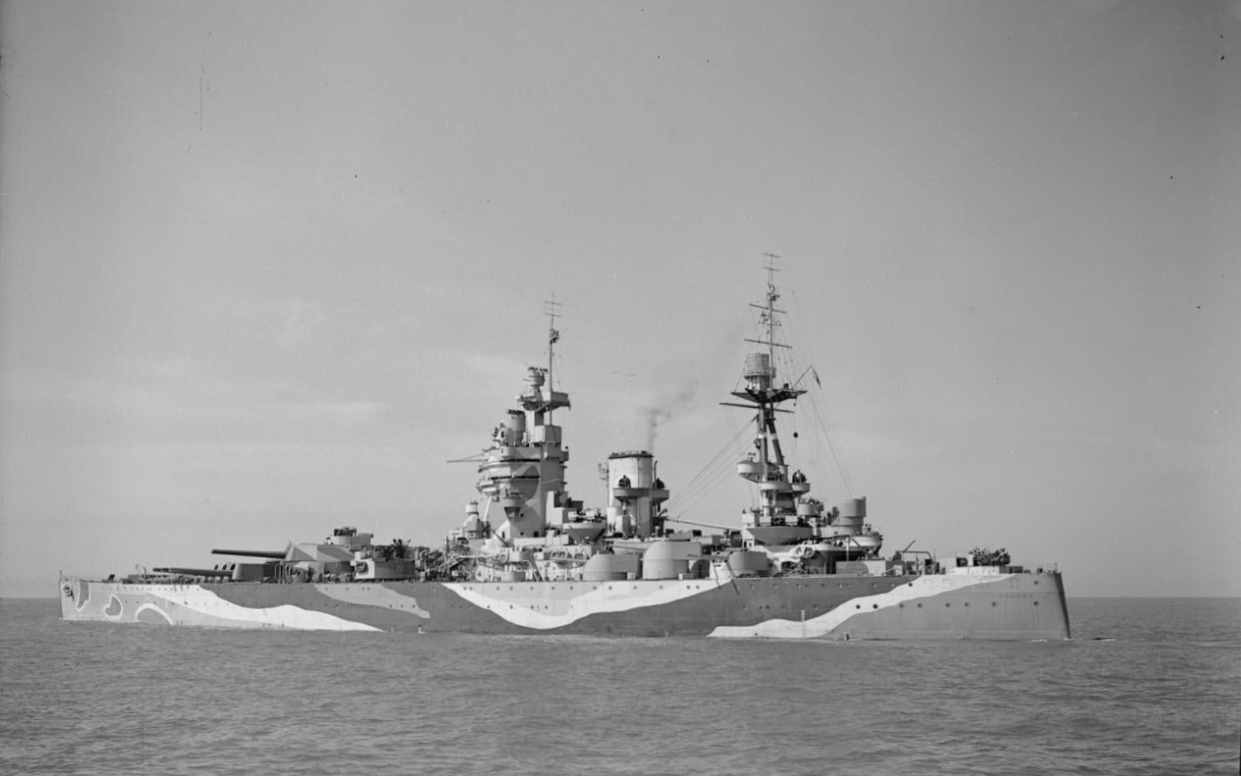
- Rodney in May 1942

History

United Kingdom
- Name: Rodney
- Namesake: Admiral Lord Rodney
- Ordered: 1922
- Builder: Cammell Laird, Birkenhead
- Laid down: 28 December 1922
- Launched: 17 December 1925
- Completed: August 1927
- Commissioned: 7 December 1927
- Decommissioned: 1946
- In service: 28 March 1928
- Out of service: August 1946
- Stricken: 1948
- Identification: Pennant number: 29
- Motto: Non Generant Aquilae Columbas; (Latin) "Eagles do not breed doves"
- Nickname(s): Rodnol
- Fate: Sold for scrap, 26 March 1948

General characteristics (as built)
- Class & type: Nelson-class battleship
- Displacement: 33,730 long tons (34,270 t) (standard)
- Length: 710 ft 3 in (216.5 m) o/a
- Beam: 106 ft (32.3 m)
- Draught: 30 ft 2 in (9.2 m) (mean standard)
- Installed power: 8 × Admiralty 3-drum boilers; 45,000 shp (34,000 kW)
- Propulsion: 2 shafts; 2 geared steam turbines
- Speed: 23 knots (43 km/h; 26 mph)
- Range: 7,000 nmi (13,000 km; 8,100 mi) at 16 knots (30 km/h; 18 mph)
- Complement: 1,314 (private ship)
- Armament: 3 × triple 16 in (406 mm) guns; 6 × twin 6 in (152 mm) guns; 6 × single 4.7 in (120 mm) AA guns; 8 × single 2 pdr (40 mm (1.6 in)) AA guns; 2 × 24.5 in (622 mm) torpedo tubes
- Armour: Waterline belt: 13–14 in (330–356 mm); Deck: 3.75–6.25 in (95–159 mm); Barbettes: 12–15 in (305–381 mm); Gun turrets: 9–16 in (229–406 mm)

HMS Rodney was one of two Nelson-class battleships built for the Royal Navy in the mid-1920s. The ship entered service in 1928, and spent her peacetime career with the Atlantic and Home Fleets, sometimes serving as a flagship when her sister ship, Nelson, was being refitted. During the early stages of the Second World War, she searched for German commerce raiders, participated in the Norwegian Campaign, and escorted convoys in the Atlantic Ocean. Rodney played a major role in the sinking of the German battleship Bismarck in mid-1941.

After a brief refit in the United States, she escorted convoys to Malta and supported the Allied invasion of French Algeria during Operation Torch in late 1942. The ship covered the invasions of Sicily (Operation Husky) and Italy (Operation Baytown) in mid-1943. During the Normandy landings in June 1944, Rodney provided naval gunfire support and continued to do so for several following offensives near the French city of Caen. The ship escorted one convoy through the Arctic to the Soviet Union in late 1944. In poor condition from extremely heavy use and a lack of refits, she was reduced to reserve in late 1945 and was scrapped in 1948.

== Background and description ==
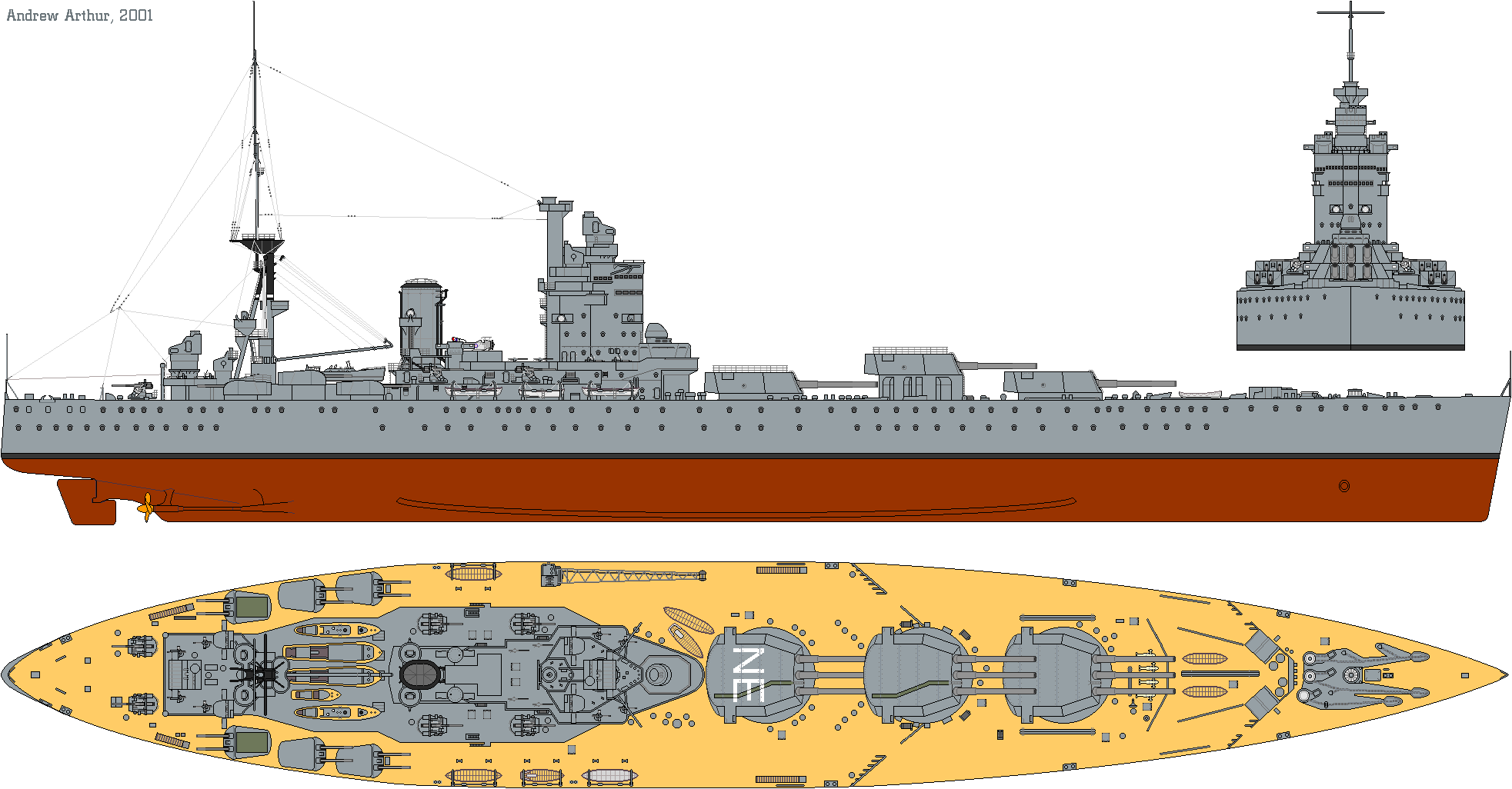
Profile drawing of Nelson as built

The Nelson-class battleship was essentially a smaller, 23-knot (43 km/h; 26 mph) battleship version of the G3 battlecruiser which had been cancelled for exceeding the constraints of the 1922 Washington Naval Treaty. The design, which had been approved six months after the treaty was signed, had a main armament of 16-inch (406 mm) guns to match the firepower of the American Colorado and Japanese Nagato classes in the battleline in a ship displacing no more than 35,000 long tons (36,000 t).

Rodney had a length between perpendiculars of 660 feet (201.2 m) and an overall length of 710 feet 3 inches (216.5 m), a beam of 106 feet (32.3 m), and a draught of 30 feet 2 inches (9.2 m) at standard load. She displaced 33,730 long tons (34,270 t) at standard load and 37,430 long tons (38,030 t) at deep load. Her crew numbered 1,361 officers and ratings when serving as a flagship and 1,314 as a private ship. The ship was powered by two sets of Brown-Curtis geared steam turbines, each driving one shaft, using steam from eight Admiralty 3-drum boilers. The turbines were rated at 45,000 shaft horsepower (34,000 kW) and intended to give the ship a maximum speed of 23 knots. During her sea trials on 7 September 1927, Rodney reached a top speed of 23.8 knots (44.1 km/h; 27.4 mph) from 45,614 shp (34,014 kW). The ship carried enough fuel oil to give her a range of 7,000 nautical miles (13,000 km; 8,100 mi) at a cruising speed of 16 knots (30 km/h; 18 mph).

=== Armament and fire control ===
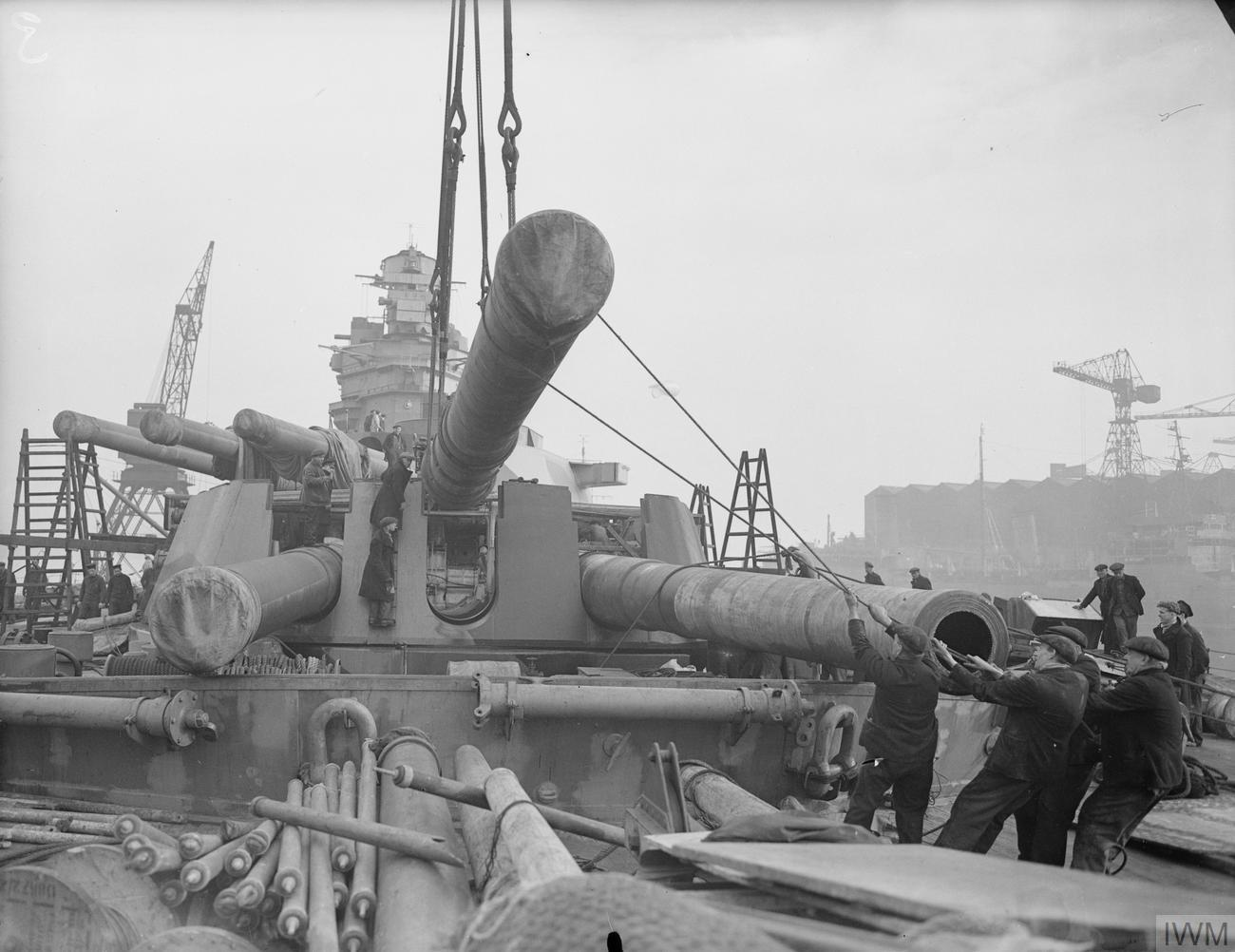
Installing a 16-inch gun in 'A' turret, February 1942

The main battery of the Nelson-class ships consisted of nine breech-loading (BL) 16-inch (406 mm) guns in three triple-gun turrets forward of the superstructure. Designated 'A', 'B' and 'X' from front to rear, 'B' turret superfired over the others. Their secondary armament consisted of a dozen BL 6-inch (152 mm) Mk XXII guns in twin-gun turrets aft of the superstructure, three turrets on each broadside. Their anti-aircraft (AA) armament consisted of six quick-firing (QF) 4.7-inch (120 mm) Mk VIII guns in unshielded single mounts and eight QF 2-pounder (40-millimetre (1.6 in)) guns in single mounts. The ships were fitted with two submerged 24.5-inch (622 mm) torpedo tubes, one on each broadside, angled 10° off the centreline.

The Nelsons were built with two fire-control directors fitted with 15-foot (4.6 m) rangefinders. One was mounted above the bridge and the other was at the aft end of the superstructure. Each turret was also fitted with a 41-foot (12.5 m) rangefinder. The secondary armament was controlled by four directors equipped with 12-foot (3.7 m) rangefinders. One pair were mounted on each side of the main director on the bridge roof and the others were abreast the aft main director. The anti-aircraft directors were situated on a tower abaft the main-armament director with a 12-foot high-angle rangefinder in the middle of the tower. A pair of torpedo-control directors with 15-foot rangefinders were positioned abreast the funnel.

=== Protection ===
The ships' waterline belt consisted of Krupp cemented armour (KC) that was 14 inches (356 mm) thick between the main gun barbettes and thinned to 13 inches (330 mm) over the engine and boiler rooms as well as the six-inch magazines, but did not reach either the bow or the stern. To improve its ability to deflect plunging fire, its upper edge was inclined 18° outward. The ends of the armoured citadel were closed off by transverse bulkheads of non-cemented armour 8 and 12 inches (203 and 305 mm) thick at the forward end and 4 and 10 inches (102 and 254 mm) thick at the aft end. The faces of the main-gun turrets were protected by 16-inch of KC armour while the turret sides were 9 to 11 inches (229 to 279 mm) thick and the roof armour plates measured 7.25 inches (184 mm) in thickness.

The KC armour of the barbettes ranged in thickness from 12 to 15 inches (305 to 381 mm). The top of the armoured citadel of the Nelson-class ships was protected by an armoured deck that rested on the top of the belt armour. Its non-cemented armour plates ranged in thickness from 6.25 inches (159 mm) over the main-gun magazines to 3.75 inches (95 mm) over the propulsion machinery spaces and the secondary magazines. Aft of the citadel was an armoured deck 4.25 inches (108 mm) thick at the level of the lower edge of the belt armour that extended almost to the end of the stern to cover the steering gear. The conning tower's KC armour was 12 to 14 inches (305 to 356 mm) thick with a 6.5-inch (170 mm) roof. The secondary-gun turrets were protected by 1–1.5 inches (25–38 mm) of non-cemented armour. Underwater protection for the Nelsons was provided by a double bottom 5 feet (1.5 m) deep and a torpedo protection system. It consisted of an empty outer watertight compartment and an inner water-filled compartment. They had a total depth of 12 feet (3.7 m) and were backed by a torpedo bulkhead 1.5 inches thick.

=== Design deficiencies ===
The Nelson class was an innovative design, but limited by the constraints of the Washington Naval Treaty. The decision to use 16-inch guns combined with the 35,000-ton displacement limit made saving weight the primary concern of designers. The Director of Naval Construction, Eustace Tennyson d'Eyncourt, informed the ship's designer, Edward Attwood, "In order to keep the displacement to 35,000 tons, everything is to be cut down to a minimum." The emphasis on saving weight resulted in deficiencies which affected the performance of Rodney during the Second World War. The design compromises had less negative consequences for Nelson because that ship underwent a number of refits immediately before and during the war. Naval architect and historian David K. Brown stated, "It seems likely that in the quest for weight saving, the structure was not quite strong enough." Unlike Nelson, which exceeded the design specification for machinery weight, the lighter machinery of Rodney resulted in chronic problems. The ship's endurance declined substantially in the decade after her launch; in her 1941 action against Bismarck, Rodney was nearly forced to abandon the pursuit because of a lack of fuel. British designers cited the poor endurance of the ship when establishing the endurance requirements for the battleship Vanguard. Throughout the war Rodney was plagued with leaks as a result of panting, and the ship required repairs because of serious leaks in 1940, 1941 and 1944. During one storm, the leaking was severe enough to overwhelm a 50-ton pump. Leaks, defective riveting, and other problems continued to affect Rodney even after a 1941 refit in Boston, Massachusetts. By 1943 officials concluded that she required a complete modernization to extend her service life. The ship never received the necessary upgrades and as a result was unfit for service by the end of 1944.

=== Modifications ===
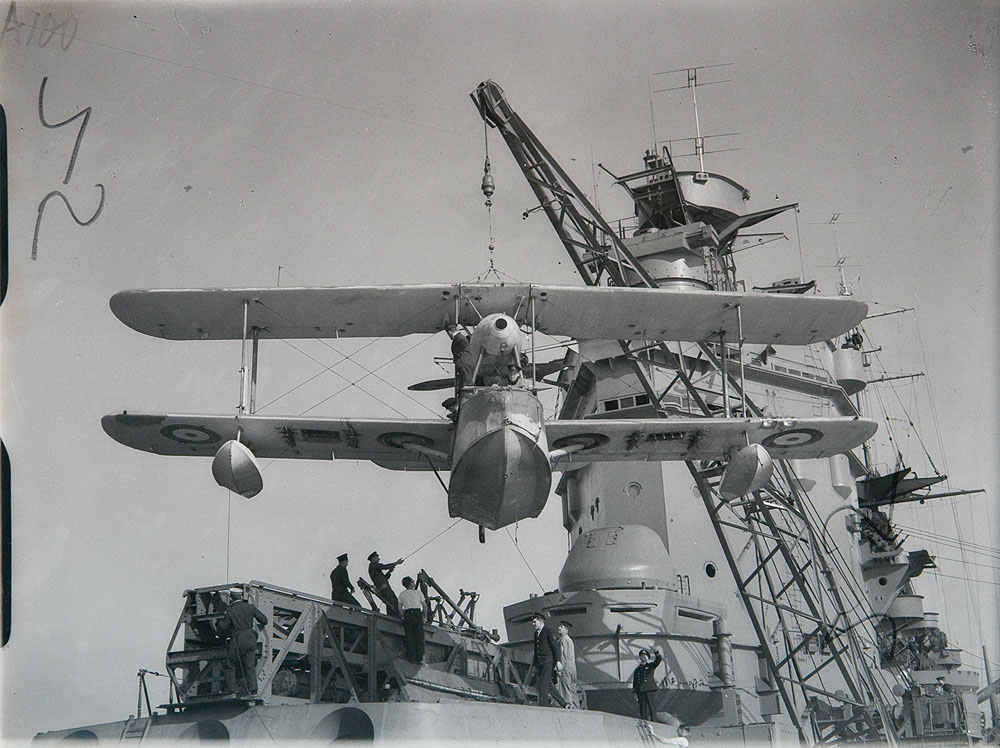
Hoisting a Walrus amphibian aboard

The high-angle directors and rangefinder and their platform were replaced by a new circular platform for the High Angle Control System (HACS) Mk I director by March 1930. By July 1932, the single two-pounder guns and the starboard torpedo director were removed and replaced by a single octuple two-pounder "pom-pom" mount on the starboard side of the funnel and a 9-foot (2.7 m) rangefinder was added at the rear of the bridge roof. The port side mount was installed several years later in the position occupied by the port torpedo director and anti-aircraft directors for both mounts were added to the bridge structure. In 1934–1935, Rodney was fitted with a pair of quadruple mounts for Vickers 0.5 in (12.7 mm) AA machineguns that were positioned on the forward superstructure. The ship was fitted with an aircraft catapult on the roof of 'X' turret and a collapsible crane abreast the bridge was also added in 1937 to hoist the aircraft in and out of the water. A floatplane version of the Fairey Swordfish torpedo bomber was first used aboard, but it was soon replaced by a Supermarine Walrus amphibian. In October 1938 another octuple "pom-pom" mount was added on the quarterdeck and a prototype Type 79Y early-warning radar system was installed on Rodney's masthead. She was the first battleship to be so equipped.

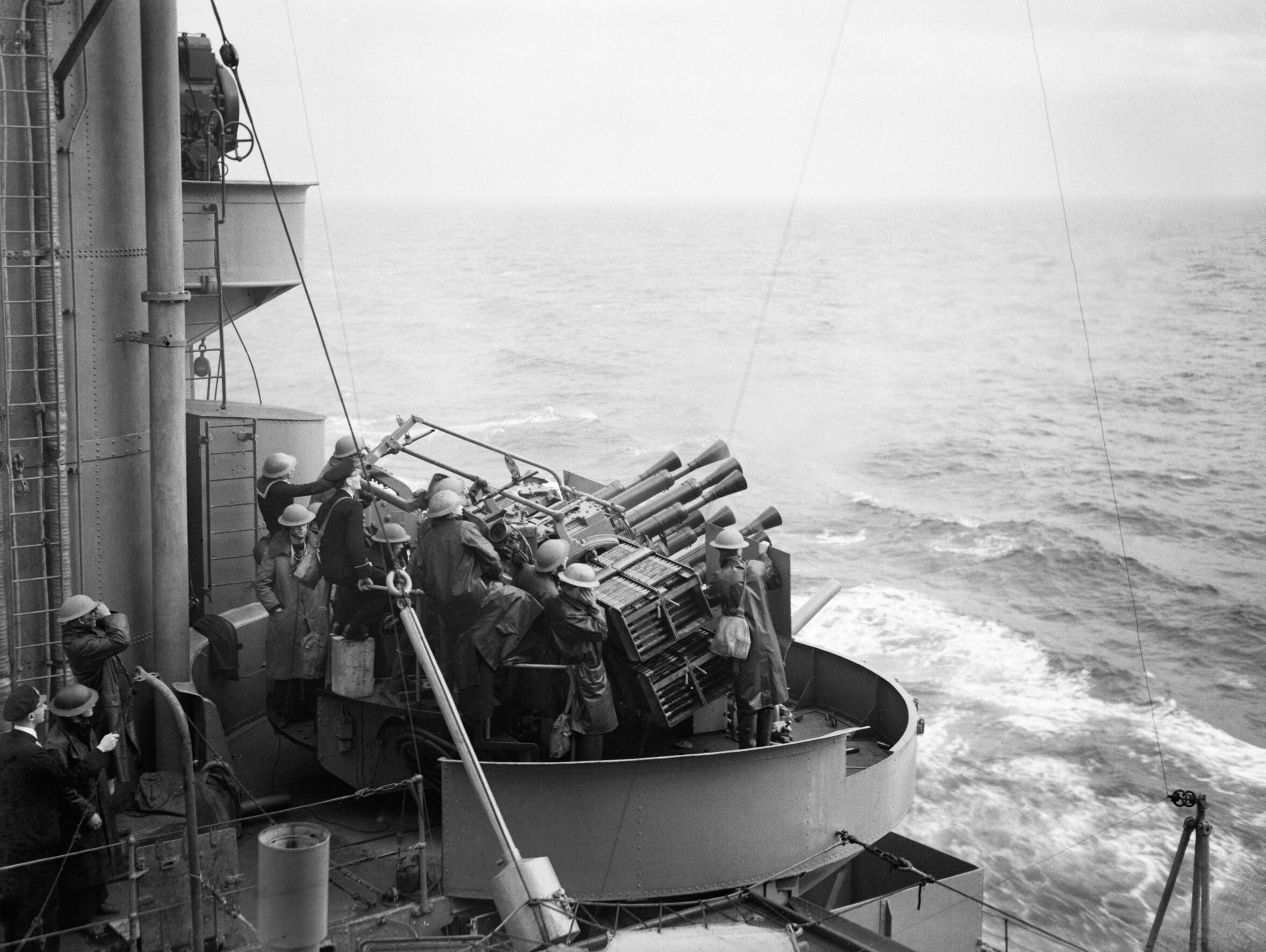
Octuple '"pom-pom" gunnery training, October 1940

During a brief refit in HM Dockyard, Rosyth, Scotland, from 24 August to 10 September 1940, the Type 79Y radar was upgraded to a Type 279 system and two 20-millimetre (0.8 in) Oerlikon light AA guns were installed on the roof of 'B' turret. While Rodney was refitting in the Boston Navy Yard in the United States in June–August 1941, the Oerlikons were replaced by a quadruple two-pounder mount and a pair of octuple two-pounder mounts were fitted in lieu of the aft six-inch gunnery directors. In addition a full suite of radars were added. A Type 281 radar replaced the Type 279, a Type 271 surface-search radar was installed as was a Type 284 gunnery radar on the roof of the forward main-gun director. The ship's light AA armament was heavily reinforced during a refit in February–May 1942 with seventeen 20 mm Oerlikons in single mounts added to turret roofs, the superstructure and the decks. The quadruple 0.5-inch mounts were replaced with Mk III "pom-pom" directors and three additional Mk IIIs were installed to control the aft octuple two-pounder mounts, all of which were fitted with Type 282 fire-control radars. The HACS Mk I was replaced by a Mk III director and four barrage (anti-aircraft) directors with Type 283 radars were added for the main guns. In addition her radar suite was upgraded: the Type 271 radar was replaced by a Type 273 system, a Type 291 early-warning radar was added and a Type 285 fire-control radar was installed on the roof of the HACS director.

While under repair at Rosyth in August–September, four additional Oerlikons were added on the quarterdeck. In May 1943 gun shields were added to the 4.7-inch guns and the catapult on the roof of 'X' turret was removed. (Note: Naval historian Iain Ballantyne states that this was not removed until her early 1944 refit.) Many more Oerlikons were installed during this brief refit, specifically 36 more single mounts and 5 twin mounts, which gave Rodney a total of 67 weapons in 57 single and 5 twin mounts. In preparation for her role providing naval gunfire support during the Normandy landings, two more Oerlikons were added as was a Type 650 radio jammer in January–March 1944. These additions increased the ship's deep displacement to 43,100 long tons (43,800 t) and her crew to 1,631–1,650 men.

== Construction and career ==
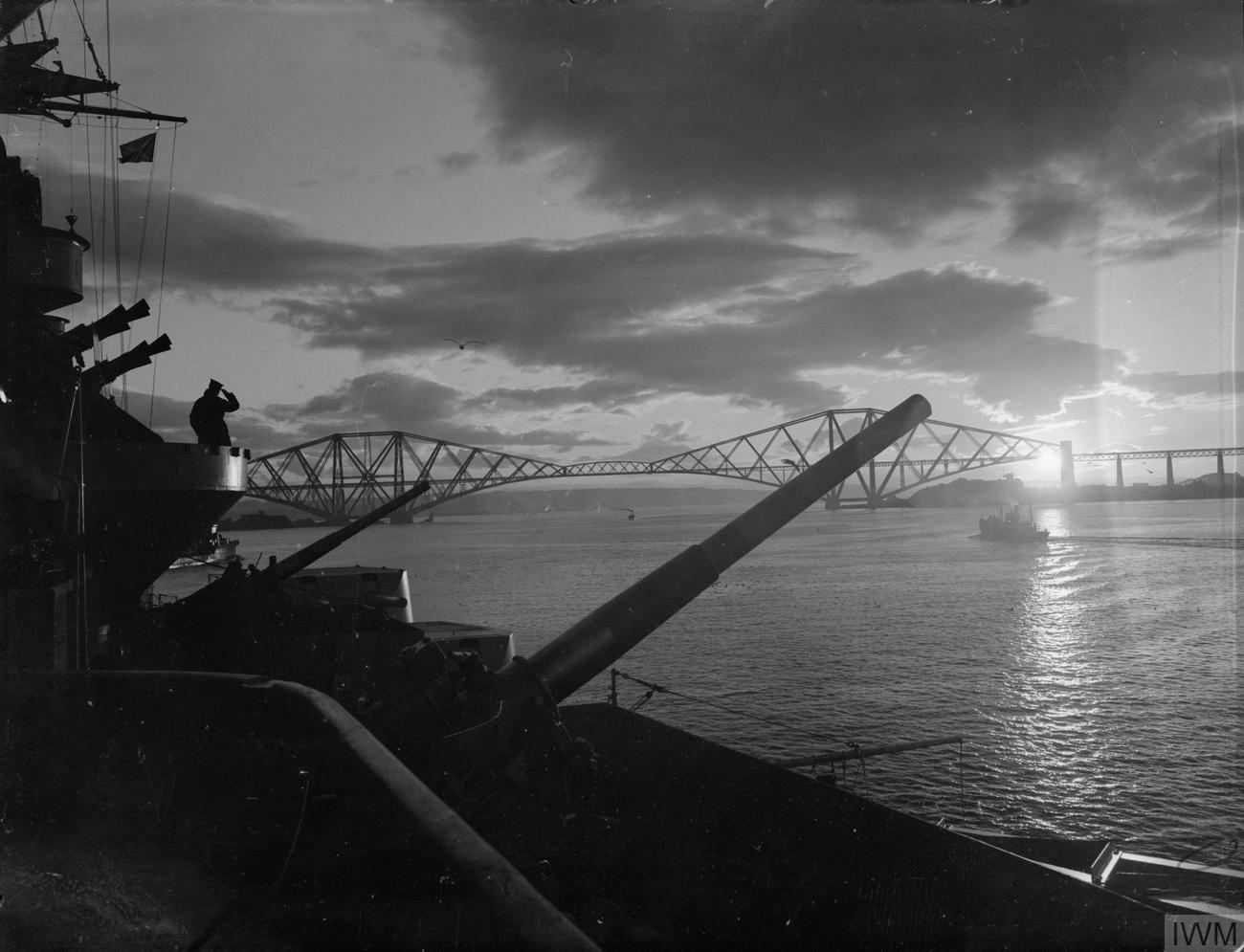
Sunset aboard Rodney in the Firth of Forth, October 1940

Rodney, named for Admiral Lord George Rodney, was the sixth ship of her name to serve in the Royal Navy. Given the yard number 904, she was laid down on 28 December 1922 as part of the 1922 Naval Programme at Cammell Laird's shipyard in Birkenhead and was launched on 17 December 1925 by Princess Mary, Viscountess Lascelles, after three attempts at cracking the bottle of Imperial Burgundy. She was completed and her trials began in August 1927 and she was commissioned on 7 December under the command of Captain Henry Kitson. The ship cost £7,617,799. The Nelson-class ships received several nicknames: Rodnol and Nelsol after the Royal Fleet Auxiliary oil tankers with a prominent amidships superstructure and names ending in "ol", The Queen's Mansions after a resemblance between her superstructure and the Queen Anne's Mansions block of flats, the pair of boots, the ugly sisters and the Cherry Tree class as they were cut-down by the Washington Naval Treaty. Rodney's trials resumed after she was formally commissioned and continued until she entered service on 28 March 1928. The ship was assigned to the 2nd Battle Squadron of the Atlantic Fleet (renamed as Home Fleet in March 1932) and remained so, aside from refits or repairs, until 1941. On 21 April, Kitson was relieved by Captain Francis Tottenham. The following month she headed north to Invergordon, Scotland, to join the rest of the Atlantic Fleet in the annual exercises. Rodney returned to the south in August, where she was the Royal Guardship during Cowes Week where the ship hosted King George V and Queen Mary on 11 August. The battleship then sailed to HM Dockyard, Devonport, to participate in a charity fund-raising Navy Week which saw 67,000 visitors come to the dockyard. Rodney had some work done on her hull in Glasgow's Gladstone Dock in early October.

At the beginning of 1929, the Atlantic and Mediterranean Fleets combined for their annual fleet manoeuvres in the Mediterranean Sea. While visiting Torquay, Devon, for a fleet rendezvous in July, Rodney was ordered to go to the assistance of two submarines that had collided off Milford Haven, Wales, on 9 July. Ordered to steam at full speed, the ship arrived at Pembroke Dock the following morning to load rescue and salvage equipment. Delayed for a day by weather too bad for diving, she arrived at the site the following evening but it was too late for any survivors of H47 and Rodney set sail for HM Dockyard, Portsmouth. The ship's propulsion machinery was proving troublesome by this time and she was docked there in late September for a refit that took the rest of the year. Captain Andrew Cunningham, later First Sea Lord, relieved Tottenham on 15 December.

Aside from the usual schedule of exercises, 1930 saw Rodney visit Portrush, Northern Ireland in June, which named a street after the battleship and a voyage to Iceland to commemorate the thousandth year of the Icelandic Parliament. Cunningham was relieved by Captain Roger Bellairs on 16 December. In mid-September 1931, the crew of Rodney took part in the Invergordon Mutiny when they refused orders to go to sea for an exercise, although they relented after several days when the Admiralty reduced the severity of the pay cuts that prompted the mutiny. Unhappy with how Bellairs had handled the crew during the mutiny, the Admiralty ordered that he was to be relieved by Captain John Tovey on 12 April 1932.

After Nelson ran aground while leaving Portsmouth in January 1934, Rodney became the temporary fleet flagship when Admiral Lord William Boyle, commander of the Home Fleet, hoisted his flag aboard her for the winter cruise to the British West Indies. The fleet visited two Norwegian ports before returning home. Captain Wilfred Custance relieved Tovey on 31 August. The 1935 winter cruise saw the ship return to the West Indies, before visiting the Azores and then Gibraltar between 15 January and 17 March. The ship participated in King George V's Silver Jubilee Fleet Review at Spithead on 16 July and then again served as the Royal Guardship during Cowes Week. Captain William Whitworth replaced Custance on 21 February 1936 and he was relieved in his turn by Captain Ronald Halifax on 25 July.

Some of Rodney's crew travelled to London to participate in King George VI's Coronation on 12 May 1937 and the ship took part in the Fleet Review at Spithead on 20 May. She again became the temporary fleet flagship when Nelson began a lengthy refit the following month and Admiral Sir Roger Backhouse hoisted his flag aboard her. Rodney visited Oslo, Norway, in July. Nelson's refit ended in February 1938 and the sisters made a port visit to Lisbon, Portugal that same month. Captain Edward Syfret relieved Whitworth on 16 August, shortly before Rodney began her annual short refit in September. After the completion of her post-refit trials in January 1939, Rear-Admiral Lancelot Holland hoisted his flag aboard the ship as the commander of the 2nd Battle Squadron. She fired a 21-gun salute in honour of the French President Albert Lebrun's arrival in Dover in March for talks with the British government. As the Home Fleet was assembling in Scapa Flow when tensions with Germany rose in August, Rodney developed steering problems and had to proceed to Rosyth for repairs and a bottom cleaning.

=== Second World War ===
==== 1939 ====
When Great Britain declared war on Nazi Germany on 3 September 1939, Rodney and the bulk of the Home Fleet were patrolling the waters between Iceland, Norway and Scotland for German blockade runners and then did much the same off the Norwegian coast from 6 to 10 September. The Home Fleet was already at sea when the submarine Spearfish, on patrol in the Heligoland Bight, was badly damaged by German depth charges on 24 September. Unable to submerge, she requested assistance and the fleet responded with two destroyers escorting her home and the balance of the fleet providing cover. The Germans spotted the bulk of the Home Fleet and it was attacked by five bombers from the first group of Bomber Wing 30 (I./KG 30). Rodney's radar provided timely warning and the aircraft inflicted no damage on the British ships. The following month the ship was part of the covering force for an iron ore convoy from Narvik, Norway.

Syfret was relieved by Captain Frederick Dalrymple-Hamilton on 21 November. Following the sinking of the armed merchant cruiser Rawalpindi two days later by the German battleships Scharnhorst and Gneisenau off Iceland, Rodney and the rest of the Home Fleet were sent to look for them but heavy weather allowed the German battleships to evade their pursuers and return to Germany. The battleship developed serious problems with her rudder on 29 November and was forced to return to Liverpool, steering only with her engines, for repairs that lasted until 31 December.

==== 1940 ====
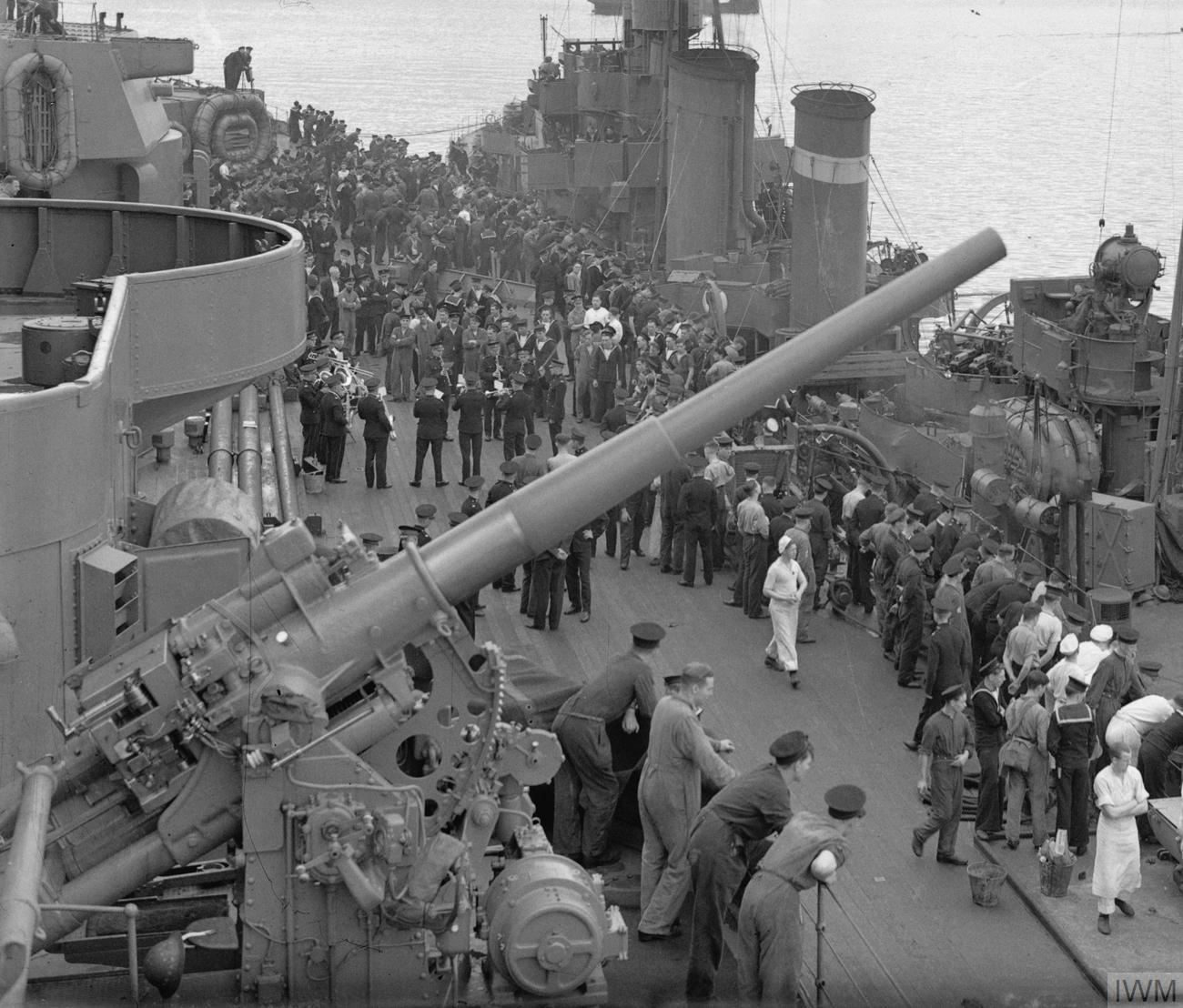
The destroyer Punjabi berthed alongside Rodney, 1940. A QF 4.7-inch Mk VIII AA gun is in the foreground.

With Nelson damaged by a mine on 4 December, Rodney served as the temporary fleet flagship until her sister's return in August. She mostly spent January and February 1940 at anchor with occasional missions to provide cover from commerce raiders for convoys. During one such sortie on 21 February in heavy weather, her steering problems resurfaced and forced her return to Greenock, Scotland. Six days later, the ship was visited by King George VI and Queen Elizabeth during their morale-boosting tour of Scottish shipyards. The First Lord of the Admiralty Winston Churchill (soon to become Prime Minister) boarded Rodney for a voyage to Scapa Flow on 7 to 8 March. Despite the danger of aerial attack by the Luftwaffe, most of the Home Fleet was now based there; Rodney was near-missed during an attack on 16 March.

Receiving word that the Royal Air Force (RAF) had attacked north-bound German warships in the North Sea on 7 April, Admiral Sir Charles Forbes, Commander-in-chief Home Fleet, ordered most of his ships to put to sea that evening. Rodney was hit by a 500-kilogram (1,102 lb) bomb on 9 April off the south-western coast of Norway. The bomb broke up after hitting the corner of an armoured 4.7-inch ready ammunition box on the upper deck aft of the funnel; its fragments penetrated through several decks before bouncing off the four-inch armoured deck and started a small fire in the galley. Three men were wounded by the bomb and another fifteen suffered electrical burns when water being used to fight the fire poured onto a junction box. The crew made temporary repairs and the ship remained at sea until she dropped anchor at Scapa Flow on 17 April. Upon receiving notice that German ships had been spotted in the Norwegian Sea on 9 June, Forbes ordered the Home Fleet, including Rodney, to sea to protect troop convoys evacuating Allied forces from Norway.

Nelson returned from the dockyard on 24 July and resumed her role as the Home Fleet flagship. Rodney was transferred from Scapa Flow to Rosyth on 23 August with orders to attack the German invasion fleet in the English Channel when Operation Sealion began. She returned to Scapa on 4 November to begin convoy escort duty. After the armed merchant cruiser Jervis Bay was sunk the following day by the heavy cruiser Admiral Scheer, the sisters were deployed to the Iceland–Faeroes gap to block any attempts by the German cruiser to return home. The following month Rodney was detailed to rendezvous with Convoy HX 93 from Halifax, Nova Scotia, and escort it home. The ship encountered a strong storm with gale-force winds from 6 to 8 December that caused leaks in her hull plating with a moderate amount of flooding. Repairs at Rosyth began on 18 December that included structural reinforcement of the hull plating and general reinforcement of the forward hull structure.

==== 1941 ====
After finishing her refit on 13 January 1941, Rodney joined the hunt for Scharnhorst and Gneisenau, without success and then escorted Convoy HX 108 from 12 to 23 February. On 16 March, the ship spotted the latter battleship while escorting Convoy HX 114 in the North Atlantic; Gneisenau was rescuing survivors from the independently steaming 1,831-gross register ton (GRT) reefer ship, Chilean Reefer, when Rodney steamed over the horizon, silhouetted against the setting sun. Partially hidden behind the burning merchant ship, the gunnery officer estimated that the intermittently visible German ship was 15 or 16 nmi (28 or 30 km; 17 or 18 mi) away, close to maximum range for Rodney's guns. Dalyrmple-Hamilton declined to pursue Gneisenau when she turned away at her top speed of 31 knots (57 km/h; 36 mph) and was able to rescue 27 survivors and 2 dead seamen from one lifeboat before returning to her convoy. Troop Convoy TC 10 departed Halifax on 10 April with a strong escort that included Rodney. While steaming south out of the River Clyde in the early hours of 19 April, the battleship accidentally rammed and sank the armed trawler Topaze; only four survivors could be rescued by nearby destroyers (other sources state two survivors or no survivors)

==== Bismarck ====
On 22 May 1941, Rodney and four destroyers were part of the escort for the ocean liner MV Britannic as she set sail for Halifax. The battleship was scheduled to continue onward to Boston for repairs and a refit. To this end, the ship carried some of the materials, such as boiler tubes and three octuple "pom-pom" mounts intended for use in her refit. She also carried 521 military passengers bound for Halifax, as well as an American assistant naval attaché conveying important documents back to the United States. On board the ship were also gold bullion from the Bank of England reserves for safekeeping in Canada.

After Bismarck sank the battlecruiser Hood during the Battle of Denmark Strait on the morning of 24 May, Rodney was ordered by the Admiralty to join in the pursuit of the German ship, leaving the destroyer Eskimo to escort Britannic and taking Somali, Mashona and Tartar with her in the search. After the heavy cruiser Suffolk radioed that she had lost radar contact with the Bismarck at 04:01 on the morning of 25 May, Dalrymple-Hamilton, after consulting his senior officers and the American attaché, decided that the German ship was probably heading for Brest and so set course to the east to head her off, at some stages reaching twenty-five knots, which exceeded her designed maximum speed by two knots (3.7 km/h; 2.3 mph), although this caused several mechanical failures Later that morning, Admiral Sir John Tovey in the battleship King George V ordered all ships to head north west due to a misinterpreted signal from the Admiralty but Dalrymple-Hamilton knew that his ship was too slow to catch up to Bismarck if she was headed in that direction and disregarded Tovey's order. The Admiralty informed Dalrymple-Hamilton that they believed that Bismarck was probably headed to Brest or Saint Nazaire at 11:40. The captain subsequently altered course further south east to cover the approaches to Spanish ports where the German ship might intern herself but this was countermanded by an Admiralty order to turn north east at 14:30. Dalrymple-Hamilton continued south east for several more hours before he decided to obey the order at 16:20; during this time Bismarck passed his position just under the horizon, about 25 nmi (46 km; 29 mi) away. Not having spotted the German ship by 21:00, Dalrymple-Hamilton decided to turn south-east again, heading directly for Brest.

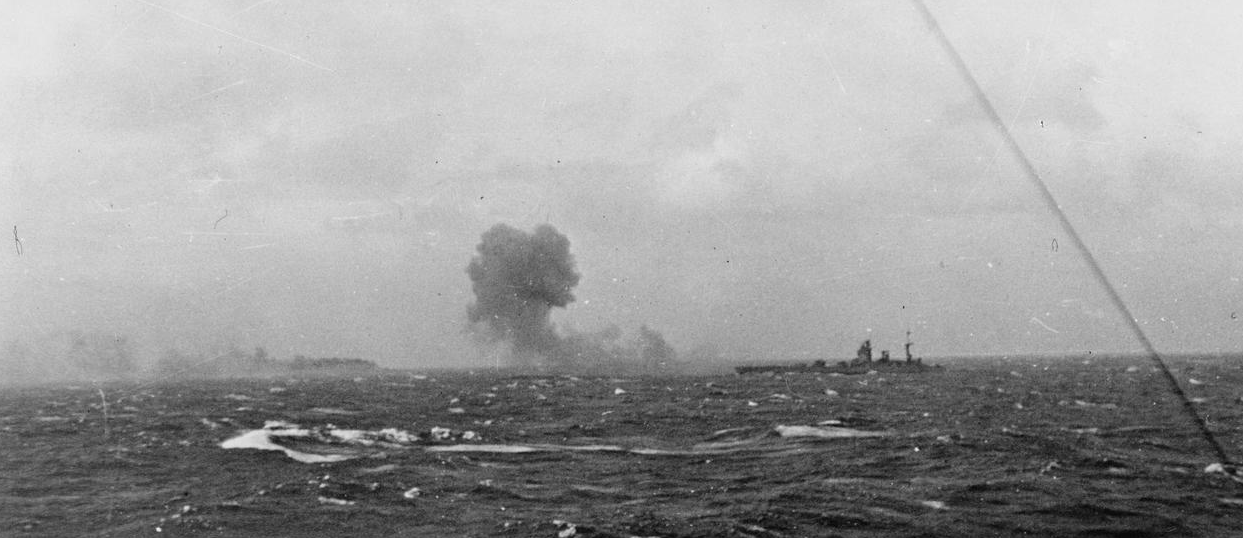
Rodney firing on Bismarck, which can be seen burning in the distance

Bismarck was spotted by a RAF Consolidated PBY Catalina flying boat at 10:35 on 26 May and the two battleships were able to join up as Tovey had realised his mistake and doubled back. Despite the heavy weather, the aircraft carrier Ark Royal launched her first attack, by 14 Swordfish torpedo bombers, against the German ship that afternoon. The pilots mistook the light cruiser Sheffield for the Bismarck and attacked, although the cruiser was able to evade the six of eleven torpedoes dropped that did not detonate when they hit the sea due to faulty magnetic detonators. Around dusk, Ark Royal launched an attack by 15 Swordfish, whose torpedoes had been fitted with contact detonators. Despite the heavy anti-aircraft fire, the Swordfish hit Bismarck with three torpedoes. Two of them struck forward of the aft gun turrets and caused no significant damage; the last struck the stern, disabled the battleship's steering and caused her to significantly reduce speed. That evening Tovey detached Mashona and Somali to refuel and had Rodney fall in behind King George V for the battle against Bismarck. Although his ships could catch the German ship that night now that her steering had been disabled and her engines damaged, Tovey decided to reduce speed to save fuel and wait until dawn to allow his ships the maximum amount of time in which to sink the German ship.

Rodney spotted Bismarck at 08:44 on 27 May, one minute after King George V, and was the first to open fire at a range of 23,400 yd (21,400 m) three minutes later, with Bismarck replying at 08:49. The initial salvos from both ships were off but Rodney straddled her opponent with her third salvo and hit her twice with her fourth at 09:02, knocking out the forward superfiring turret, disabling the lower turret, and severely damaging her bridge. In her turn, Bismarck scored no hits, although she managed to damage Rodney with shell splinters before her forward guns were knocked out. As the British ship manoeuvred to bring 'X' turret to bear while closing the distance, she exposed herself to fire from Bismarck's aft turrets, which only managed to straddle Rodney. As the range diminished, she began to fire torpedoes, although shock waves from near misses caused the door for her starboard tube to jam at 09:23. At 09:31, the ship blew off the left barrel of the Bismarck's lower aft gun turret and started a fire inside the turret that forced its evacuation. Around this time the combined fire from Rodney, King George V and the heavy cruisers Norfolk and Dorsetshire knocked out all of Bismarck's main guns. Rodney closed to point-blank range and continued to engage, starting to fire full broadsides into Bismarck on a virtually flat trajectory, and added three more torpedoes at a range of 3,000 yd (2,700 m) beginning at 09:51; one of these malfunctioned but another may have struck Bismarck. According to the naval historian Ludovic Kennedy, who was present at the battle in Tartar, "if true, [this is] the only instance in history of one battleship torpedoing another."

Rodney fired 378 sixteen-inch shells and 706 six-inch shells during the battle before Dalrymple-Hamilton ordered cease fire around 10:16, while Dorsetshire was then ordered to finish Bismarck off with torpedoes. Ironically, Rodney's own main guns firing at low elevation had damaged her more extensively than had Bismarck. Deck plates around the main-gun turrets had been depressed by the effects of the guns' muzzle blast, and some of the structural members supporting them had cracked or buckled. Piping, urinals and water mains had broken, while the shock of firing had loosened rivets and bolts in the hull plating, flooding various compartments. One gun in 'A' turret permanently broke down during the battle and two others in 'B' turret were temporarily disabled.

Rodney and King George V, running short on fuel, were ordered home and were ineffectually attacked by a pair of Luftwaffe bombers the next day. Rodney arrived at Greenock to replenish her ammunition, fuel and supplies on 29 May and departed for Halifax on 4 June together with the ocean liner Windsor Castle, escorted by four destroyers. She continued to the Boston Navy Yard for the delayed repairs to her propulsion machinery and her self-inflicted damage from the battle where she arrived on 12 June. Since the repairs took several months to complete, Rodney's crew was furloughed to local Civilian Conservation Corps camps for a fortnight. During the refit, Dalrymple-Hamilton was relieved by Captain James Rivett-Carnac and Rodney departed Boston for Bermuda on 20 August to work up. The ship arrived in Gibraltar on 24 September to join Force H.

==== Force H and subsequent operations ====
Rodney departed Gibraltar later that day to join her sister in escorting a convoy to Malta in Operation Halberd. During the operation the ship accidentally shot down a Fleet Air Arm Fairey Fulmar fighter and Nelson was torpedoed. She was initially able to keep up with the convoy, but had to turn back on 28 September 1941, followed shortly afterwards by Rodney and Prince of Wales. With Nelson forced to return home for repairs, Vice-Admiral James Somerville transferred his flag to Rodney on 30 September. The ship's tenure with Force H was brief, with her only mission escorting two carriers flying off fighters for Malta from 16 to 19 October. On 30 October, she was ordered to return home to replace the departing Prince of Wales in the Home Fleet in case the battleship Tirpitz attempted to break out into the North Atlantic.

Departing on 2 November, she arrived at Loch Ewe, Scotland, six days later, but only remained there for a few hours to off-load her passengers and re-provision before departing for Hvalfjord, Iceland, where she arrived on 12 November. The highlight of Rodney's initial stay in Iceland was a visit by the movie star, Douglas Fairbanks, Jr., who was also stationed there aboard an American battleship. The ship was transferred to Scapa Flow in late December, but was ordered back to Hvalfjord in mid-January 1942 where she was briefly used as a target ship for United States Army Air Force aviators.

==== 1942 ====
Rodney was ordered to proceed to Birkenhead for a refit on 10 February and then sailed to Liverpool, where she remained until 5 May, when the ship was ordered to return to Scapa to begin working up with Nelson. The sisters began escorting Convoy WS 19, loaded with troops bound for Egypt or Burma, on 4 June. They continued as far south as the coast of Portuguese Angola before turning back on 26 June. The following day, Rodney's steering began malfunctioning despite repair attempts. The sisters reached Freetown, Sierra Leone, on 1 July where the ship docked for repairs. Departing on 17 July, the sisters headed home, although Rodney's steering problems soon resurfaced. The ship arrived at Scapa on 26 July where she began cleaning her boilers and requested assistance from Rosyth Dockyard to fix her steering gear.

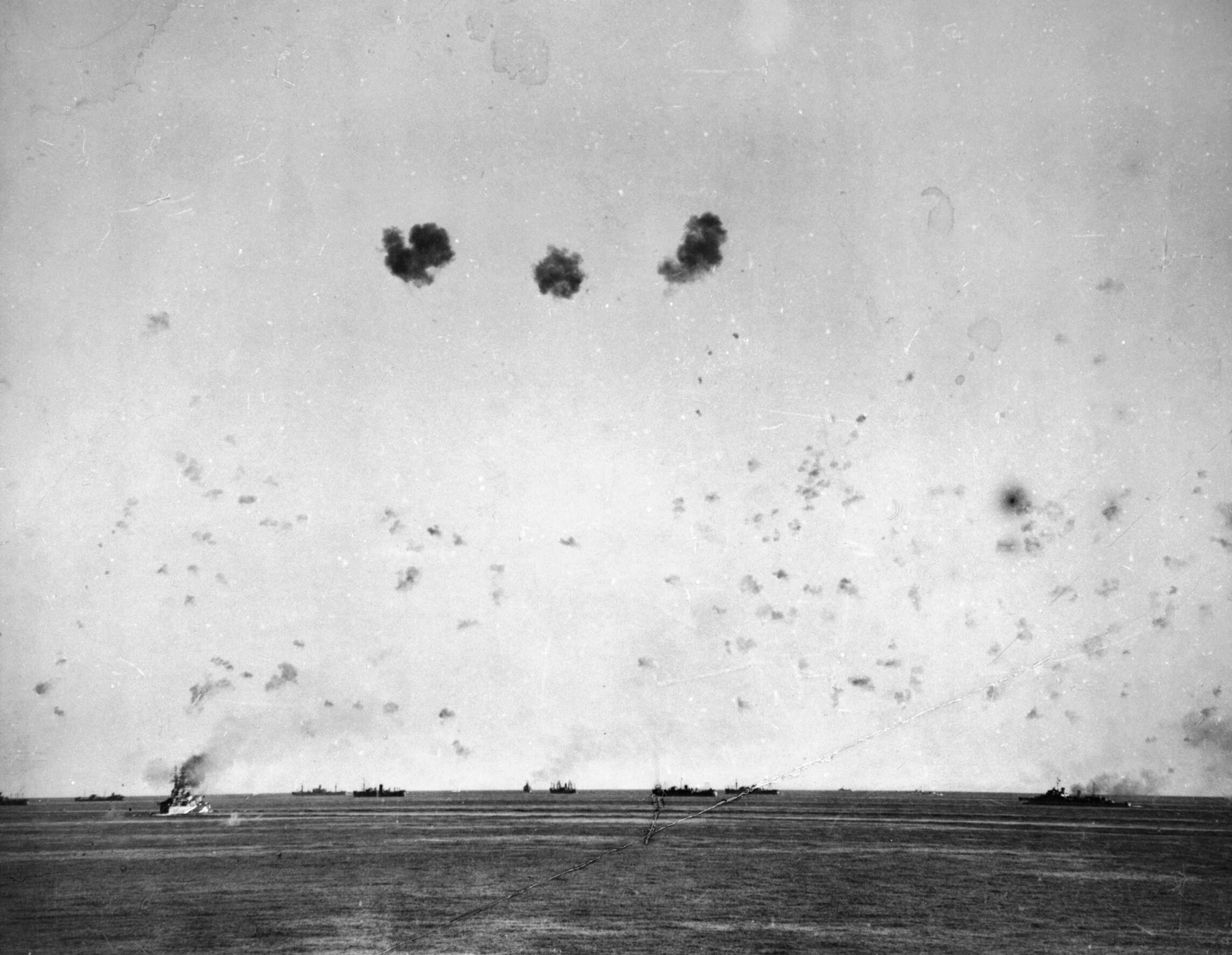
The convoy under aerial attack, 11 August; Rodney is at the left

She departed Scapa on 2 August with orders for convoy escort duties, but was soon diverted to become part of the close escort for Convoy WS 21S, bound for Malta as part of Operation Pedestal. Vice-Admiral Sir Bruce Fraser, second-in-command of the Home Fleet, was aboard the ship to gain experience in integrating carrier and convoy operations and was not flying his flag. Rodney rendezvoused with the convoy two days later and was assigned to Force Z which would turn back before the convoy passed through the Sicilian Narrows. Italian spies in Algeciras, Francoist Spain, spotted the convoy as it passed through the Strait of Gibraltar on 10 August and Italian reconnaissance aircraft located it the following morning. The German submarine U-73 opened what would be many Axis attacks on the convoy and its escorts, by sinking the carrier Eagle that afternoon. Later that evening, the battleship was attacked by two bombers that near missed with two bombs and a torpedo. The ship was able to comb the tracks between two torpedoes dropped by Italian aircraft at 07:45 on 12 August. Her gunners claimed an Italian bomber at 12:17.

Twenty minutes later, Rodney opened fire with her main guns on a wave of approaching Italian torpedo bombers, hoping to knock some of them down with shell splashes, which "frightened us, our escort and [the] Italians". The ship was near missed many times that afternoon and her steering gear began acting up around 14:00, but the engineers were able to keep it semi-operational. At 18:42, Rodney was attacked by Junkers Ju 87 "Stuka" dive bombers flown by the Regia Aeronautica's 102nd Dive Bomber Group. Although the ship shot down one of her attackers, one armour-piecing bomb bounced off the roof of 'X' turret, wounding four Royal Marines manning the Oerlikons there, and two others detonated nearby as the ship was trying to evade the bombs. The evasive manoeuvres worsened Rodney's steering problems and issues with her boilers began after Force Z turned back that evening which limited the ship to 18 knots (33 km/h; 21 mph). They arrived at Gibraltar on 14 August and temporary repairs were made. Rodney departed Gibraltar to rejoin the Home Fleet at Scapa two days later, but her problems worsened during the voyage as heavy weather further stressed the steering motors and exacerbated her many leaks. The ship was sent to Rosyth for repairs on 22 August.

With her repairs completed on 16 September, Rodney arrived back at Scapa on 23 September but almost immediately set sail for Loch Cairnbawn where the British had created a replica of the defences around Tirpitz. The battleship was to serve as a target for frogmen training to use Chariot manned torpedoes to deliver and attach limpet mines to her hull in preparation for Operation Title. Rodney returned to Scapa on 29 September where she spent most of October training in preparation for the invasion of Northwest Africa scheduled for the following month. Churchill visited the ship on 10 October and thanked the crew for their efforts during Pedestal. Rodney set sail for Gibraltar on 23 October and rejoined Force H upon her arrival.

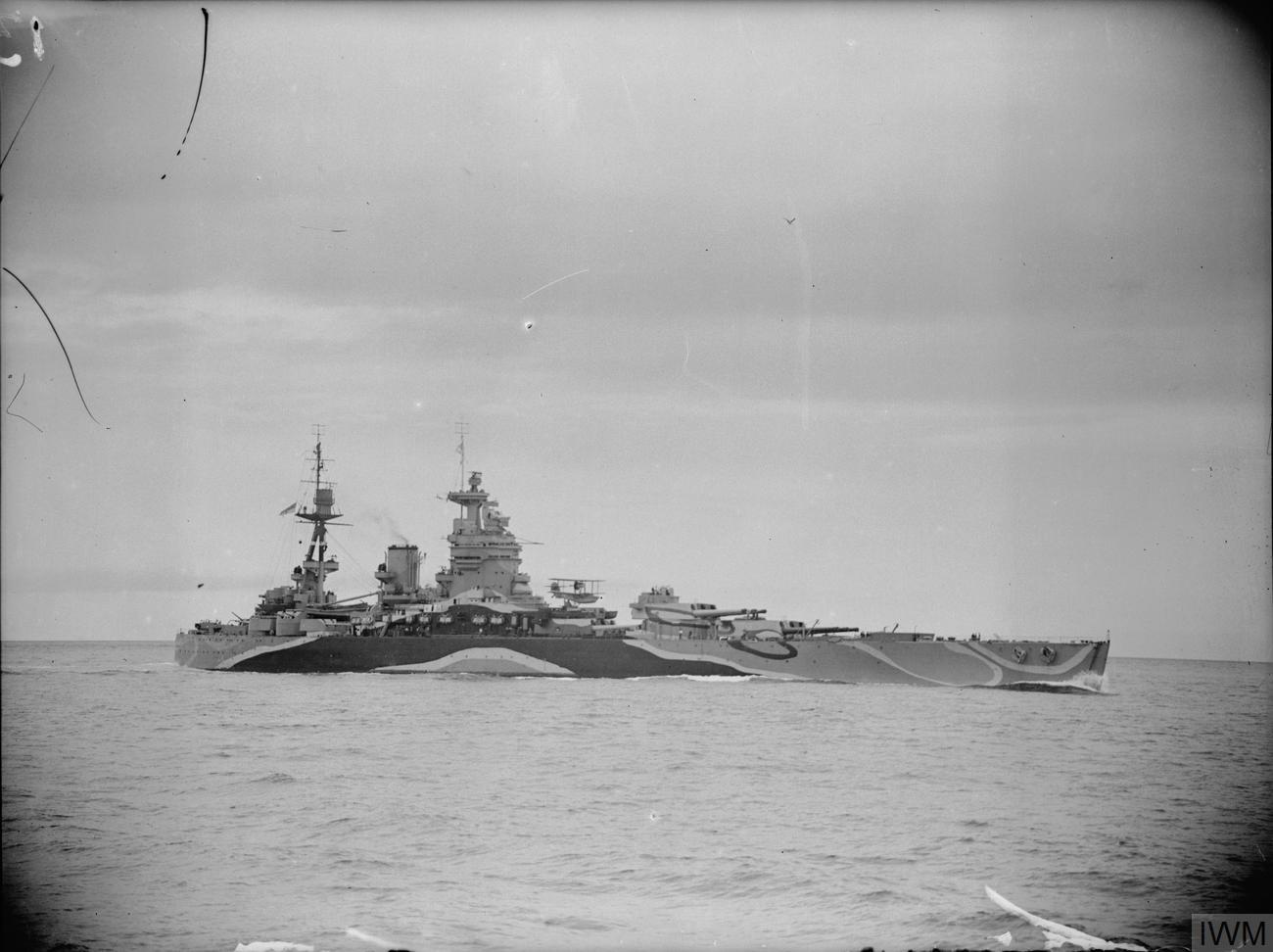
Rodney off Mers-el-Kebir, November 1942

Force H was to provide distant cover for the landings at Algiers and Oran, French Algeria, in case either the Vichy French Navy or the Regia Marina (Royal Italian Navy) attempted to intervene. If that did not happen, Rodney was to support the Centre Naval Task Force at Oran on 8 November. Other ships had dealt with the warships in Oran's port of Mers-el-Kebir but the four 194-millimetre (7.6 in) coast-defence guns of Fort du Santon overlooking the harbour were still shooting at the British ships. Rodney fired 16 shells from her main guns before she was forced to disengage in response to a reported submarine but the French chose not to return fire. The ship resumed firing later that afternoon, again without reply. The following morning the French guns opened fire as the battleship closed the range, nearly hitting her. Rodney moved further out to sea and resumed her bombardment with the aid of a land-based spotter. Her shelling thus far had not had much effect on the fort as its guns began bombarding approaching American troops. At their request, the battleship resumed firing at the fort despite the presence of nearby troops and the French capitulated shortly afterwards.

==== 1943 ====
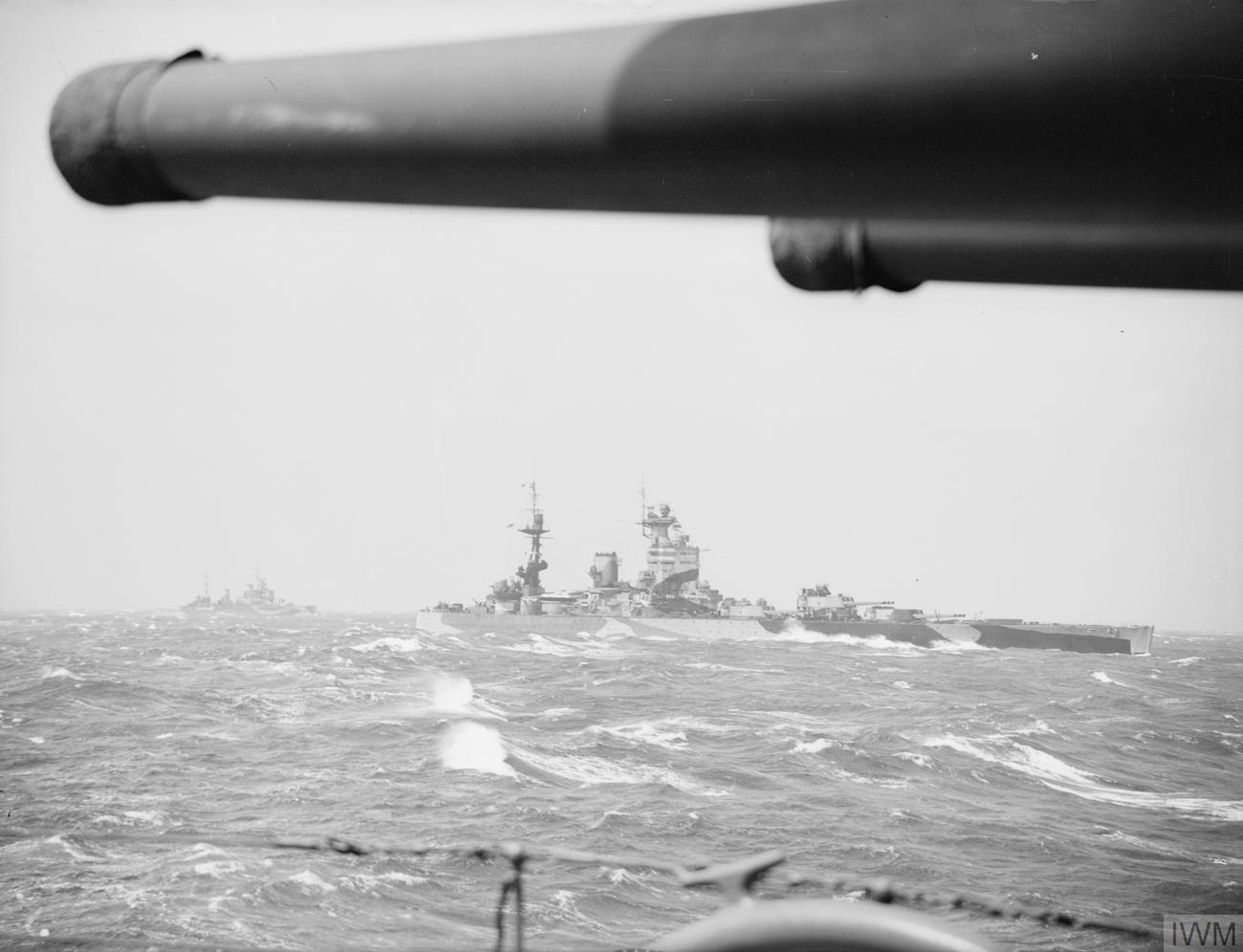
Nelson in the Western Mediterranean, seen from Rodney, April 1943.

Rodney remained in the Mediterranean until she departed for Devonport on 7 May 1943 to begin a brief refit that lasted until 28 May. The ship arrived at Scapa on 3 June to begin training for the invasion of Sicily (Operation Husky) and then rejoined Force H. She saw no combat during the landings, although there were many air raids while she was berthed in Grand Harbour, Malta. On 31 August Rodney joined her sister in bombarding coast-defence guns near Reggio di Calabria in preparation for the Allied crossing of the Strait of Messina from Sicily (Operation Baytown) on 3 September, blowing up an ammunition dump during her shoot. Force H provided support for the landings at Salerno (Operation Avalanche) on 9 September with the battleship only using her anti-aircraft guns. Captain Robert FitzRoy relieved Rivett-Carnac on 25 September. The ship arrived back in the UK on 5 November where she rejoined the Home Fleet. While at sea with the French battleship Richelieu to conduct a night gunnery exercise on 29 December, Rodney suffered weather damage during a severe storm that caused extensive flooding forward.

==== 1944 and the Normandy Landings ====
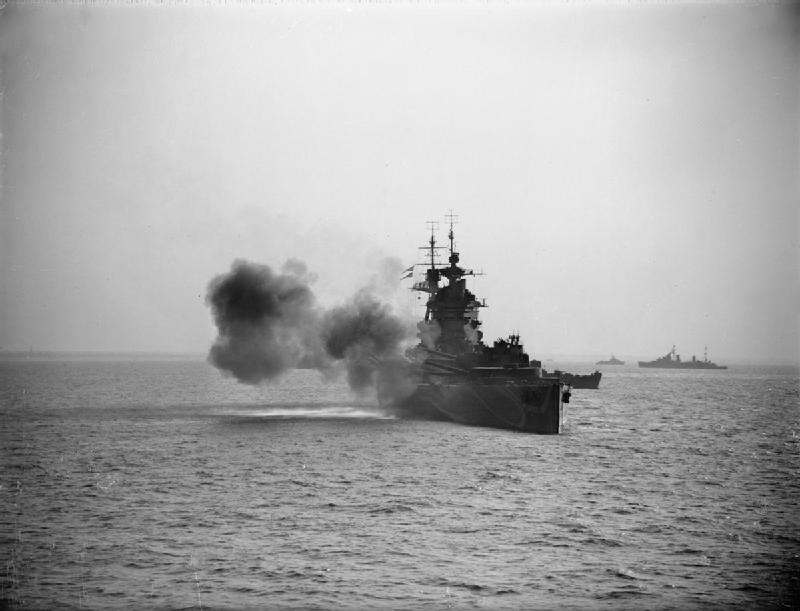
Rodney firing her main guns off Caen, June 1944

The ship departed Scapa on 16 January 1944 to begin repairs in Rosyth. Little effort was made to repair the persistent steering and boiler problems as efforts focused on making her seaworthy again. They were completed on 28 March, and Rodney steamed back to Scapa, where she arrived on 1 April. The ship spent most of the next few months conducting gunnery training, mostly shore bombardment but also anti-aircraft shoots and practice defending herself against attacks by E-boats. Although she was initially in reserve for the Normandy landings (Operation Overlord), Rodney did engage coast-defence guns near Le Havre with two armour-piercing 16-inch shells on 6 June. The ship was ordered forward to support operations off Sword Beach that night and accidentally rammed and sank LCT 427, killing all 13 crewmen, in the darkness and congested waters off the Isle of Wight.

Soon afterwards, another LCT rammed Rodney's bow, tearing a 9 ft-long (2.7 m) hole in her hull plates and crumpling the bow of the landing craft. After reaching her assigned position, the ship engaged targets north of Caen, possibly belonging to the 12th SS Panzer Division Hitlerjugend which was attacking British and Canadian troops near there. During her day's shooting Rodney expended 99 sixteen- and 132 six-inch shells. That night the ship moved to the waters off Juno Beach to avoid attacks by German light forces. Returning to Sword Beach on 8 June, she bombarded German troops and vehicles near Caen. The following morning Rodney began engaging targets in Caen proper, beginning the gradual devastation of the city, including the destruction of the spire of the Church of Saint-Pierre. That day the ship also fired at coast-defence guns at Houlgate and Benerville-sur-Mer. After an ineffectual air raid on the ships off Sword Beach that afternoon, Rodney withdrew to replenish her ammunition at Milford Haven.

The ship was kept in reserve until 18 June when her sister struck a mine and had to withdraw. A severe storm began the following day and caused all operations to cease. A LCT took shelter in the lee of the battleship for the duration of the storm and a trawler collided with Rodney on 21 June but was not seriously damaged. On the night of 23/24 June, the ship was ineffectually attacked twice by Junkers Ju 88 bombers; her gunners claiming one aircraft. Firing for the first time since her return, Rodney's guns began bombarding targets during Operation Epsom, which began on the 26th. These included a sporadic, 30-hour operation firing an occasional shell 22 miles (35 km) inland, to prevent a Panzer division from crossing a bridge. The ship also provided fire support during Operation Windsor, a partially successful Canadian assault on Carpiquet and its airfield west of Caen on 4 to 5 July, and Operation Charnwood, a frontal assault on Caen proper on 8 to 9 July. Some of the targets engaged were normally beyond the maximum range of Rodney's guns, but oil was pumped to one side to give the ship a temporary list which acted to increase the guns' elevation and range. After the end of Charnwood, the ship was withdrawn as Allied forces drove deeper into France. She had expended at total of 519 sixteen- and 454 six-inch shells during her sojourn off the Norman coast.

Long-range artillery on the German-occupied island of Alderney was disrupting Allied operations off the north west corner of the Cotentin Peninsula after the landings in Normandy. Rodney was tasked to eliminate the problem and bombarded Batterie Blücher on 12 August, taking up a position on the other side of the Cap de la Hague to avoid return fire. She fired 75 sixteen-inch shells at the artillery position, believing that three of the four guns had been damaged. Postwar analysis showed that although 40 shells had fallen within 200-metre (660 ft) of the centre of the battery, only one gun had actually been damaged and it was back in service by November. The other three guns resumed shooting at Allied ships by 30 August.

==== Post Invasion ====
After a fortnight in Portland, the ship arrived in Devonport on 27 August for repairs that were originally scheduled to last for a month or more. Her dockyard time was curtailed and Rodney was ordered north. She arrived in Scapa on 15 September and sailed the following day to escort Convoy JW 60 bound for Murmansk. The escorts dropped anchor at Vaenga on 23 September after an uneventful passage. Admiral Arseny Golovko visited the ship three days later to coordinate arrangements for defending the convoys. Rodney rendezvoused with the returning convoy RA 60 on 28 September. German submarines were able to sink two ships of the convoy against the loss of one of their own and the ship arrived at Scapa on 5 October. She became the Home Fleet flagship four days later when Admiral Sir Henry Moore hoisted his flag aboard her. Rodney generally remained at Scapa for the next year, the tedium relieved by a visit by King George VI, Queen Elizabeth and their daughters, Elizabeth and Margaret, in late September 1945. The ship steamed south in mid-November, bound for Portsmouth where Moore would transfer his flag to her sister. She arrived at Rosyth on 2 December where she was docked in No. 3 dry dock from 8 December until 1 March 1948; during this time, Rodney's condition was surveyed and her leaks were patched. She was transferred to BISCO early that year for disposal and the ship was allocated to Thos. W. Ward on 26 March to be scrapped at Inverkeithing.
