= British 24.5-inch torpedo =

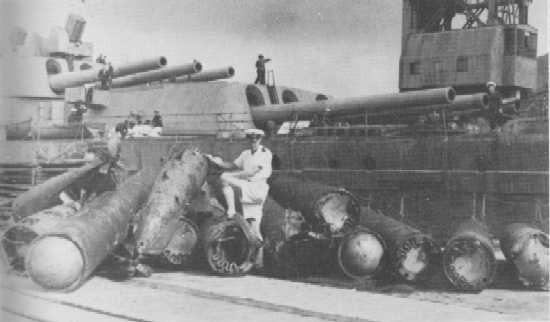
- Wrecked 24.5-inch Mark I torpedoes after HMS Nelson was torpedoed in 1941
- Type: Torpedo
- Place of origin: United Kingdom

Service history
- In service: 1925
- Used by: Royal Navy

Production history
- Designed: 1923

Specifications
- Mass: 5,700 pounds (2,600 kg)
- Length: 26 feet 7 inches (8.10 m)
- Diameter: 24.5 inches (62 cm)
- Effective firing range: 15,000 yards (14,000 m) at 35 knots (65 km/h); 20,000 yards (18,000 m) at 30 knots (56 km/h)
- Warhead: TNT
- Warhead weight: 743 pounds (337 kg)
- Propellant: Oxygen-enriched air
- Maximum speed: 30 knots (56 km/h) - 35 knots (65 km/h)
- Launch platform: Nelson-class battleships

The 24.5" Mark I torpedo was a British torpedo carried only on Nelson-class battleships. This was the type of torpedo that HMS Rodney fired at the German battleship Bismarck, "the only known occasion that a battleship successfully fired torpedoes at an enemy battleship."
