= HMAS Albatross (1928) =

1928 seaplane tender

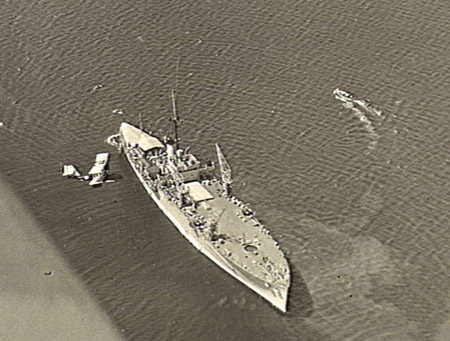
- HMAS Albatross with one of her aircraft overhead

History

Australia
- Builder: Cockatoo Docks and Engineering Company
- Laid down: 16 April 1926
- Launched: 23 February 1928
- Completed: 21 December 1928
- Commissioned: 23 January 1929
- Decommissioned: 26 April 1933
- Stricken: 1938
- Motto: "Usque Ad Nubes Prolem Emitto"
- Fate: Traded to Royal Navy as part payment for HMAS Hobart

United Kingdom
- Acquired: 1938
- Decommissioned: 3 August 1945
- Honours and awards: Atlantic 1939–42; Normandy 1944
- Fate: Sold for commercial use 19 August 1946, scrapped 1954
- Badge: On a Field Barry wavy white and blue an Albatross volant proper.

Greece
- Stricken: 12 August 1954
- Fate: Scrapped in Hong Kong

General characteristics
- Type: Seaplane tender until 1944, then repair ship
- Displacement: 4,800 tons (standard)
- Length: 443 ft 7 in (135.20 m)
- Beam: 58 ft (18 m) moulded; 77.75 ft (23.70 m) at sponsons
- Draught: 1930: 16 ft 11.5 in (5.169 m); 1936: 17.25 ft (5.26 m)
- Propulsion: 4 × Yarrow boilers, Parsons Turbines, 12,000 shp (8,900 kW), 2 shafts
- Speed: 22 knots (41 km/h; 25 mph)
- Range: 4,280 nmi (7,930 km; 4,930 mi) at 22 knots (41 km/h; 25 mph); 7,900 nmi (14,600 km; 9,100 mi) at 10 knots (19 km/h; 12 mph)
- Complement: 29 RAN officers, 375 RAN sailors, 8 RAAF officers, 38 RAAF enlisted
- Armament: 4 × 4.7-inch (120 mm) guns; 2 × 2-pounder (40 mm) pom-poms; 4 × 3-pounder saluting guns; 24 × .303-inch machine guns
- Aircraft carried: 9 aircraft (6 active, 3 reserve)
- Aviation facilities: 3 recovery cranes

HMAS Albatross (later HMS Albatross) was a seaplane tender of the Royal Australian Navy (RAN), which was later transferred to the Royal Navy and used as a repair ship. Albatross was built by Cockatoo Island Dockyard during the mid-1920s and entered service at the start of 1929. The ship experienced problems with the aircraft assigned to her during her career: the amphibious aircraft she had been designed for were retired just before the ship entered service, the replacement aircraft could not be catapult-launched from the ship, and a new plane designed specifically to work with the ship began operations after Albatross was demoted from seagoing status in 1933.

After five years in reserve, Albatross was transferred to the Royal Navy to offset the Australian purchase of the light cruiser Hobart. Although the British had little use for a seaplane carrier, the ship found a niche after two aircraft carriers were sunk by the Germans early in World War II. Albatross was initially based in Freetown, Sierra Leone for patrol and convoy escort duties in the southern Atlantic, then was relocated to the Indian Ocean in mid-1942. From late 1943 to early 1944, the vessel underwent conversion into a "Landing Ship (Engineering)" to support the Normandy landings, and was used to repair landing craft and other support vessels off Sword and Juno Beaches. Albatross was torpedoed in October, but survived to be towed back to England and repaired. After repairs completed at the start of 1945, she served as a minesweeper depot ship, but was decommissioned after the war's end.

Albatross was sold into civilian service in August 1946, and after several changes of hands was renamed Hellenic Prince in 1948 and converted into a passenger liner. The vessel was chartered by the International Refugee Organization to transport refugees from Europe to Australia. Hellenic Prince saw service as a troopship during the 1953 Mau Mau uprising, but was broken up for scrap a year later.

== Design and construction ==
In 1925, Governor-General Lord Stonehaven announced the construction of a seaplane carrier, to the surprise of both the RAN and RAAF. The decision to acquire a seaplane carrier was prompted by both the need to provide work during the high unemployment of the 1920s and the realisation that a conventional aircraft carrier was outside the ability of the RAN to finance or man. The Australian Commonwealth Naval Board requested that the British Admiralty supply a basic design for a seaplane carrier, with the conditions that the ship have a top speed of 20 knots (37 km/h; 23 mph), and cost under 400,000 pounds if built in a British shipyard.

The ship displaced 4,800 tons at standard load. She was 443 feet 7 inches (135.20 m) long overall, with a beam of 58 feet (18 m) at her moulded depth and 77.75 feet (23.70 m) over the gun sponsons, and an initial maximum draught of 16 feet 11.5 inches (5.169 m), although this had increased to 17.25 feet (5.26 m) by 1936. The propulsion machinery consisted of four Yarrow boilers supplying Parsons geared turbines. These generated 12,000 shaft horsepower (8,900 kW), which was fed to two propeller shafts. Although Albatross was designed with a maximum speed of 20 knots (37 km/h; 23 mph), full-power trials showed that the ship was capable of 22 knots (41 km/h; 25 mph). At that speed, she had a range of 4,280 nautical miles (7,930 km; 4,930 mi), although she could cover 7,900 nautical miles (14,600 km; 9,100 mi) at the more economical 10 knots (19 km/h; 12 mph). Albatross' armament consisted of four QF 4.7-inch Mk VIII naval guns, four QF 2-pounder pom-pom guns, four QF 3-pounder Hotchkiss saluting guns, four .303-inch Vickers machine guns, and twenty .303-inch Lewis machine guns (ten singles and five twin mounts). The ship's company consisted of 29 RAN officers, 375 RAN sailors, 8 RAAF officers, and 38 RAAF enlisted.

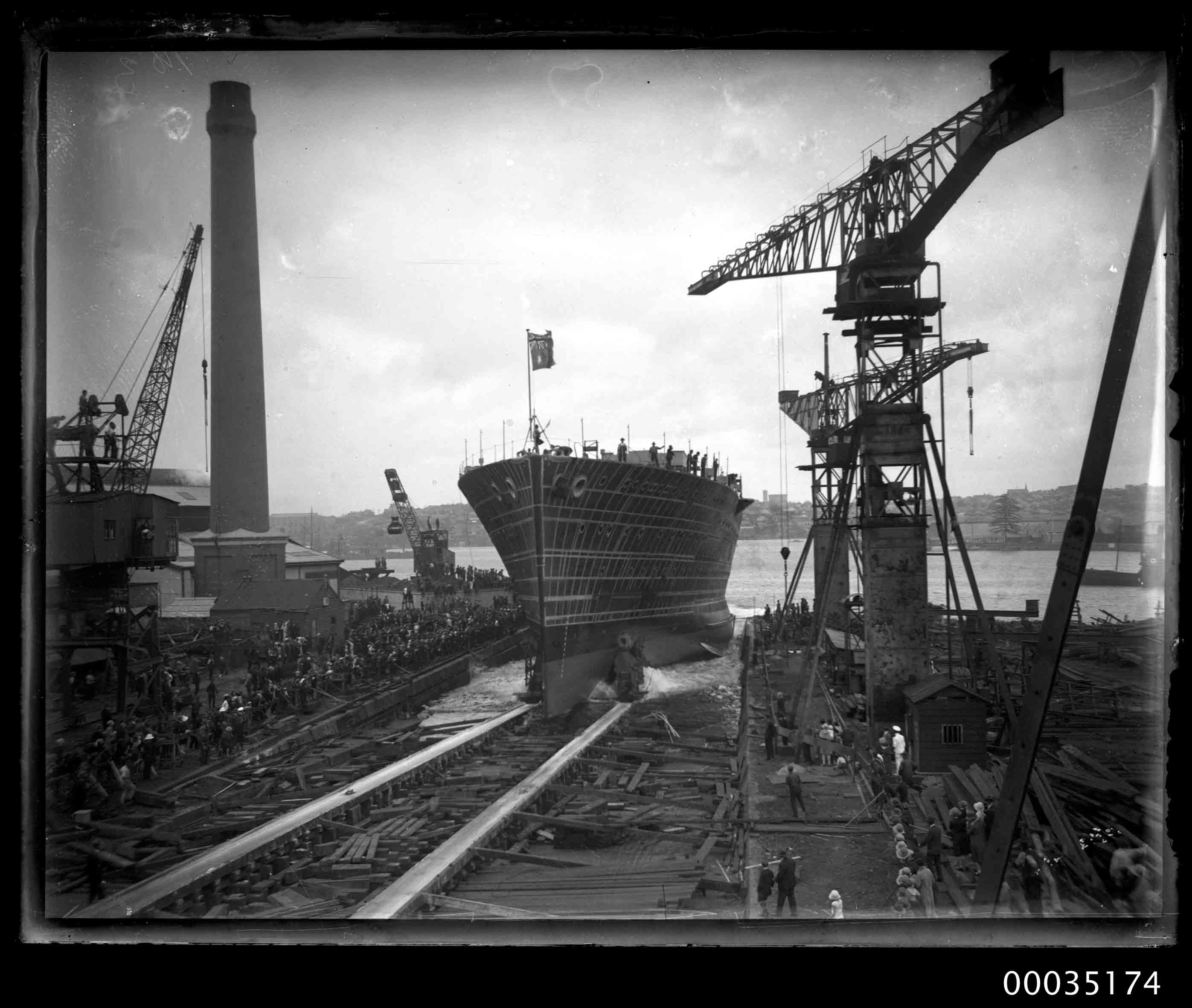
The launch of Albatross in 1926

Development of the ship from the Admiralty sketch design was based around the Fairey IIID seaplane being operated for the RAN by the Royal Australian Air Force's No. 101 Flight. Albatross could carry up to nine aircraft—six active and three in reserve—in three internal hangars; their incorporation inside the ship's hull resulted in an unusually high freeboard in the forward half of the vessel, and forced the propulsion machinery, accommodation, and bridge to all be located in the aft half. Three recovery cranes were used to manipulate the aircraft. The Faireys were removed from service shortly before Albatross entered service, and were replaced by the Supermarine Seagull Mark III. The Mark IIIs were unsuited for operations aboard Albatross, particularly as the aircraft were not durable enough to withstand catapult launches. Specifications for a new aircraft design were drawn up to the RAN and RAAF, and Supermarine designed the Seagull Mark V (later to be called the Walrus) specifically for Albatross, although the design was later adopted by the Royal Navy. Albatross was removed from seagoing service in 1933, two months before the Mark Vs entered service, although the aircraft were operated from the vessel while she was at anchor. In addition, the new Seagulls were too tall to manoeuvre around inside the hangars, although this problem was worked around by placing the aircraft, with undercarriage retracted, on specially designed trolleys.

Albatross was laid down by the Cockatoo Docks and Engineering Company at the Cockatoo Island Dockyard, Sydney on 16 April 1926. She was launched by the wife of the Governor-General of Australia, Baron Stonehaven of Ury on 23 February 1928. Albatross was completed on 21 December 1928, and commissioned into the RAN on 23 January 1929. She cost 1,200,000 pounds to construct.

== Operational history ==
=== Royal Australian Navy ===
HMAS Albatross began her first cruise a week after commissioning, visiting Tasmania and Victoria. On 11 April 1929, the ship was sent from Sydney to off Wyndham, Western Australia to search for Sir Charles Kingsford Smith and the Southern Cross, which had disappeared while en route to England. Before the ship could reach the area, Smith was found, having made an emergency landing near the Glenelg River.

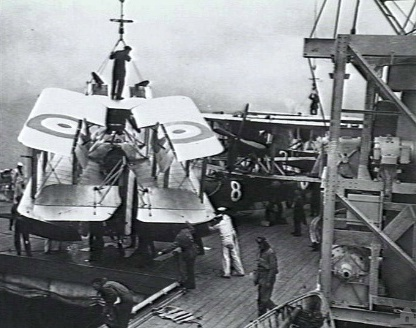
A Seagull III amphibian being manoeuvred towards the hangar hatch following recovery

In November 1931, the ship's engines were damaged by sabotage. This occurred again in September 1932. The acts of sabotage were attributed to widespread unrest among the sailors at the time; the RAN claimed at the time that Communist influence was the cause, although Tom Frame and Kevin Baker ascribe it to Depression-era pay cuts and retrentions, which were more likely to be forced onto sailors than officers.

From December 1931, Albatross was refitted, recommissioning as a gunnery training ship early in 1932, and on 19 March 1932, took part in the ceremonial opening of the Sydney Harbour Bridge.

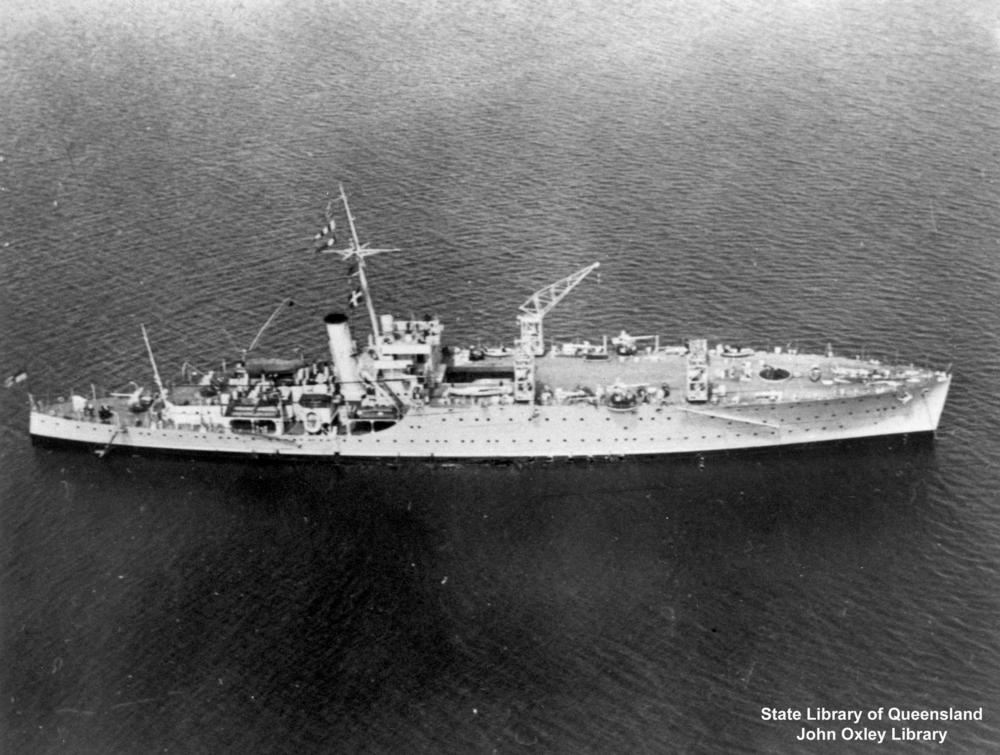
Albatross in 1938

On 26 April 1933, Albatross was decommissioned into reserve and anchored in Sydney Harbour, although seaplanes continued to operate from the ship. In 1938, with the Australian government experiencing difficulties in funding the purchase of the light cruiser Hobart, the Admiralty agreed to accept Albatross as part payment for Hobart (266,500 pounds was credited against the cruiser's purchase price). The seaplane carrier was recommissioned on 19 April for the voyage to England, and departed on 11 July, with the ship's company transferring to Hobart on arrival.

=== Royal Navy ===
There was originally little need for a seaplane carrier in the Royal Navy, as several aircraft carriers were operational, and most warships from cruiser size up carried their own seaplanes. After arrival in Britain Albatross was commissioned at Devonport as a trials ship, but in December that year, she was paid off. The ship's catapult was removed, and she was employed as an Accommodation ship. However, the loss of the aircraft carriers Courageous and Glorious early in World War II created scope for the ship's use. Albatross was assigned to Freetown in western Africa, where she and her aircraft were used for convoy escort, anti-submarine warfare, and air-sea rescue in the Atlantic.

In May 1942, Albatross was transferred to the Indian Ocean to bolster trade protection there with the Eastern Fleet based at Kilindini, and in September provided air support for landings at Mayotte, during the Madagascan campaign. After this, trade protection duties were resumed and continued until July 1943 (apart from refits at Durban and Bombay). Albatross then returned to Britain, where, in September, she was paid off.

From October 1943 until early 1944, Albatross underwent major conversion, to a Landing Ship – Engineering (LSE), to support the Normandy landings. She was initially deployed in the Thames estuary as part of the deceptions to divert enemy attention away from Normandy, but on 8 June 1944, she was moved to Gooseberry 5, off Sword Beach at Ouistreham to provide repair facilities and supply anti-aircraft and bombardment support. Her allocation immediately followed the assault and coincided with the "great storm" that disrupted Allied plans. Her repair duties at Sword saved 79 craft from total loss and returned 132 more to service off the beachhead. In July, Albatross returned to Portsmouth for replenishment and to rest her crew and, on return to Normandy, she was reallocated to Juno Beach.

On 11 August, while off Courseulles-sur-Mer, Albatross was hit by a torpedo which inflicted major structural damage and killed 66 of the ship's company. Albatross was withdrawn from service and towed to Portsmouth by the Dutch tug Zwart Zee. Her repairs lasted until early 1945. After a brief spell as a minesweeper depot ship, she was paid off into reserve on 3 August 1945.

=== Post-war ===
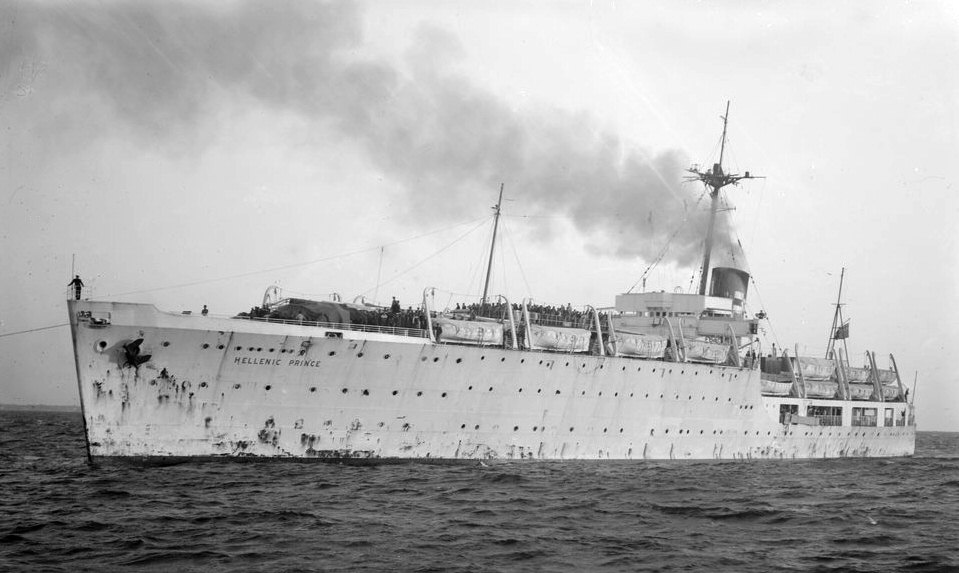
Hellenic Prince photographed between 1949 and 1951

Albatross was sold to a British company on 19 August 1946 for commercial use. The plan was to originally convert her into a luxury liner, but as the refurbishment was financially prohibitive, it was instead proposed that she be renamed Pride of Torquay and used as a floating cabaret at Torquay. Before this went through, the ship was purchased on 14 November 1948 by the British-Greek Yannoulatos Group, and was renamed Hellenic Prince to recognise the birth of Prince Charles on that day, and his Greek heritage. The vessel was converted into a passenger liner at Barry in Wales.

In 1949, she was chartered by the International Refugee Organization as a refugee transport to relocate displaced persons from Europe to Australia. On 5 December 1949, Hellenic Prince arrived in Sydney Harbour with 1,000 passengers.

In 1953, Hellenic Prince was used as a troopship during the Mau Mau uprising. The ship's career finally ended when she was scrapped at Hong Kong on 12 August 1954.
