= Panting (ship construction) =

Tendency of steel hull plating

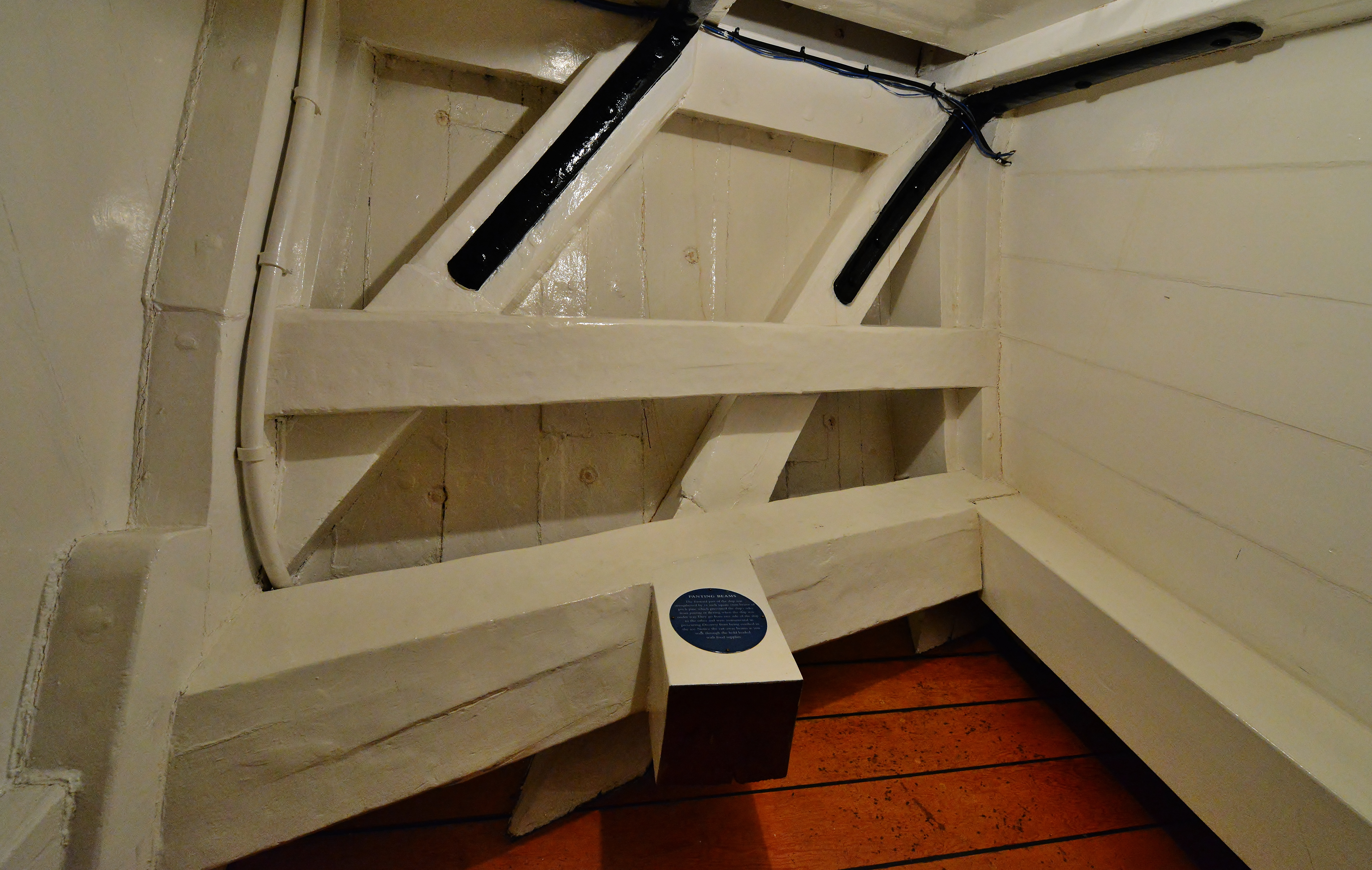
Panting beams used to strengthen the bow of a ship (RRS Discovery).

Panting refers to the tendency of steel hull plating to flex in and out like an oil can being squeezed when a ship is pitching. This occurs when a ship is making headway in waves. Panting creates significant stress on a ship's hull. It is potentially dangerous and can result in flooding and the separation of the hull and deck. The British battleship HMS Rodney suffered significant leaking from panting. Addressing panting is an essential component of ship design. It is typically countered by reinforcing the bow and the stern with beams and stringers.
