= List of naval anti-aircraft guns =

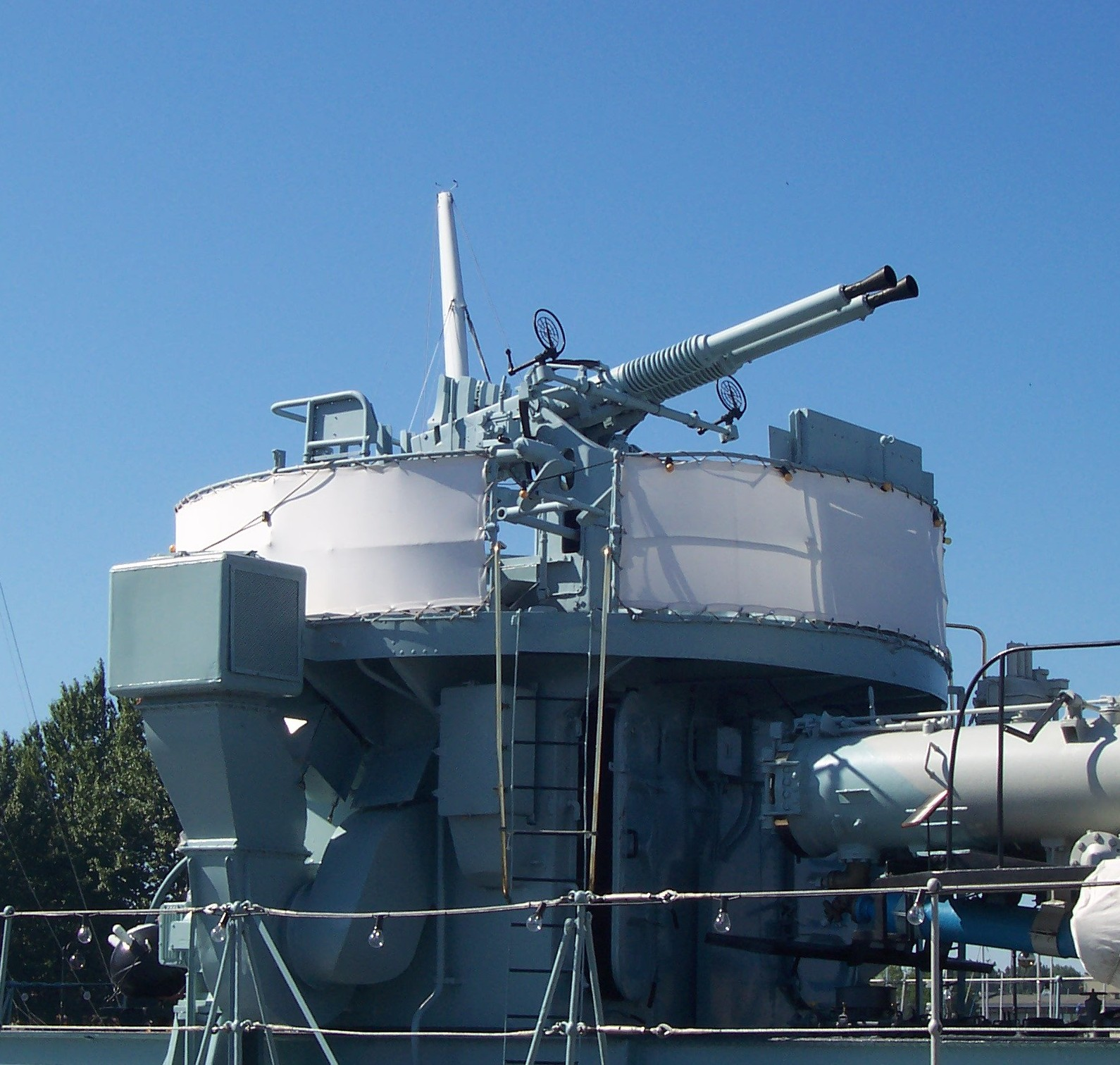
Twin Bofors 40mm guns

Naval anti-aircraft guns include anti-aircraft guns designed or adapted for mounting on ships and naval guns adapted for high-angle fire.

| mm | Barrels | Name | Origin | Time |
|---|---|---|---|---|
| 20 | 1 or 2 | Oerlikon 20 mm cannon | Switzerland | World War II |
| 20 | 4 | Flakvierling 38 cannon | Nazi Germany | World War II |
| 20 | 1 | Bofors akan m/40 | Sweden | World War II |
| 25 | 1 or 2 | Bofors lvakan m/32 | Sweden | Interwar |
| 25 | 1, 2, or 3 | Type 96 25 mm AT/AA Gun | Empire of Japan | World War II |
| 28 | 4 | 1.1"/75 (28mm) gun | United States | World War II |
| 37 | 2 | 3.7 cm SK C/30 | Nazi Germany | World War II |
| 40 | 1, 4, or 8 | Vickers QF 2-pounder Mk II, Mk VIII | United Kingdom | World War I, World War II |
| 40 | 1, 2, or 4 | Bofors 40 mm Automatic Gun L/60 | Sweden | World War II |
| 45 | 1 or 2 | 45 mm anti-aircraft gun (21-K) | Soviet Union | World War II |
| 76.2 | | QF 3 inch 20 cwt | United Kingdom | World War I |
| 76.2 | | 3"/23 caliber gun | United States | World War I, 1920s |
| 76.2 | 1 or 2 | 3"/50 caliber gun | United States | World War I - World War II - Cold War |
| 76.2 | 2 | 3"/70 Mark 26 gun | United States United Kingdom | Cold War |
| 100 | 2 | 10 cm/65 Type 98 naval gun | Empire of Japan | World War II |
| 102 | | QF 4 inch Mk V naval gun | United Kingdom | World War I, World War II |
| 102 | 1 or 2 | QF 4 inch Mk XVI naval gun | United Kingdom | World War II, Cold War |
| 105 | 2 | 10.5 cm SK C/33 | Nazi Germany | World War II |
| 113 | 1 or 2 | QF 4.5 inch Mk I - V naval gun | United Kingdom | World War II, Cold War |
| 120 | | QF 4.7 inch Mk VIII naval gun | United Kingdom | 1920s, World War II |
| 120 | 2 | QF 4.7-inch Mk XI naval gun | United Kingdom | World War II - Cold War |
| 120 | 1 or 2 | Type 10 120 mm AA Gun | Empire of Japan | 1921, World War II |
| 127 | | 5"/25 caliber gun | United States | 1920s, World War II |
| 127 | 2 | 12.7 cm/40 Type 89 naval gun | Empire of Japan | 1932, World War II |
| 127 | 1 or 2 | 5"/38 caliber gun | United States | 1934, World War II, Cold War |
| 127 | | 5"/54 caliber Mark 16 gun | United States | Cold War, Korean War |
| 127 | | 5"/54 caliber Mark 42 gun | United States | Cold War, Korean War, Vietnam War |
| 133 | 2 | QF 5.25 inch Mark I naval gun | United Kingdom | World War II |
| 152 | 2 | 6"/47 caliber Mark 16 gun | United States | Cold War, Korean War |
| 152 | 2 | QF 6-inch Mark N5 gun | United Kingdom | Cold War |
