= QF 4.7-inch Mk VIII naval gun =

QF 4.7 inch Gun Mk VIII
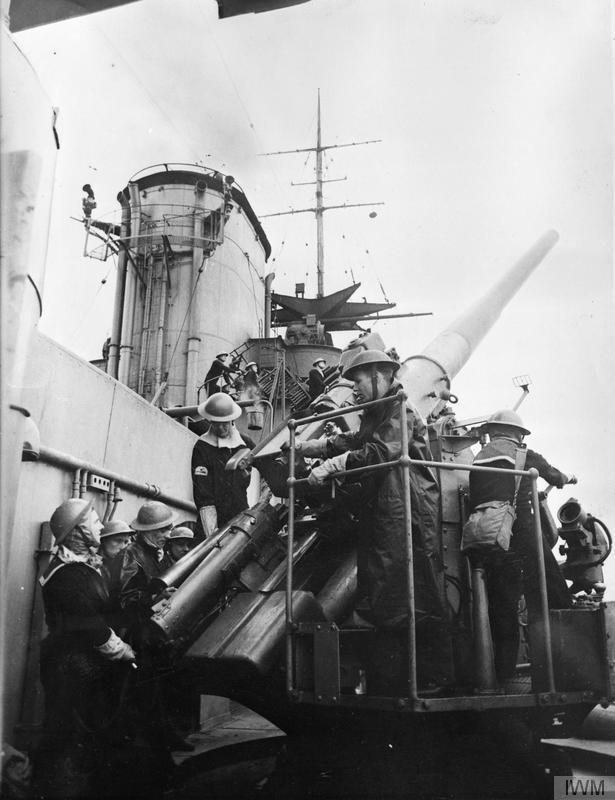
- One gun on HMS Rodney before 1940
- Type: Naval anti-aircraft gun
- Place of origin: United Kingdom

Service history
- In service: 1927–1945
- Used by: British Empire
- Wars: World War II

Production history
- No. built: 84

Specifications
- Mass: 6,636 pounds (3,010 kg)
- Barrel length: 189 inches (4.8 m) L/40
- Shell weight: Complete 76 pounds (34.5 kg); Projectile 50 pounds (22.7 kg)
- Calibre: 4.724 inches (120 mm)
- Elevation: –5° to +90
- Traverse: 360°
- Rate of fire: 8–12 rounds per minute
- Muzzle velocity: 2,457 feet per second (749 m/s)
- Maximum firing range: 16,160 yards (14,780 m) at 45° 32,000 feet (9,800 m) at 90°

The QF 4.7 inch Gun Mark VIII was a British naval anti-aircraft gun designed in the 1920s for the Royal Navy. This was the largest caliber fixed ammunition gun ever in service in the RN, though the round was considerably shorter and lighter than the round for the QF 4.5-inch Mk I – V naval gun. It was carried in powered HA XII mountings on the two Nelson-class battleships, two of the three Courageous-class aircraft carriers, the minelayer HMS Adventure, and the Australian seaplane tender HMAS Albatross.

== See also ==
- List of naval anti-aircraft guns

=== Weapons of comparable role, performance and era ===
- Type 10 120 mm AA Gun: Japanese equivalent

== Bibliography ==
- Tony DiGiulian. "British 4.7"/43 (12 cm) QF Mark VII 4.7"/40 (12 cm) QF Mark VIII 4.7"/40 (12 cm) QF Mark X".
- Campbell, John (1985). Naval Weapons of World War Two. Naval Institute Press. ISBN 0-87021-459-4.
