= Slave raid of Suðuroy =

Barbary slave raids against the Faroe Islands

Faroe Islands

The Slave raid of Suðuroy was a slave raid by North African Barbary pirates that took place in the Faroe Islands in the summer of 1629. More than thirty people, mainly women and children, were taken from the archipelago's southern island, Suðuroy. None were ever ransomed, and remained slaves in North Africa.

== Background ==
The isolated Faroe Islands had a long history of problems with pirates as well as fishermen intruding on the islands' fishing waters. Because of its geographical position, and its small population with limited possibilities to defend themselves, the islands became a popular resting place for pirates, who stopped along its beaches to pause. During those pauses, the poor and defenseless population were sometimes exposed to pillage and theft, and were unable to defend themselves other than by running to high mountainous terrain and by throwing stones at the pirates. Raids by Irish, English and Barbary pirates became worse in the early 17th-century.

In 1607, both Iceland and the Faroe Islands were subjected to a slave raid by the Barbary pirates, who abducted hundreds of people for the slave markets of North Africa.

== Raid ==
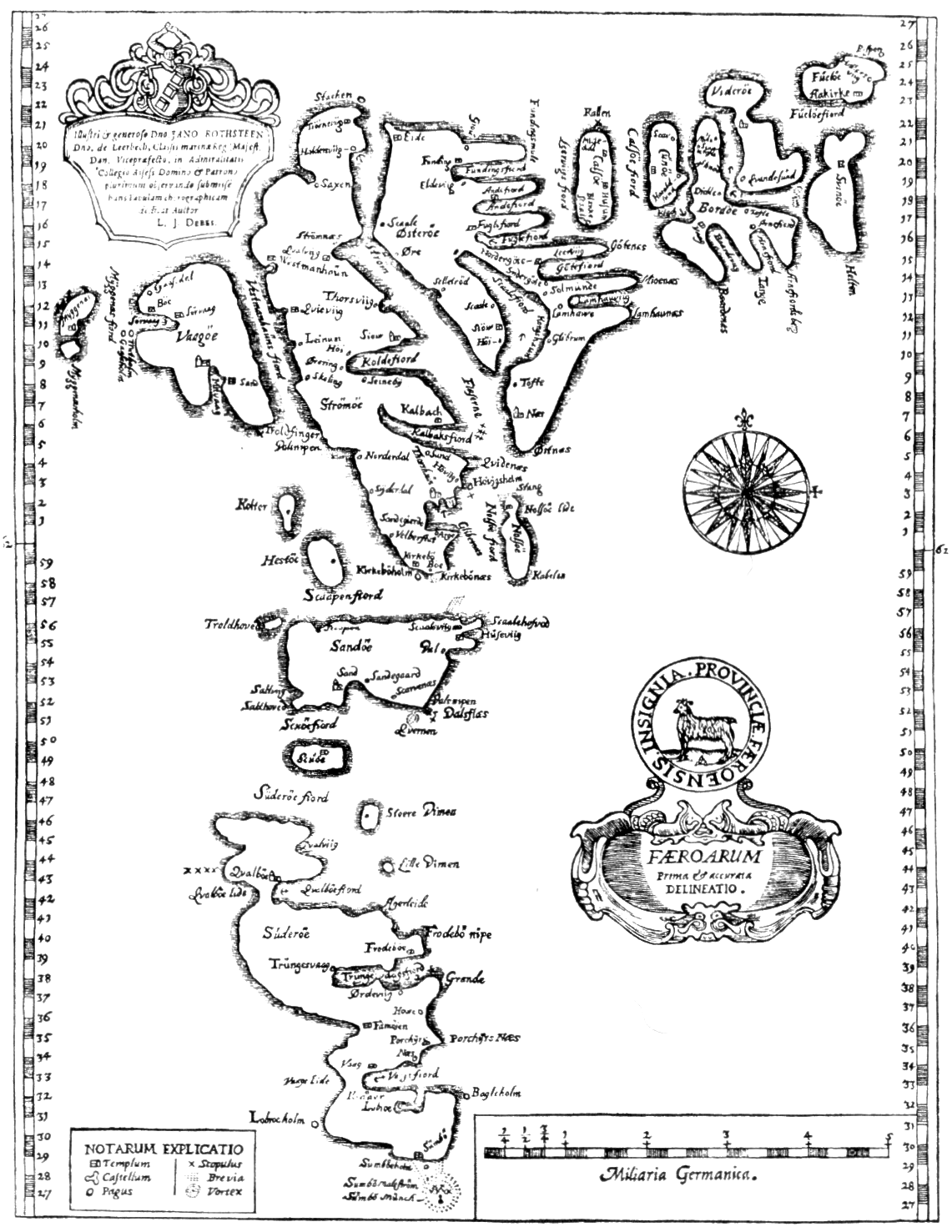
Faroe Islands with Kvalbø Fjord on Suderø (southern island) by Lucas Debes, 1673

In the summer of 1629, three Barbary pirate ships with 500 pirates entered the bay of Hvalba in Suðuroy. They had a Faroese guide, the brother of the owner of the Nøstgaard farm, who felt that his brother had cheated him on his inheritance, and who showed the pirates to his brother's farm and the rest of the parish.

Parishioners fled to hide in caves and between rocks in the highlands. Six people were reportedly killed during the pillage, while over thirty women and children were abducted. Among the children taken was the seven-year-old son of the parish pastor, Reverend Povel. The pastor reportedly in his desperation sang a galdr ('spell') against the pirate ship containing his son. This was seen as the reason why the ship ran aground; all onboard drowned including his son. This caused the pastor to become mentally unstable for the rest of his life.

The remaining ships left the island the day after the attack. Those inhabitants in hiding testified afterwards that they could hear the captives crying and screaming from inside the pirate ships as they sailed away.

== Legacy ==
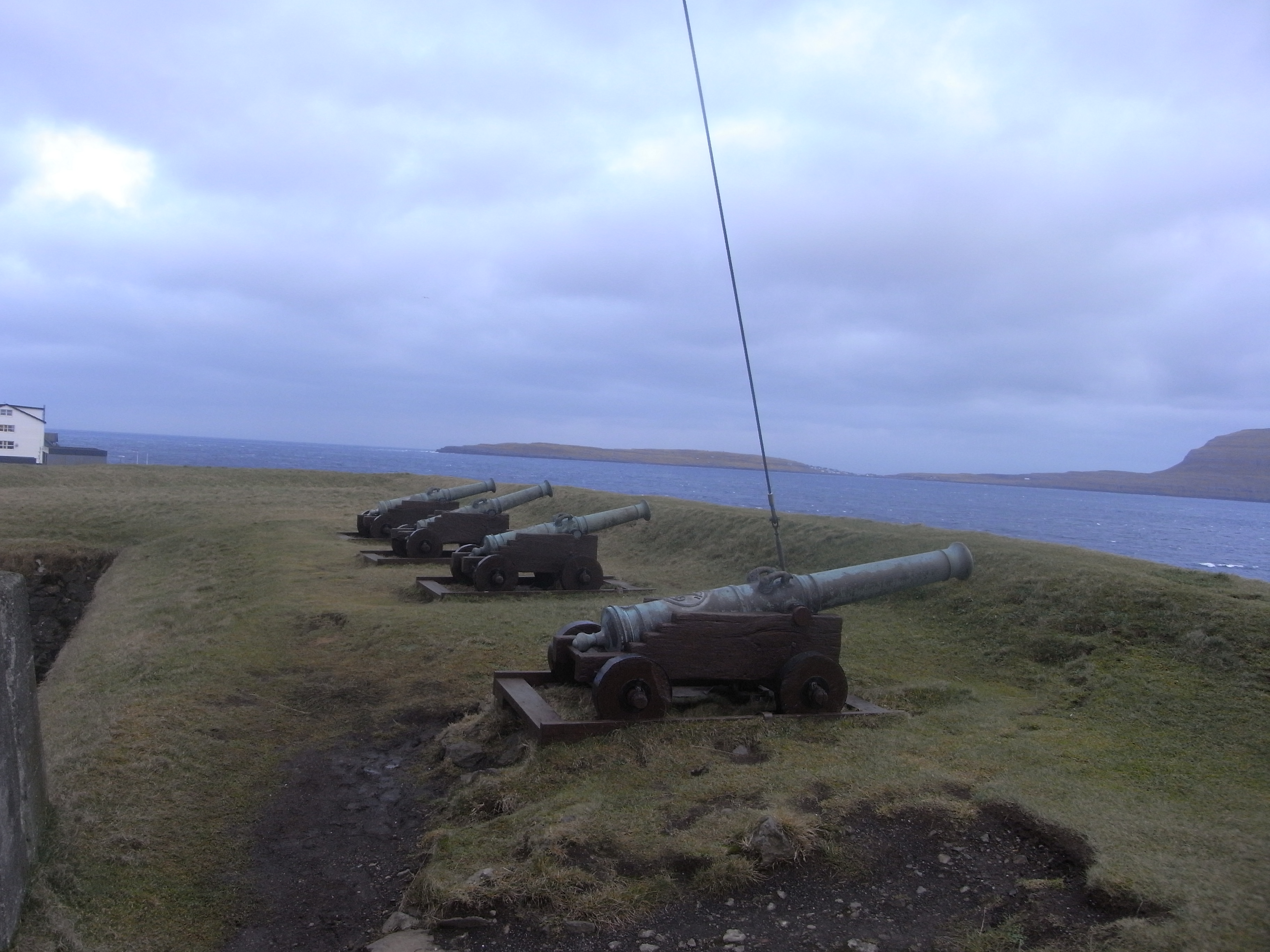
Skansin fortress in Thorshavn

On 6 July 1629, the survivors and authorities wrote a letter to King Christian IV to ask for his protection against the pirates. When informed about the women and children abducted, the king ordered the Faroese population to collect a ransom for the prisoners to save them from slavery. However, the Faroese replied that the poverty caused by several years of piracy on the island had made it impossible to raise any ransom.

In 1630, Skansin fortress in Thorshavn was built by order of Christian IV to enable the Faroese population to defend themselves. Pirate raids continued throughout the 17th century, however no successful raids are noted until the 1660s.

== See also ==
- Sack of Baltimore
- Turkish Abductions
- Barbary slave trade
- Sklavenkasse
- Ottoman raids on Moravia
- Ottoman raids in Friuli
