= BL 5.5-inch Mk I naval gun =

BL 5.5-inch Mark I
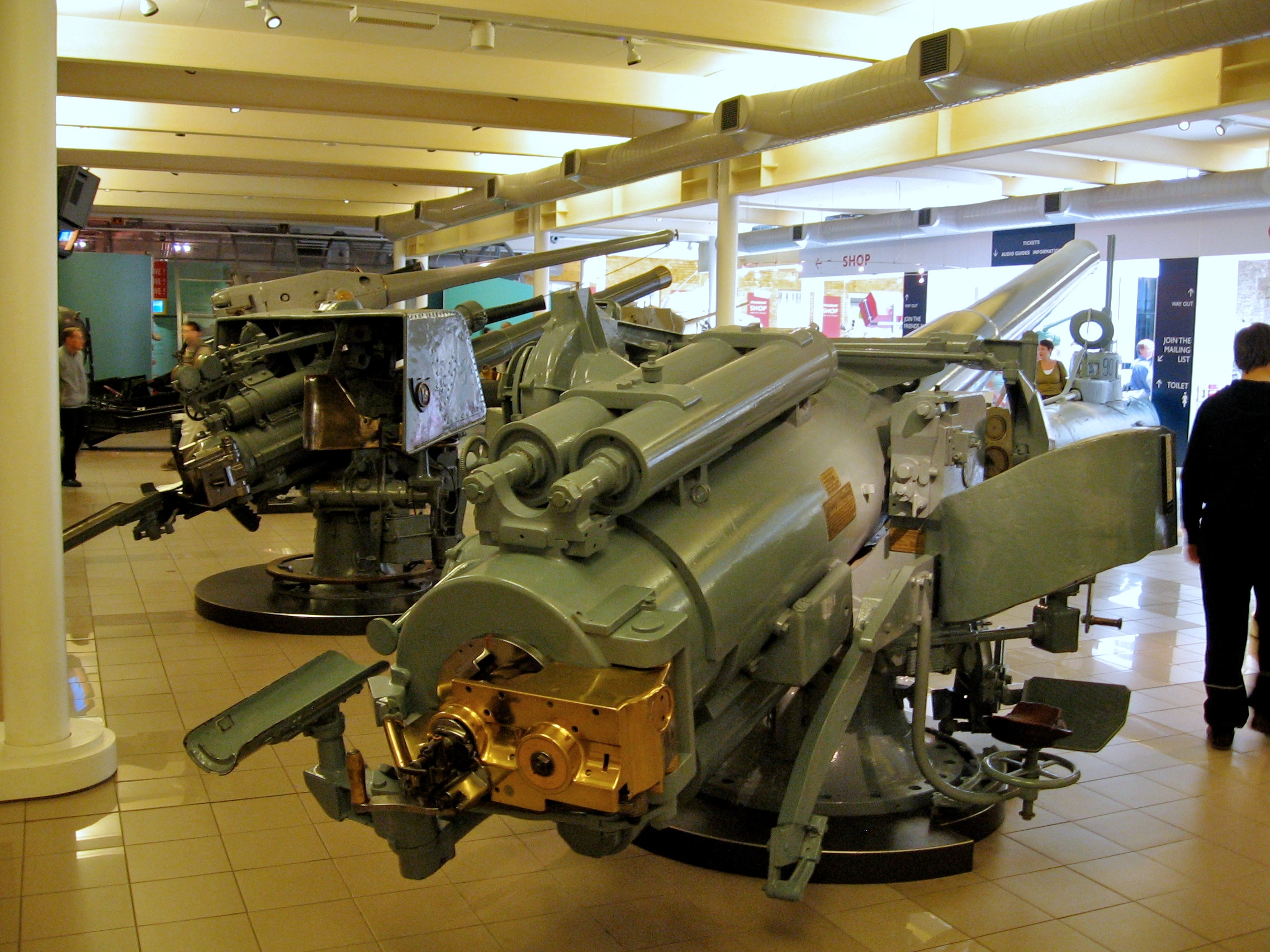
- One of HMS Chester's 5.5-inch guns at the Imperial War Museum, London
- Type: Naval gun, Coastal defence
- Place of origin: United Kingdom

Service history
- In service: 1913–1954
- Wars: World War I World War II

Production history
- Designer: Coventry Ordnance Works
- Designed: 1913
- Manufacturer: Coventry Ordnance Works
- No. built: 81

Specifications
- Mass: 13,955 lbs (6,330 kg)
- Length: 275 inches (7.0 m) L/50
- Shell: 82 pounds (37.19 kg)
- Calibre: 5.5-inch (140 mm)
- Breech: Welin breech block with Holmstrom mechanism
- Elevation: -7 degrees to +30 degrees depending on mount
- Rate of fire: 12 rounds per minute
- Muzzle velocity: 2,790 f/s (850 m/s)
- Effective firing range: 17,800 yards (16,300 m) at 30-degree elevation

The Breech Loading 5.5-inch Mk I was a naval gun used by the British Royal Navy during both World Wars.

== Naval history ==
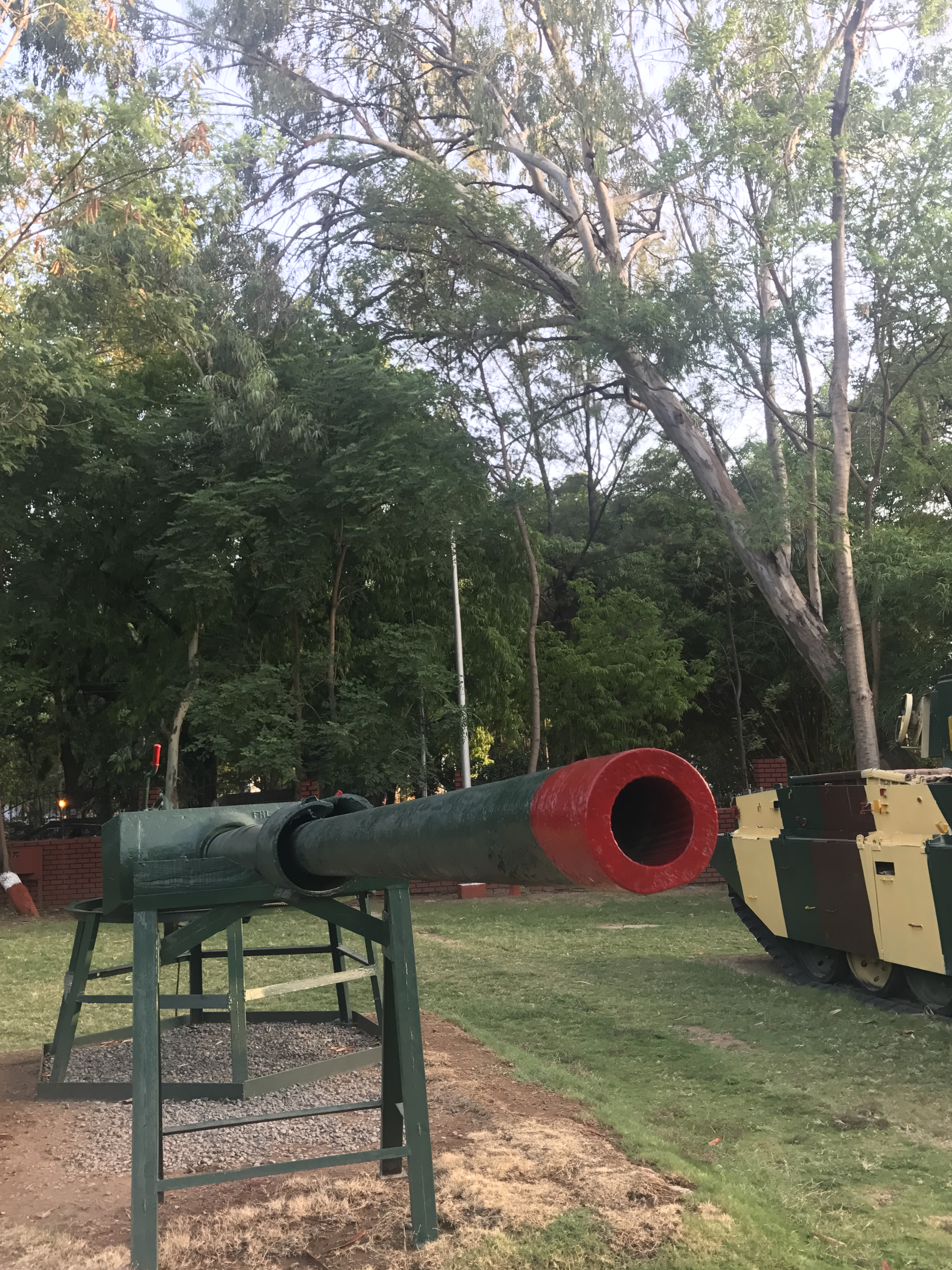
5.5-inch Mk I at National War Memorial Southern Command

This weapon was developed by Coventry Ordnance Works in 1913 and offered to the Greek Navy as the main armament for two new cruisers building at Cammell Laird. On the outbreak Of World War I the two ships were purchased by Britain as HMS Chester and HMS Birkenhead. The RN was happy with the performance of the gun as it was significantly lighter than the standard 6 inch gun and fired an 82 lb shell rather than the 100 lb shell of the 6 inch weapon. It, therefore, had a higher rate of fire with little loss in hitting power. The British ordered more guns as secondary armament for HMS Furious and HMS Hood. A total of 81 guns were made and were used on the following ships: HMS Chester, HMS Birkenhead, HMS Furious, HMS Hood, and HMS Hermes.

Guns removed from Chester, Birkenhead and Furious were used to arm Armed Merchant cruisers: HMS Laurentic and HMS Montclare.

== Coast defence gun ==
The 5.5 inch guns were removed from HMS Hood in the 1935 refit. In 1940 two were installed in Fort Bedford Battery on Ascension Island and remain there today. A pair were installed in specially built casemates on the roof of Coalhouse Fort in Essex, overlooking the Thames. Guns from the Hood also went to Bognor Regis, Pevensey, North Foreland, Dover and Folkestone.

== Notable actions ==
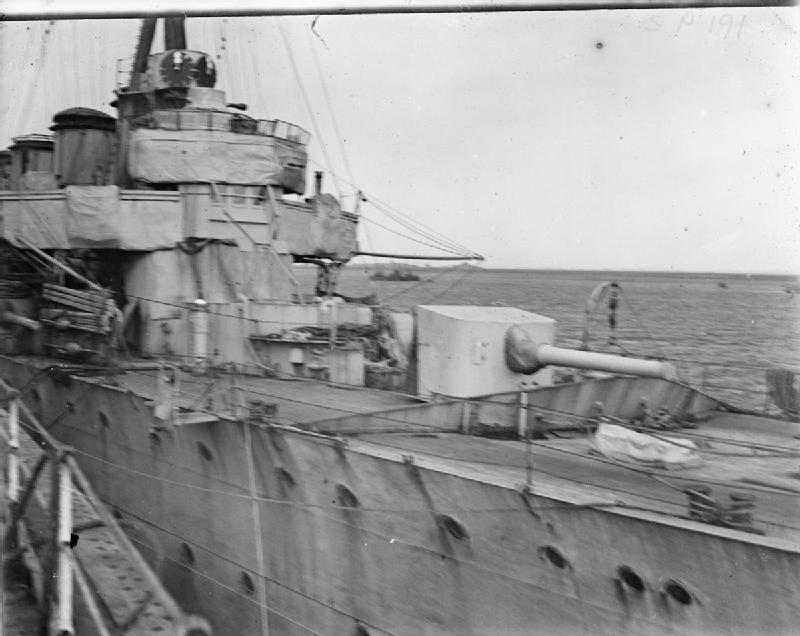
The gun Jack Cornwell served in his Victoria Cross action on the forecastle of HMS Chester

Boy Seaman First Class Jack Cornwell was posthumously awarded the Victoria Cross for heroism in serving his gun on HMS Chester during the Battle of Jutland on 31 May 1916.

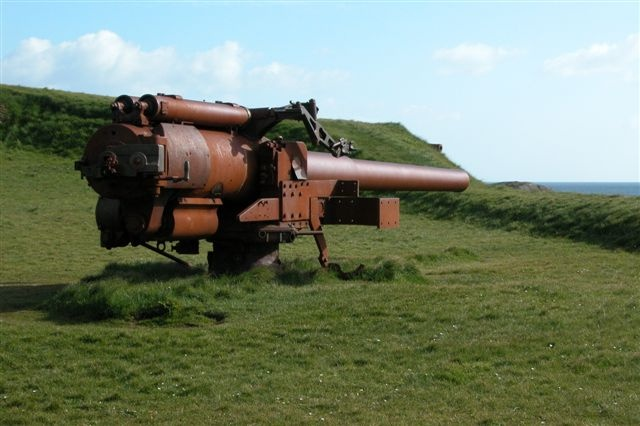
British 5.5-inch naval gun from World War II at Skansin fortress, Tórshavn, Faroe Islands

== Surviving examples ==
- The gun served by Jack Cornwell VC is preserved in the Imperial War Museum in London.
- Fort Bedford, Cross Hill, Ascension Island has two guns from HMS Hood
- Fort Skansin, Tórshavn, Streymoy Island, Faroe Islands, has two guns (No. 35 and 42) from HMS Furious

== See also ==
- List of naval guns

=== Weapons of comparable role, performance and era ===
- Canon de 138 mm Modèle 1910 Naval gun : French equivalent
- 14 cm/50 3rd Year Type naval gun : Japanese equivalent

== Bibliography ==
- Campbell, John (1985). Naval Weapons of World War II. Naval Institute Press. ISBN 0-87021-459-4.
