= Elharar =

Elharar (also spelled El Harar, Lharar or L'Harar) is a Jewish surname found among Moroccan Jews. It means "The Liberators" in Judeo-Moroccan Arabic. This name comes from the history of the Jews in Morocco. Barbary corsairs would kidnap and then ransom their captives. Families and communities would buy the freedom of these kidnapped individuals, a Jewish practice called pidyon shevuyim. The families that would buy back the kidnapped individuals were given the surname "The Liberators."

- Dudu Elharar (born 1945), Israeli singer and musician
- Karin Elharar (born 1977), Israeli lawyer and politician

== See also ==
- Pidyon shvuyim
