= HMS Birkenhead (1915) =

Light cruiser

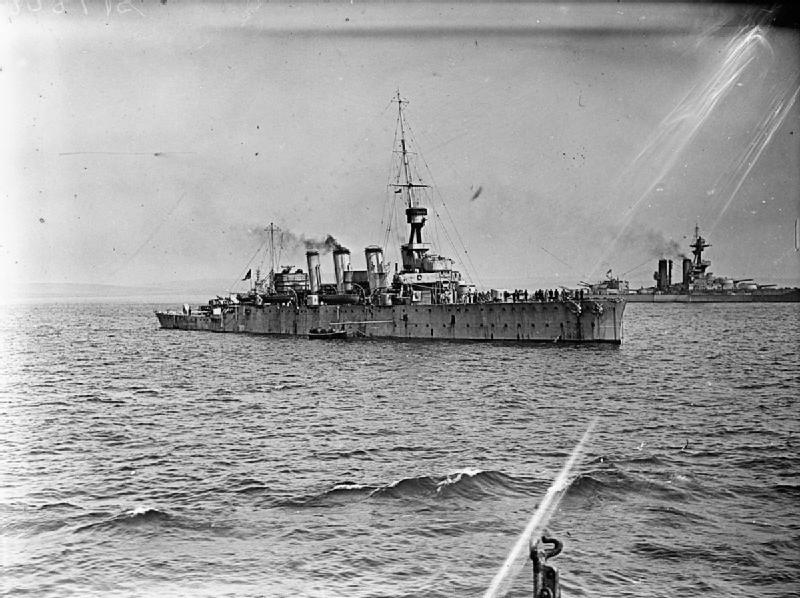

History

Greece
- Name: Antinavarchos Kountouriotis
- Namesake: Pavlos Kountouriotis
- Builder: Cammell Laird, Birkenhead, England
- Laid down: 21 March 1914
- Launched: 18 January 1915
- Fate: Sold to the United Kingdom, 1915

United Kingdom
- Namesake: Birkenhead
- Acquired: 1915
- Commissioned: May 1915
- Renamed: HMS Birkenhead
- Fate: Sold for scrap, 26 October 1921

General characteristics (as built)
- Class & type: Town-class light cruiser
- Displacement: 5,235 long tons (5,319 t)
- Length: 430 ft (131.1 m) p/p; 456 ft 6 in (139.1 m) o/a
- Beam: 49 ft 10 in (15.2 m)
- Draught: 15 ft 3 in (4.65 m) (mean)
- Installed power: 25,000 shp (19,000 kW); 12 × Yarrow boilers
- Propulsion: 4 × shafts; 3 × steam turbines
- Speed: 25.5 kn (47.2 km/h; 29.3 mph)
- Complement: about 500
- Armament: 10 × single 5.5 in (140 mm) guns; 2 × single 3 pdr (47 mm (1.9 in)) AA guns; 2 × 21 in (533 mm) torpedo tubes
- Armour: Waterline belt: 2 in (51 mm) on 1 in (25 mm) plate; Deck: .375–1.5 in (9.5–38.1 mm); Conning Tower: 4 in (102 mm)

HMS Birkenhead was one of two Town-class light cruisers originally ordered for the Greek Navy in 1914. She was to be named Antinavarchos Kountouriotis after Vice Admiral Pavlos Kountouriotis. The order was placed with Cammell Laird and production continued for the Greek account after the outbreak of World War I in August 1914. In 1915, however, the two cruisers were purchased by the British government, and entered service with the Royal Navy.

== Design and description ==
Based on the Birmingham sub-class of the Towns, the two Greek ships primarily differed from their British half-sisters in their armament. The Greeks specified that they would use the new BL 5.5-inch (140 mm) Mk I gun built by the Coventry Ordnance Works. This weapon was significantly lighter than the standard 6-inch (152 mm) gun, which allowed the ships to mount ten guns, rather than the nine of the Birminghams, and fired an 85-pound (39 kg) shell rather than the 100-pound (45 kg) shell of the 6-inch weapon. It therefore had a higher rate of fire with little loss in hitting power. The Greeks also specified a secondary armament of two 12-pounder anti-aircraft guns, but these were still under development in 1915 and a pair of 3-pounder guns on high-angle mounts were substituted instead.

Birkenhead was 456 feet 6 inches (139.1 m) long overall, with a beam of 49 feet 10 inches (15.2 m) and a draught of 15 feet 3 inches (4.6 m). Displacement was 5,235 long tons (5,319 t) normal and 5,845 long tons (5,939 t) at full load. Twelve Yarrow boilers fed Birkenhead's Parsons steam turbines, driving four propeller shafts, that were rated at 25,000 shaft horsepower (19,000 kW) for a design speed of 25.5 knots (47.2 km/h; 29.3 mph). The boilers used both fuel oil and coal, with 1,070 long tons (1,087 t) of coal and 352 long tons (358 t) tons of oil carried.

Two of the 5.5-inch guns were mounted on the centreline fore and aft of the superstructure and the remaining eight guns were positioned on the broadside. All these guns were fitted with gun shields. Two Vickers 3-pounder (47 mm) anti-aircraft guns were also fitted. The armament was completed by two submerged 21-inch (533 mm) torpedo tubes.

== Service ==
The ship was laid down as Yard number 809 on 27 March 1914. Despite the outbreak of the First World War in August 1914, Greece continued to pay for the two cruisers, and construction continued for Greece, with Antinavarhos Kountoriotis being launched on 18 January 1915. However, with the war dragging on with no sign of a quick result, the Admiralty soon decided to purchase the two ships, with Antinavarhos Kountoriotis being renamed Birkenhead. She was completed in July 1915.

Like her sister, Chester, Birkenhead was assigned to the 3rd Light Cruiser Squadron of the Grand Fleet. On 26 September 1915, the accommodation ship Caribbean got into difficulties in heavy weather off Cape Wrath when on passage to Scapa Flow. On receipt of Caribbean's distress signals, Birkenhead set out from Scapa to assist, and together with several tugs and yachts, rescued all but 15 of Caribbean's crew before the accommodation ship sank on the next morning. Birkenhead continued her work-up and training before formally joining the 3rd Light Cruiser Squadron on 6 November. On 31 May to 1 June 1916, Birkenhead and Chester both took part in the Battle of Jutland. Birkenhead survived the battle, and the war and was sold for scrap on 26 October 1921 to Cashmore, of Newport.

== Bibliography ==
- Campbell, John (1986). Jutland: An Analysis of the Fighting. Naval Institute Press. ISBN 0-87021-324-5.
- Colledge, J. J.; Warlow, Ben & Bush, Steve (2020). Ships of the Royal Navy: The Complete Record of all Fighting Ships of the Royal Navy from the 15th Century to the Present (5th revised and updated ed.). Seaforth Publishing. ISBN 978-1-5267-9327-0.
- Corbett, Julian Stafford; Newbolt, Henry John (1997). Naval Operations. London: The Imperial War Museum. ISBN 978-0-89839-256-2.
- Corbett, Julian (1997) [1929]. Naval Operations. History of the Great War: Based on Official Documents. Vol. II (Second ed.). Imperial War Museum in association with the Battery Press. ISBN 1-870423-74-7.
- Friedman, Norman (2010). British Cruisers: Two World Wars and After. Seaforth. ISBN 978-1-59114-078-8.
- Jellicoe, John (1919). The Grand Fleet 1914–16: Its Creation, Development and Work. Cassell and Company, Ltd. OCLC 56258407.
- Lyon, David (1977). "The First Town Class 1908–31: Part 1". Warship. 1 (1). Conway Maritime Press: 48–58. ISBN 0-85177-132-7.
- Lyon, David (1977). "The First Town Class 1908–31: Part 2". Warship. 1 (2). Conway Maritime Press: 54–61. ISBN 0-85177-132-7.
- Lyon, David (1977). "The First Town Class 1908–31: Part 3". Warship. 1 (3). Conway Maritime Press: 46–51. ISBN 0-85177-132-7.
- Newbolt, Henry (1996) [1931]. Naval Operations. History of the Great War Based on Official Documents. Vol. V. Battery Press. ISBN 0-89839-255-1.
- Preston, Antony (1985). "Great Britain and Empire Forces". In Gray, Randal (ed.). Conway's All the World's Fighting Ships 1906–1921. Naval Institute Press. pp. 1–104. ISBN 0-85177-245-5.
