= Kidnap and ransom insurance =

Type of insurance

Kidnap and ransom insurance or K&R insurance is designed to protect individuals and corporations operating in high-risk areas around the world. Locations most often named in policies include Mexico, Venezuela, Haiti, and Nigeria, certain other countries in Latin America, as well as some parts of the Russian Federation and Eastern Europe. Central Asia is also seeing increasing numbers of incidents, particularly in Afghanistan and Iraq.

== Coverage ==
Losses typically reimbursed by K&R insurance include:

- Ransom monies – Money paid or lost due to kidnapping
- Transit/delivery – Loss due to destruction, disappearance, confiscation, or wrongful appropriation of ransom monies being delivered to a covered kidnapping or extortion
- Accidental death or dismemberment – Death or permanent physical disablement occurring during a kidnapping
- Judgements and legal liability – Cost resulting from any claim or suit brought by any insured person against the insured
- Additional expenses – Medical care, severe disruption of operations, potential damage to company brand, PR counsel, wage and salary replacement, relocation and job retraining, and other expenses related to a kidnapping incident.

The policies also typically pay for the fees and expenses of crisis management consultants. These consultants provide advice to the insured on how to best respond to the incident. Even the most basic training for people traveling to dangerous places is not easily provided or is not obtained by small to mid-sized companies.

=== Intended audience ===
The policies may be written to cover high-profile companies, non-governmental organizations, C-Suite level executives or similar strategic individuals, or individuals who represent local or multinational organizations. Some policies include kidnap prevention training.

=== Underwriting considerations ===
The major factors insurance underwriters weigh when considering a kidnap and ransom policy include the country of residence for the insured, the type of industry of the insured, revenue of the insured, and the travel patterns of any employees who may be covered by the policy.

== Problems ==
One of the known paradoxes of K&R policies is that those who have them are often not aware, as it can be provided by an employer hoping to protect the company's assets. It is believed that an employee with knowledge of his K&R policy might begin to act differently, or even collude in his own kidnap for fraudulent purposes.

In 2010, criminal gangs were believed to make $500 million a year from kidnap and ransom payments.

== See also ==
- Sklavenkasse
- War risk insurance
- Travel insurance
