= Pidyon shvuyim =

Religious duty in Judaism to redeem captive Jews

Pidyon shevuyim (Hebrew: פִּדְיוֹן שְׁבוּיִים, romanized: piḏyon šəvuyim, literally: Redemption of Captives) is a religious duty in Judaism to bring about the release of a fellow Jew captured by slave dealers or robbers, or imprisoned unjustly. Reconciliation, ransom negotiations, or unrelenting pursuit typically secured the release of the captive. It is considered an essential commandment in halakha (Jewish law).

== Sources ==
The Talmud calls pidyon shevuyim a mitzvah rabba ("great mitzva"), as captivity is viewed as even worse than starvation and death according to Bava Batra 8b.

Maimonides wrote,

The redeeming of captives takes precedence over supporting the poor or clothing them. There is no greater mitzvah than redeeming captives for the problems of the captive include being hungry, thirsty, unclothed, and they are in danger of their lives too. Ignoring the need to redeem captives goes against these Torah laws: “Do not harden your heart or shut your hand against your needy fellow” (Devarim 15:7); “Do not stand idly by while your neighbor’s blood is shed” (Vayikra 19:16). And misses out on the following mitzvot: “You must surely open your hand to him or her” (Devarim 15:8); “...Love your neighbor as yourself” (Vayikra 19:18); “Rescue those who are drawn to death” (Proverbs 24:11) and "... there is no mitzvah greater than the redeeming of captives.” (Maimonides, Mishneh Torah, Hilchot Matanot Aniyim 8:10-11)

The Shulchan Aruch adds, "Every moment that one delays in freeing captives, in cases where it is possible to expedite their freedom, is considered to be tantamount to murder.” (Shulchan Aruch, Yoreh De'ah 252:3)

A fund was kept in the Temple to pay for the redemption of captives.

== Limitations in the practice of the mitzva ==
Despite the importance of the mitzva, it should be performed within several boundaries, the most significant of which is:

“One does not ransom captives for more than their value because of tikkun olam (literally: “fixing the world”; for the good order of the world; as a precaution for the general good) and one does not help captives escape because of Tikkun Olam." (Mishna, Gittin 4:6)

One of the aims of this restriction is to avoid encouraging kidnappers, or those seeking financial gain by capturing Jews and demanding a kofer (ransom) in exchange, due to the knowledge of how sensitive Jews are to rescuing their prisoners at any price. There are certain instances in which this restriction does not apply, such as when a man wishes to pay an excessive sum for his freedom, or when the prisoner is a Talmid Chacham, or when a husband is attempting to earn the freedom of his wife (Shulchan Aruch, Yoreh De'ah 252:4).

A prominent example of the practice of this restriction in reality was the affair of the arrest of Meir of Rothenburg, a gadol of Ashkenazi Judaism in the 13th century, who is said to have forbidden his release from prison citing this restriction, even though according to halakha, it was permitted to pay a substantial sum for his release.

Another restriction is that if a person repeatedly causes his capture time after time, a pidyon is no longer required after the third time. This refers to a situation in which a person has sold himself or been taken to prison for a crime committed intentionally. This restriction only applies when the life of the captive is not in danger; if his captors desire to kill him, a pidyon is mandatory.

The question of pidyon shevuyim, and particularly the amount of ransom to be paid, is a controversial issue in Israel, how captive Israeli soldiers are to be liberated or exchanged.

== See also ==
- Babylonian captivity
- Elharar
- Hostage diplomacy
- Gaza war hostage crisis
- Migration diplomacy
- Prisoner of Zion
- Refusenik
- Selling of Jews by Romania
- Sklavenkasse
- Khmelnytsky pogroms
