= Skansin =

Historic fortress in Tórshavn, Faroe Islands

Coordinates: 62°00′29″N 6°45′47″W

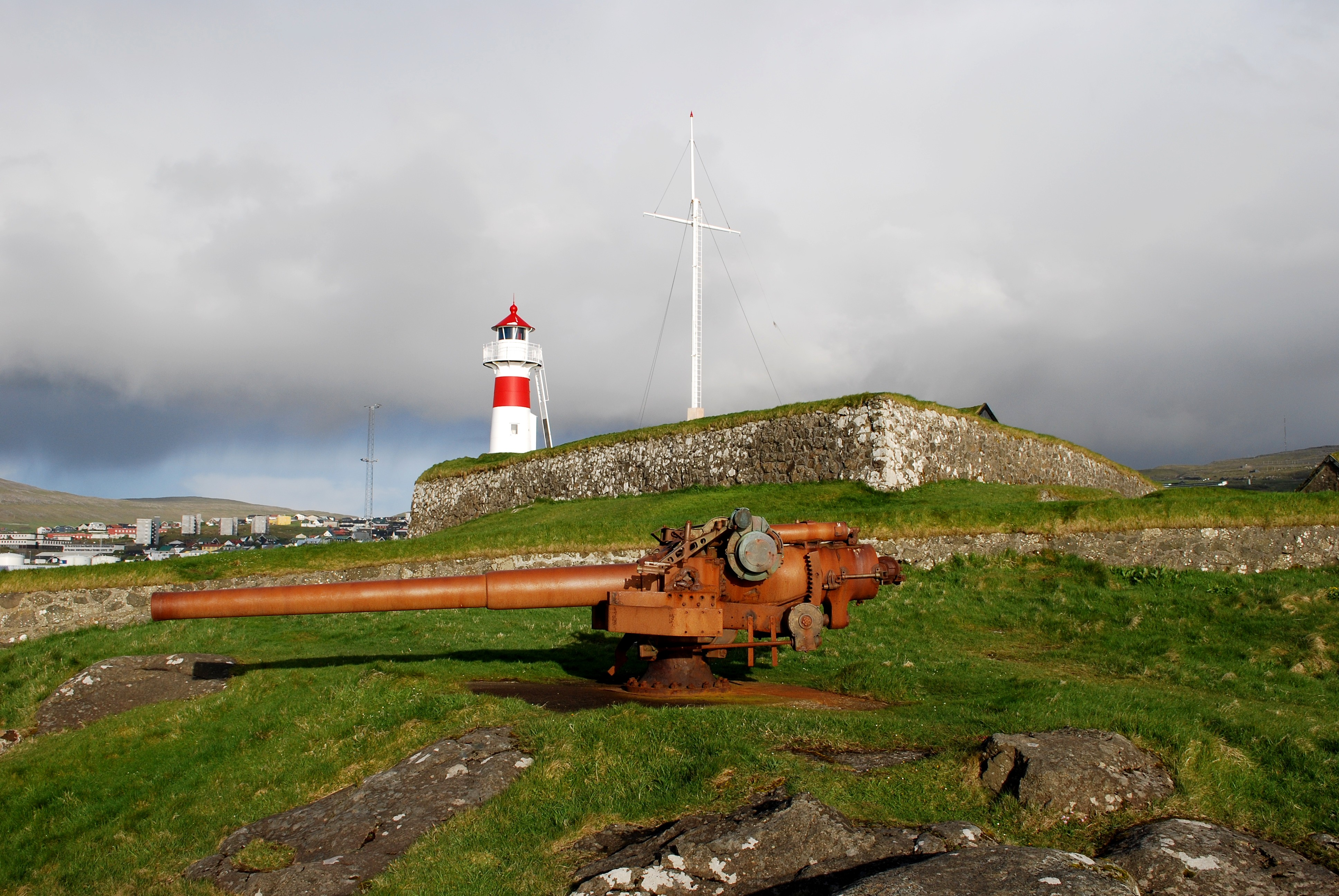
Skansin lighthouse is visible in the background. In the foreground is a British gun from the warship HMS Furious, installed during the Second World War.

Skansin is a historic fortress in Tórshavn, the capital of the Faroe Islands.

Skansin is located on a hill beside the port of Tórshavn. The fort was built in 1580 by Magnus Heinason to protect against pirate/slave raids of the town, after he himself was nearly caught up in one such raid. The fort was expanded considerably in 1780 and went through a series of rebuilds for many years afterwards.

During the Second World War the fort served Britain as a military base after the British occupation of the Faroe Islands in April 1940. Two 5.5 inch guns date from the British occupation, standing along with many older Danish cannon.

One of the Faroese lighthouses, the Skansin Lighthouse (Skansin international lighthouse), towers over the fortress, pointing the way to the capital. The strategic location of the fort offers views of Tórshavn port, surrounding landscape and views out towards Nólsoy island.

== Gallery ==
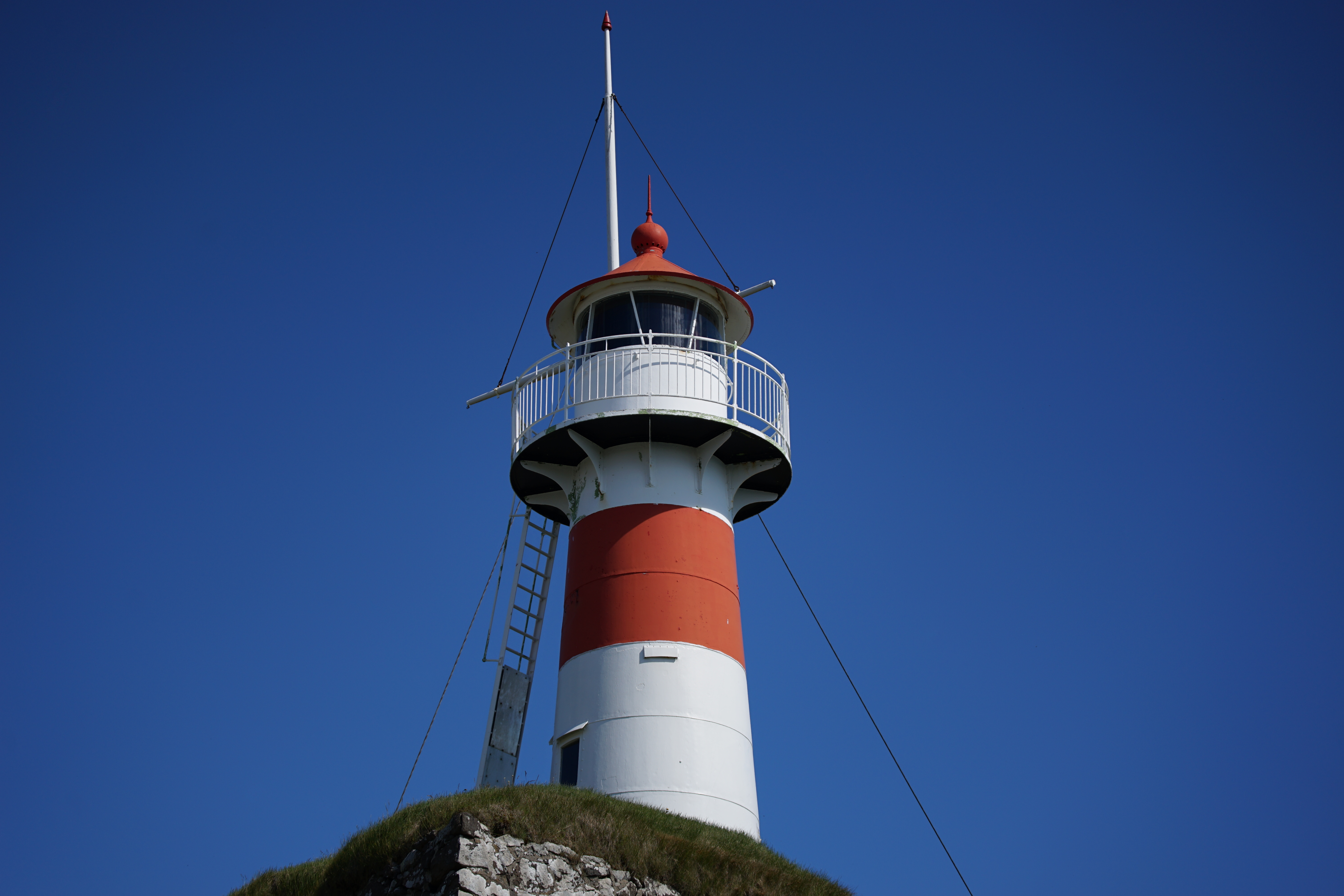
Skansin lighthouse

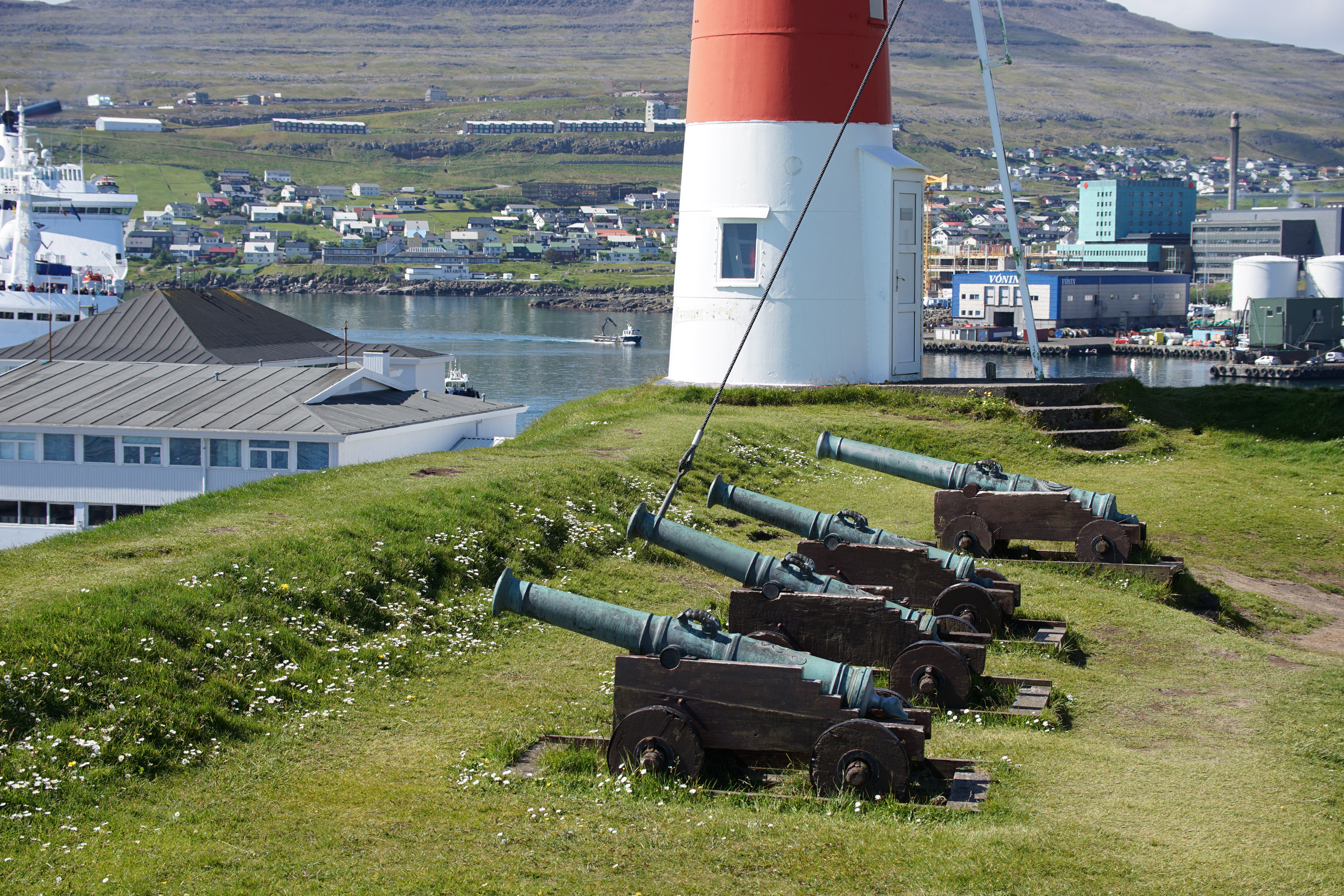
Old cannons at Skansin

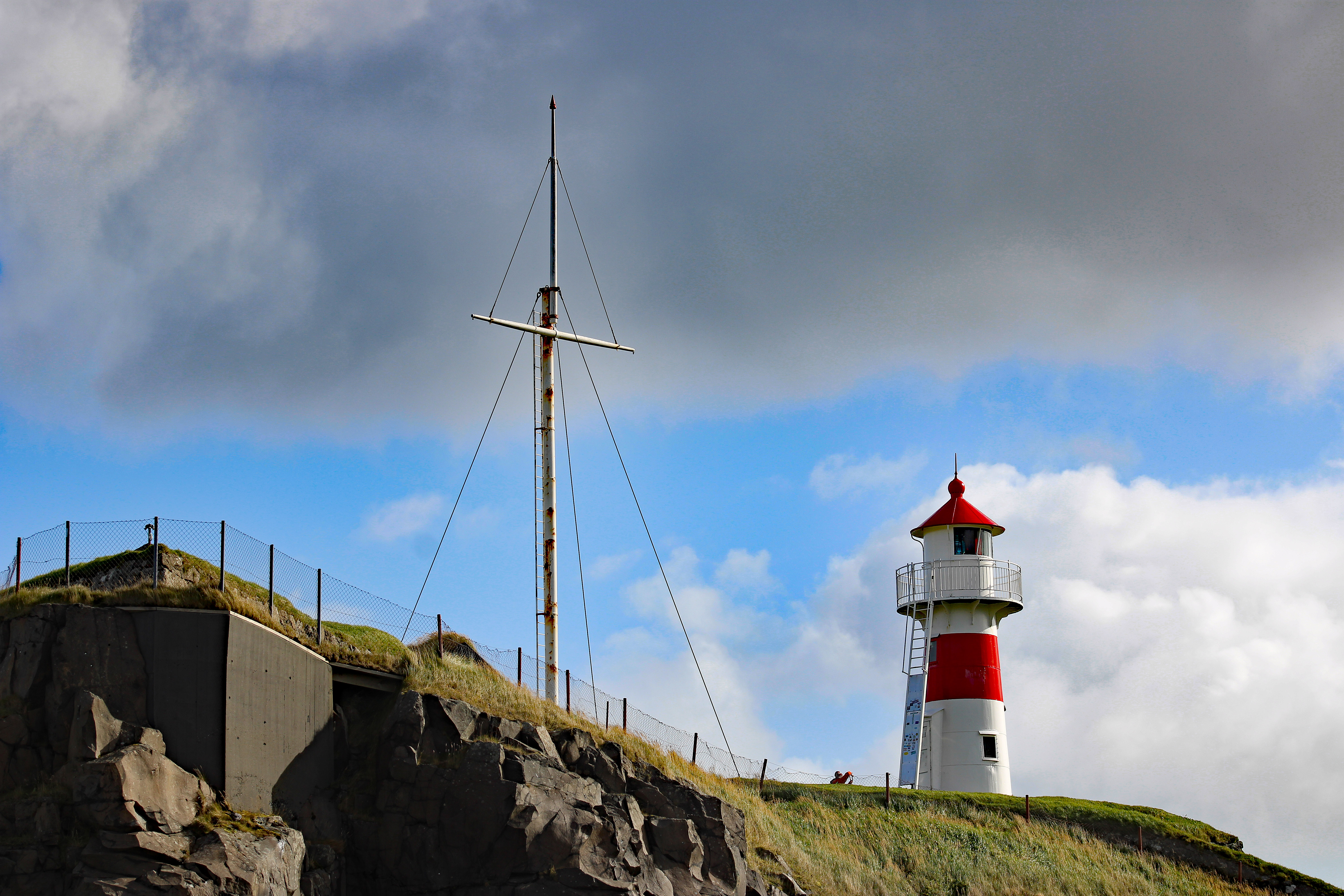
Skansin lighthouse and fort as seen in September 2024

== See also ==
- British occupation of the Faroe Islands
- Slave raid of Suðuroy
