= Tinganes =

Historic location of the Faroese landsstýri (government)

Coordinates: 62.009°N 6.770°W

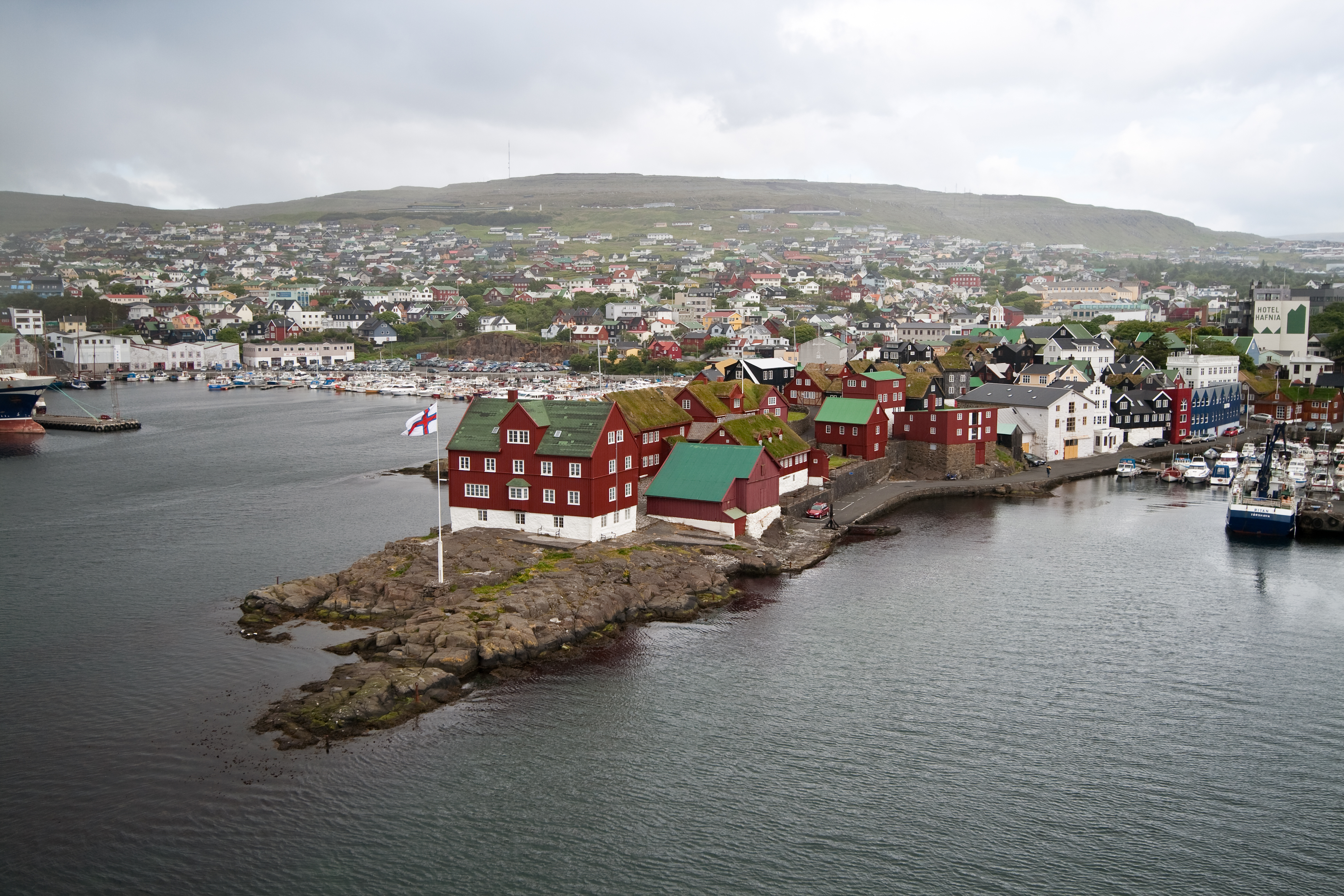
Tinganes showing government buildings

Tinganes is the historic location of the landsstýri (government) of the Faroe Islands, and is a part of Tórshavn. The name means "parliament jetty" or "parliament point" in Faroese.

The parliament met there for the first time in the Viking ages when Norwegian colonists placed their Ting (parliament) on the location in 825. It is one of the oldest parliamentary meeting places in the world, along with Tynwald hill on the Isle of Man and Þingvellir in Iceland. The Løgting has since moved to the north of the city, but the home-rule government still sits here.

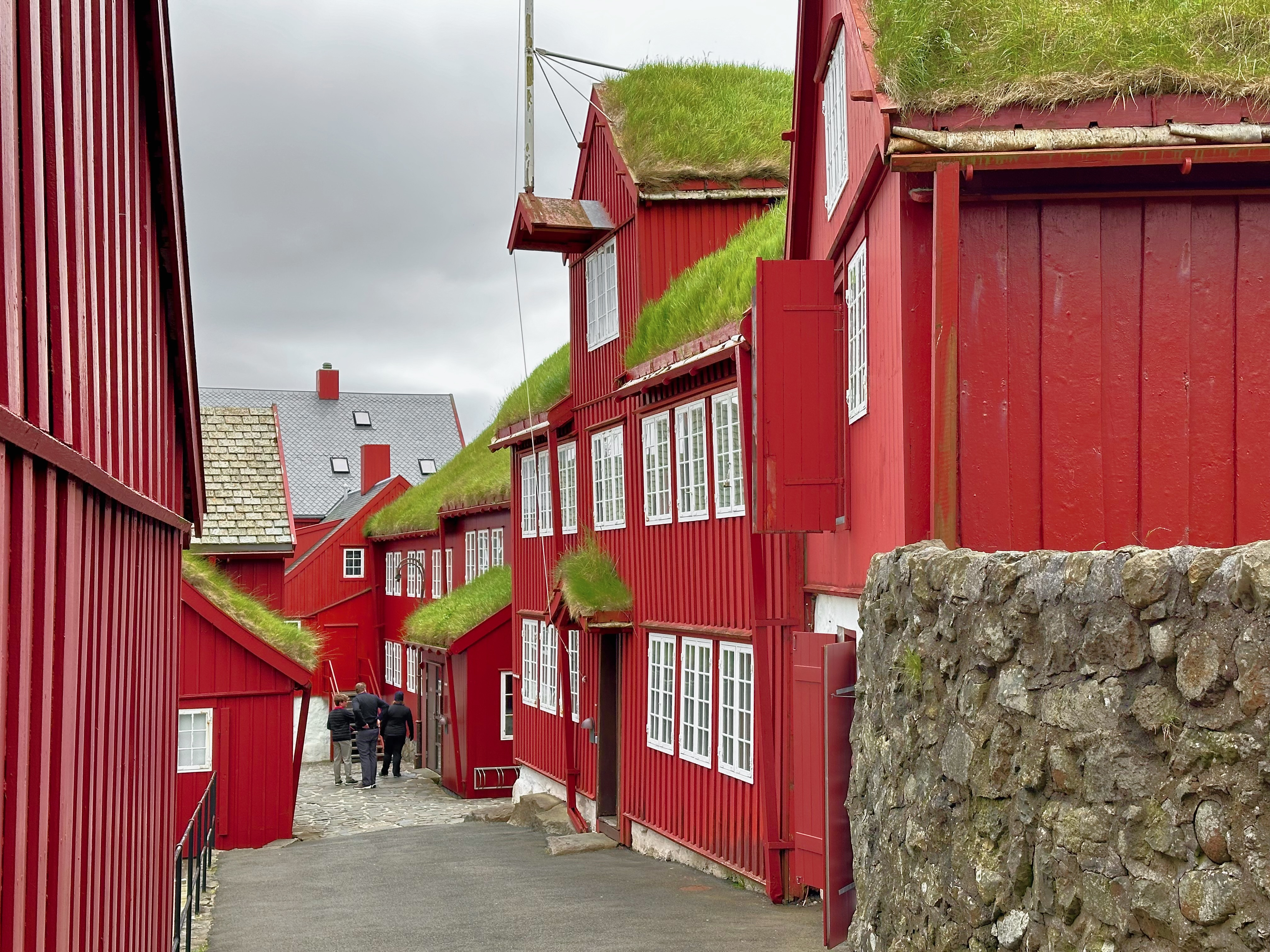
Sod roofs on a street on Tinganes. These buildings are the old parliament buildings.

The building on the outermost point on the small peninsula of Skansapakkhusið is currently the government's main building. The small main street on the peninsula is called Gongin and is home to the oldest parts of the city. Many of the houses on Tinganes were built in the 16th and 17th centuries and are still in use today.

The peninsula divides the Tórshavn harbour in two parts, Eystaravág and Vesteravág.
