= Tórshavn =

Capital and largest city of the Faroe Islands

Tórshavn Thorshavn
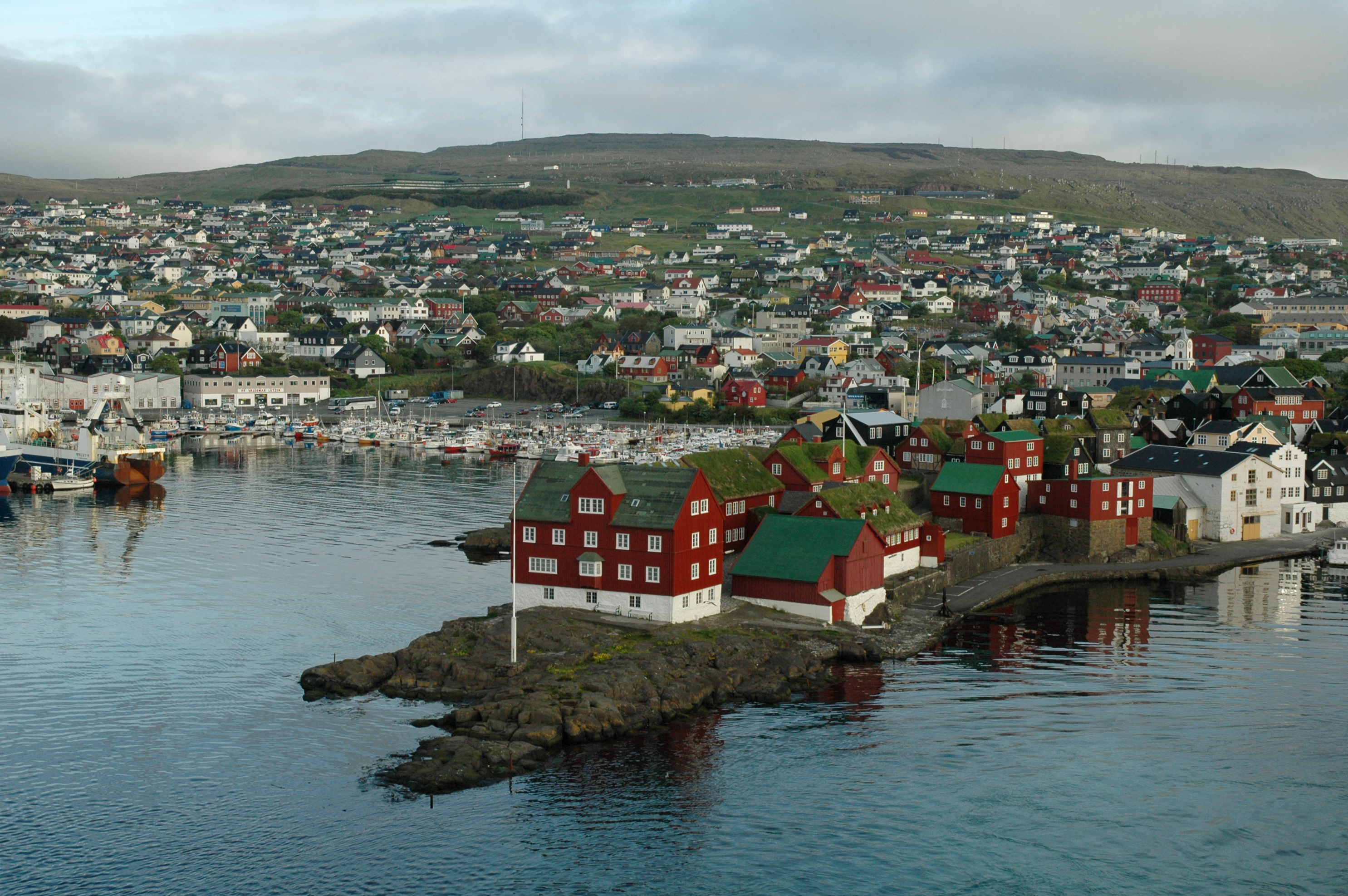
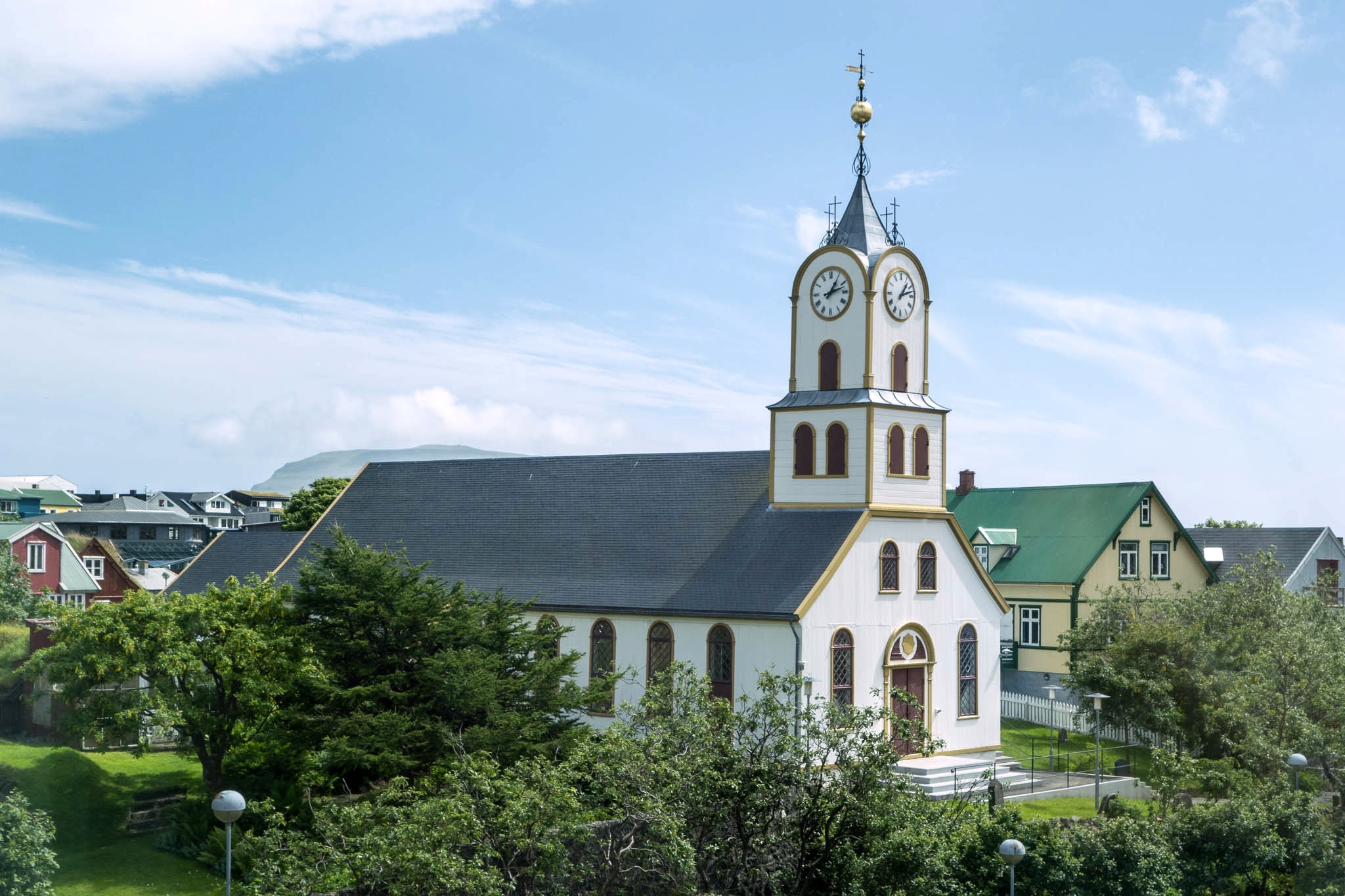
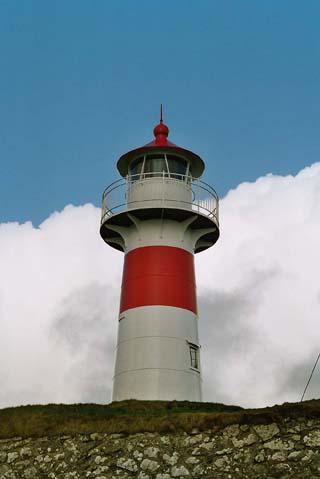
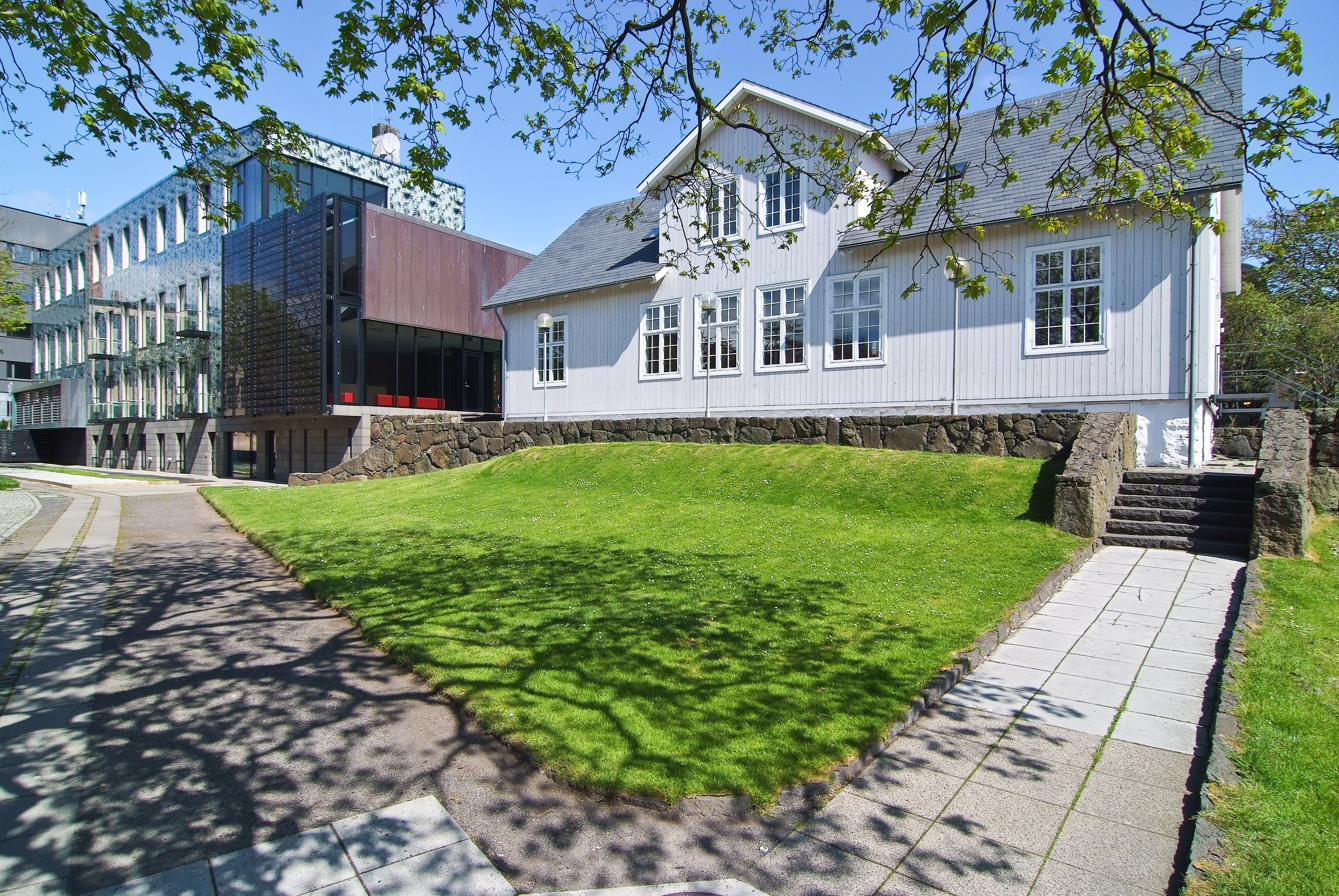
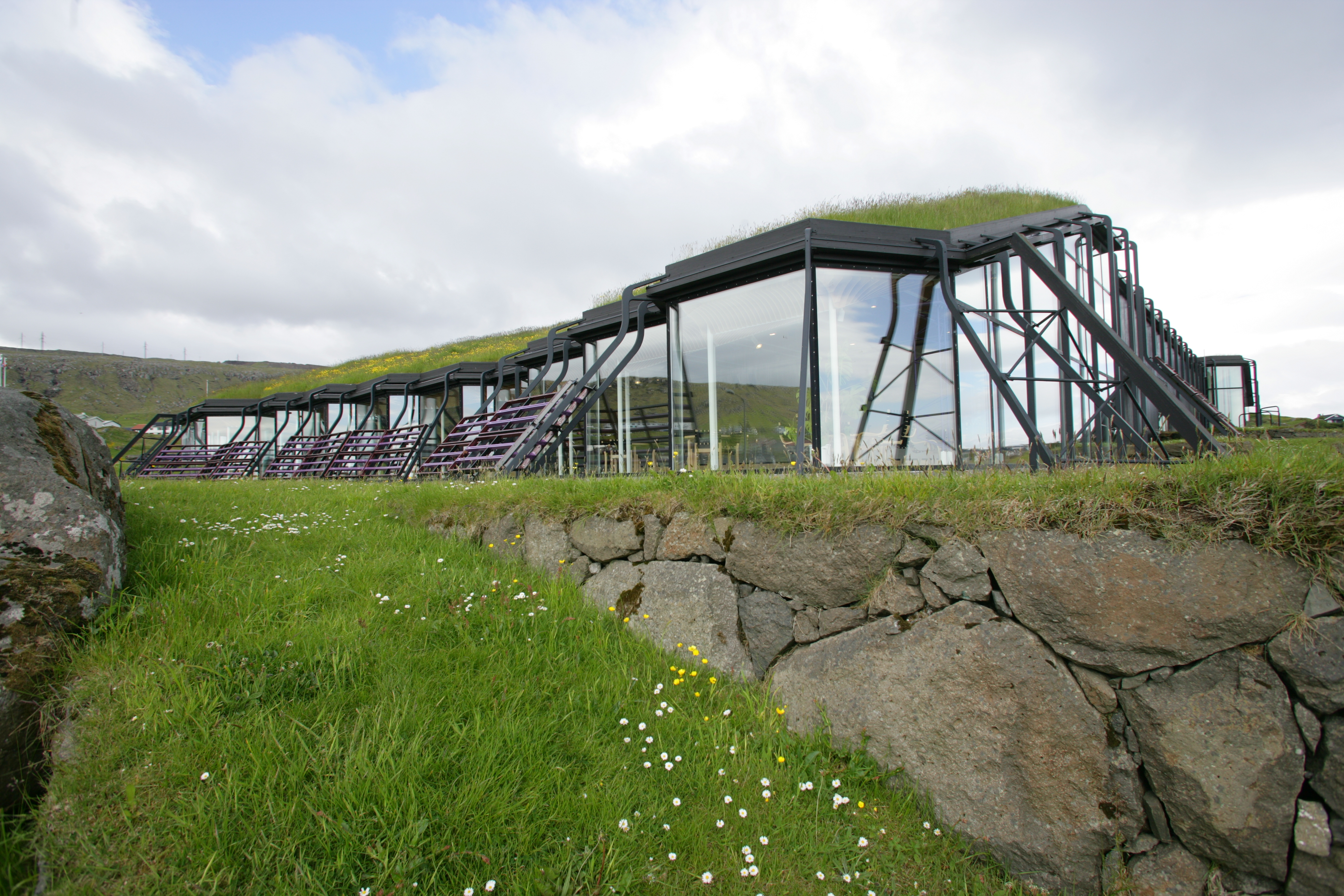
- Tinganes Tórshavn Cathedral Skansin lighthouse Løgting house Nordic House

- Flag Seal Coat of arms
- Nickname: Havn
- Interactive map of Tórshavn
- Location within Denmark Faroe Islands Location within Europe
- Coordinates: 62°0′42″N 6°46′3″W
- State: Kingdom of Denmark
- Constituent Country: Faroe Islands
- Municipality: Tórshavn Municipality
- Founded: 9th century
- Town rights: 1909

Government
  - Mayor: Elsa Berg (Tjóðveldi)
- Elevation: 24 m (79 ft)

Population (January 2024)
  - City: 14,223
  - Urban: 22,444
- Time zone: UTC±00:00 (WET)
  - Summer (DST): UTC+01:00 (WEST)
- Postal code: FO-100, FO-110
- Climate: Cfc
- Website: www.torshavn.fo

Tórshavn (Faroese: [ˈtʰɔu̯ʂhau̯n]; lit. 'Thor's harbour'; Danish: Thorshavn), locally referred to as Havn, is the capital and largest city of the Faroe Islands. It is located in the southern part on the east coast of Streymoy. To the northwest of the city lies the 347-metre-high (1,138 ft) mountain Húsareyn, and to the southwest, the 350-metre-high (1,150 ft) Kirkjubøreyn. They are separated by the Sandá River. The city itself has a population of 14,223 (2024), and the greater urban area has a population of 22,444, including the suburbs of Hoyvík and Argir.

The Norse (Scandinavians) established their parliament on the Tinganes peninsula in AD 850. Tórshavn thus became the capital of the Faroe Islands and has remained so ever since. Early on, Tórshavn became the centre of the islands' trade monopoly, thereby being the only legal place for the islanders to sell and buy goods. In 1856, the trade monopoly was abolished and the islands were left open to free trade.

== History ==
=== Early history ===
The Viking settlers in the 9th century established their own parliaments, called tings, in different parts of the islands, it being the tradition in each case to hold the ting at a neutral and thus uninhabited place, so no one location gave anyone an advantage. According to romantics, the main ting for the islands was convoked in Tórshavn in 825, on Tinganes, the peninsula that divides the harbour into two parts: Eystaravág and Vestaravág.

The settlers would thus meet on the flat rocks of Tinganes every summer, as the most central place on the islands, although there was no settlement at Tinganes at that time. The Færeyinga Saga says: "the place of the ting of the Faroese was on Streymoy, and there is the harbour that is called Tórshavn". The Viking age ended in 1035. The ting was followed by a market which gradually grew into a permanent trading area.

All through the Middle Ages, the narrow peninsula jutting out into the sea made up the main part of Tórshavn. It belonged to the outfield of two farmers. Unlike other Faroese villages, Tórshavn was never a distinct farming community. During the 12th century, all trade between Norway and the Faroes, along with other tributary islands to the west, became centralised in Bergen.

In 1271, a royal trade monopoly was established in Tórshavn by the Norwegian Crown. According to a document from 1271, two ships would sail regularly to Tórshavn from Bergen with cargoes of salt, timber and cereal. Tórshavn therefore had more contact with the outside world than the other villages did. Under the Norwegian, and then Danish rule, government officials made Tórshavn their home. All of these things, combined with the fact that Tórshavn was the seat of the ting of the islands, influenced the town's development.

=== 1500–1800 ===
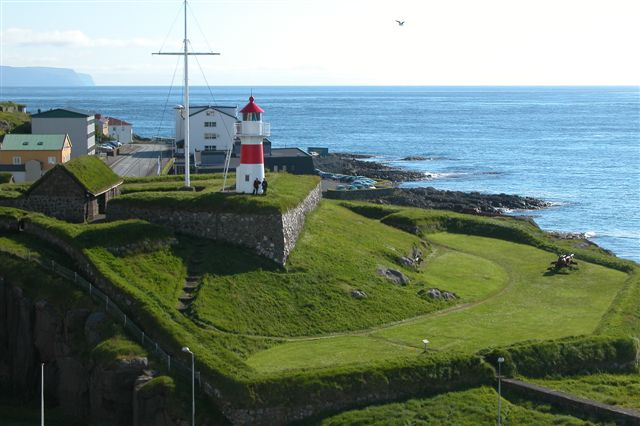
Skansin fort has been rebuilt several times since it was first built in 1580. The current building dates back to 1790

Sources do not mention a built-up area in Tórshavn until after the Protestant reformation in 1539. In c. 1580 a small fort, Skansin, was built by the Faroese naval hero and trader Magnus Heinason at the north end of the harbour. Later, small fortifications were built at Tinganes.

In 1584, Tórshavn had 101 inhabitants. The population was divided into three equally large groups made up of farmers, their families and servants, trade and government officials and people who owned no land and therefore not much else; this included the landless proletariat from the villages that during this period came to Tórshavn in search of work. They were set to guard duty on Skansin without pay, and for clothing and food they depended on the bounty of the farmers.

In 1655, king Frederick III of Denmark granted the Faroe Islands to his favourite statesman Kristoffer Gabel; the rule of the von Gabel Family (lasting between 1655 and 1709), is known as Gablatíðin. It is the darkest chapter in the history of Tórshavn. Gabel's administration suppressed the islanders in various ways. The trade monopoly was in the family's hands and it was not designed for the needs of the Faroese people. People across the country brought products into town and had to be satisfied with whatever price they were given. At the same time, imported goods were limited and expensive. There came considerable complaints from the islands' inhabitants of unjust treatment by the civil administration in Tórshavn. These not only included the persons in charge of the monopoly trade, but also the bailiff and others. It was during this period, in 1673, that Tinganes was ravaged by a fire after a store of gunpowder kept at Tinganes had blown up. Many old houses burnt to the ground and old Faroese records were lost as were Gabel's documents.

Conditions improved in Tórshavn when the trade monopoly became a royal monopoly in 1709. The Danish royal trade monopoly was supplied with goods from Copenhagen three times a year. However, Tórshavn was hit by a plague of smallpox in 1709, killing nearly the entire population. The town had dissipated reached a population of 300 before the outbreak; 250 of the inhabitants died from the disease. Still, it was during the latter half of the 18th century that Tórshavn started to develop into a small town. This was while Niels Ryberg was in charge of the trade monopoly. From 1768 (and during the next 20 years onwards) Ryberg was allowed to carry on an entrepot trade which was mainly based on smuggling to England. Because of the French-British conflict there was room for this kind of operation. In Tórshavn his warehouses filled up with goods. Ryberg was the first person who thought of making a financial profit from fishing, which later became the most important economic factor to the islands. He experimented with salted cod and herring but at this point in time nothing much beyond this happened.

Tórshavn Cathedral was first built in 1788 and partly rebuilt in 1865. Since 1990, it has been the seat of the Bishop of the Faroe Islands (in the Church of the Faroe Islands).

=== 1800–present ===
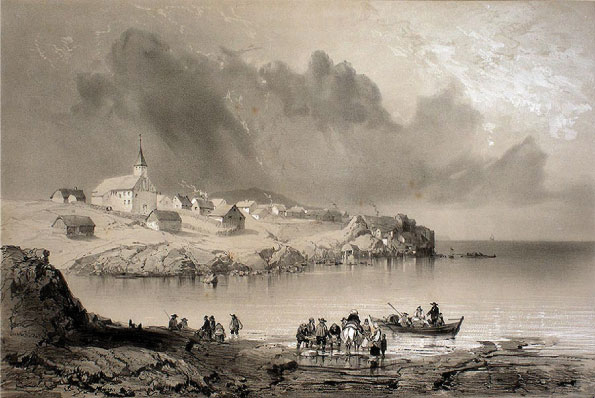
Tórshavn in 1839, by Barthélemy Lauvergne

On 30 March 1808, during the Anglo-Danish Gunboat War, the Cruizer-class brig-sloop HMS Clio entered Tórshavn and briefly captured the fort at Skansin. The fort surrendered without firing a shot as the landing party approached. The Clio's men spiked the fort's eight 18-pounder guns and took all the smaller guns and weapons before leaving. Shortly after 6 May, a German privateer who had assumed the name "Baron von Hompesch" plundered the defenceless city and seized the property of the Danish Crown Monopoly. The Admiralty Prize Court, however, refused to condemn it as a lawful prize.

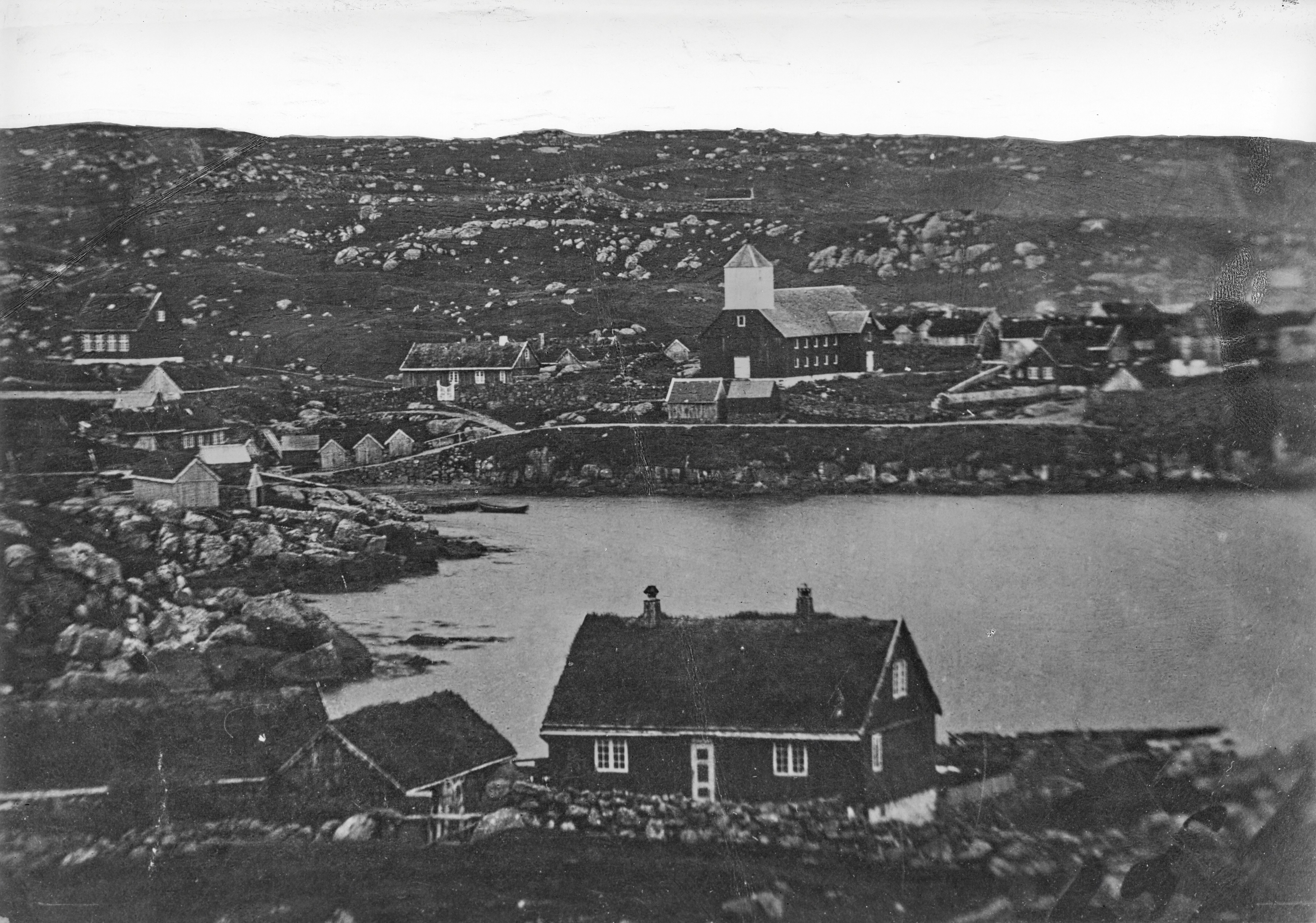
Tórshavn in 1864, the Løgting (parliament) is at top left

In 1856, free trade came to the Faroe Islands. By opening the islands to the world, it transformed the economy, with Tórshavn at its centre.

In 1866, Tórshavn's town council was founded. The town has been the capital of the Faroe Islands ever since. Later, in 1909, Tórshavn became a market town with the same municipal charter as Danish market towns. In 1913, the Danish Folketing granted DKK 810,000 to construction of a harbour in Tórshavn. Local waves are 3 m (9.8 ft), the waters are ice free and have a tidal variation of 0.3 m (1 ft 0 in), and storms from the west are mitigated by the gentle eastwards slope of the mountains. Other harbours were also benefitted with an 80% grant to a total build cost of DKK 1.6 million. In 1927, Tórshavn had a modern harbour built. This made it possible for larger ships to berth.

During the British occupation of the Faroe Islands in World War II, Skansin was used as the headquarters of the Royal Navy Command, and two 5.5-inch guns used aboard HMS Furious before World War II were deployed.

In 1974, the neighbouring villages Hoyvík and Hvítanes were made part of the town area. Later, even more municipalities joined the Tórshavn municipality. In 1978 Kaldbak, in 1997 Argir, in 2001 Kollafjørður, and finally in 2005, Kirkjubøur, Hestur, and Nólsoy.

== Climate ==
Tórshavn, Faroe Islands

Climate chart (precipitation, max. and min. temperature)
J	F	M	A	M	J	J	A	S	O	N	D
165 6 2	128 6 2	128 6 2	91 8 3	68 9 5	62 11 7	70 13 9	92 13 9	116 12 8	145 10 6	152 8 4	154 7 2
- █ Average max. and min. temperatures in °C
- █ Precipitation totals in mm
- Source: Danish Meteorological Institute
Imperial conversion
J	F	M	A	M	J	J	A	S	O	N	D
6.5 43 36	5 43 35	5 44 36	3.6 46 38	2.7 49 41	2.5 52 45	2.8 55 48	3.6 56 49	4.6 53 47	5.7 49 42	6 46 38	6.1 44 36
- █ Average max. and min. temperatures in °F
- █ Precipitation totals in inches

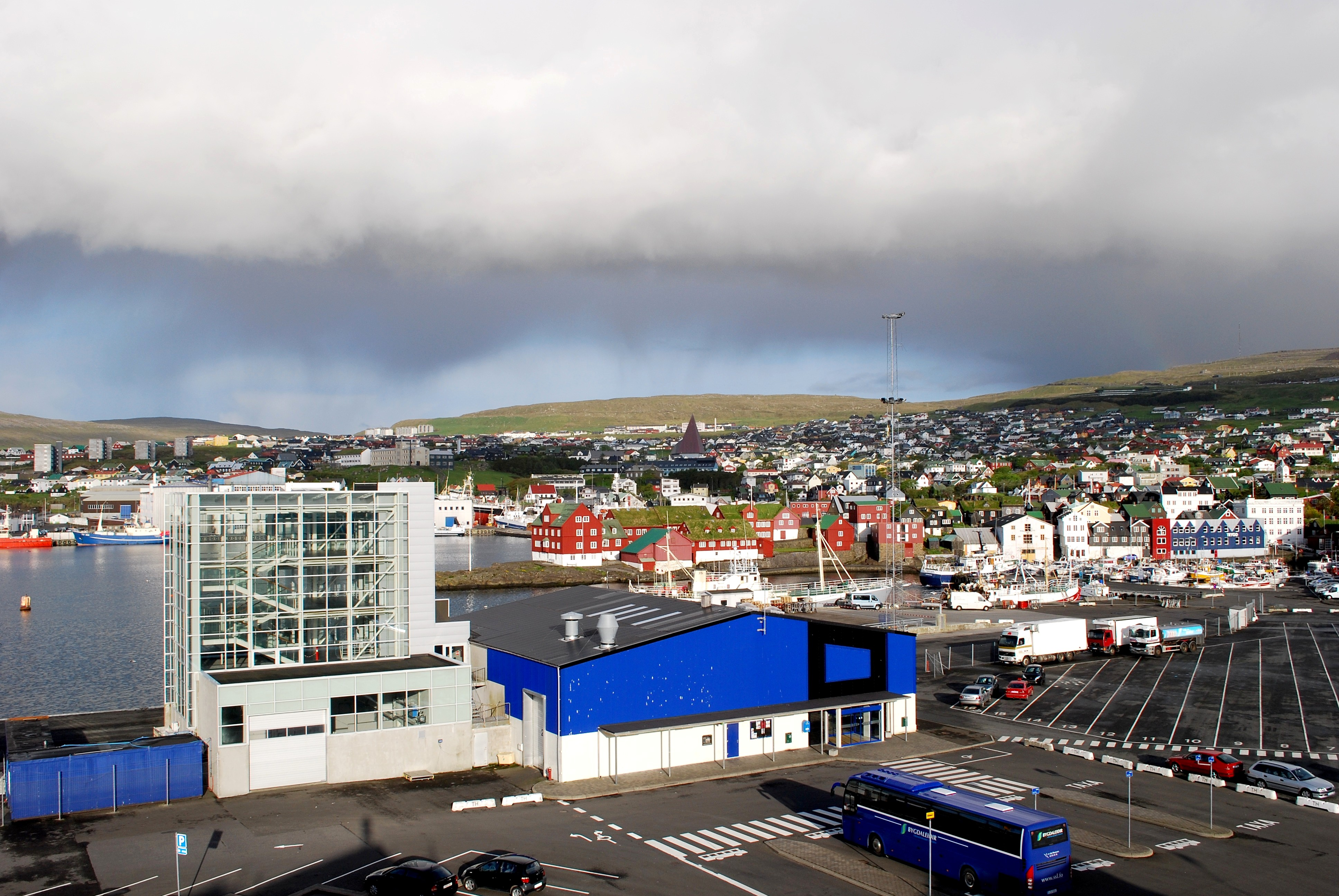
Tórshavn Harbour Ferry Terminal, view towards Tinganes and 'Vesturbýur' The Western Town

Tórshavn has a subpolar oceanic climate (Köppen: Cfc, Trewartha: Eolk), with strong moderation from the Atlantic Ocean's Norwegian Current. In winter, Tórshavn tends to be under direct influence of the Icelandic Low, which usually brings overcast and stormy weather to the Faroe Islands. Because of its cloudiness and the ice-free water surrounding Tórshavn, its winter temperatures are exceptionally mild for such a northerly location, with winter daytime temperatures usually oscillating around 6 °C (43 °F). However, summer temperatures are much lower than those found in Scandinavia on similar latitudes, and barely exceed 13 °C (55 °F) daily highs in the warmest month. The moderation also causes the extremes amplitude to be very low: in the period from 1961 to 2021, there was a mere 33 °C (59 °F) difference between the absolute warmest and coldest temperatures. Temperatures below freezing may occur in any non-summer month, but even in winter, the average daily lows stay well above 0 °C (32 °F).

Average monthly precipitation is highest in autumn and winter, peaking in January, due to the activity of the Icelandic Low. May, June and July, on the other hand, are markedly drier but still receive substantial rainfall.

Climate data for Tórshavn (1991–2020, extremes 1961–present)
Month	Jan	Feb	Mar	Apr	May	Jun	Jul	Aug	Sep	Oct	Nov	Dec	Year
Record high °C (°F)	11.6 (52.9)	13.0 (55.4)	12.3 (54.1)	18.3 (64.9)	19.7 (67.5)	20.0 (68.0)	20.2 (68.4)	22.0 (71.6)	19.5 (67.1)	16.3 (61.3)	15.6 (60.1)	13.2 (55.8)	22.0 (71.6)
Mean daily maximum °C (°F)	6.2 (43.2)	6.0 (42.8)	6.4 (43.5)	7.6 (45.7)	9.3 (48.7)	11.3 (52.3)	12.9 (55.2)	13.3 (55.9)	11.9 (53.4)	9.6 (49.3)	7.6 (45.7)	6.5 (43.7)	9.0 (48.2)
Daily mean °C (°F)	4.3 (39.7)	4.0 (39.2)	4.3 (39.7)	5.5 (41.9)	7.1 (44.8)	9.1 (48.4)	10.8 (51.4)	11.2 (52.2)	10.0 (50.0)	7.8 (46.0)	5.8 (42.4)	4.5 (40.1)	7.0 (44.6)
Mean daily minimum °C (°F)	2.1 (35.8)	1.6 (34.9)	2.0 (35.6)	3.2 (37.8)	5.0 (41.0)	7.3 (45.1)	9.1 (48.4)	9.3 (48.7)	8.1 (46.6)	5.7 (42.3)	3.6 (38.5)	2.2 (36.0)	4.9 (40.8)
Record low °C (°F)	−8.8 (16.2)	−11.0 (12.2)	−9.2 (15.4)	−9.9 (14.2)	−3.0 (26.6)	0.0 (32.0)	1.5 (34.7)	1.5 (34.7)	−0.6 (30.9)	−4.5 (23.9)	−7.2 (19.0)	−10.5 (13.1)	−11.0 (12.2)
Average precipitation mm (inches)	167.3 (6.59)	131.2 (5.17)	129.5 (5.10)	95.4 (3.76)	70.3 (2.77)	63.1 (2.48)	71.2 (2.80)	93.4 (3.68)	118.1 (4.65)	146.8 (5.78)	155.2 (6.11)	157.7 (6.21)	1,399.2 (55.1)
Average precipitation days (≥ 1 mm)	20.7	17.3	18.9	14.7	12.2	9.2	11.0	12.9	15.9	19.0	19.8	20.4	192
Average snowy days	8.3	6.6	8.0	4.4	1.5	0.0	0.0	0.0	0.1	1.4	5.5	8.2	44.0
Average relative humidity (%)	89	88	88	87	87	88	89	90	89	89	88	89	88
Mean monthly sunshine hours	29.8	53.0	91.5	116.2	157.8	135.4	106.9	101.6	88.9	59.7	38.6	22.7	1,002.1
Source: Danish Meteorological Institute (humidity 1961–1990, snowy days 1961–1990, sun 2007-2020), infoclimat.fr (record high)

Coastal temperature data for Tórshavn
Month	Jan	Feb	Mar	Apr	May	Jun	Jul	Aug	Sep	Oct	Nov	Dec	Year
Average sea temperature °C (°F)	7.0 (44.60)	6.6 (43.88)	6.8 (44.24)	7.0 (44.60)	7.6 (45.68)	8.5 (47.30)	9.8 (49.64)	10.5 (50.90)	10.4 (50.72)	9.8 (49.64)	8.8 (47.84)	8.0 (46.40)	8.4 (47.12)
Source 1: Seatemperature.net

== Politics and government ==
Tórshavn is the capital of the Faroe Islands, and as such is the seat of the Faroes’ self-rule government. The government holds the executive power in local government affairs. Today a part of the government is located on the Tinganes peninsula of Tórshavn. The Prime Minister's office is there and the Ministry of Internal Affairs was also there until it was closed in 2013. The other ministries are located in other office buildings in various places in Tórshavn, i.e. the Ministry of Health and the Ministry of Social Affairs are located near the Hospital of the Faroes in Eirargarður, and the Ministry of Finance is located in Argir in a building called Albert Hall on the street Kvíggjartún. The parliament, the Løgting, which was originally located on Tinganes, was relocated to the town square, Vaglið, in 1856.

=== Mayors of Tórshavn ===
Nº	Mayor (Party)	Term
1.	Poul Michelsen (A)	1980-1991
2.	Lisbeth L. Petersen (B)	1991-1997
3.	Leivur Hansen (E)	1997-2001
4.	Jan Christiansen (A)	2001-2005
5.	Heðin Mortensen (C)	2005-2016
6.	Annika Olsen (A)	2016-2020
7.	Heðin Mortensen (C)	2020-2024
8.	Elsa Berg (E)	2024-

== Sport ==
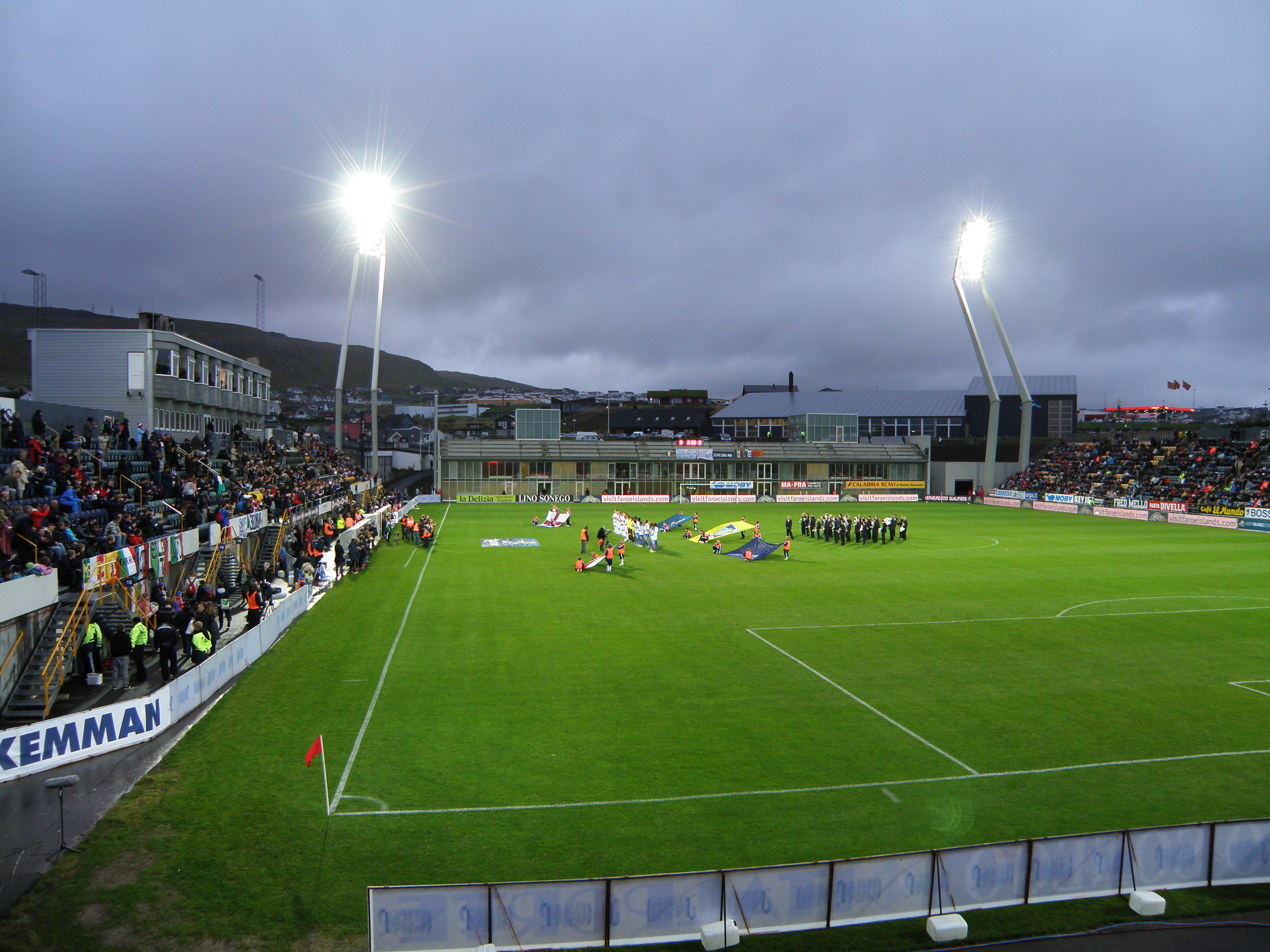
Tórsvøllur, the home stadium of the Faroe Islands national football team

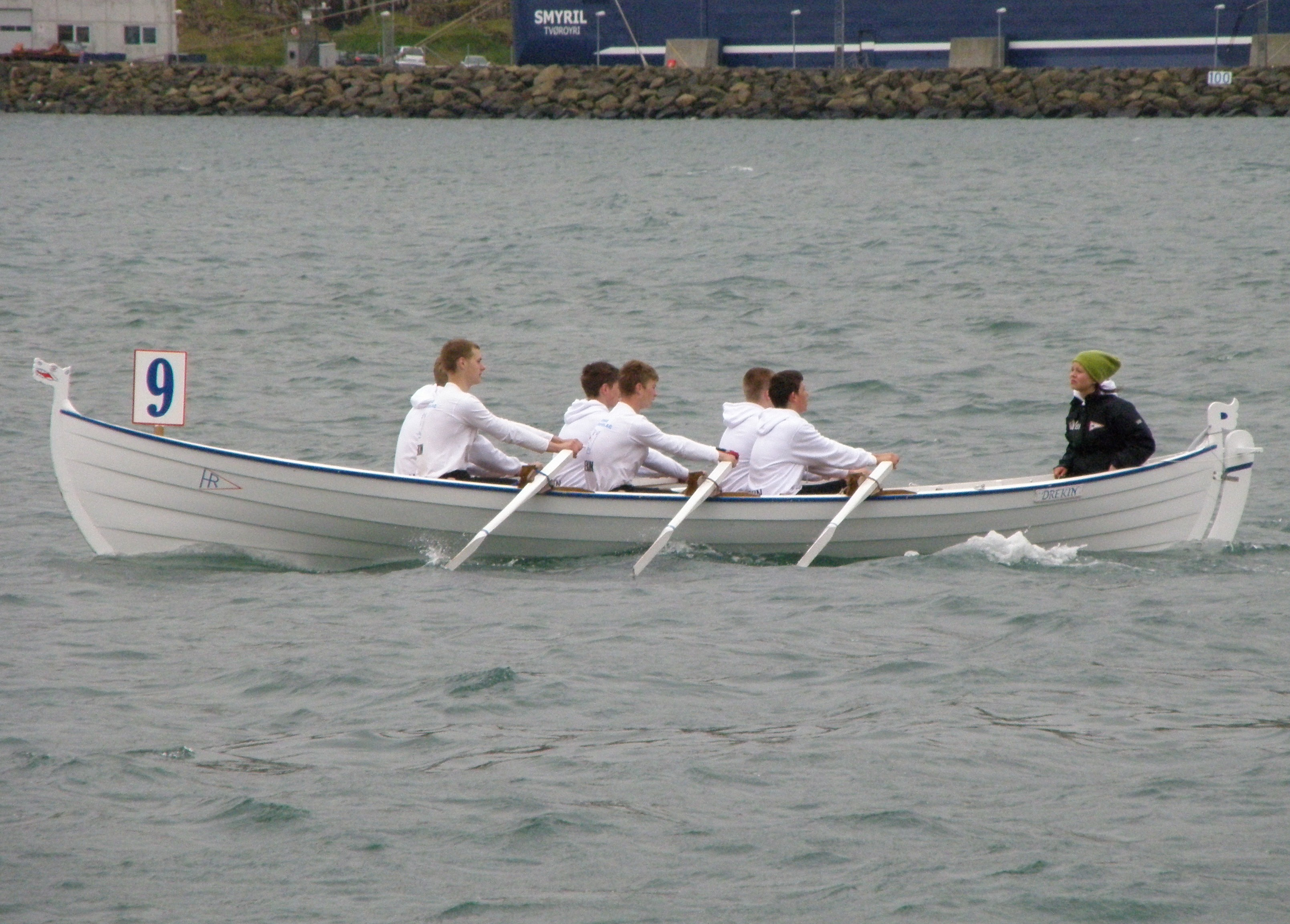
A boat race at the Jóansøka Festival in Tvøroyri in June 2011.

Tórshavn, as the capital city, is the centre of sport in the islands; the largest sports centre is located in the Gundadalur district of Tórshavn. Also, the largest football stadium, Tórsvøllur, is located here, seating 6,000 spectators. The stadium serves as home to the Faroe Islands national football team. Around the city there are also two other football pitches, indoor tennis courts, badminton courts and a swimming pool.

The city has several football clubs, including three Premier League teams: HB Tórshavn, B36 Tórshavn and Argja Bóltfelag. Other football clubs with connections to the city are FF Giza (Nólsoy), FC Hoyvík and Undrið FF. Handball is the second most popular sport in Tórshavn. The city's handball teams are Kyndil, Neistin and Ítróttafelagið H71 and the Faroe Island's national handball team practice in the city. Tórshavn city has several popular rowing clubs, including, Havnar Róðrarfelag and Róðrarfelagið Knørrur.

Every year in July the Tour of Faroe Islands, which is a road bicycle race, is held around the islands. The race, called Kring Føroyar (Tour de Faroe / Around the Faroes), starts in Klaksvík and ends in Tórshavn.

== Music ==
The Tórshavn Jazz Festival has been held annually since 1983. It attracts musicians from all over North America and Europe and has become a popular tourist event.

== Transport ==
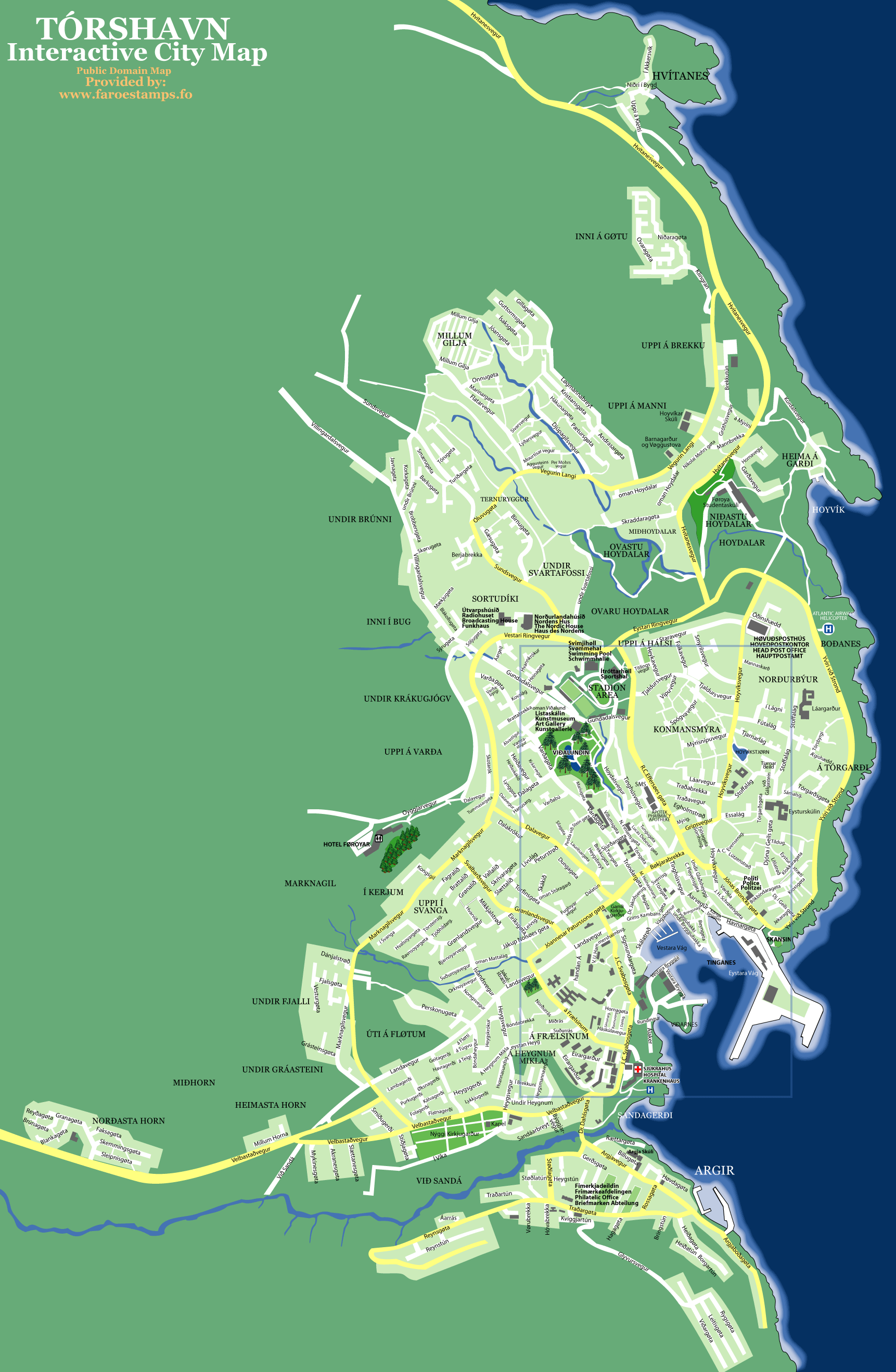
A map of Tórshavn showing road links

The harbour is served by the Smyril Line international ferry service to Denmark and Iceland. The harbour is also used by domestic ferry services of Strandfaraskip Landsins within the Faroe Islands, chiefly on the route to Tvøroyri.

The town is served by Bussleiðin – a network of local buses, with the service identified by its red livery. Bussleiðin has five routes and is operated under contract by Gundurs Bussar P/F. Buses within Tórshavn have been completely free of charge since 2007. In addition, there is a helipad by the coast.

== Sites of interest ==
Tórshavn Cathedral and Bryggjubakki street (left) and Undir Bryggjubakka street (right) at the centre of the city

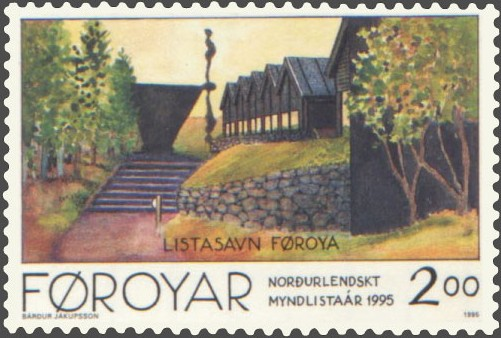
Listasavn Føroya on a national stamp, 1995.

- Tinganes, the old part of town, is still made up of small wooden houses covered with turf roofs. The oldest one dates back 500 years.
- Tórshavn Cathedral, the second oldest church in the country.
- Tórshavn harbour.
- Fort Skansin, a historic site dating back to the sixteenth century
- Listasavn Føroya, the Faroese art museum.
- The main church, Vesturkirkjan, with outside art work by Hans Pauli Olsen.
- The Nordic House in the Faroe Islands, the most important cultural institution in the Faroes.
- The historical museum in Hoyvík, with all its treasures.
- The museum of Natural History, with a small botanical garden with 150 Faroese plants.
- Niels Finsens gøta, Tórshavn's only pedestrianised street.

== Institutions in Tórshavn ==
- Løgtingið and Landstýrið, is the Faroese parliament and government with all its national institutions.
- Kringvarp Føroya (Faroese national television and radio) which is publicly owned.
- University of the Faroe Islands, situated next to the national archives, a navigational college, a teachers college, etc.
- Postverk Føroya is the postal service of the Faroe Islands.
- A number of countries have a Consulate-General in Tórshavn, including all Nordic countries and several EU countries.
- Føroya Studentaskúli og HF-Skeið is the largest and oldest high school in the country. It is located just outside Tórshavn.

== Notable people ==
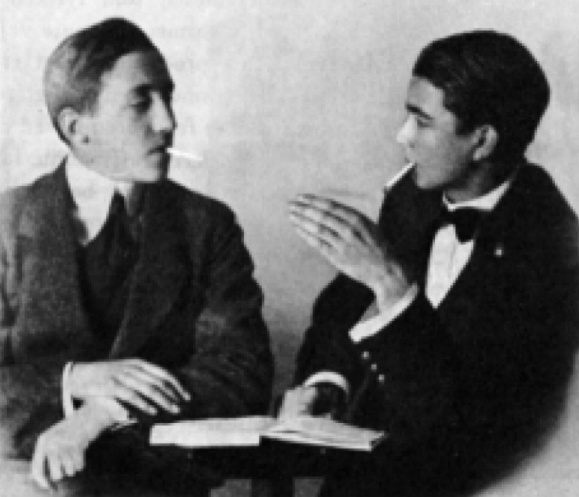
The writers William Heinesen and Jørgen-Frantz Jacobsen, 1918 (both at the age of 18)

- Niels Ryberg Finsen (1860–1904), winner of the Nobel Prize in Medicine and Physiology 1903.
- Daniel Jacob Danielsen (1871–1916), a missionary and humanitarian who helped Roger Casement to expose the horrors in the Congo Free State.
- Petur Alberg (1885–1940), composer, most famous for composing the national anthem.
- Janus Djurhuus (1881–1948), writer
- Andrea Árting (1891–1988), trade union leader
- William Heinesen (1900–1991), writer, poet, composer and painter.
- Jørgen-Frantz Jacobsen (1900–1938), writer.
- Høgni Reistrup (1984), musician, singer and songwriter.
- Ingálvur av Reyni (1920–2005), painter.
- Janus Kamban (1913–2009), sculptor.
- Zacharias Heinesen (1936), painter.
- Lisbeth L. Petersen (1939), politician.
- Guðrið Helmsdal (1941), writer.
- Katrin Ottarsdóttir (1957), filmmaker.
- Carl Jóhan Jensen (1957), writer.
- Týr, folk metal band.
- Óli Jógvansson (1969), songwriter and composer.
- Bárður Oskarsson (1972), writer and illustrator.
- Guðrið Hansdóttir (1980), singer, songwriter.
- Teitur Lassen (1977), singer, songwriter.
- Bárður Háberg (1979), songwriter and composer.
- Christian Mouritsen (1988), footballer.
- Gunnar Nielsen (1986), footballer.
- Rógvi Baldvinsson (1989), footballer.
- Súni Olsen (1981), footballer.
- Greta Svabo Bech (1987), singer.
- Sarah Mahfoud (1989), boxer.
- Helgi Dam Ziska (1990), chess player.
- Magnus Jákupsson (1994), swimmer.
- Reiley (1997), singer, social media influencer.
- Jacob Haugaard (1952), entertainer and former member of the Danish Parliament.
- Sissal (1995), singer.

== Gallery ==
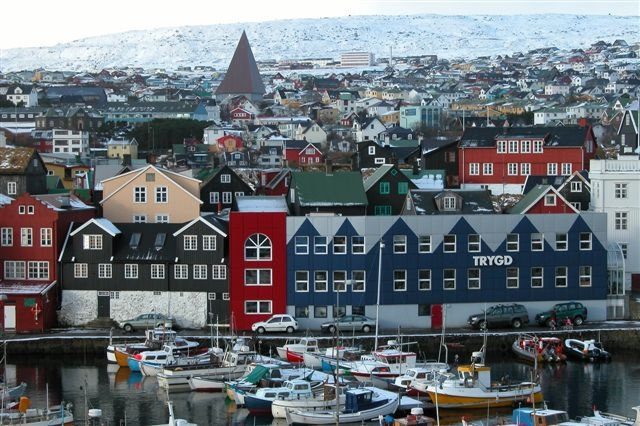
Eystaravág

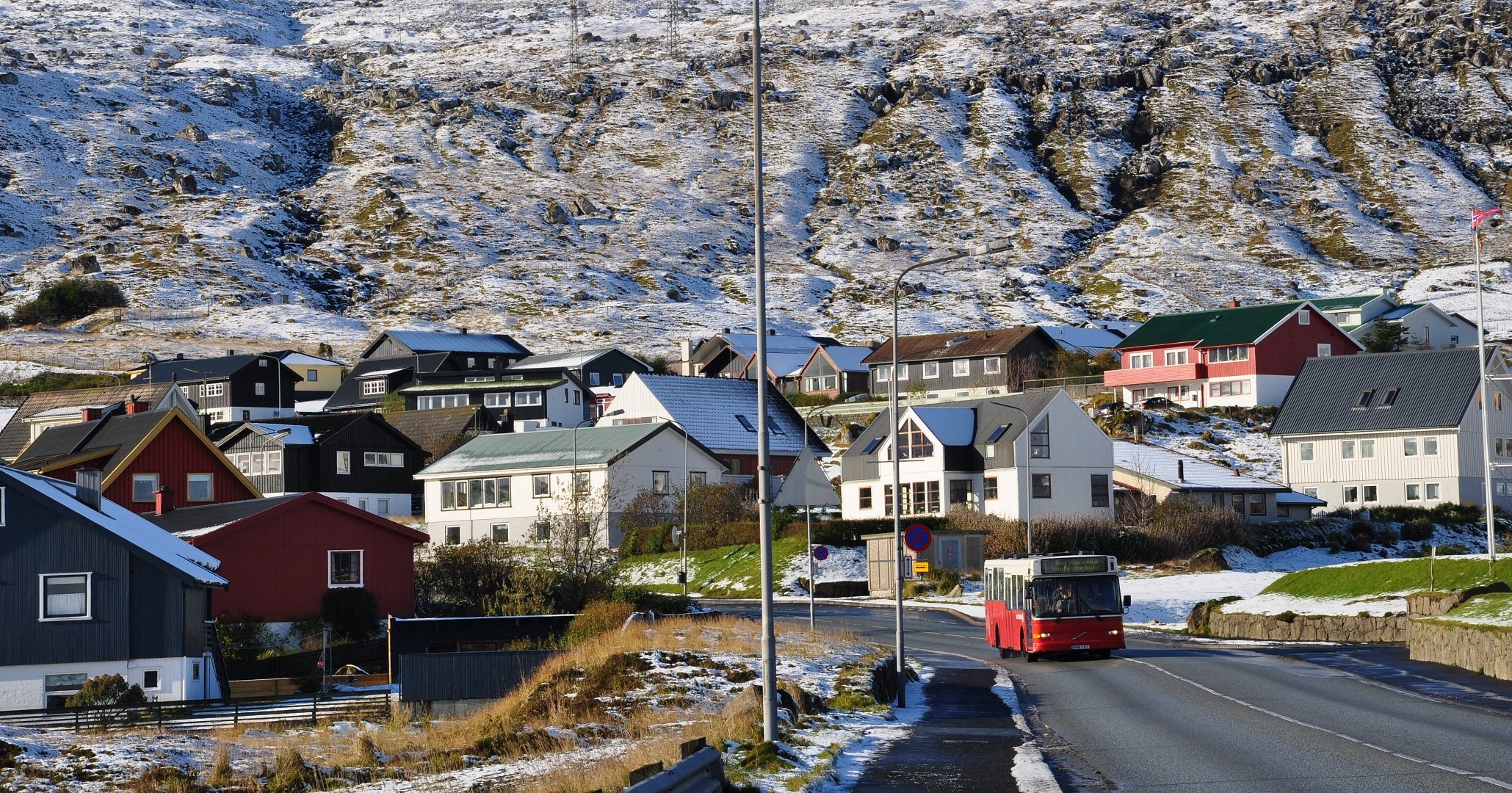
City bus on the Norðari Ringvegur

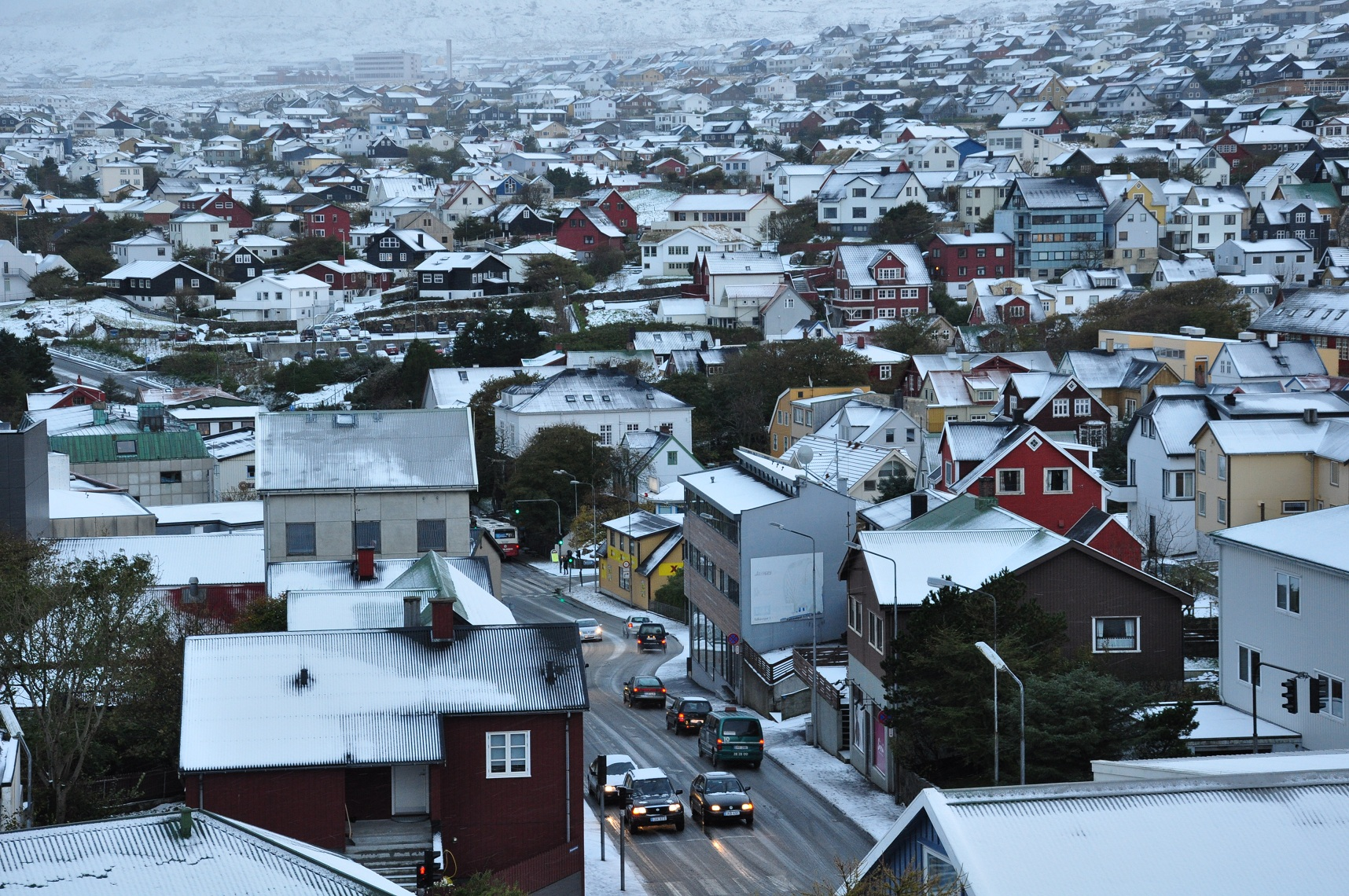
View over central Tórshavn

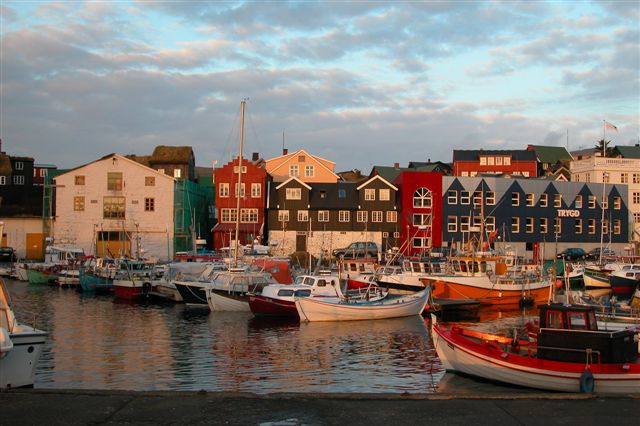
Vestaravág

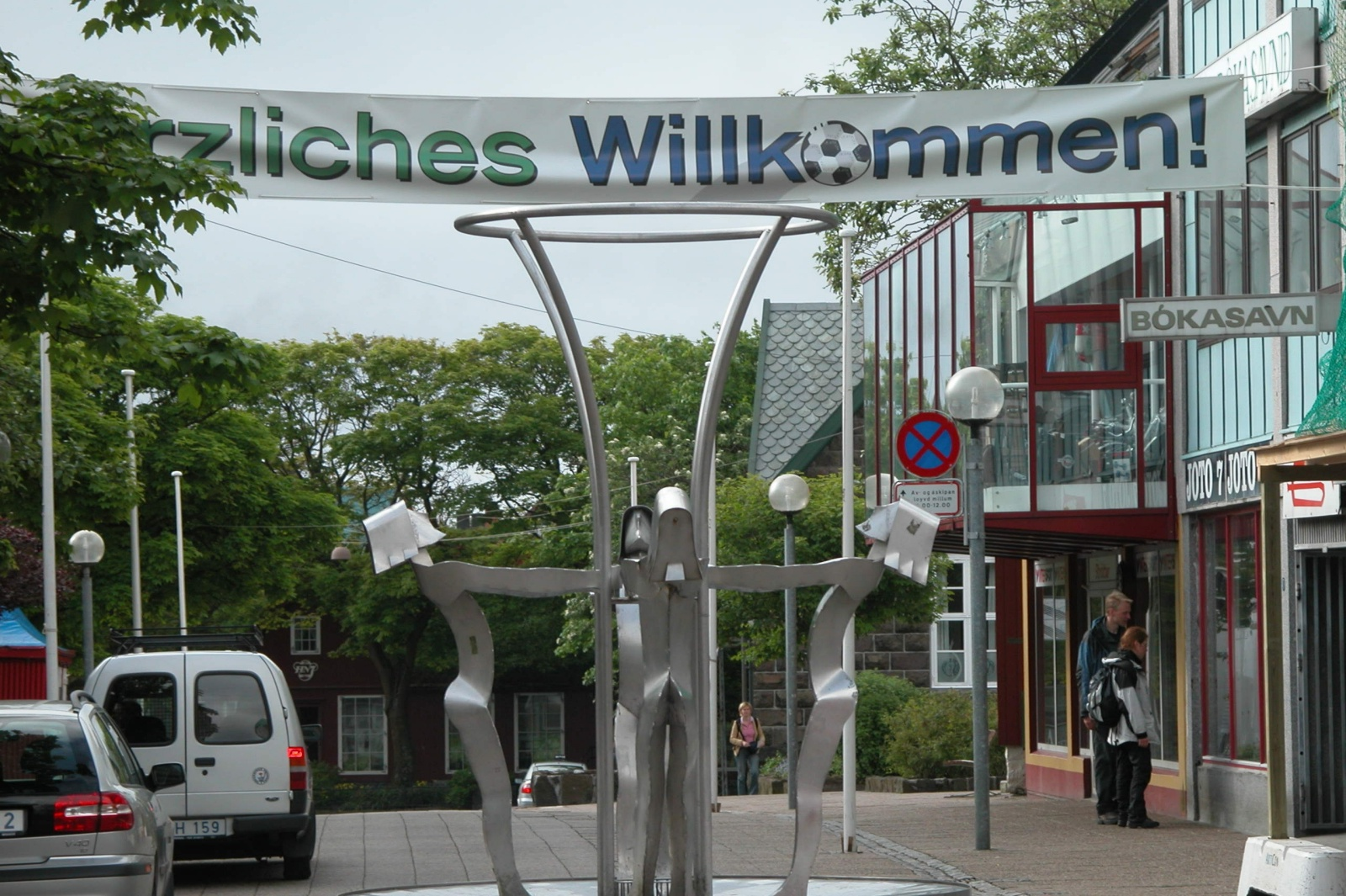
Niels Finsens Gøta

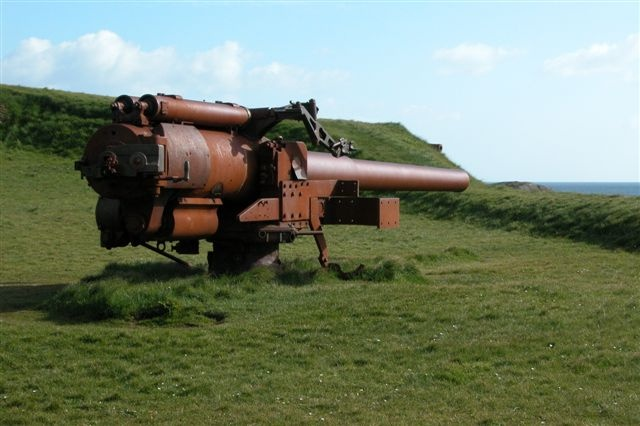
The British cannon at Skansin

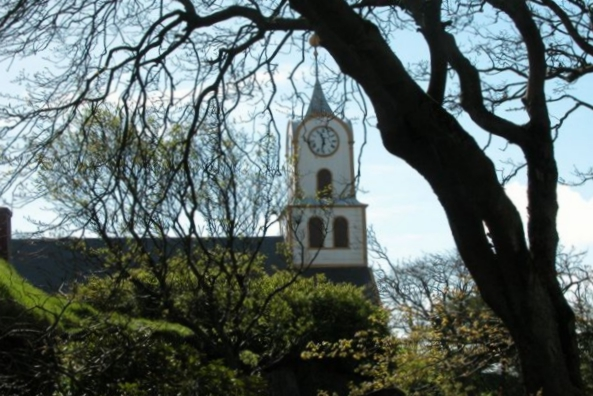
Tórshavn cathedral

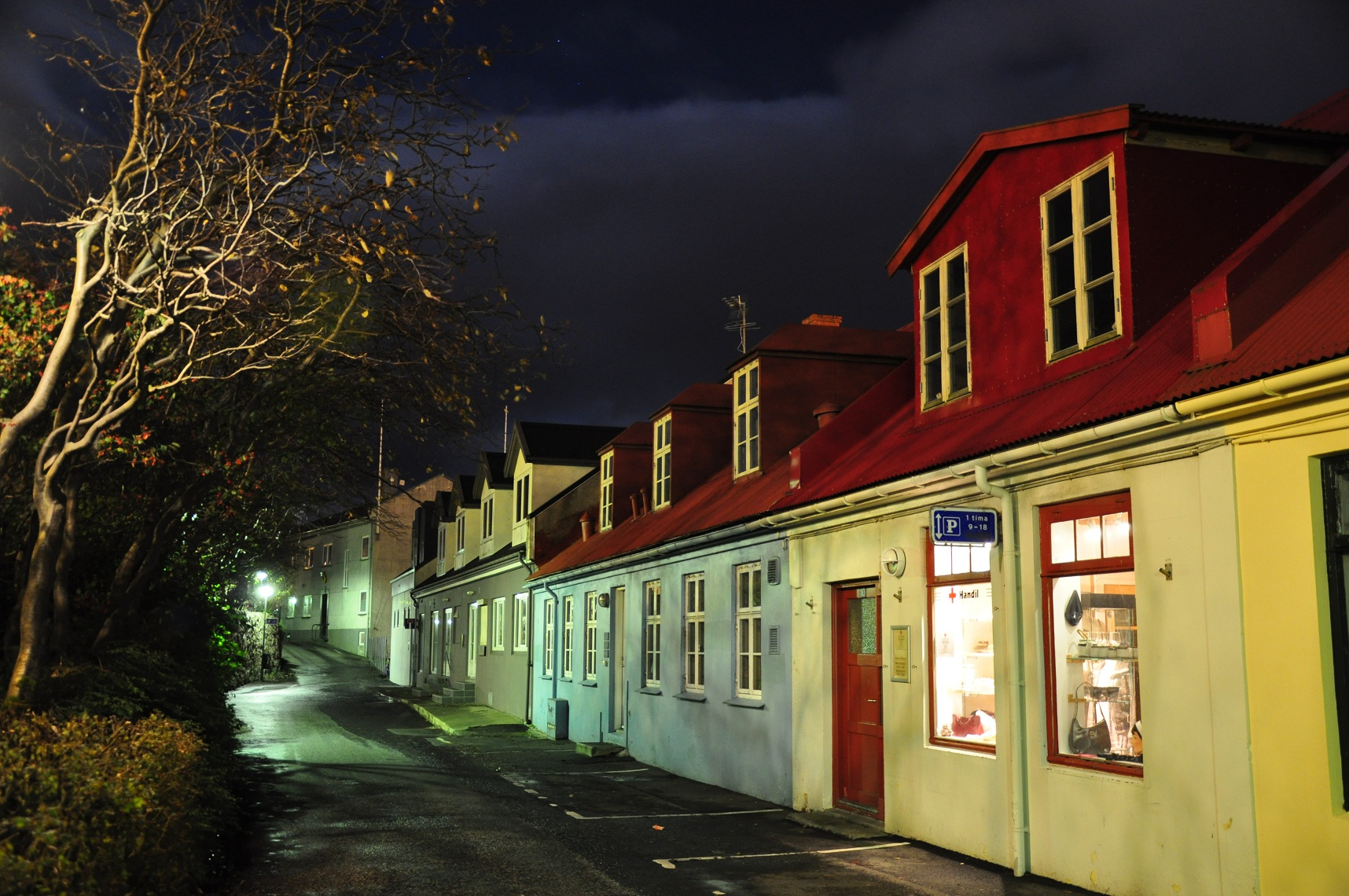
Bryggjubakki street at night

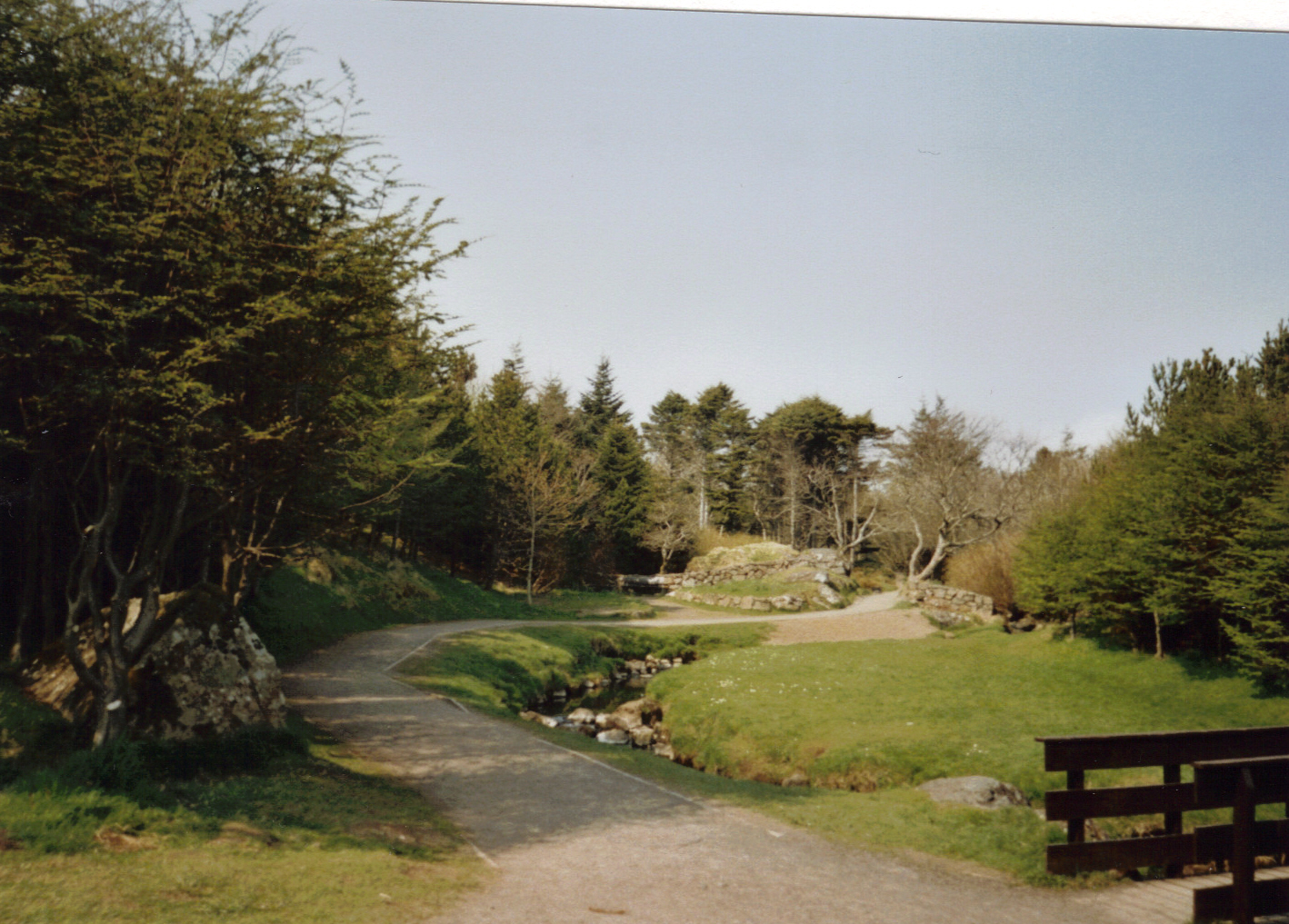
The municipal park

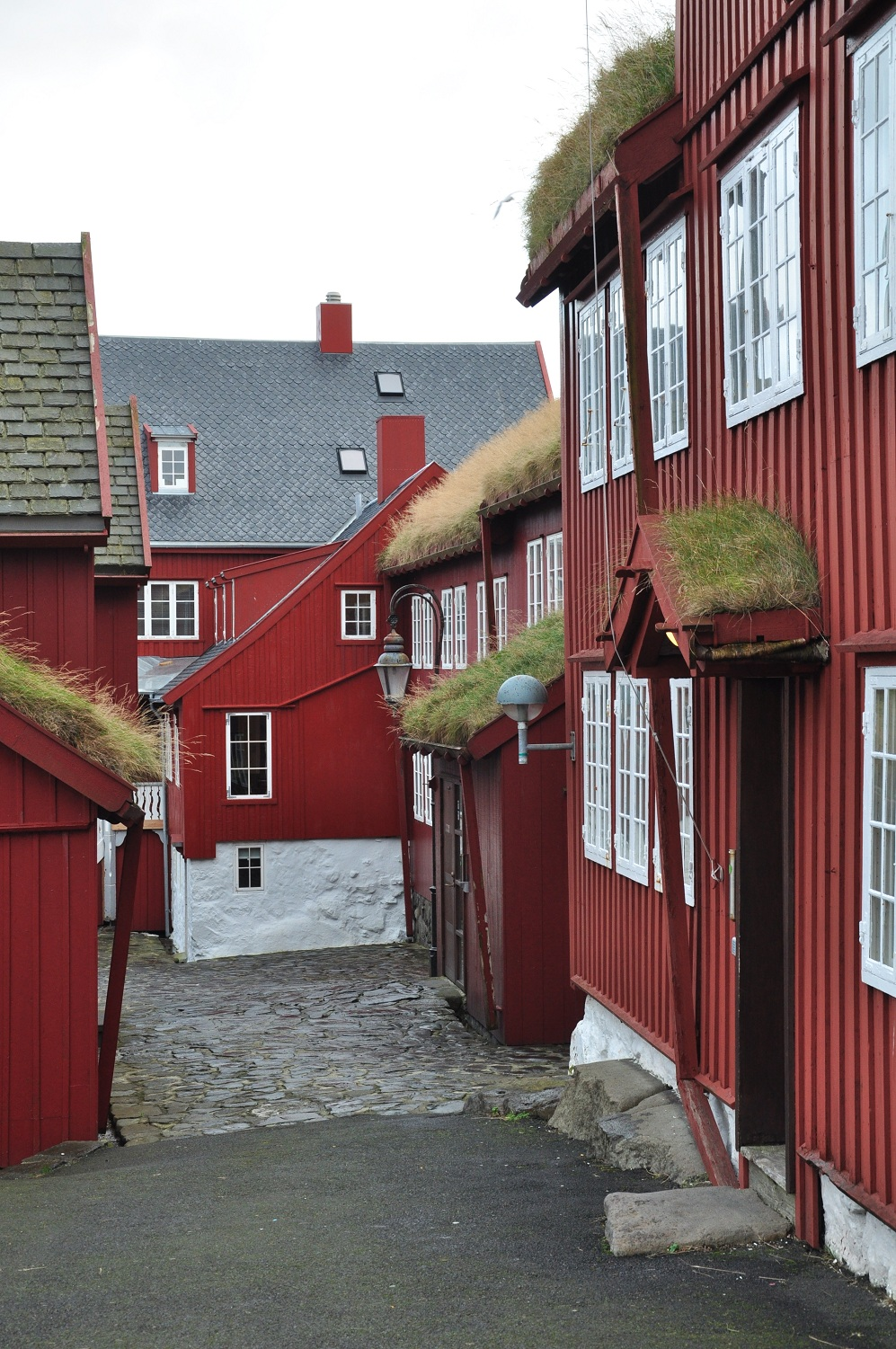
Alleys of Tinganes

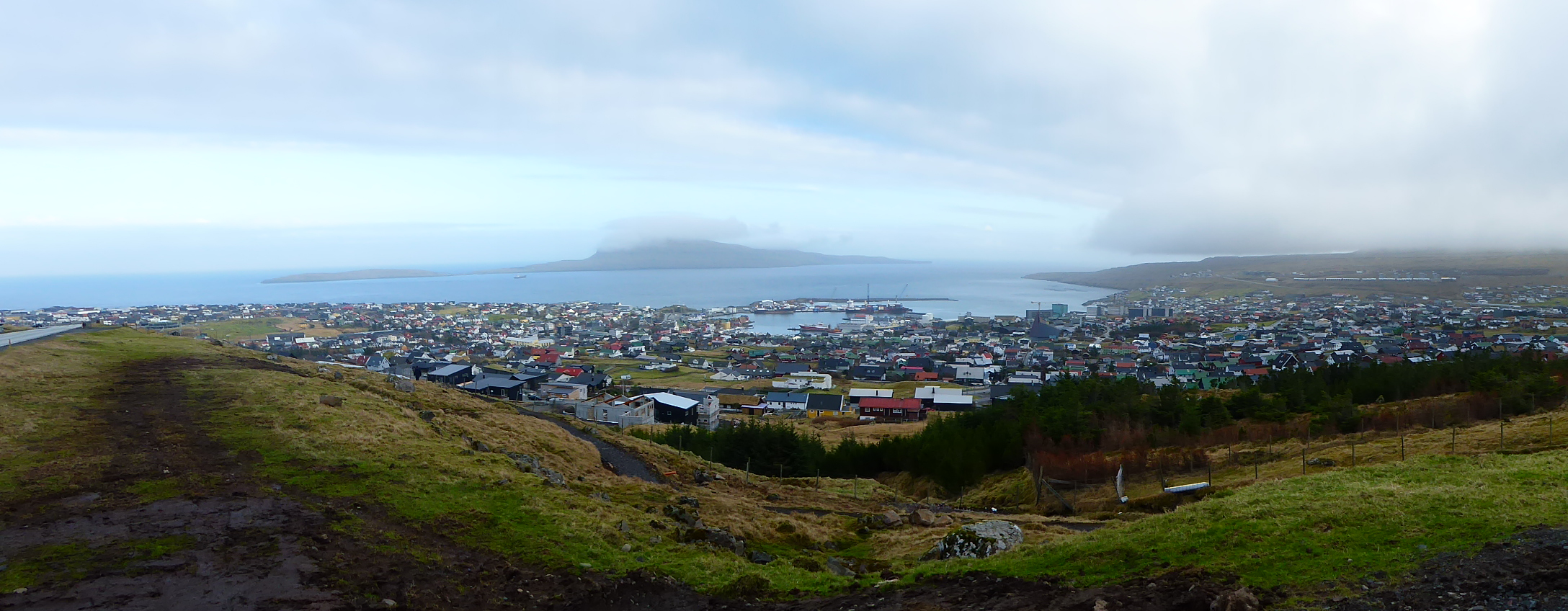
Tórshavn from Oyggjarvegur

== Twin cities ==
Tórshavn is twinned with:

- Esbjerg, Denmark
- Birkerød, Denmark
- Asker, Norway
- Garðabær, Iceland
- Reykjavík, Iceland
- Jakobstad, Finland
- Mariehamn, Åland
- Eslöv, Sweden
- Riolunato, Italy

== See also ==
- List of towns in the Faroe Islands

== Sources ==
- Havsteen-Mikkelsen, Sven (1995) Føroyinga søga (Bjarni Niclasen, týddi; Jørgen Haugan, skrivaði eftirmæli. Tórshavn: Føroya skúlabókagrunnur)
