= Gabriel Turville-Petre =

English philologist

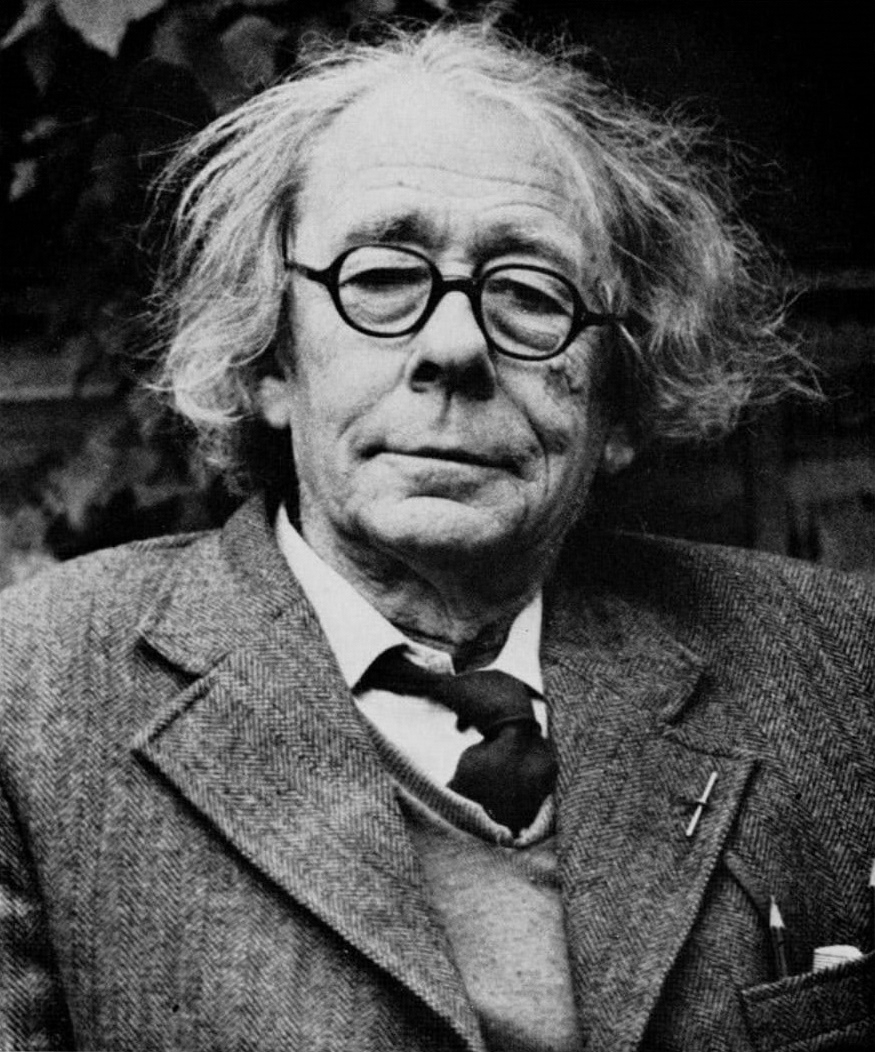
- Turville-Petre in 1972
- Born: 25 March 1908; Leicestershire, England
- Died: 17 February 1978 (aged 69); Oxford, England
- Spouse: Joan Elizabeth Blomfield (after 1943)
- Children: 3, including Thorlac Turville-Petre
- Awards: Grand Knight's Cross of the Order of the Falcon (1963)

Academic background
- Education: Ampleforth College; Christ Church, Oxford
- Academic advisors: J. R. R. Tolkien; Charles Leslie Wrenn
- Influences: Björn M. Ólsen; Sigurður Nordal; Jan de Vries; Magnus Olsen; Georges Dumézil

Academic work
- Discipline: Philology
- Sub-discipline: Icelandic studies; Old Norse studies
- Institutions: University of Oxford
- Main interests: Old Norse history, literature, mythology, poetry and religion
- Notable works: The Heroic Age of Scandinavia (1951); Origins of Icelandic Literature (1953); Myth and Religion of the North (1964); Scaldic Poetry (1976)

Edward Oswald Gabriel Turville-Petre FBA (25 March 1908 – 17 February 1978) was an English philologist who specialized in Old Norse studies. Born at Bosworth Hall, Leicestershire to a prominent Catholic family, Turville-Petre was educated in English at the University of Oxford under the tutelage of J. R. R. Tolkien. He eventually became Professor of Ancient Icelandic Literature and Antiquities at the University of Oxford and a leading member of the Viking Society for Northern Research. He was the husband of fellow philologist Joan Turville-Petre, who was a scholar of Anglo-Saxon and Old Norse studies at Oxford. Turville-Petre was the author of numerous works on Old Norse literature and religion which have remained influential up to the present day.

== Early life ==
Gabriel Turville-Petre was born at his family's ancestral home of Bosworth Hall, Husbands Bosworth, Leicestershire on 25 March 1908. He was the youngest of the five children of Lieutenant-Colonel Oswald Henry Philip Turville-Petre (1862–1941) and Margaret Lucy Cave (1875–1954). The family belonged to the Catholic landed gentry of England and his father was sheriff of Leicestershire in 1912–13. His elder brother was the archaeologist Francis Turville-Petre.

Turville-Petre received a traditional Catholic upbringing. As a child, he developed a strong interest in Iceland and its people which he would retain throughout his life.

== Education ==
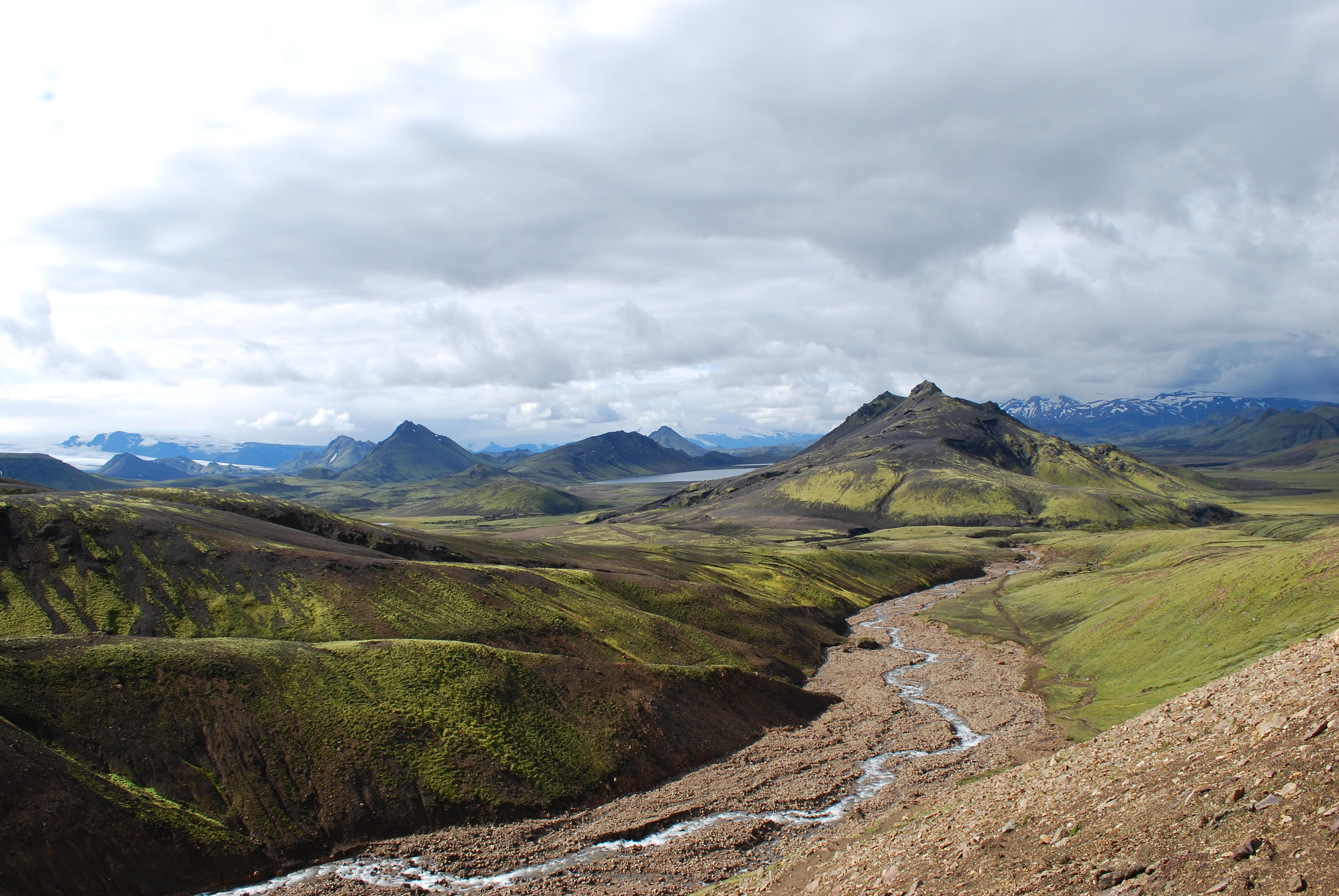
Landscape at Laugavegur, Iceland. Turville-Petre conducted much of his research in Iceland through hiking in the Icelandic countryside.

Turville-Petre was educated at Ampleforth College and entered Christ Church, Oxford University, in 1926, taking a Third in 1930. He studied for a B.Litt in English from 1931 to 1934 and was supervised by J. R. R. Tolkien, graduating in 1936. Along with Alan S. C. Ross, he was strongly influenced by Charles Leslie Wrenn.

Turville-Petre made his first of many visits to Iceland as an undergraduate in 1931. He spent much time on the remote farms in the northern and eastern parts of the island, and developed a strong fascination with the traditional way of life of the Icelanders. During his studies, Turville-Petre also travelled to Scandinavia and Germany, where he befriended many influential scholars of Old Norse studies. Þórbergur Þórðarson was among his most important teachers. Throughout his career, he would make many visits to Scandinavia, particularly to Uppsala and Odense.

Turville-Petre became fluent in Icelandic, Faroese, Norwegian, Swedish and German, and was also proficient in French. During his studies, he also acquired proficiency in Irish and Welsh, which enabled him to study Celtic literature. His knowledge of Celtic literature would prove indispensable for his later research on Norse mythology. Throughout his later career, Turville-Petre would make frequent visits to Wales to study Celtic material. Other languages in which Turville-Petre would eventually become proficient include Latin, Old English and Gothic.

== Early career ==
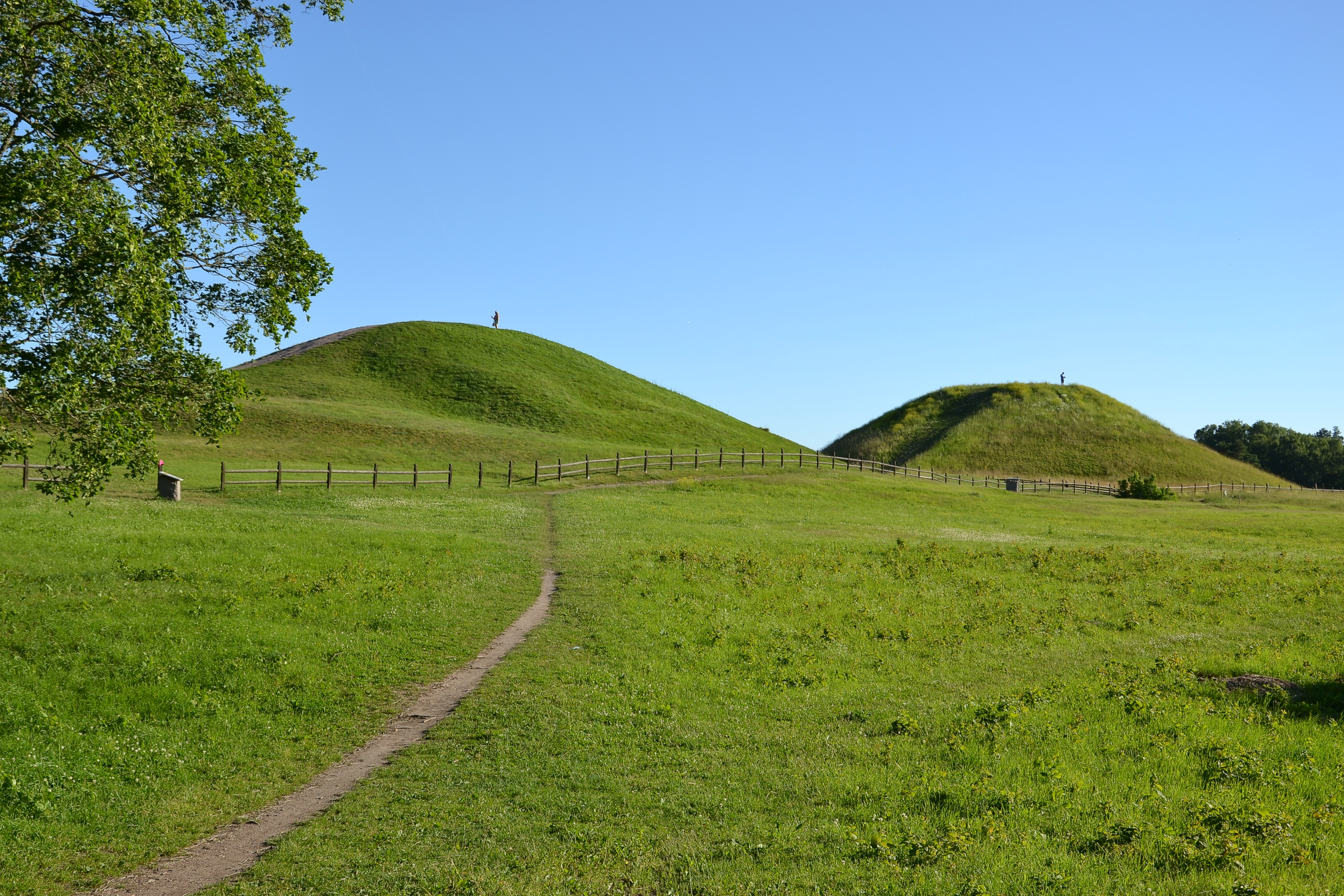
Royal mounds at Gamla Uppsala, where many events of Old Norse literature take place

Turville-Petre was Honorary Lecturer in Modern Icelandic at the University of Leeds from 1935 to 1950. He joined the Viking Society for Northern Research in 1935, and was elected to its Council in 1936. He would be closely associated with the Society for the rest of his life, publishing numerous papers, reviews, translations and editions for it. From 1936 to 1938 Turville-Petre was Lektor in English at the University of Iceland, during which he served as the British pro-consul in Reykjavík. For a time he also lectured at the University of Turku. In 1939, Turville-Petre became Joint Honorary Secretary and Joint Editor of the Saga-Book, which is published by the Viking Society for Northern Research. He resigned as an editor in 1963, but continued to hold the position of Joint Honorary Secretary until his death.

In 1940, Turville-Petre's graduate work on the Víga-Glúms saga was published as the first of the Oxford English Monographs series. It was influenced by the research of Björn M. Ólsen and Sigurður Nordal. By this time, he had already published several influential papers on Old Norse literature and religion, and had established himself as a major authority in these fields.

== Vigfússon Reader at the University of Oxford ==
Turville-Petre was appointed the first Vigfússon Reader in Ancient Icelandic Literature and Antiquities at University of Oxford in 1941. At the time he was serving as a cryptoanalyst at Bletchley Park. He spent much of World War II in the Foreign Office, and was not able to take up his position at Oxford until 1946. In August 1942 he was dispatched by the Foreign Office to the Faroe Islands "in order to study the inhabitants, their politics and conditions of life", staying there for two months. In 1941–1942 Turville-Petre entered into a notable dispute with Charles Leslie Wrenn over the date of composition of the sagas of Icelanders. In his notable Notes on the intellectual history of Icelanders (1942), Turville-Petre provided a summary of early Icelandic literary history which is still considered authoritative, and argued that these sagas were composed in from the 13th century. This view has since become generally accepted. Apart from the dispute with Wrenn, Turville-Petre was not involved in many scholarly controversies. He had little patience for charlatans, but was known for his tolerance and kindness to amateurs genuinely interested in gaining knowledge in his fields of expertise. Though Turville-Petre never derided his students or fellow scholars for their intellectual shortcomings, he strictly demanded that his students dedicate themselves as rigorously to scholarship as he himself did.

In 1942, together with Elizabeth Stefanyja Olszewska (1906–1973), wife of Alan S. C. Ross, Turville-Petre published a translation of Guðmundar saga biskups. The introduction written by Turville-Petre to this work reveal a clear admiration for Guðmundur Arason's contemporary, Páll Jónsson.

In 1944, Turville-Petre published an essay on Gísli Súrsson, revised and republished in Nine Norse Studies (1972). In 1951, he published The Heroic Age of Scandinavia, an account of the legends and history of Scandinavia in the Migration Period and the Viking Age. In this work, Turville-Petre contended, in disagreement with many Scandinavian scholars, that Icelandic literature provided much useful information on the early history and culture of Scandinavia.

== Origins of Icelandic Literature ==
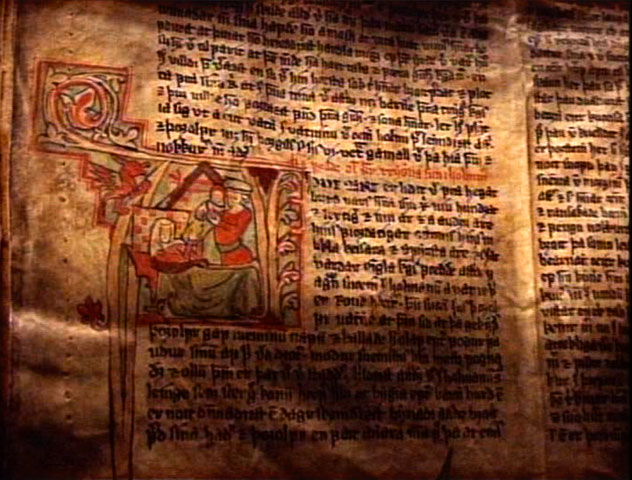
Detail from a 13th-century manuscript of the sagas of Icelanders

In 1953, Turville-Petre published Origins of Icelandic Literature. Republished in revised second edition in 1967, it is considered his magnum opus and most influential work. Origins of Icelandic Literature provides a detailed account of the settlement, and early history of Iceland. In this work, he notably contended that the Icelanders produced "the richest and most varied" literature of medieval Europe. He suggested that the Icelandic writers both preserved older Scandinavian oral traditions and developed newer ones. Turville-Petre also suggested that Celtic settlers in Iceland significantly contributed to the distinctive characteristics of Icelandic literature, particularly its poetry. He also suggested Old English and Irish influences. Turville-Petre proposed that the fact that the Icelanders were an uprooted people who had left their Scandinavian homelands, made their conversion to Christianity easier and more peaceful, which may explain the relative tolerance of the Christian Icelanders towards pagans in the years after the conversion (c. 1000 AD).

The Origins of Icelandic Literature gives accounts of a number of early Icelandic writers, including Sæmundr Sigfússon and Ari Thorgilsson. Turville-Petre believed that Thorgilsson was an important source for the later Landnámabók. Origins of Icelandic Literature also deals extensively with the Kings' sagas, which he believed were the product of both earlier Scandinavian traditions and more recent Christian influences. Turville-Petre believed that the Egil's Saga had been written by Snorri Sturluson.

== Professor at the University of Oxford ==
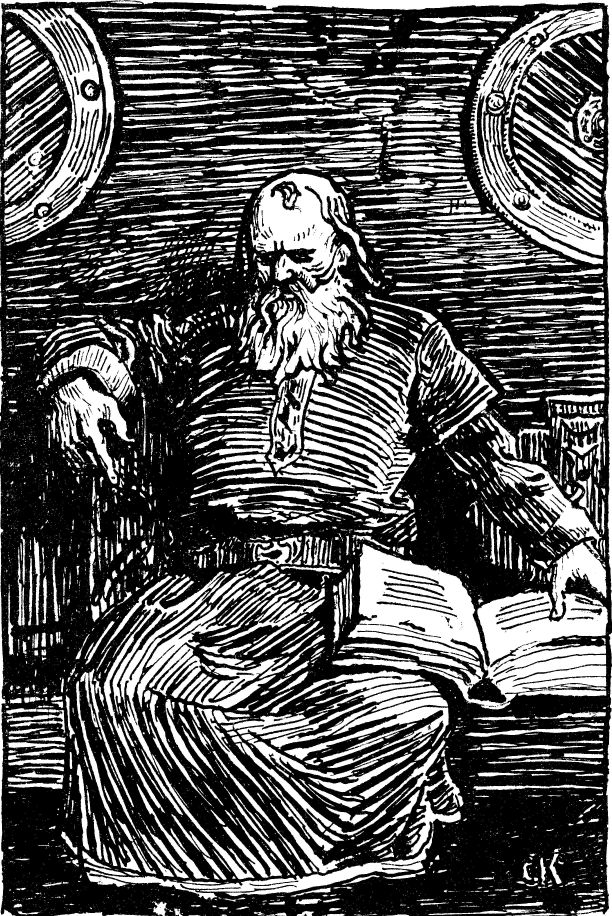
Snorri Sturluson by Christian Krohg (1890s). Turville-Petre argued that Sturluson's writings on Norse mythology were mostly based on authentic material, and partially derived from earlier Germanic and Indo-European components.

In 1953, Turville-Petre was appointed Professor at the University of Oxford (1953-1975). The same year he became General Editor of the text and monographs series of the Viking Society for Northern Research. In 1956, the Society appointed Turville-Petre one of its twelve Honorary Life Members. Following up on his The Heroic Age of Scandinavia, Turville-Petre and Christopher Tolkien published Hervarar saga ok Heiðreks in 1956. It provides a translation and commentary on the Hervarar saga ok Heiðreks, which is considered one of the most archaic and interesting of the Icelandic legendary sagas.

With Sigurður Nordal, Turville-Petre was General Editor of the Icelandic Texts (1959-1965), a collection of saga text and translations published in four volumes by Nelson. Turville-Petre received the Knight's Cross of the Order of the Falcon in 1956, and the even more prestigious Grand Knight's Cross of the Order of the Falcon in 1963, both of which were conferred upon him by the President of Iceland. He was the recipient of honorary doctorates from University of Iceland (1961) and Uppsala University (1977), and was a member of many Icelandic and Scandinavian learned societies, including the Icelandic Literary Society (1948), the Royal Gustavus Adolphus Academy (1960), and the Royal Society of Arts and Sciences in Gothenburg (1976).

== Myth and Religion of the North ==
Since the early 1930s, Turville-Petre had published numerous influential papers on Old Norse religion, particularly on Norse deities such as Odin and Freyr. By the 1950s, it had become fashionable among some scholars to dismiss the writings of Snorri Sturluson on Norse mythology and other subjects as mere literary inventions without any foundations in earlier traditions. Turville-Petre disagreed, and believed that Snorri Sturluson's writings were based on genuine material. In view of this, he became greatly interested in the research of the celebrated French philologist Georges Dumézil, known for his comparative studies of Indo-European mythology and formulation of the trifunctional hypothesis. Dumézil had published numerous monographs on the Indo-European components in Germanic mythology, which greatly impressed Turville-Petre. Between 1953 and 1955, Turville-Petre published sympathetic reviews of three of Dumézil's monographs in the Saga-Book, and in 1956 he invited him to lecture at the University of Oxford. He also published the article "Professor Dumézil and the literature of Iceland" in Hommages á Georges Dumézil (1960).

Turville-Petre's research on Old Norse religion culminated in his publishing of Myth and Religion of the North (1964), which was published by Weidenfeld & Nicolson as part of their History of Religion series. It has been described as his most ambitious and substantial work. Myth and Religion of the North provides a comprehensive overview of Old Norse religion, and cites both Norse, Anglo-Saxon, Celtic, Baltic and Germanic material. Like Dumézil, Turville-Petre was considered an expert on Germanic Antiquity. Although certainly influenced by the theories of Dumézil, Myth and Religion of the North does not accept all of Dumézil's theories. As such it contrasted with Jan de Vries' second edition of Altgermanische Religionsgeschichte (1956-1957), which fully incorporates the theories of Dumézil, including the trifunctional hypothesis. Turville-Petre was of the opinion that Old Norse religion contained many archaic features derived from earlier Indo-European and Germanic components, but also features that are of late and local character, some of which may have derived from Christian influences. Myth and Religion of the North remains a pioneering and influential work, and has been and still is considered by many scholars to be the best work available in the English language on Old Norse religion.

== Later career and retirement ==
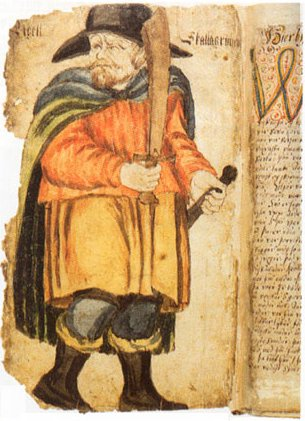
Picture of Egill Skallagrímsson in the 17th century manuscript of Egil's Saga. Turville-Petre's research in later life strongly centered on pieces of Old Norse poetry such as Egil's Saga.

Turville-Petre was elected to a studentship at Christ Church, Oxford in 1964. With Edgar C. Polomé, he authored the article on Germanic religion and mythology for the 15th edition of Encyclopædia Britannica. Turville-Petre was visiting professor at the University of Melbourne in 1965. At Melbourne, he made significant contributions to the development of Icelandic studies in Australia, which he visited three times in the succeeding years. His trips to Australia were strongly encouraged by his friend and fellow philologist Ian Maxwell. Turville-Petre predicted that Australia would in time become the leading nation on Icelandic studies in the English-speaking world.

In 1972, the Viking Society for Northern Research presented Turville-Petre with Nine Norse Studies, a selection of papers written by him between 1940 and 1962. He was elected a Fellow of the British Academy in 1973. Turville-Petre retired from Oxford as Professor Emeritus in 1975. He was succeeded as Vigfússon Reader at Oxford by Ursula Dronke. From 1975 to 1978 he was a Research Fellow at University College London. In 1976, the Viking Society for Northern Research instituted the annual Turville-Petre Prize to be awarded to a student at the University of Oxford for distinguished scholarship on "Northern Research".

In his later career, Turville-Petre devoted himself particularly to the study of Old Norse poetry. He was especially interested in the origins of the dróttkvætt, which he believed to be derived from Celtic, particularly Irish, influences. In 1954 he had already published a celebrated paper in Icelandic on that particular subject, which was later translated into English and published under the title ''On the poetry of the scalds and of the filid. He saw clear parallels between the Norse skalds and the Irish filí. Turville-Petre's research on Old Norse poetry culminated in his publishing of Scaldic Poetry (1976). It devoted particular focus to early Icelandic poets such as Egill Skallagrímsson and Þjóðólfr of Hvinir. Scaldic Poetry provides testimony to his mastery of the subject as a result of a long life of passionate study.

== Death and legacy ==
Turville-Petre died of cancer in Oxford on 17 February 1978. He bequeathed his personal library to the English Faculty Library of Oxford University (Icelandic Collections). At Oxford, the room which houses the university's collection of books on Old Norse and Icelandic is named after him. Speculum Norroenum (1981), a festschrift in Turville-Petre's honor edited by Ursula Dronke, was published by the University Press of Southern Denmark after his death. The festschrift included an affectionate memoir of Turville-Petre by his Icelandic friend Einar Ólafur Sveinsson, some of whose works Turville-Petre had translated from Icelandic into English.

Turville-Petre was highly regarded as a teacher and academic supervisor, and was responsible for the tutoring of generations of scholars in his fields. At Oxford he supervised students from all over the world, who would later come to hold prominent academic posts in numerous countries. His research and works have made major contributions to knowledge of Norse culture and Icelandic literature.

== Personal life ==
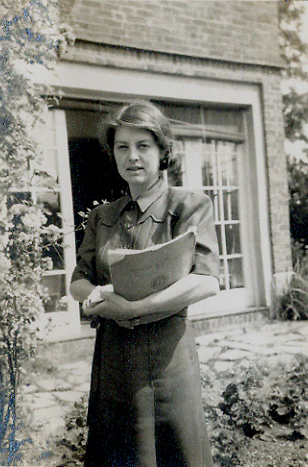
Joan Turville-Petre, 1943

Turville-Petre married Joan Elizabeth Blomfield on 7 January 1943. She was a distinguished scholar on Anglo-Saxon and Old Norse studies at Oxford. They had three sons: Thorlac Francis Samuel (born 6 January 1944), Merlin Oswald (born 2 July 1946) and Brendan Arthur Auberon (born 16 September 1948). Turville-Petre had a strong passion for, and great knowledge of, ornithology.

== Selected works ==
- "The Cult of Freyr in the Evening of Paganism" Proceedings of the Leeds Philosophical and Literary Society 111(6):317-322 (1935)
- "The Traditions of Víga-Glúms Saga" Transactions of the Philological Society 54-75 (1936)
- Víga-Glúms Saga, Clarendon Press, Oxford (1940)
- The Life of Gudmund the Good, Bishop of Holar Trans: E. O. G. Turville-Petre and E. S. Olszewska. Coventry, The Viking Society for Northern Research (1942)
- The Heroic Age of Scandinavia Hutchinson, London (1951)
- Origins of Icelandic Literature Clarendon Press, Oxford (1953)
- Hervarar Saga ok Heidreks (ed. E. O. G. Turville-Petre) London: University College London, for the Viking Society for Northern Research. Introduction by C. J. R. Tolkien (1956)
- Myth and Religion of the North: The Religion of Ancient Scandinavia Weidenfeld and Nicolson, London (1964)
- "Fertility of Beast and Soil in Old Norse Literature" in Old Norse Literature and Mythology: A Symposium (ed. Edgar C. Polomé) University of Texas Press, Austin. 244–64 (1969)
- Scaldic Poetry Clarendon Press, Oxford (1976)
- Nine Norse Studies London: University College London, for the Viking Society for Northern Research (1972)

== See also ==
- Hector Munro Chadwick
- Bertha Phillpotts
- Rudolf Simek
- John Lindow
- Hilda Ellis Davidson
- Lee M. Hollander
- Andy Orchard
- Edgar C. Polomé

== Sources ==
- Foote, P. G. (1978). "Gabriel Turville-Petre" (PDF). Saga-Book. XX. Viking Society for Northern Research: 1–3. Archived from the original (PDF) on 26 August 2020.
- Foote, Peter (1980). "Gabriel Turville-Petre" (PDF). Proceedings of the British Academy. 64. Oxford University Press: 467–481. Archived from the original (PDF) on 3 March 2020.
- O'Donoghue, Heather (23 September 2004). "Petre, (Edward Oswald) Gabriel Turville". Oxford Dictionary of National Biography (online ed.). Oxford University Press. doi:10.1093/ref:odnb/58900. (Subscription, Wikipedia Library access or UK public library membership required.)
- Strutynski, Udo (1974). "History and Structure in Germanic Mythology". In Larson, Gerald J.; Puhvel, Jaan; Littleton, C. Scott (eds.). Myth in Indo-European Antiquity. University of California Press. pp. 29–50. ISBN 0-520-02378-1.
- Turville-Petre, Thorlac (2017). "A Visit to the Faroe Islands in 1942 by Gabriel Turville-Petre". Fróðskaparrit. 64. Faroese Scientific Society: 161–182. doi:10.18602/fsj.v0i0.104. Archived from the original on 26 October 2021.
- "Prof Gabriel Turville-Petre". The Times. 18 February 1978. p. 16.
- "Edward Oswald Gabriel Turville-Petre". Contemporary Authors. Gale. 4 December 2001.
