= Joan Turville-Petre =

English philologist

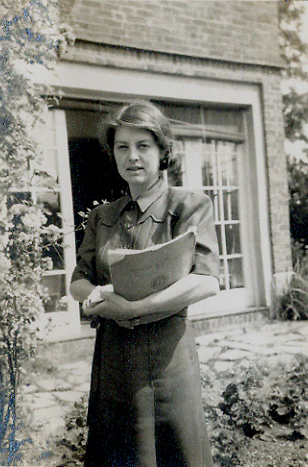
Joan Turville-Petre, 1943

Joan Elizabeth Turville-Petre (10 May 1911 – 9 March 2006) was an English philologist at the University of Oxford who specialized in Anglo-Saxon and Old Norse studies.

== Life ==
Joan Turville-Petre (née Blomfield) was the daughter of Sam Blomfield and Kate Barton of Colchester, Essex. In 1930 she began her studies at Somerville College, Oxford University and she maintained a lifelong connection with the college. She was a Tutor and Fellow from 1941 to 1946, a lecturer in English from 1946 to 1965 and an Honorary College Research Fellow from 1965 until her death in 2006.

On 7 January 1943, Joan Turville-Petre married Gabriel Turville-Petre, a fellow Oxford academic working in the same field. There were no guests at their wedding, but their friends J. R. R. and Edith Tolkien were there as witnesses. They had three sons: Thorlac Francis Samuel (born 6 January 1944), Merlin Oswald (born 2 July 1946) and Brendan Arthur Auberon (16 September 1948 – 6 December 1981).

Joan Turville-Petre died at the age of 94. Her funeral was held at St Michael's, Aylsham on 23 March 2006.

== Selected publications ==
- "Runes and the Gothic alphabet" Saga-Book of the Viking Society for Northern Research 12 (1937–45) 177–94; 209–31
- "Studies on the Ormulum MS." Journal of English and German Philology 46(1) (January 1947), 1–27
- The story of Rauð and his sons Trans. from the Icelandic by J.E. Turville-Petre. Viking Society for Northern Research. Payne Memorial Series II. (1947)
- "Hengest and Horsa" Saga-Book of the Viking Society for Northern Research 14 (1953–7) 273-90
- "Sources of the Vernacular Homily in England, Norway and Iceland" Arkiv för Nordik Filologi 75 (1960), 168–82.
- "Translations of a Lost Penitential Homily" Traditio 19 (1963) 51–78
- "The metre of Icelandic court poetry" Saga-Book of the Viking Society for Northern Research 17 (1966–69) 326–51
- "Beowulf and Grettis saga: An excursion" Saga-Book of the Viking Society for Northern Research 19 (1974–77) 347–57
- "The genealogist and history: Ari to Snorri" Saga-Book of the Viking Society for Northern Research 20 (1978–81) 7–23
- The Old English "Exodus" Text, translation and commentary by J. R. R. Tolkien; edited by Joan Turville-Petre. Clarendon Press, Oxford (1981)
- Meulengracht Sørensen, Preben The unmanly man: concepts of sexual defamation in early northern society Trans. by Joan Turville-Petre. Odense: Odense University Press (1983)
- Jón Hnefill Aðalsteinsson A Piece of Horse Liver: Myth, Ritual, and Folklore in Old Icelandic Sources Trans. by Terry Gunnell and Joan Turville-Petre, Háskólaútgáfan Félagsvísindastofnun (1998)

== See also ==
- Nora K. Chadwick
- Bertha Phillpotts
- Ursula Dronke
- Hilda Ellis Davidson
