= Ursula Dronke =

English medievalist

Ursula Miriam Dronke (née Brown) (3 November 1920, Sunderland, UK – 8 March 2012, Cambridge, UK) was an English medievalist and former Vigfússon Reader in Old Norse at the University of Oxford and an Emeritus Fellow of Linacre College, Oxford. She also taught at LMU Munich and at the Faculty of Modern and Medieval Languages of the University of Cambridge.

== Biography ==
Born in Sunderland and raised in Newcastle upon Tyne, where her father was a lecturer at Newcastle University, Ursula Brown attended Newcastle Church High School as a girl and began her academic studies as an undergraduate at the University of Tours in 1939, returning to England and enrolling in Somerville College, University of Oxford, after the outbreak of war. She then worked for the Board of Trade until 1946, when she returned to Somerville as a graduate student in Old Norse and beginning in 1950 was a fellow and tutor in English. Her Bachelor of Literature thesis on an edition of Þorgils and Hafliða from the Sturlunga saga was passed by J. R. R. Tolkien and Alistair Campbell in July 1949 and formed the basis of a monograph, Þorgils Saga ok Hafliða, published in 1952.

In 1960, Brown married fellow medievalist Peter Dronke, and moved with him to the University of Cambridge. They collaborated several times, and jointly gave the 1997 H.M. Chadwick Memorial Lecture at the Department of Anglo-Saxon, Norse and Celtic.

In the early 1970s, Ursula Dronke was a professor and acting head of Old Norse studies at LMU Munich. In 1976, she was elected Vigfússon Reader in Old Icelandic literature and antiquities at Oxford, and became a research fellow of Linacre College there. She retired and became emeritus Reader and emeritus fellow in 1988. She was able to obtain an endowment from the Rausing family of Sweden to support the Vigfússon Readership in perpetuity.

Dronke's edition of the Poetic Edda with translation and commentary (three volumes published of a projected four) has been praised for its scholarship, insight, and skilful and poetic renderings. The series "has completely dominated Eddaic studies worldwide, with the sophistication of its literary analyses and the tremendous breadth of background knowledge brought to bear on the poetry", and in particular, her translation of "Völuspá" "restored it as a work of art." Her collected essays, Myth and Fiction in Early Norse Lands (1996) relate a broad range of early Scandinavian literary and mythological topics to the Indo-European heritage and to medieval European thought, and "[demonstrate] the palpable enthusiasm of a fine scholar and teacher". In 1980, she gave the Dorothea Coke Memorial Lecture for the Viking Society for Northern Research, and she was co-editor of the festschrift for Gabriel Turville-Petre.

== Selected publications ==
=== Editions and translations ===
- (as Ursula Brown). Þorgils Saga ok Hafliða. Oxford English Monographs 3. London: Oxford, 1952.
- The Poetic Edda Volume I Heroic Poems. Edited with translation, introduction and commentary. Oxford: Clarendon/Oxford University, 1969.
- The Poetic Edda Volume II Mythological Poems. Edited with translation, introduction and commentary. Oxford: Clarendon/Oxford University, 1997. ISBN 0-19-811181-9
- The Poetic Edda Volume III Mythological Poems II. Edited with translation, introduction and commentary. Oxford: Clarendon/Oxford University, 2011. ISBN 0-19-811182-7

=== Other books ===
- (with Peter Dronke). Barbara et Antiquissima Carmina. Publicaciones del Seminario de Literatura Medieval y Humanística. Barcelona: Universidad Autónoma, Faculdad de Letras, 1977. ISBN 84-600-0992-0
- The Role of Sexual Themes in Njáls Saga: The Dorothea Coke Memorial Lecture in Northern Studies delivered at University College London, 27 May 1980. London: Viking Society for Northern Research, 1981. (pdf)
- Myth and Fiction in Early Norse Lands. Collected Studies 524. Aldershot, Hampshire/Brookfield, Vermont: Variorum, 1996. ISBN 0-86078-545-9 (Collected articles)
- (with Peter Dronke). Growth of Literature: The Sea and the God of the Sea. H.M. Chadwick Memorial Lectures 8. Cambridge: Department of Anglo-Saxon, Norse and Celtic, 1997-98. ISBN 978-0-9532697-0-9

=== Articles ===
- (with Peter Dronke). "The Prologue of the Prose Edda: Explorations of a Latin Background". Sjötíu ritgerðir helgaðar Jakobi Benediktssyni 20. júlí 1977. Ed. Einar G. Pétursson and Jónas Kristjánsson. Reykjavík: Stofnun Árna Magnússonar, 1977. 153-76.
- "The War of the Æsir and the Vanir in Völuspá". Idee, Gestalt, Geschichte: Festschrift Klaus von See. Ed. Gerd Wolfgang Weber. Odense: Odense University, 1988. ISBN 87-7492-697-7. 223-38.
- "Eddic Poetry as a Source for the History of Germanic Religion". Germanische Religionsgeschichte: Quellen und Quellenprobleme. Ed. Heinrich Beck, Detlev Ellmers and Kurt Schier. Ergänzungsbände zum Reallexikon der germanischen Altertumskunde 5. Berlin: De Gruyter, 1992. ISBN 3-11-012872-1. 656-84.
- "Pagan Beliefs and Christian Impact: The Contribution of Eddic Studies". Viking Revaluations: Viking Society Centenary Symposium. Ed. Anthony Faulkes and Patrick Thull. London: Viking Society for Northern Research, 1993. ISBN 0-903521-28-8

== Relevant literature ==
- C.A.L. Ursula Dronke (Obituary). Saga-Book XXXVI:117-120
