= Old Norse =

North Germanic language

- Old Nordic; Old Scandinavian
- dǫnsk tunga 'Danish tongue' norrǿnt mál 'Northern speech'
- Native to: Scandinavia, Iceland, Faroe Islands, Greenland and other Norse settlements
- Region: Nordic countries, Great Britain, Ireland, Isle of Man, Normandy, Newfoundland, the Volga and places in-between
- Ethnicity: Danes, Icelanders, Norwegians, and Swedes
- Era: Evolved from Proto-Norse in the 8th century, and developed into the various North Germanic languages by the 15th century
- Language family: Indo-European: Germanic; North Germanic; Old Norse
- Early form: Proto-Norse (attested)
- Writing system: Runic, later Latin (Old Norse alphabet)

Language codes
- ISO 639-2: non
- ISO 639-3: non
- Glottolog: oldn1244

Old Norse was a North Germanic language spoken in Scandinavia and in Norse settlements during the Viking Age and the early Middle Ages (approximately the 8th–14th centuries). It is the conventional term for the medieval West and East Scandinavian dialects (often labelled Old West Norse and Old East Norse) that developed from Proto-Norse and later evolved into the modern North Germanic languages, including Icelandic, Faroese, Norwegian, Danish, and Swedish.

Old Norse is attested in runic inscriptions (written in the Younger Futhark) and in numerous medieval manuscripts written with the Latin alphabet; its literary corpus includes the Poetic Edda, the Prose Edda, the Icelandic sagas, skaldic verse, law codes, and religious texts. Contact between Old Norse speakers and other languages — particularly Old English and the Celtic languages — left a substantial legacy of loanwords and toponyms; many common English words such as egg, knife, sky, and window derive from Old Norse.

Scholarly usage of the term Old Norse typically covers texts from the 11th to the 14th centuries, though periodization varies within academia based on the theoretical focus and tradition of the particular source.

== Geographical distribution ==
The approximate extent of Old Norse and related languages in the early 10th century: Old West Norse dialect Old East Norse dialect Old Gutnish dialect Old English Crimean Gothic Other Germanic languages with which Old Norse still retained some mutual intelligibility

Old Icelandic was close to Old Norwegian, and together they formed Old West Norse, which was also spoken in Norse settlements in Greenland, the Faroes, Ireland, Scotland, the Isle of Man, northwest England (particularly Cumbria), and Normandy. Old East Norse was spoken in Denmark, Sweden, Kievan Rus', eastern England, and Danish settlements in Normandy. The Old Gutnish dialect was spoken in Gotland and in various settlements in the East.

In the 11th century, Old Norse was the most widely spoken European language, ranging from Vinland in the West to the Volga River in the East. In Kievan Rus', it survived the longest in Veliky Novgorod, probably lasting into the 14th century there. The age of the Swedish-speaking population of Finland is strongly contested, but Swedish settlement had spread the language into the region by the time of the Second Swedish Crusade in the 13th century at the latest.

== Modern descendants ==
The modern descendants of the Old West Norse dialect are the West Scandinavian languages of Icelandic, Faroese, Norwegian, and the extinct Norn language of Orkney and Shetland, although Norwegian was heavily influenced by the East dialect, and is today more similar to East Scandinavian (Danish and Swedish) than to Icelandic and Faroese. The descendants of the Old East Norse dialect are the East Scandinavian languages of Danish, Swedish and Övdalian, although Övdalian was heavily influenced by the West Dialect, and is sometimes considered to form its own group.

Among these, the grammar of Icelandic, Faroese and Övdalian have changed the least from Old Norse in the last thousand years, though the pronunciations of Icelandic and Faroese both have changed considerably from Old Norse. With Danish rule of the Faroe Islands, Faroese has also been influenced by Danish.

Both Middle English (especially northern English dialects within the area of the Danelaw) and Early Scots (including Lowland Scots) were strongly influenced by Norse and contained many Old Norse loanwords. Consequently, Modern English (including Scottish English), inherited a significant proportion of its vocabulary directly from Norse.

The development of Norman French was also influenced by Norse. Through Norman, to a smaller extent, so was modern French.

Written modern Icelandic derives from the Old Norse phonemic writing system. Contemporary Icelandic-speakers can read Old Norse, which varies slightly in spelling as well as semantics and word order. However, pronunciation, particularly of the vowel phonemes, has changed at least as much in Icelandic as in the other North Germanic languages.

Faroese retains many similarities but is influenced by Danish, Norwegian, and Gaelic. Although Swedish, Danish and Norwegian have diverged the most, they still retain considerable mutual intelligibility. Speakers of modern Swedish, Norwegian and Danish can mostly understand each other without studying their neighboring languages, particularly if speaking slowly. The languages are also sufficiently similar in writing that they can mostly be understood across borders. This could be because these languages have been mutually affected by each other, as well as having a similar development influenced by Middle Low German.

=== Other influenced languages ===
Various languages unrelated to Old Norse and others not closely related have been heavily influenced by Norse, particularly the Norman language; to a lesser extent, Finnish and Estonian. Russian, Ukrainian, Belarusian, Lithuanian and Latvian also have a few Norse loanwords. The words Rus and Russia, according to one theory, may be named after the Rus' people, a Norse tribe, probably from present-day east-central Sweden. The current Finnish and Estonian words for Sweden are Ruotsi and Rootsi, respectively.

A number of loanwords have been introduced into Irish, many associated with fishing and sailing. A similar influence is found in Scottish Gaelic, with over one hundred loanwords estimated to be in the language, many of which are related to fishing and sailing.

== Phonology ==
=== Vowels ===
Old Norse vowel phonemes mostly come in pairs of long and short. The standardized orthography marks the long vowels with an acute accent. In medieval manuscripts, it is often unmarked but sometimes marked with an accent or through gemination.

Jackson Crawford speaking Old Norse

Old Norse had nasalized versions of all ten vowel qualities. These occurred as allophones of the vowels before nasal consonants and in places where a nasal had followed it in an older form of the word, before it was absorbed into a neighboring sound. If the nasal was absorbed by a stressed vowel, it would also lengthen the vowel. This nasalization also occurred in the other Germanic languages, but were not retained long. They were noted in the First Grammatical Treatise, and otherwise might have remained unknown. The First Grammarian marked these with a dot above the letter. This notation did not catch on, and would soon be obsolete. Nasal and oral vowels probably merged around the 11th century in most of Old East Norse. However, the distinction still holds in Dalecarlian dialects. The dots in the following vowel table separate the oral from nasal phonemes.

Generic vowel system c. 9th–12th centuries
	Front vowels				Back vowels			
	Unrounded		Rounded		Unrounded		Rounded	
Close	i • ĩ	iː • ĩː	y • ỹ	yː • ỹː			u • ũ	uː • ũː
Mid	e • ẽ	eː • ẽː	ø • ø̃	øː • ø̃ː			o • õ	oː • õː
Open/Open-mid	ɛ • ɛ̃	ɛː • ɛ̃ː	œ • œ̃		a • ã	aː • ãː	ɔ • ɔ̃	ɔː • ɔ̃ː

Note: The open or open-mid vowels may be transcribed differently:

- /æ/ = /ɛ/
- /ɒ/ = /ɔ/
- /ɑ/ = /a/

Sometime around the 13th century, /ɔ/ (spelled ⟨ǫ⟩) merged with /ø/ or /o/ in most dialects except Old Danish, and Icelandic where /ɔ/ (ǫ) merged with /ø/. This can be determined by their distinction within the 12th-century First Grammatical Treatise but not within the early 13th-century Prose Edda. The nasal vowels, also noted in the First Grammatical Treatise, are assumed to have been lost in most dialects by this time (but notably they are retained in Elfdalian and other dialects of Ovansiljan). See Old Icelandic for the mergers of /øː/ (spelled ⟨œ⟩) with /ɛː/ (spelled ⟨æ⟩) and /ɛ/ (spelled ⟨ę⟩) with /e/ (spelled ⟨e⟩).

Generic vowel system c. 13th–14th centuries
	Front vowels				Back vowels			
	Unrounded		Rounded		Unrounded		Rounded	
High	i	iː	y	yː			u	uː
Mid	e	eː	ø	øː			o	oː
Low/Low-mid	ɛ	ɛː			a	aː		

Old Norse had three diphthong phonemes: /ɛi/, /ɔu/, /øy ~ ɛy/ (spelled ⟨ei⟩, ⟨au⟩, ⟨ey⟩ respectively). In East Norse these would monophthongize and merge with /eː/ and /øː/, whereas in West Norse and its descendants the diphthongs remained.

History of Old Norse and Old Icelandic vowels
Proto-Germanic	Northwest Germanic	Primitive Old West Norse	Old Icelandic (1st Grammarian)	Later Old Icelandic	Example (Old Norse)
*a *[ɑ]	*a	a ; ⟨a⟩	a	a	land 'land' < *landą
*a *[ɑ]	*a (+i-mut)	ɛ ; ⟨ę⟩	e ; ⟨e⟩	e	menn 'men' < *manniz
*a *[ɑ]	*a (+u/w-mut)	ɔ ; ⟨ǫ⟩	ɔ	ø ; ⟨ö⟩	lǫnd 'lands' < *landu < *landō ; sǫngr 'song' < sǫngr < *sangwaz
*a *[ɑ]	*a (+i-mut +w-mut)	œ ; ⟨ø₂⟩	ø	ø ; ⟨ö⟩	gøra 'to make' < *garwijaną
*ē *[æː]	*aː	aː ; ⟨á⟩	aː	aː	láta 'to let' < *lētaną
*ē *[æː]	*aː (+i-mut)	ɛː ; ⟨æ⟩	ɛː	ɛː	mæla 'to speak' < *mālijan < *mēlijaną
*ē *[æː]	*aː (+u-mut)	ɔː ; ⟨ǫ́⟩	ɔː	aː ; ⟨á⟩	mǫ́l 'meals' < *mālu < *mēlō
*e	*e	e ; ⟨e⟩	e	e	sex 'six' < *seks ; bresta 'to burst' < *brestaną
*e	*e (+u/w-mut)	ø ; ⟨ø₁⟩	ø	ø ; ⟨ö⟩	tøgr 'ten' < *teguz
*e	*e (broken)	ea ; ⟨ea⟩	ja ; ⟨ja⟩	ja	gjalda 'to repay' < *geldaną
*e	*e (broken + u/w-mut)	eo ~ io ; ⟨eo ~ io⟩	jo > jɔ ; ⟨jǫ⟩	jø ; ⟨jö⟩	skjǫldr 'shield' < *skelduz
*ē₂ *[eː]	*eː	eː ; ⟨é⟩	eː	eː	lét 'to let pst' < *lē₂t
*i	*i	i ; ⟨i⟩	i	i	mikill 'great' < *mikilaz
*i	*i (+w-mut)	y ; ⟨y⟩	y	y(ː)	slyngva 'to sling' < *slingwaną
*ī	*iː	iː ; ⟨í⟩	iː	iː	líta 'to look' < *lītaną
*ō [ɔː] /*ā *[ɑː]	*oː	oː ; ⟨ó⟩	oː	oː	fór 'went' < *fōr ; mót 'meeting' < *mōtą
*ō [ɔː] /*ā *[ɑː]	*oː (+i-mut)	øː ; ⟨œ⟩	øː	ɛː ; ⟨æ⟩	mœðr 'mothers' < *mōdriz
*u	*u	u ; ⟨u⟩	u	u	una 'to be content' < *unaną
*u	*u (+i-mut)	y ; ⟨y⟩	y	y	kyn 'race' < *kunją
*u	*u (+a-mut)	o ; ⟨o⟩	o	o	fogl/fugl 'bird' < *fuglaz ; morginn 'morning' < *murginaz
*ū	*uː	uː ; ⟨ú⟩	uː	uː	drúpa 'to droop' < *drūpaną
*ū	*uː (+i-mut)	yː ; ⟨ý⟩	yː	yː	mýss 'mice' < *mūsiz
*ai *[ɑi̯]	*ai	ai > ɛi ; ⟨ei⟩	ɛi	ɛi	bein, Gut. bain 'bone' < *bainą
*ai *[ɑi̯]	*ai (+w-mut)	øy ; ⟨ey ~ øy⟩	øy ; ⟨ey⟩	ɛy	kveykva 'to kindle' < *kwaikwaną
*au *[ɑu̯]	*au	au > ɔu ; ⟨au⟩	ɔu	øy	lauss 'loose' < *lausaz
*au *[ɑu̯]	*au (+i-mut)	øy ; ⟨ey ~ øy⟩	øy ; ⟨ey⟩	ɛy	leysa 'to loosen' < *lausijaną
*eu	*eu	eu ; ⟨eu⟩	juː ; ⟨jú⟩	juː	djúpr 'deep' < *deupaz
*eu	*eu (+dental)	eo ; ⟨eo⟩	joː ; ⟨jó⟩	juː ; ⟨jú⟩	bjóða/bjúða 'to offer' < *beudaną
*V̨	*Ṽ	Ṽ	Ṽ	V	komȧ < *kwemaną 'to come, arrive' ; OWN vėtr/vėttr < vintr < *wintruz 'winter'
*V̨̄	*Ṽː	Ṽː	Ṽː	Vː	hȧ́r 'shark' < *hanhaz ; ȯ́rar 'our' (pl.) < *unseraz ; ø̇́rȧ 'younger' (acc. neut. wk.) < *junhizą

=== Consonants ===
Old Norse has six plosive phonemes, /p/ being rare word-initially and /d/ and /b/ pronounced as voiced fricative allophones between vowels except in compound words (e.g. veðrabati), already in the Proto-Germanic language (e.g. *b *[β] > [v] between vowels). The /ɡ/ phoneme was pronounced as [ɡ] after an /n/ or another /ɡ/ and as [k] before /s/ and /t/. Some accounts have it as a voiced velar fricative [ɣ] in all cases, and others have that realisation only in the middle of words and between vowels (with it otherwise being realised [ɡ]). The Old East Norse /ʀ/ was an apical consonant, with its precise position unknown. It is reconstructed by some as a palatal sibilant. It descended from Proto-Germanic *z and eventually developed into /r/, as had already occurred in Old West Norse.

	Labial	Coronal		Dorsal		Glottal
	Labial	Dental	Alveolar	Palatal	Velar	Glottal
Nasal	m	n		(ŋ)		
Plosive	p b	t d		k ɡ		
Fricative	f (v)	θ (ð)	s ʀ (Note: Reconstructed as [ɹ̠˔] when part of the stem of a word, with a voiceless allophone [ɹ̠̊˔] word-finally when not part of the stem.)	(x) (ɣ)		h
Trill			r			
Glide				j	w	
Lateral		l				

The pronunciation of ⟨hv⟩ is unclear, but it may have been [xʷ] (the assumed Proto-Germanic pronunciation), [hʷ] or the similar phoneme [ʍ]. Unlike the three other digraphs, it was retained much longer in all dialects. Without ever developing into a voiceless sonorant in Icelandic, it instead underwent fortition to a plosive [kv], which suggests that instead of being a voiceless sonorant, it retained a stronger frication. In some Icelandic dialects it is still preserved as [xʷ] or [xv].

=== Accent ===
Old Norse had a stress accent with primary stress generally on the first syllable of the word, a feature reflected particularly in the conservative modern descendants Icelandic and Faroese. It is also usually thought that a contrastive prosodic feature—generally reconstructed as a pitch or tonal distinction—was already forming either in late Proto-Norse or, at the latest, in early Old Norse, and that it is reflected in the modern Swedish and Norwegian tonal accents (traditionally called Accent 1 and Accent 2). In Danish the modern output of this contrast is, in many varieties, a creaky-voice register called stød.

The emergence of the tonal contrast as a lexical feature is commonly linked to the rise of new disyllabic words due to incorporation of the definite article and vowel epenthesis during the Viking Age and early Middle Ages. However, the precise dating and mechanism of the rise of the contrast remains debated among scholars. Some studies interpret the process as a phonologization of earlier (Proto-Nordic) rhythmic contrasts involving syllable weight, with vowel length changes and the reduction of unstressed syllables resulting in an inherited double-peaked melody during the Viking Age. Others argue for a "peak delay" model of tonal development.

It has been somewhat controversial whether a lexicalised two-way tonal distinction like the one found across much of mainland Norway and Sweden has ever existed in Icelandic, mostly due to the dearth of unambiguous data, although it is often assumed that it did exist and was subsequently lost. It has been argued that evidence of its former existence is preserved, inter alia, in late medieval Icelandic rhyming patterns and in some passages of the Third Grammatical Treatise. As for Faroese, older accounts like Hægstad (1916) did report a tonal distinction but later (as early as 18 years later) works did not. (Note: Danish influence being the primary hypothesis advanced in Selmer (1924).)

Primary stress in Old Norse falls on the word stem, so that hyrjar would be pronounced /ˈhyrjar/. In compound words, secondary stress falls on the second stem (e.g. lærisveinn, /ˈlɛːɾiˌswɛinː/).

== Orthography ==
Unlike Proto-Norse, which was written with the Elder Futhark, runic Old Norse was originally written with the Younger Futhark, which had only 16 letters. Because of the limited number of runes, several runes were used for different sounds, and long and short vowels were not distinguished in writing. Medieval runes came into use some time later.

As for the Latin alphabet, there was no standardized orthography in use in the Middle Ages. A modified version of the letter wynn called vend was used briefly for the sounds /u/, /v/, and /w/. Long vowels were sometimes marked with acutes but also sometimes left unmarked or geminated. The standardized Old Norse spelling was created in the 19th century and is, for the most part, phonemic. The most notable deviation is that the nonphonemic difference between the voiced and the voiceless dental fricative is marked. The oldest texts and runic inscriptions use þ exclusively. Long vowels are denoted with acutes. Most other letters are written with the same glyph as the IPA phoneme's grapheme, except as shown in the above tables.

== Phonological processes ==
=== Ablaut ===
Ablaut patterns are groups of vowels which are swapped, or ablauted, in the nucleus of a word. Strong verbs ablaut the lemma's nucleus to derive the past forms of the verb. This parallels English conjugation, where, e.g., the nucleus of sing becomes sang in the past tense and sung in the past participle. Some verbs are derived by ablaut, as the present-in-past verbs do by consequence of being derived from the past tense forms of strong verbs.

=== Umlaut ===
Umlaut or mutation is an assimilatory process acting on vowels preceding a vowel or semivowel of a different vowel backness. In the case of i-umlaut and ʀ-umlaut, this entails a fronting of back vowels, with retention of lip rounding. In the case of u-umlaut, this entails labialization of unrounded vowels. Umlaut is phonemic and in many situations grammatically significant as a side effect of losing the Proto-Germanic morphological suffixes whose vowels created the umlaut allophones.

Some /y/, /yː/, /ø/, /øː/, /ɛ/, /ɛː/, /øy/, and all /ɛi/ were obtained by i-umlaut from /u/, /uː/, /o/, /oː/, /a/, /aː/, /au/, and /ai/ respectively. Others were formed via ʀ-umlaut from /u/, /uː/, /a/, /aː/, and /au/.

Some /y/, /yː/, /ø/, /øː/, and all /ɔ/, /ɔː/ were obtained by u-umlaut from /i/, /iː/, /e/, /eː/, and /a/, /aː/ respectively. See Old Icelandic for information on /ɔː/.

/œ/ was obtained through a simultaneous u- and i-umlaut of /a/. It appears in words like gera (gøra, gjǫra, geyra), from Proto-Germanic *garwijaną, and commonly in verbs with a velar consonant before the suffix like søkkva < *sankwijaną. (Note: Cleasby & Vigfússon 1874, pp. 761–762 (Introduction to Letter Ö (Ø)))

OEN often preserves the original value of the vowel directly preceding runic (ᛉ, ʀ) while OWN receives ʀ-umlaut. Compare runic OEN glaʀ, haʀi, hrauʀ with OWN gler, heri (later héri), hrøyrr/hreyrr 'glass', 'hare', 'pile of rocks'.

==== U-umlaut ====
U-umlaut is more common in Old West Norse in both phonemic and allophonic positions, while it only occurs sparsely in post-runic Old East Norse and even in runic Old East Norse.

Comparison demonstrating U-Umlaut in Swedish
Meaning	West Old Norse	Old Swedish^{[1]}	Modern Swedish		Icelandic	
Meaning	West Old Norse	Old Swedish^{[1]}	Transcription	IPA	Transcription	IPA
Guardian / Caretaker	vǫrðr	varþer	vård	[voːɖ]	vörður	[ˈvœrðʏr]
Eagle	ǫrn	ørn	örn	[œːɳ]	örn	[œrtn]
Earth	jǫrð	iorþ	jord^{[2]}	[juːɖ]	jörð	[jœrð]
Milk	mjǫlk	miolk	mjölk^{[2]}	[mjœlk]	mjólk	[mjoul̥k]

Old Swedish orthography uses ⟨þ⟩ to represent both /ð/ and /θ/. The change from Norse ⟨ð⟩ to Old Swedish ⟨þ⟩ represents only a change in orthography rather than a change in sound. Similarly ⟨i⟩ is used in place of ⟨j⟩. And thus changes from Norse ⟨j⟩ to Old Swedish ⟨i⟩ to Swedish ⟨j⟩ should be viewed as a change in orthography.
Represents the u-umlaut found in Swedish.

This is still a major difference between Swedish and Faroese and Icelandic today. Plurals of neuters do not have u-umlaut at all in Swedish, but in Faroese and Icelandic they do. For example, the Faroese and Icelandic plurals of land: lond and lönd respectively, in contrast to Swedish land. That also applies to almost all feminine nouns, for example the largest feminine noun group, the o-stem nouns (except the Swedish noun jord mentioned above), and even i-stem nouns and root nouns, such as Old West Norse mǫrk (mörk in Icelandic) in comparison with Modern and Old Swedish mark.

=== Breaking ===
Vowel breaking, or fracture, caused a front vowel to be split into a semivowel-vowel sequence before a back vowel in the following syllable. While West Norse only broke /e/, East Norse also broke /i/. The change was blocked by a /w/, /l/, or /ʀ/ preceding the potentially-broken vowel.

=== Assimilation or elision of inflectional ʀ ===
When a noun, pronoun, adjective, or verb has a long vowel or diphthong in the accented syllable and its stem ends in a single l, n, or s, the r (or the elder r- or z-variant ʀ) in an ending is assimilated. (Note: Cleasby & Vigfússon 1874, p. xvi "Strong Nouns" – Masculine – Remarks on the 1st Strong Masculine Declension, 3.a) When the accented vowel is short, the ending is dropped.

The nominative of the strong masculine declension and some i-stem feminine nouns uses one such -r (ʀ). Óðin-r (Óðin-ʀ) becomes Óðinn instead of *Óðinr (*Óðinʀ).

The verb blása 'to blow', has third person present tense blæss '[he] blows' rather than *blæsr (*blæsʀ). Similarly, the verb skína 'to shine' had present tense third person skínn (rather than *skínr, *skínʀ) ; while kala 'to cool down' had present tense third person kell (rather than *kelr, *kelʀ).

The rule is not absolute, with certain counter-examples such as vinr 'friend', which has the synonym vin, yet retains the unabsorbed version, and jǫtunn 'giant', where assimilation takes place even though the root vowel, ǫ, is short.

The clusters */Clʀ, Csʀ, Cnʀ, Crʀ/ cannot yield */Clː, Csː, Cnː, Crː/ respectively, instead /Cl, Cs, Cn, Cr/. The effect of this shortening can result in the lack of distinction between some forms of the noun. In the case of vetr 'winter', the nominative and accusative singular and plural forms are identical. The nominative singular and nominative and accusative plural would otherwise have been OWN *vetrr, OEN *wintrʀ. These forms are impossible because the cluster */Crʀ/ cannot be realized as /Crː/, nor as */Crʀ/, nor as */Cʀː/. The same shortening as in vetr also occurs in lax = laks 'salmon' (as opposed to *lakss, *laksʀ), botn 'bottom' (as opposed to *botnn, *botnʀ), and jarl (as opposed to *jarll, *jarlʀ).

Furthermore, wherever the cluster */rʀ/ is expected to exist, such as in the male names Ragnarr, Steinarr (supposedly *Ragnarʀ, *Steinarʀ), the result is apparently always /rː/ rather than */rʀ/ or */ʀː/. This is observable in the Runic corpus.

== Phonotactics ==
=== Blocking of ii, uu ===
In Old Norse, i/j adjacent to i, e, their u-umlauts, and æ was not possible, nor u/v adjacent to u, o, their i-umlauts, and ǫ. At the beginning of words, this manifested as a dropping of the initial /j/ (which was general, independent of the following vowel) or /v/. Compare ON orð, úlfr, ár with English word, wolf, year. In inflections, this manifested as the dropping of the inflectional vowels. Thus, klæði + dat -i remains klæði, and sjáum in Icelandic progressed to sjǫ́um > sjǫ́m > sjám. The *jj and *ww of Proto-Germanic became ggj and ggv respectively in Old Norse, a change known as Holtzmann's law.

=== Epenthesis ===
An epenthetic vowel became popular by 1200 in Old Danish, 1250 in Old Swedish and Old Norwegian, and 1300 in Old Icelandic. An unstressed vowel was used which varied by dialect. Old Norwegian exhibited all three: /u/ was used in West Norwegian south of Bergen, as in aftur, aftor (older aptr); North of Bergen, /i/ appeared in aftir, after; and East Norwegian used /a/, after, aftær.

== Grammar ==
Old Norse was a moderately inflected language with high levels of nominal and verbal inflection. Most of the fused morphemes are retained in modern Icelandic, especially in regard to noun case declensions, whereas modern Norwegian in comparison has moved towards more analytical word structures.

=== Gender ===
Old Norse had three grammatical genders – masculine, feminine, and neuter. Adjectives and pronouns referring to a noun must agree in gender with that noun, so that one says, "gamal maðr" 'old man' but "gǫmul kona" 'old woman' and "gamalt hús" 'old house'. As in most languages, grammatical gender is largely unrelated to biological sex (in animals) and often also in social gender in humans. While indeed karl, 'man' is masculine, kona, 'woman', is feminine, and hús, 'house', is neuter, so also are hrafn and kráka, for 'raven' and 'crow', masculine and feminine respectively, even in reference to a female raven or a male crow. Some words related to humans, such as barn, 'child' are neuter regardless of the gender of the person.

All neuter words have identical nominative and accusative forms, and all feminine words have identical nominative and accusative plurals.

The gender of some words' plurals does not agree with that of their singulars, such as lim and mund. (Note: Cleasby & Vigfússon 1874, p. 389 col.1, "LIM"; p. 437, col.1 "MUND") Some words, such as hungr, have multiple genders, evidenced by their determiners being declined in different genders within a given sentence.

=== Morphology ===
Nouns, adjectives, and pronouns were declined in four grammatical cases – nominative, accusative, genitive, and dative – in singular and plural numbers. Adjectives and pronouns were additionally declined in three grammatical genders. Some pronouns (first and second person) could have dual number in addition to singular and plural. The genitive was used partitively and in compounds and kennings (e.g., Urðarbrunnr, 'the well of Urðr' ; Lokasenna, 'the flyting of Loki').

There were several classes of nouns within each gender. The following is an example of the "strong" inflectional paradigms:

The strong masculine noun armr, English 'arm'
	Singular	Plural
Nom	armr	armar
Acc	arm	arma
Gen	arms	arma
Dat	armi	ǫrmum / armum

The feminine noun hǫll (OWN), hall (OEN), English 'hall'
		Old West Norse	Old East Norse
Nom- Acc	Singular	hǫll	hall
Nom- Acc	Plural	hallir	hallar
Gen	Singular	hallar	
Gen	Plural	halla	
Dat	Singular	hǫllu	hallu
Dat	Plural	hǫllum	hallum

The neuter noun troll, English 'troll'
	Singular	Plural
Nom-Acc	troll	
Gen	trolls	trolla
Dat	trolli	trollum

The numerous "weak" noun paradigms had a much higher degree of syncretism between the different cases : i.e. they had fewer forms than the "strong" nouns.

A definite article was appended as a suffix that retained an independent declension : e.g., troll 'a troll' – trollit 'the troll', hǫll 'a hall' – hǫllin 'the hall', armr 'an arm' – armrinn 'the arm'. This definite article, however, was a separate word and did not become attached to the noun before later stages of the Old Norse period.

== Derivation of Old Norse from Proto-Germanic ==
=== Male common noun ===
*wulfaz > Proto-Norse *wulfaʀ > ulfr ("wolf")
Case	PG (singular)	ON (singular)	PG (plural)	ON (plural)
NOM	*wulfaz	ulfr (indef.)	*wulfōz, -ōs	ulfar (indef.)
GEN	*wulfas	ulfs	*wulfǫ̂	ulfa
DAT	*wulfai	ulfi	*wulfamaz	ulfum
ACC	*wulfą	ulf	*wulfanz	ulfa
VOC	*wulf	-	*wulfōz, -ōs	-
INSTR	*wulfō	-	*wulfamiz	-

=== Female common noun ===
*badwō > Proto-Norse *badwō? > bǫð ("battle")
Case	PG (singular)	ON (singular)	PG (plural)	ON (plural)
NOM	*badwō	bǫð (indef.)	*badwôz	bǫðvar (indef.)
GEN	*badwōz	bǫðvar	*badwǫ̂	bǫðva
DAT	*badwōi	bǫð(u)	*badwōmaz	bǫðum
ACC	*badwǭ	bǫð	*badwōz	bǫðvar
VOC	*badwō	-	*badwôz	-
INSTR	*badwō	-	*badwōmiz	-

=== Neuter common noun ===
*juką > ok ("yoke")
Case	PG (singular)	ON (singular)	PG (plural)	ON (plural)
NOM	*juką	ok (indef.)	*jukō	ok (indef.)
GEN	*jukas	oks	*jukǫ̂	oka
DAT	*jukai	oki	*jukamaz	okum
ACC	*juką	ok	*jukō	ok
VOC	*juką	-	*jukō	-
INSTR	*jukō	-	*jukamiz	-

=== Pronouns ===
Proto-Germanic	Old Norse
*ek	ek
*þū	þú
*iz, *sī, *it ?, ?, ?	er, es; ?, ? PN *hanaʀ > hann; PN *hanu > hǫ́n (hon, hón); PN þat > þat
*wīz	PN *wiʀ > vīr?
*jūz	PN *jiʀ > īr?
*īz, ijōz, *ijō; *þai, *þôz, *þō	?; PN þaiʀ > þeir; PN þᴀiᴀʀ > þær; þau

=== Verbs ===
*beraną > bera ("to bear/carry")
Pronoun	PG	ON
I	*berō	ber
You	*birizi	berr
He, she, it	*biridi	berr
We	*beramaz	berum
You (all)	*birid	berið
They	*berandi	bera

*wesaną > vesa (vera) ("to be")
Pronoun	PG	ON
I	*immi	em
You	*izi	est (ert)
He, she, it	*isti	es (er)
We	*izum	erum
You (all)	*izud	eruð
They	*sindi	eru

=== Numbers ===
Number	PG	ON
1	*ainaz	PN *ainaʀ > einn
2	*twai	tveir
3	*þrīz	PN þrijoʀ > þrír
4	*fedwōr	fjóðrir > fjórir (fjǫgurir)
5	*fimf	fimm
6	*sehs	sex (sjax)
7	*sebun	*seaβun > *seaβu > sjau
8	*ahtōu	átta
9	*newun	PN niu > niu (nio)
10	*tehun	tíu

== Texts ==
The earliest inscriptions in Old Norse are runic, from the 8th century. Runes continued to be commonly used until the 15th century and have been recorded to be in use in some form as late as the 19th century in some parts of Sweden. With the conversion to Christianity in the 11th century came the Latin alphabet. The oldest preserved texts in Old Norse in the Latin alphabet date from the middle of the 12th century. Subsequently, Old Norse became the vehicle of a large and varied body of vernacular literature. Most of the surviving literature was written in Iceland. Best known are the Norse sagas, the Icelanders' sagas and the mythological literature, but there also survives a large body of religious literature, translations into Old Norse of courtly romances, classical mythology, and the Old Testament, as well as instructional material, grammatical treatises and a large body of letters and official documents.

== Dialects ==
Most of the innovations that appeared in Old Norse spread evenly through the Old Norse area. As a result, the dialects were similar and considered to be the same language, a language that they sometimes called the Danish tongue (Dǫnsk tunga), sometimes Norse language (Norrœnt mál), as evidenced in the following two quotes from Heimskringla by Snorri Sturluson:

Móðir Dyggva var Drótt, dóttir Danps konungs, sonar Rígs er fyrstr var konungr kallaðr á danska tungu.

— Heimskringla, Ynglinga saga § 20. Dauði Dyggva
Translation:

Dyggvi's mother was Drott, the daughter of king Danp, Ríg's son, who was the first to be called king in the Danish tongue.

...stirt var honum norrœnt mál, ok kylfdi mᴊǫk til orðanna, ok hǫfðu margir menn þat mᴊǫk at spotti.

— Heimskringla, Saga Sigurðar Jórsalafara, Eysteins ok Ólafs § 35(34). Frá veðjan Haralds ok Magnús
Translation:

...the Norse language was hard for him, and he often fumbled for words, which amused people greatly.

However, some changes were geographically limited and so created a dialectal difference between Old West Norse and Old East Norse.

As Proto-Norse evolved into Old Norse, in the 8th century, the effects of the umlauts seem to have been very much the same over the whole Old Norse area. But in later dialects of the language a split occurred mainly between west and east as the use of umlauts began to vary. The typical umlauts (for example fylla < *fullijan) were better preserved in the West due to later generalizations in the east where many instances of umlaut were removed (many archaic Eastern texts as well as eastern runic inscriptions however portray the same extent of umlauts as in later Western Old Norse).

All the while, the changes resulting in breaking (for example hiarta < *hertō) were more influential in the East probably once again due to generalizations within the inflectional system. This difference was one of the greatest reasons behind the dialectalization that took place in the 9th and 10th centuries, shaping an Old West Norse dialect in Norway and the Atlantic settlements and an Old East Norse dialect in Denmark and Sweden.

Old West Norse and Old Gutnish did not take part in the monophthongization which changed æi (ei) into ē, øy (ey) and au into ø̄, nor did certain peripheral dialects of Swedish, as seen in modern Ostrobothnian dialects. Another difference was that Old West Norse lost certain combinations of consonants. The combinations -mp-, -nt-, and -nk- were assimilated into -pp-, -tt- and -kk- in Old West Norse, but this phenomenon was limited in Old East Norse.

Here is a comparison between the two dialects as well as Old Gutnish. It is a transcription from one of the Funbo Runestones in Sweden (U 990) from the eleventh century:

Veðr ok Þegn ok Gunnarr reistu stein þenna at Haursa, fǫður sinn. Guð hjalpi ǫnd hans.
Weðr ok Þegn ok Gunnarr ræistu stæin þenna at Haursa, faður sinn. Guð hialpi and hans
Weðr ok Þegn ok Gunnarr raistu stain þenna at Haursa, faður sinn. Guð hialpi and hans
translation: 'Veðr and Thegn and Gunnar raised this stone after Haursi, their father. God help his spirit'

The OEN original text above is transliterated according to traditional scholarly methods, wherein u-umlaut is not regarded in runic Old East Norse. Modern studies have shown that the positions where it applies are the same as for runic Old West Norse. An alternative and probably more accurate transliteration would therefore render the text in OEN as such:

Weðr ok Þegn ok Gunnarr ræistu stæin þenna at Haursa, fǫður sinn. Guð hialpi ǫnd hans (OEN)

Some past participles and other words underwent i-umlaut in Old West Norse but not in Old East Norse dialects. Examples of that are Icelandic slegið/sleginn and tekið/tekinn, which in Swedish are slagit/slagen and tagit/tagen. This can also be seen in the Icelandic and Norwegian words sterkur and sterk 'strong', which in Swedish is stark as in Old Swedish. These differences can also be seen in comparison between Norwegian and Swedish.

=== Old West Norse ===
Old West Norse is by far the best attested variety of Old Norse. The term Old Norse is often used to refer to Old West Norse specifically, in which case the broader subject receives another name, such as Old Scandinavian. Another designation is Old West Nordic.

The combinations -mp-, -nt-, and -nk- mostly merged to -pp-, -tt- and -kk- in Old West Norse around the 7th century, marking the first distinction between the Eastern and Western dialects. The following table illustrates this:

English	Old West Norse	Old East Norse	Proto-Norse
mushroom	s(v)ǫppr	swampʀ	*swampuz
steep	brattr	brantʀ	*brantaz
widow	ekkja	ænkija	*ain(a)kjōn
to shrink	kreppa	krimpa	*krimpan
to sprint	spretta	sprinta	*sprintan
to sink	søkkva	sænkwa	*sankwijan

An early difference between Old West Norse and the other dialects was that Old West Norse has the forms bú 'dwelling', kú 'cow acc' and trú 'faith', whereas Old East Norse has bó, kó and tró. Old West Norse is also characterized by the preservation of u-umlaut, which meant that, for example, Proto-Norse *tanþu 'tooth' became tǫnn and not tann as in post-runic Old East Norse; one finds OWN gǫ́s and runic OEN gǫ́s, while post-runic OEN has gás 'goose'.

The earliest body of text appears in runic inscriptions and in poems composed c. 900 by Þjóðólfr of Hvinir (although the poems are not preserved in contemporary sources, but only in much later manuscripts). The earliest manuscripts are from the period 1150–1200 and concern legal, religious and historical matters. During the 12th and 13th centuries, Trøndelag and Western Norway were the most important areas of the Norwegian kingdom and they shaped Old West Norse as an archaic language with a rich set of declensions. In the body of text that has survived into the modern day from until c. 1300, Old West Norse had little dialect variation, and Old Icelandic does not diverge much more than the Old Norwegian dialects do from each other. Old Norwegian differentiated early from Old Icelandic by the loss of the consonant h in initial position before l, n and r; thus whereas Old Icelandic manuscripts might use the form hnefi 'fist', Old Norwegian manuscripts might use nefi.

From the late 13th century, Old Icelandic and Old Norwegian started to diverge more. After c. 1350, the Black Death and following social upheavals seem to have accelerated language changes in Norway. From the late 14th century, the language used in Norway is generally referred to as Middle Norwegian.

Old West Norse underwent a lengthening of initial vowels at some point, especially in Norwegian, so that OWN eta became éta, ONW akr > ákr, OIC ek > ék.

==== Old Icelandic ====
In Iceland, initial /w/ before /ɾ/ was lost: (Note: Cleasby & Vigfússon 1874, p. 481 "R") compare Icelandic rangur with Danish vrang, OEN wrangʀ. The change is shared with Old Gutnish.

A specifically Icelandic sound, the long, u-umlauted A, spelled ⟨Ǫ́⟩ and pronounced /ɔː/, developed around the early 11th century. It was short-lived, being marked in the Grammatical Treatises and remaining until the end of the 12th century. It then merged back into /aː/; as a result, long A is not affected by u-umlaut in Modern Icelandic.

/w/ merged with /v/ during the 12th century, which caused /v/ to become an independent phoneme from /f/ and the written distinction of ⟨v⟩ for /v/ from medial and final ⟨f⟩ to become merely etymological.

Around the 13th century, Œ/Ǿ (/øː/, which had probably already lowered to /œː/) merged to Æ (/ɛː/). (Note: Cleasby & Vigfússon 1874, p. 757 "Æ") Thus, pre-13th-century grœnn (with ⟨œ⟩) 'green' became spelled as in modern Icelandic grænn (with ⟨æ⟩). The 12th-century Gray Goose Laws manuscripts distinguish the vowels, and so does the Codex Regius copy. However, the 13th-century Codex Regius copy of the Poetic Edda probably relied on newer or poorer quality sources, or both. Demonstrating either difficulty with or total lack of natural distinction, the manuscripts show separation of the two phonemes in some places, but they frequently confuse the letters chosen to distinguish them in others.

Towards the end of the 13th century, Ę (/ɛ/) merged to E (/e/). (Note: Cleasby & Vigfússon 1874, pp. 113–114 "E")

==== Old Norwegian ====
Around the 11th century, Old Norwegian ⟨hl⟩, ⟨hn⟩, and ⟨hr⟩ became ⟨l⟩, ⟨n⟩ and ⟨r⟩. It is debatable whether the ⟨hC⟩ sequences represented a consonant cluster (/hC/) or devoicing (/C̥/).

Orthographic evidence suggests that in a confined dialect of Old Norwegian, /ɔ/ may have been unrounded before /u/ and that u-umlaut was reversed unless the u had been eliminated: ǫll, ǫllum > ǫll, allum.

==== Greenlandic Norse ====
This dialect of Old West Norse was spoken by Icelandic colonies in Greenland. When the colonies died out around the 15th century, the dialect went extinct with it. The phoneme /θ/ and some instances of /ð/ merged to /t/ and so Old Icelandic Þórðr became Tortr.

==== Text example ====
The following text is from Alexanders saga, an Alexander Romance. The manuscript, AM 519 a 4to, is dated c. 1280. The facsimile demonstrates the sigla used by scribes to write Old Norse. Many of them were borrowed from Latin. Without familiarity with these abbreviations, the facsimile will be unreadable to many. In addition, reading the manuscript itself requires familiarity with the letterforms of the native script. The abbreviations are expanded in a version with normalized spelling like that of the standard normalization system. Compared to the spelling of the same text in Modern Icelandic, pronunciation has changed greatly, but spelling has changed little since Icelandic orthography was intentionally modelled after Old Norse in the 19th century.

Digital facsimile of the manuscript text	The same text with normalized spelling	The same text with Modern Icelandic spelling
[...] ſem oꝩın͛ h̅ſ brıgzloðo h̅o̅ epꞇ͛ þͥ ſe̅ ſıðaʀ mon ſagꞇ verða. Þeſſı ſveın̅ aͬ.* ꝩar ıſcola ſeꞇꞇr ſem ſıðꝩenıa e͛ ꞇıl rıkra man̅a vꞇan-lanꝺz aꞇ laꞇa g͛a vıð boꝛn̅ ſíıƞ́ Meıſꞇarı ꝩar h̅o̅ ꝼengın̅ ſa e͛ arıſꞇoꞇıleſ heꞇ. h̅ ꝩar harðla goðꝛ clercr ⁊ en̅ meſꞇı ſpekıngr aꞇ ꝩıꞇı. ⁊ er h̅ ꝩͬ.xíí. veꞇᷓ gamall aꞇ allꝺrı nalıga alroſcın̅ aꞇ ꝩıꞇı. en ſꞇoꝛhvgaðꝛ u̅ ꝼᷓm alla ſına ıaꝼnallꝺꝛa.	[...] sem óvinir hans brigzluðu honum eftir því, sem síðarr man sagt verða. þessi sveinn Alexander var í skóla settr, sem siðvenja er til ríkra manna útanlands at láta gera við bǫrn sín. meistari var honum fenginn sá, er Aristoteles hét. hann var harðla góðr klerkr ok inn mesti spekingr at viti. ok er hann var tólv vetra gamall at aldri, náliga alroskinn at viti, en stórhugaðr umfram alla sína jafnaldra, [...]	[...] sem óvinir hans brigsluðu honum eftir því, sem síðar mun sagt verða. Þessi sveinn Alexander var í skóla settur, sem siðvenja er til ríkra manna utanlands að láta gera við börn sín. Meistari var honum fenginn sá, er Aristóteles hét. Hann var harla góður klerkur og hinn mesti spekingur að viti og er hann var tólf vetra gamall að aldri, nálega alroskinn að viti, en stórhugaður umfram alla sína jafnaldra, [...]

* a printed in uncial. Uncials not encoded separately in Unicode as of this section's writing.

=== Old East Norse ===
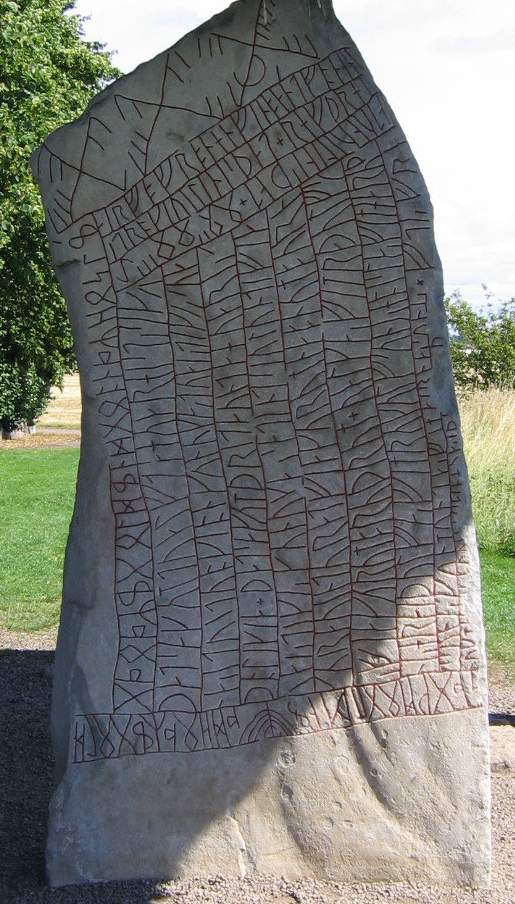
The Rök runestone in Östergötland, Sweden, is the longest surviving source of early Old East Norse. It is inscribed on both sides.

Old East Norse or Old East Nordic between 800 and 1100 is called Runic Swedish in Sweden and Runic Danish in Denmark, but for geographical rather than linguistic reasons. Any differences between the two were minute at best during the more ancient stages of this dialect group. Changes had a tendency to occur earlier in the Danish region. Even today many Old Danish changes have still not taken place in modern Swedish. Swedish is therefore the more conservative of the two in both the ancient and the modern languages, sometimes by a profound margin. The language is called "runic" because the body of text appears in runes.

Runic Old East Norse is characteristically conservative in form, especially Swedish (which is still true for modern Swedish compared to Danish). In essence it matches or surpasses the conservatism of post-runic Old West Norse, which in turn is generally more conservative than post-runic Old East Norse. While typically "Eastern" in structure, many later post-runic changes and trademarks of OEN had yet to happen.

The phoneme ʀ, which evolved during the Proto-Norse period from z, was still clearly separated from r in most positions, even when being geminated, while in OWN it had already merged with r.

The Proto-Germanic phoneme */w/ was preserved in initial sounds in Old East Norse (w-), unlike in West Norse where it developed into /v/. It survived in rural Swedish dialects in the provinces of Westro- and North Bothnia, Skåne, Blekinge, Småland, Halland, Västergötland and south of Bohuslän into the 18th, 19th and 20th century. It is still preserved in the Dalecarlian dialects in the province of Dalarna, Sweden, and in Jutlandic dialects in Denmark. The /w/-phoneme did also occur after consonants (kw-, tw-, sw- etc.) in Old East Norse and did so into modern times in said Swedish dialects and in a number of others. Generally, the initial w-sound developed into [v] in dialects earlier than after consonants where it survived much longer.

In summation, the /w/-sound survived in the East Nordic tongues almost a millennium longer than in the West Norse counterparts, and does still subsist at the present.

Monophthongization of æi > ē and øy, au > ø̄ started in mid-10th-century Denmark. Compare runic OEN: fæigʀ, gæiʀʀ, haugʀ, møydōmʀ, diūʀ ; with Post-runic OEN: fēgher, gēr, hø̄gher, mø̄dōmber, diūr ; OWN: feigr, geirr, haugr, meydómr, dýr ; from PN *faigijaz, *gaizaz, *haugaz, *mawi + -dōmaz 'maidendom/ virginity', *diuza.

Feminine o-stems often preserve the plural ending -aʀ, while in OWN they more often merge with the feminine i-stems: (runic OEN) *sōlaʀ, *hafnaʀ, *hamnaʀ, *wāgaʀ versus OWN sólir, hafnir and vágir (Danish has mainly lost the distinction between the two stems, with both endings now being rendered as -er or -e alternatively for the o-stems; modern Swedish solar, hamnar, vågar).

Vice versa, masculine i-stems with the root ending in either g or k tended to shift the plural ending to that of the ja-stems while OEN kept the original: drængiaʀ, *ælgiaʀ and *bænkiaʀ versus OWN drengir, elgir and bekkir (modern Danish drenge, elge, bænke ; modern Swedish drängar, älgar, bänkar).

The plural ending of ja-stems were mostly preserved while those of OWN often acquired that of the i-stems: *bæðiaʀ, *bækkiaʀ, *wæfiaʀ versus OWN beðir, bekkir, vefir (modern Swedish bäddar, bäckar, vävar).

==== Old Danish ====
Until the early 12th century, Old East Norse was very much a uniform dialect. It was in Denmark that the first innovations appeared that would differentiate Old Danish from Old Swedish (Bandle 2005, Old East Nordic, pp. 1856, 1859) as these innovations spread north unevenly (unlike the earlier changes that spread more evenly over the East Norse area), creating a series of isoglosses going from Zealand to Svealand.

In Old Danish, /hɾ/ merged with /ɾ/ during the 9th century. From the 11th to 14th centuries, the unstressed vowels -a, -o and -e (standard normalization -a, -u and -i) started to merge into a single central vowel, represented with the letter ⟨e⟩, which also came from widespread epenthesis, occurring particularly before -ʀ endings. At the same time, the voiceless stop consonants p, t and k became voiced plosives and even fricative consonants. Resulting from these innovations, Danish has kage (cake), tunger (tongues) and gæster (guests) whereas (Standard) Swedish has retained older forms, kaka, tungor and gäster (OEN kaka, tungur, gæstir).

Moreover, the Danish pitch accent shared with Norwegian and Swedish changed into stød around this time.

==== Old Swedish ====
At the end of the 10th and early 11th century initial h- before l, n and r was still preserved in the middle and northern parts of Sweden, and is sporadically still preserved in some northern dialects as g-, e.g. gly 'lukewarm', from hlýʀ. The Dalecarlian dialects developed independently from Old Swedish and as such can be considered separate languages from Swedish.

==== Text example ====
This is an extract from Västgötalagen, the Westrogothic law. It is the oldest text written as a manuscript found in Sweden and from the 13th century. It is contemporaneous with most of the Icelandic literature. The text marks the beginning of Old Swedish as a distinct dialect.

Dræpær maþar svænskan man eller smalenskæn, innan konongsrikis man, eigh væstgøskan, bøte firi atta ørtogher ok þrettan markær ok ænga ætar bot. [...] Dræpar maþær danskan man allæ noræn man, bøte niv markum. Dræpær maþær vtlænskan man, eigh ma frid flyia or landi sinu oc j æth hans. Dræpær maþær vtlænskæn prest, bøte sva mykit firi sum hærlænskan man. Præstær skal i bondalaghum væræ. Varþær suþærman dræpin ællær ænskær maþær, ta skal bøta firi marchum fiurum þem sakinæ søkir, ok tvar marchar konongi.

— Västgötalagen
Translation:

If someone slays a Swede or a Smålander, a man from the kingdom, but not a West Geat, he will pay eight örtugar and thirteen marks, but no weregild. [...] If someone slays a Dane or a Norwegian, he will pay nine marks. If someone slays a foreigner, he shall not be banished and have to flee to his clan. If someone slays a foreign priest, he will pay as much as for a fellow countryman. A priest counts as a freeman. If a Southerner is slain or an Englishman, he shall pay four marks to the plaintiff and two marks to the king.

=== Old Gutnish ===
Due to Gotland's early isolation from the mainland, many features of Old Norse did not spread from or to the island, and Old Gutnish developed as an entirely separate branch from Old East and West Norse. For example, the diphthong ai in aigu, þair and waita was not subject to anticipatory assimilation to ei as in e.g. Old Icelandic eigu, þeir and veita. Gutnish also shows dropping of /w/ in initial /wɾ/, which it shares with the Old West Norse dialects (except Old East Norwegian), but which is otherwise abnormal. Breaking was also particularly active in Old Gutnish, leading to e.g. biera versus mainland bera.

==== Text example ====
The Guta lag 'law of the Gutes' is the longest text surviving from Old Gutnish. Appended to it is a short texting dealing with the history of the Gotlanders. This part relates to the agreement that the Gotlanders had with the Swedish king sometime before the 9th century:

So gingu gutar sielfs wiliandi vndir suia kunung þy at þair mattin frir Oc frelsir sykia suiariki j huerium staþ. vtan tull oc allar utgiftir. So aigu oc suiar sykia gutland firir vtan cornband ellar annur forbuþ. hegnan oc hielp sculdi kunungur gutum at waita. En þair wiþr þorftin. oc kallaþin. sendimen al oc kunungr oc ierl samulaiþ a gutnal þing senda. Oc latta þar taka scatt sinn. þair sendibuþar aighu friþ lysa gutum alla steþi til sykia yfir haf sum upsala kunungi til hoyrir. Oc so þair sum þan wegin aigu hinget sykia.

— Gutasaga, § Inträdet i Sverige
Translation:

So, by their own will, the Gotlanders became the subjects of the Swedish king, so that they could travel freely and without risk to any location in the Swedish kingdom without toll and other fees. Likewise, the Swedes had the right to go to Gotland without corn restrictions or other prohibitions. The king was to provide protection and help, when they needed it and asked for it. The king and the jarl shall in return send emissaries to the Gutnish All-thing to receive the taxes. These emissaries shall declare free passage for the Gotlanders to all ports across the sea which belong to the king at Uppsala and likewise for everyone who want to travel to Gotland.

== Relationship to other languages ==
=== Relationship to English ===
Old English and Old Norse were related languages. It is therefore not surprising that many words in Old Norse look familiar to English speakers : e.g., armr 'arm', fótr 'foot', land 'land', fullr 'full', hanga 'to hang', standa 'to stand'. This is because both English and Old Norse stem from a Proto-Germanic mother language. In addition, numerous common, everyday Old Norse words were adopted into the Old English language during the Viking Age. A few examples of Old Norse loanwords in modern English are (English/Viking Age Old East Norse):

- Nouns – anger (angr), bag (baggi), bait (bæit, bæita, bæiti), band (band), bark (bǫrkʀ, stem bark-), birth (byrðr), dirt (drit), dregs (dræggiaʀ), egg (ægg, related to OE. cognate æg which became Middle English: eye/eai), fellow (félagi), gap (gap), husband (húsbóndi), cake (kaka), keel (kiǫlʀ, stem also kial-, kil-), kid (kið), knife (knífʀ), law (lǫg, stem lag-), leg (læggʀ), link (hlænkʀ), loan (lán, related to OE. cognate læn, cf. lend), race (rǫs, stem rás-), root (rót, related to OE. cognate wyrt, cf. wort), sale (sala), scrap (skrap), seat (sæti), sister (systir, related to OE. cognate sweostor), skill (skial/skil), skin (skinn), skirt (skyrta vs. the native English shirt of the same root), sky (ský), slaughter (slátr), snare (snara), steak (stæik), thrift (þrift), tidings (tíðindi), trust (traust), window (vindauga), wing (væ(i)ngʀ)
- Verbs – are (er, displacing OE sind), blend (blanda), call (kalla), cast (kasta), clip (klippa), crawl (krafla), cut (possibly from ON kuta), die (døyia), gasp (gæispa), get (geta), give (gifa/gefa, related to OE. cognate giefan), glitter (glitra), hit (hitta), lift (lyfta), raise (ræisa), ransack (rannsaka), rid (ryðia), run (rinna, stem rinn-/rann-/runn-, related to OE. cognate rinnan), scare (skirra), scrape (skrapa), seem (søma), sprint (sprinta), take (taka), thrive (þrífa(s)), thrust (þrysta), want (vanta)
- Adjectives – flat (flatr), happy (happ), ill (illr), likely (líklígʀ), loose (lauss), low (lágʀ), meek (miúkʀ), odd (odda), rotten (rotinn/rutinn), scant (skamt), sly (sløgʀ), weak (væikʀ), wrong (vrangʀ)
- Adverbs – thwart/athwart (þvert)
- Prepositions – till (til), fro (frá)
- Conjunction – though/tho (þó)
- Interjection – hail (hæill), wassail (ves hæill)
- Personal pronoun – they (þæiʀ), their (þæiʀa), them (þæim) (for which the Anglo-Saxons said híe, hiera, him)
- Prenominal adjectives – same (sam)

In a simple sentence like 'They are both weak', the extent of the Old Norse loanwords becomes quite clear; compare Old East Norse with archaic pronunciation: "Þæiʀ eʀu báðiʀ wæikiʀ" with Old English: "híe syndon bégen (þá) wáce". The words "they" and "weak" are both borrowed from Old Norse, and the word "both" might also be a borrowing, though this is disputed (cf. German beide). While the number of loanwords adopted from the Norse was not as numerous as that of Norman French or Latin, their depth and everyday nature make them a substantial and very important part of everyday English speech as they are part of the very core of the modern English vocabulary.

Tracing the origins of words like "bull" and "Thursday" is more difficult. "Bull" may derive from either Old English: bula or Old Norse: buli, while "Thursday" may be a borrowing or simply derive from the Old English: Þunresdæg, which could have been influenced by the Old Norse cognate. The word "are" is from Old English: earun/aron, which stems back to Proto-Germanic as well as the Old Norse cognates.

=== Relationship to modern Scandinavian languages ===
Development of Old Norse vowels to the modern Scandinavian languages
Old Norse	Modern Icelandic	Modern Faroese	Modern Swedish	Modern Danish	Examples (Note: Bokmål Norwegian – Norwegianization of written Danish ; Nynorsk Norwegian – Standardised written Norwegian based on Norwegian dialects; No = same in both forms of Norwegian.)
a ⟨a⟩	a(ː) (Note: Vowel length in the modern Scandinavian languages does not stem from Old Norse vowel length. In all of the modern languages, Old Norse vowel length was lost, and vowel length became allophonically determined by syllable structure, with long vowels occurring when followed by zero or one consonants (and some clusters, e.g. in Icelandic, most clusters of obstruent to obstruent + [r], [j] or [v], such as [pr], [tj], [kv] etc.) ; short vowels occurred when followed by most consonant clusters, including double consonants. Often, pairs of short and long vowels became differentiated in quality before the loss of vowel length and thus did not end up merging; e.g. Old Norse /a aː i iː/ became Icelandic /a au ɪ i/, all of which can occur allophonically short or long. In the mainland Scandinavian languages, double consonants were reduced to single consonants, making the new vowel length phonemic.)	a/ɛaː ; ɛ ⟨a⟩ (+ng, nk)	a/ɑː ⟨a⟩ ; ɔ/oː ⟨å⟩ (+ld, rd, ng)	⟨a⟩ ; ɔ/ɔː ⟨å⟩ (+rd)	ON land 'land': Ic/Fa/Sw/Da/No land ; ON dagr 'day': Ic/Fa dagur, Sw/Da/No dag; ON harðr 'hard': Ic/Fa harður, Sw/Da hård, No hard ; ON langr 'long': Ic/Fa langur, Sw lång, Da/No lang
ja ⟨ja⟩	ja(ː)	ja/jɛaː	(j)ɛ(ː) ⟨(j)ä⟩	jɛ: ⟨jæ⟩ ; jæ: ⟨je⟩ (+r)	ON hjalpa 'to help': Ic/Fa hjálpa, Sw hjälpa, Da hjælpe, No hjelpe, NN hjelpa ; ON hjarta 'heart': Ic/Fa hjarta, Sw hjärta, Da/NB hjerte, NN hjarta/hjarte
aː ⟨á⟩	au(ː)	ɔ/ɔaː	ɔ/oː ⟨å⟩	ɔ/ɒ: ⟨å⟩	ON láta 'to let': Ic/Fa láta, Sw låta, Da lade, No la
ɛː ⟨æ⟩	ai(ː)	a/ɛaː	ɛ(ː) ⟨ä⟩		ON mæla 'to speak': Ic/Fa/NN mæla, Sw mäla, No mæle ; ON sæll 'happy': Ic sæll, Fa sælur, Sw säll, Da/No sæl
e ⟨e⟩	ɛ(ː)	ɛ/eː	ɛ(ː) ⟨ä⟩		ON menn 'men': Ic/Fa menn, Sw män, Da mænd, No menn ; ON bera 'to bear': Ic/Fa bera, Sw bära, Da/NB bære, NN bera/bere ; ON vegr 'way': Ic/Fa vegur, Sw väg, Da vej, No vej/ veg
eː ⟨é⟩	jɛ(ː)	a/ɛaː ⟨æ⟩	ɛ(ː) ⟨ä⟩		ON kné 'knee': Ic hné, Fa/Da knæ, Sw knä, No kne
i ⟨i⟩	ɪ(ː)	ɪ/iː	ɪ/iː ⟨i⟩	e ⟨i⟩/ eː ⟨e⟩	ON kinn "cheek": Ic/Fa/No kinn, Sw/Da kind
iː ⟨í⟩	i(ː)	ʊɪ(ː) ʊt͡ʃː ⟨íggj⟩ (Note: When not followed by a consonant.)	ɪ/iː ⟨i⟩	⟨i⟩	ON tíð 'time': Ic/Fa tíð, Sw/Da/No tid
ɔ ⟨ǫ⟩	ø > œ(ː) ⟨ö⟩	œ/øː ⟨ø⟩ ɔ/oː ⟨o⟩ (Note: When followed by a nasal consonant.)	⟨a⟩ ; ⟨o⟩ ; (Note: ⟨o⟩ or (before /r/) ⟨ø⟩ in some isolated words, but the tendency was to restore ⟨a⟩.) ⟨ø⟩ (+r) ; ⟨å⟩ (+ld, rd, ng)		ON hǫnd' 'hand': Ic hönd, Fa hond, Sw/NN hand, Da/NB hånd ; ON nǫs 'nose': Ic nös, Fa nøs, Sw/NN nos, Da næse, NB nese, NN nase ; ON ǫrn 'eagle': Ic/Sw örn, Fa/Da/No ørn ; ON sǫngr 'song': Ic söngur, Fa songur, Sw sång, Da/NB sang, NN song
jɔ ⟨jǫ⟩	jø > jœ(ː) ⟨jö⟩	jœ/jøː ⟨jø⟩	(j)œ/(j)øː ⟨(j)ö⟩		ON skjǫldr 'shield': Ic skjöldur', Fa skjøldur, Sw sköld, Da/No skjold ; ON bjǫrn 'bear': Ic/Sw björn, Fa/Da/NN bjørn
ɔː ⟨ǫ́⟩	aː > au(ː) ⟨á⟩	ɔ/ɔaː ⟨á⟩ œ/ɔuː ⟨ó⟩	ɔ/oː ⟨å⟩	⟨å⟩	ON tá (*tǫ́) 'toe': Ic/Fa tá, Sw/Da/No tå
o ⟨o⟩	ɔ(ː)	ɔ/oː	ɔ/oː ⟨o⟩		ON morginn/morgunn 'morning': Ic morgunn, Fa morgun, Sw/NN morgon, Da/NB morgen
oː ⟨ó⟩	ou(ː)	œ/ɔuː ɛkv ⟨ógv⟩	ʊ/uː ⟨o⟩	⟨o⟩	ON bók 'book': Ic/Fa bók, Sw/No bok, Da bog
u ⟨u⟩	ʏ(ː)	ʊ/uː	ɵ/ʉː ⟨u⟩		ON fullr 'full': Ic/Fa fullur, Sw/Da/No full
uː ⟨ú⟩	u(ː)	ʏ/ʉuː ɪkv ⟨úgv⟩	ɵ/ʉː ⟨u⟩	⟨u⟩	ON hús 'house': Ic/Fa hús, Sw/Da/No hus
joː ⟨jó⟩	jou(ː)	jœ/jɔuː (j)ɛkv ⟨(j)ógv⟩	jɵ/jʉː ⟨ju⟩	⟨y⟩	ON bjóða 'to offer, command': Ic/Fa bjóða, Sw bjuda, Da/No byde, NN byda, No by
juː ⟨jú⟩	ju(ː)	jʏ/jʉuː (j)ɪkv ⟨(j)úgv⟩	jɵ/jʉː ⟨ju⟩	⟨y⟩	ON djúpr 'deep': Ic/Fa djúpur, Sw/No djup, Da dyb, NB dyp
ø ⟨ø⟩	ø > œ(ː) ⟨ö⟩	œ/øː ⟨ø⟩	œ/øː ⟨ö⟩		ON gøra 'to prepare': Sw göra
øː ⟨œ⟩	ɛː > ai(ː) ⟨æ⟩	œ/øː ⟨ø⟩	œ/øː ⟨ö⟩	⟨ø⟩	ON grœnn 'green': Ic grænn, Fa grønur, Sw grön, Da/NN grøn, No grønn
y ⟨y⟩	ɪ(ː)	ɪ/iː	⟨ö⟩, ⟨y⟩ (Note: When un-umlauted */u/ is still present elsewhere in the paradigm.)		ON dyrr 'door': Ic/Fa dyr, Sw dörr, Da/No dør ON fylla 'to fill': Ic/Fa/NN/Sw fylla, Da fylde, No fylle
yː ⟨ý⟩	i(ː)	ʊɪ(ː) ʊt͡ʃː ⟨ýggj⟩	ʏ/yː ⟨y⟩	⟨y⟩	ON dýrr 'dear': Ic dýr, Fa dýrur, Sw/Da/No dyr
ɛi ⟨ei⟩	ei(ː)	aɪ(ː) at͡ʃː ⟨eiggj⟩	e(ː) ⟨e⟩	⟨e⟩	ON steinn 'stone': Ic steinn, Fa steinur, Sw/Da/NB sten, No stein
œy ⟨ey⟩	ei(ː)	ɔɪ(ː) ⟨oy⟩ ɔt͡ʃː ⟨oyggj⟩	œ/øː ⟨ö⟩	⟨ø⟩	ON ey 'island': Ic ey, Fa oyggj, Sw ö, Da ø, No øy
ɔu ⟨au⟩	øy(ː)	ɛ/ɛɪː ⟨ey⟩ ɛt͡ʃː ⟨eyggj⟩	œ/øː ⟨ö⟩	⟨ø⟩	ON draumr 'dream': Ic draumur, Fa dreymur, Sw dröm, Da/NB drøm, NN draum

Pronunciation of vowels in various Scandinavian languages
Spelling	Old Norse	Modern Icelandic	Modern Faroese	Modern Swedish	Modern Norwegian
⟨a⟩	a	a(ː)	a/ɛaː	a/ɑː	ɑ(ː)
⟨á⟩	aː	au(ː)	ɔ/ɔaː	–	
⟨ä⟩	–			ɛ/ɛː	–
⟨å⟩	–			ɔ/oː	
⟨æ⟩	ɛː	ai(ː)	a/ɛaː	–	æ(ː) , ɛ/eː
⟨e⟩	e	ɛ(ː)	ɛ/eː	e/eː	ɛ/eː , ə, æ(ː)
⟨é⟩	eː	jɛ(ː)	–		
⟨i⟩	i	ɪ(ː)	ɪ/iː		
⟨í⟩	iː	i(ː)	ʊɪ(ː)	–	
⟨o⟩	o	ɔ(ː)	ɔ/oː	ʊ/uː , ɔ/oː	uː , ɔ/oː
⟨ó⟩	oː	ou(ː)	œ/ɔuː	–	
⟨ǫ⟩	ɔ	–			
⟨ǫ́⟩	ɔː	–			
⟨ö⟩	–	ø > œ(ː)	–	œ/øː	–
⟨ø⟩	ø	–	œ/øː	–	œ/øː
⟨œ⟩	øː	–			
⟨u⟩	u	ʏ(ː)	ʊ/uː	ɵ/ʉː	ʉ(ː)
⟨ú⟩	uː	u(ː)	ʏ/ʉuː	–	
⟨y⟩	y	ɪ(ː)	ɪ/iː	ʏ/yː	
⟨ý⟩	yː	i(ː)	ʊɪ(ː)	–	
⟨ei⟩	ɛi	ei(ː)	aɪ(ː)	–	æɪ
⟨ey⟩	œy	ei(ː)	ɛ/ɛɪː	–	
⟨oy⟩	–		ɔɪ(ː)	–	
⟨øy⟩	–				œʏ
⟨au⟩	ɔu	øy(ː)	–		æʉ

== See also ==
- Germanic a-mutation
- An Introduction to Old Norse – A common textbook on the language
- List of English words of Old Norse origin
- List of Old Norse exonyms – Names that speakers of Old Norse assigned to foreign places and peoples
- Old Norse morphology – The grammar of the language.
- Old Norse orthography – The spelling of the language
- Old Norse poetry
- Proto-Norse language – The Scandinavian dialect of Proto-Germanic that developed into Old Norse

=== Dialectal information ===
- Greenlandic Norse
- History of Danish
- History of Icelandic
- Old Gutnish
- Old Norwegian
- Old Swedish

== Sources ==
=== Miscellaneous ===
- Árnason, Kristján (2011). The Phonology of Icelandic and Faroese. OUP. ISBN 978-0-19-922931-4.
- Benediktsson, Hr. (1963). "Some Aspects of Nordic Umlaut and Breaking". Language. 39 (3): 409–431. doi:10.2307/411124. JSTOR 411124.
- Borkent, Aukje (2014). Norse loanwords in Old and Middle Irish (Master thesis). UU. hdl:20.500.12932/17630.
- Farren, Robert (2014). Old Norse loanwords in modern Irish (Bachelor thesis). Lund University. Archived from the original on 16 August 2017.
- Friðriksdóttir, Sandra D. (2014). Old Norse Influence in Modern English: The Effect of the Viking Invasion (Bachelor thesis). University of Iceland. hdl:1946/17234.
- Greene, D. (1973). "The influence of Scandinavian on Irish". In Almqvist, B.; Greene, David (eds.). Proceedings of the Seventh Viking Congress (PDF). Dundalk: Dundalgan Press. Archived (PDF) from the original on 2 December 2025.
- Helfenstein, James (1870). A Comparative Grammar of the Teutonic Languages: Being at the Same Time a Historical Grammar of the English Language. London: MacMillan.
- Hellquist, E., ed. (1922). Svensk etymologisk ordbok [Swedish etymological dictionary] (in Swedish). C. W. K. Gleerups. Archived from the original on 8 March 2012.
- Henderson, G. (1910). "V: Norse linguistic influence". The Norse influence on Celtic Scotland. Glasgow: J. Maclehose and Sons. pp. 108–218.
- Hock, H. (1986). Principles of Historical Linguistics. TiLSM. Vol. 34. doi:10.1515/9783110871975. ISBN 978-3-11-010600-8.
- Hægstad, M. (1916). II: Sudvestlandsk. Vestnorske maalføre fyre 1350 (in Norwegian). Kristiania: Videnskabsselskapets skrifter II, Hist.-filos. Klasse.
- Kristoffersen, Gj. (2004). "The Development of Tonal Dialects in Scandinavian Languages" (PDF). Semantic Scholar. S2CID 133884145. Archived (PDF) from the original on 10 December 2025.
- ——— (2021). "Tonal Variation and Change in Dalarna Swedish". Journal of Germanic Linguistics. 33 (2). CUP: 179–233. doi:10.1017/S147054272000015X. hdl:11250/2766114.
- Kroonen, G. (19 October 2011). "On the origins of the Elfdalian nasal vowels from the perspective of diachronic dialectology and Germanic etymology" (PDF). curis.ku.dk (Presentation). Lund: KU. Archived (PDF) from the original on 6 February 2016.
- Noreen, A. (1884). Abriss Der Altnordischen (Altisländischen) Grammatik (in German).
- Riad, Tomas (1998). "The origin of Scandinavian tone accents". Diachronia. 15: 63–98. doi:10.1075/DIA.15.1.04RIA. S2CID 170285417.
- ——— (2023). "The explananda in North Germanic Tonogenesis". Anuario del Seminario de Filología Vasca "Julio de Urquijo". 57 (1–2): 841–857. doi:10.1387/asju.25974. hdl:10810/78158.
- Robinson, O. W. (1992). Old English and Its Closest Relatives. SUP. doi:10.4324/9780203393086. ISBN 0-8047-2221-8.
- Schalin, Johan (2018). "Preliterary Scandinavian Sound Change Viewed From the East". Nordica Helsingiensia. 54: 146–147. hdl:10138/238886.
- Selmer, E. W. (1924). De færøiske tonelag: ⟨med 46 tekstfigurer⟩. Opuscula phonetica Instituti Universitatis Regiae Fredericianae (in Norwegian). Vol. IV. Kristiania: A.W. Brøggers boktrykkeri.
- Stewart, Thomas W. (Jr.) (2004). "Lexical imposition: Old Norse vocabulary in Scottish Gaelic". Diachronica. 21 (2): 393–420. doi:10.1075/dia.21.2.06ste.
- Sturtevant, Albert M. (1953). "Further Old Norse Secondary Formations". Language. 29 (4): 457–462. doi:10.2307/409955. JSTOR 409955.
- Wills, Tarrin (2006). "The Anonymous Verse in the Third Grammatical Treatise". The Fantastic in Old Norse / Icelandic literature: Sagas and the British isles. Saga Conference Proceedings. Vol. 2. The Centre for Medieval and Renaissance Studies, Durham University. pp. 1054–1063. ISBN 978-0-9553335-0-7. Archived from the original on 4 September 2018.
- Þráinsson, Höskuldur; Árnason, Kristján (2017). "Íslenskar mállýskur" [Icelandic dialects]. Málsgreinar (in Icelandic). Árnastofnun. Archived from the original on 31 October 2018.

=== General sources ===
- Adams, Ch. K., ed. (1899) [1876]. "Raleigh-Tananarivo". Johnson's Universal Cyclopaedia: A New Edition. Vol. 7. D. Appleton, A. J. Johnson.
- Bandle, Oskar; Braunmüller, Kurt; Jahr, E. H.; Karker, Allan; Naumann, Hans-Peter; Teleman, Ulf; Elmevik, Lennart; Widmark, Gun, eds. (2002–2005). The Nordic Languages: An International Handbook on the History of the North Germanic Languages. HSK. Vol. 22. Berlin: Walter de Gruyter.
  - Vol. 1. 2002. doi:10.1515/9783110197051. ISBN 978-3-11-014876-3.
    - Hagland, J. R. (2002). Dialects and written language in Old Nordic I: Old Norwegian and Old Icelandic. pp. 1015–1017.
  - Bandle, Oskar; Braunmüller, Kurt; Jahr, Ernst Hakon; Karker, Allan; Naumann, Hans-Peter; Teleman, Ulf; Elmevik, Lennart; Widmark, Gun, eds. (2005). Vol. 2. doi:10.1515/9783110197068. ISBN 978-3-11-017149-5.
    - Schulte, M. (2005). XIII §122. Phonological developments from Old Nordic to Early Modern Nordic I: West Scandinavian. pp. 1081–1097.
    - Sandøy, H. (2005). XVII §202. The typological development of the Nordic languages I: Phonology. pp. 1852–1872.
- Harbert, Wayne (2007). The Germanic Languages. Cambridge Language Surveys. doi:10.1017/CBO9780511755071. ISBN 978-0-521-01511-0.
- Haugan, Jens (1998). "Right Dislocated 'Subjects' in Old Norse". Working Papers in Scandinavian Syntax (62): 37–60.
- Haugen, E. (1950). "First Grammatical Treatise: The Earliest Germanic Phonology". Language. 26 (4): 4–64. doi:10.2307/522272. JSTOR 522272.
- Haugen, O. E., ed. (2008) [2004]. The Menota handbook: Guidelines for the electronic encoding of Medieval Nordic primary sources (Version 2.0 ed.). Bergen: Medieval Nordic Text Archive. ISBN 978-82-8088-400-8. Archived from the original on 24 May 2020. , "The Menota handbook 2.0"
- König, E.; van der Auwera, Johan, eds. (2002) [1995]. The Germanic Languages. Routledge Language Family. doi:10.4324/9781315812786. ISBN 978-0415280792.
  - Faarlund, J. T. (1995). Old and Middle Scandinavian. pp. 38–71. ISBN 978-1-315-81278-6.
  - Barnes, Michael P.; Weyhe, Eivind (1995). Faroese. pp. 190–218. ISBN 978-1-315-81278-6.
- Lass, R. (1993). Old English: A Historical Linguistic Companion. CUP. ISBN 0-521-43087-9.
- Moberg, J.; Gooskens, C.; Nerbonne, J.; Vaillette, N. (2007). "4: Conditional Entropy Measures Intelligibility among Related Languages". Proceedings of the 17th Meeting of Computational Linguistics in the Netherlands. LOT Occasional. Vol. 7. pp. 51–66. hdl:1874/296747.
- O'Donoghue, H. (2004). Old Norse-Icelandic Literature: A Short Introduction. Blackwell Introductions to Literature. doi:10.1002/9780470776063. ISBN 978-0-631-23625-2.
- Torp, A.; Vikør, L. S. (2014) [1993]. Hovuddrag i norsk språkhistorie [The main features of Norwegian language history] (in Norwegian) (4th ed.). Gyldendal ak. ISBN 978-82-05-46402-5.

=== Grammars ===
- Barnes, Michael (2008) [1999]. A New Introduction to Old Norse (PDF). Vol. I (Grammar) (3rd ed.). Viking Society for Northern Research, UCL. ISBN 978-0-903521-74-1.
- Bayldon, George (1870). An Elementary Grammar of the Old Norse or Icelandic Language. London: Williams and Norgate.
- Brøndum-Nielsen, Johannes (1928–1974). Gammeldansk Grammatik i sproghistorisk Fremstilling. Vol. 1–8. København: J. H. Schultz. (Old Danish)
- Faarlund, J. T. (2004). The Syntax of Old Norse: With a survey of the inflectional morphology and a complete bibliography. New York: OUP. doi:10.1093/acprof:oso/9780199235599.001.0001. ISBN 0-19-927110-0. (Old Norse in the narrow sense, i.e. Old West Norse)
- Haugen, O. E., ed. (2006) [1993]. Grunnbok i norrønt språk [Old Norse handbook] (in Norwegian) (revised 3rd printing of the 4th ed.). Gyldendal ak. ISBN 82-05-28109-2. (Old West Norse)
- ——— (2020) [2013]. Schwabe, Fabian (ed.). Norröne Grammatik im Überblick [Old Norse Grammar in Overview] (in German). Translated by van Nahl, Astrid (2nd ed.). Universität Bergen. Archived from the original on 24 October 2021. (Old West Norse)
- Iversen, R. (1973) [1923]. Norrøn grammatikk (in Norwegian) (7th ed.). Oslo: Aschehoug. (Old West Norse)
- Noreen, A. (2010) [1884]. van Weenen, Andrea de Leeuw (ed.). Altnordische grammatik I. Altisländische und altnorwegische grammatik (laut- und flexionslehre) (in German) (digitalised 4th ed.). Halle (Saale): Max Niemeyer. Archived from the original on 24 October 2021. (Old West Norse)
- ——— (1904). Altnordische grammatik II. Altschwedische grammatik mit einschluss des altgutnischen. Halle: Max Niemeyer. (Old Swedish and Old Gutnish)
- Vigfússon, Gu.; Powell, F. Y. (1879). An Icelandic Prose Reader: with Notes, Grammar, and Glossary. Oxford Clarendon Press.

=== Dictionaries ===
- Cleasby, R.; Vigfússon, Gu. (1874). An Icelandic-English Dictionary. Oxford Clarendon Press.
  e-text Archived 20 July 2021 at the Wayback Machine via the Germanic Lexicon Project (germanic-lexicon-project.org
  e-text Archived 17 April 2023 at the Wayback Machine adapted from the Germanic Lexicon Project version to work better with mobile devices and with an improved search (old-norse.net)
- Egilsson, Sv., ed. (1854). Lexicon poeticum antiquæ linguæ septentrionalis (in Danish and Latin). Hafniæ: typis J. D. Qvist.
- Egilsson, Sv.; Jónsson, F., eds. (1931) [1913–1916]. Lexicon poeticum antiquæ linguæ septentrionalis (2nd ed.).
  First and Second editions Archived 19 April 2021 at the Wayback Machine via www.septentrionalia.net
- Sigurðardóttir, A.; et al. (eds.). "ONP: Dictionary of Old Norse Prose". onp.ku.dk (in Danish and English). KU. Archived from the original on 18 December 2019.
- de Vries, J. (1977) [1957-60]. Altnordisches Etymologisches Wörterbuch [Old Norse Etymological Dictionary] (PDF) (in German) (2nd corrected ed.). Leiden: E. J. Brill.
- Zoëga, G. T. (1896). Ensk-Íslenzk orðabók. Reykjavík: Kostnaarmaur, Sigurdur Kristjánsson.
- (1922). Íslenzk-Ensk orabók. Reykjavík: Kostnaarmaur, Sigurdur Kristjánsson.
- ——— (1910). A Concise Dictionary of Old Icelandic.
  scanned document Archived 11 February 2021 at the Wayback Machine via "Germanic Lexicon Project" (lexicon.ff.cuni.cz)
  e-text Archived 1 January 2022 at the Wayback Machine via norroen.info

=== Old Norse texts ===
  - Aronsson, L., ed. (1997). Gutasagan (in Old Norse). Archived from the original on 12 November 2020.
  - Tunstall, Peter (ed.). Gutarnas Krönika eller Gutasagan [The History of the Gotlanders] (in Old Norse and English). Archived from the original on 10 November 2011. , facing translation
- van Weenen, Andrea de Leeuw. "Alexanders saga: A digital edition" (6 March 2007). Medieval Nordic Text Archive, ID: AM 519 a 4to. Menota, CLARINO. Retrieved 4 September 2018.

=== Language learning resources ===
- Barnes, Michael; Faulkes, Anthony (1999). A New Introduction to Old Norse. Viking Society for Northern Research, UCL. Available at the Viking Society for Northern Research homepage.
  - Barnes (2008). Grammar (PDF). Vol. I (3rd ed.). Viking Society for Northern Research. ISBN 978-0-903521-74-1.
  - Faulkes, ed. (2011). Reader (PDF). Vol. II (5th ed.). Viking Society for Northern Research. ISBN 978-0-903521-83-3.
  - Barnes; Faulkes (2011). Glossary (PDF). Vol. III (reprint of 4th corrected ed.). Viking Society for Northern Research. ISBN 978-0-903521-70-3.
- Byock, J. (2013). Learn Old Norse, Runes, and Icelandic Sagas. Viking Language. Vol. 1. Jules William Press. ISBN 978-1-4802-1644-0.
- Gordon, E. V. (1984) [1927]. Taylor, A. R. (ed.). An Introduction to Old Norse (reprint of 2nd corrected ed.). Oxford Clarendon Press. ISBN 978-0-19-811184-9.
- Sweet, H. (1895). An Icelandic Primer: with Grammar, Notes, and Glossary (2nd ed.). Oxford Clarendon Press.
  alt source Archived 24 February 2021 at the Wayback Machine via Germanic Lexicon Project (lexicon.ff.cuni.cz)
  e-ext Archived 26 October 2021 at the Wayback Machine via Project Gutenberg
- Valfells, Sigrid; Caithey, James E. (1981). Old Icelandic: An Introductory Course. OUP. ISBN 0-19-811172-X.
- Þorgeirsson, Haukur; Guðlaugsson, Óskar. Old Norse for Beginners. Archived from the original on 23 January 2017.
