= Faroese Scientific Society =

- Føroya Fróðskaparfelag
- Formation: 17 December 1952
- Founded at: Tórshavn
- Legal status: Foundation
- Purpose: To promote scientific co-operation and research in the Faroe Islands.
- Location: Postrúm 209, FO-110, Tórshavn
- Region served: Faroe Islands
- Official language: Faroese
- Website: frodskaparfelag.fo

The Faroese Scientific Society (Faroese: Føroya Fróðskaparfelag), was founded in 1952 with the objective of promoting co-operation in all fields of learning, collecting scientific literature, and publishing the results of research on or carried out in the Faroe Islands. A yearly periodical, Fróðskaparrit, came to be published annually. It was through the work of the society that the University of the Faroe Islands (Faroese: Fróðskaparsetur Føroya) came to be founded.

== See also ==
- Education in the Faroe Islands
- University of the Faroe Islands
