= Thorlac Turville-Petre =

English philologist

- Born: 6 January 1944 (age 82)
- Children: 2

Academic background
- Education: Jesus College, Oxford

Academic work
- Discipline: Philology
- Sub-discipline: Middle English literature; Alliterative Morte Arthure; Piers Plowman
- Institutions: University of Nottingham
- Main interests: Middle English literature

Thorlac Francis Samuel Turville-Petre (born 6 January 1944) is an English philologist who is Professor Emeritus and former head of the School of English at the University of Nottingham. He specializes in the study of Middle English literature.

== Biography ==
Thorlac Turville-Petre was born on 6 January 1944, the son of Gabriel and Joan Turville-Petre (née Blomfield), both of whom were prominent scholars of Old Norse studies at the University of Oxford. He attended Magdalen College School, Oxford, and gained his B.A., B.Litt. and M.A. from Jesus College, Oxford. He joined the faculty at the University of Nottingham as a lecturer in 1971, where he subsequently became Professor of Medieval English Literature. Turville-Petre has conducted important research on alliterative poetry and the Wollaton Manuscripts and other significant pieces of historical literature.[1] He is editorial secretary of The Society for Early English and Norse Electronic Texts: https://www.seenet.org/. Turville-Petre retired from the University of Nottingham as Professor Emeritus on 31 August 2010. He is the author of many books, award-winning scholarly papers, major monographs, and a recipient of large grants from Research Councils. Medieval Alliterative Poetry (2010), a festschrift in honour of Turville-Petre, was published under the editorship of John A. Burrow and Hoyt N. Duggan.[1] He is married with two sons and two granddaughters.

== Select Publications ==
Turville-Petre is author of the following books:

• The Alliterative Revival Cambridge (1977)

• (With M. Gelling) Studies in Honour of Kenneth Cameron Leeds (1987)

• (With H. N. Duggan) The Wars of Alexander Early English Text Society Oxford (1989)

• Alliterative Poetry in the Later Middle Ages London (1989)

• (With J. A. Burrow) A Book of Middle English Oxford (1992; 4th edition 2021)

• (With Brian Tate) Two Pilgrim Itineraries of the Later Middle Ages Santiago (1995)

• England the Nation: Language, Literature, and National Identity, 1290-1340 Oxford (1996)

• Image and Text: Medieval Manuscripts at the University of Nottingham Nottingham (1997)

• (With A. J. Minnis and Charlotte C. Morse) Essays on Ricardian Literature in Honour of J. A. Burrow Oxford (1997)

• Reading Middle English Literature Oxford (2007)

• (with Ralph Hanna) The Wollaton Medieval Manuscripts: Texts, Owners and Readers Woodbridge (2010)

• Poems from BL MS Harley 913:‘The Kildare Manuscript’, Early English Text Society Oxford (2015)

• (with J. A. Burrow) Piers Plowman: the B-Version Archetype (Bx) Raleigh, NC (2018)

• Description and Narrative in Middle English Alliterative Poetry Liverpool (2018)

• Pearl Liverpool (2021)

• St Erkenwald: A Critical Edition Liverpool (2024)

Electronic Editions (online at https://piers.chass.ncsu.edu/)

• (with Robert Adams, Hoyt N. Duggan et al.) The Piers Plowman Electronic Archive, vol. 1: Corpus Christi College, Oxford MS 201 (F) (2000)

• (with H. N. Duggan) An Electronic Edition of the B-Text of Piers Plowman in Trinity College, Cambridge, MS B.15.17, The Piers Plowman Electronic Archive, vol 2 (2000)

• (with E. Eliason and H. N. Duggan) The Piers Plowman Electronic Archive, vol. 5: British Library Add. MS 35287 (M) (2005)

• (with M. Calabrese and H. N. Duggan) The Piers Plowman Electronic Archive, vol. 6: San Marino, Huntington Library Hm 128 (Hm, Hm2) (2008)

• (with J. A. Burrow) The Piers Plowman Electronic Archive, vol 9: The B-Version Archetype (2014)
