= Heather O'Donoghue =

British academic

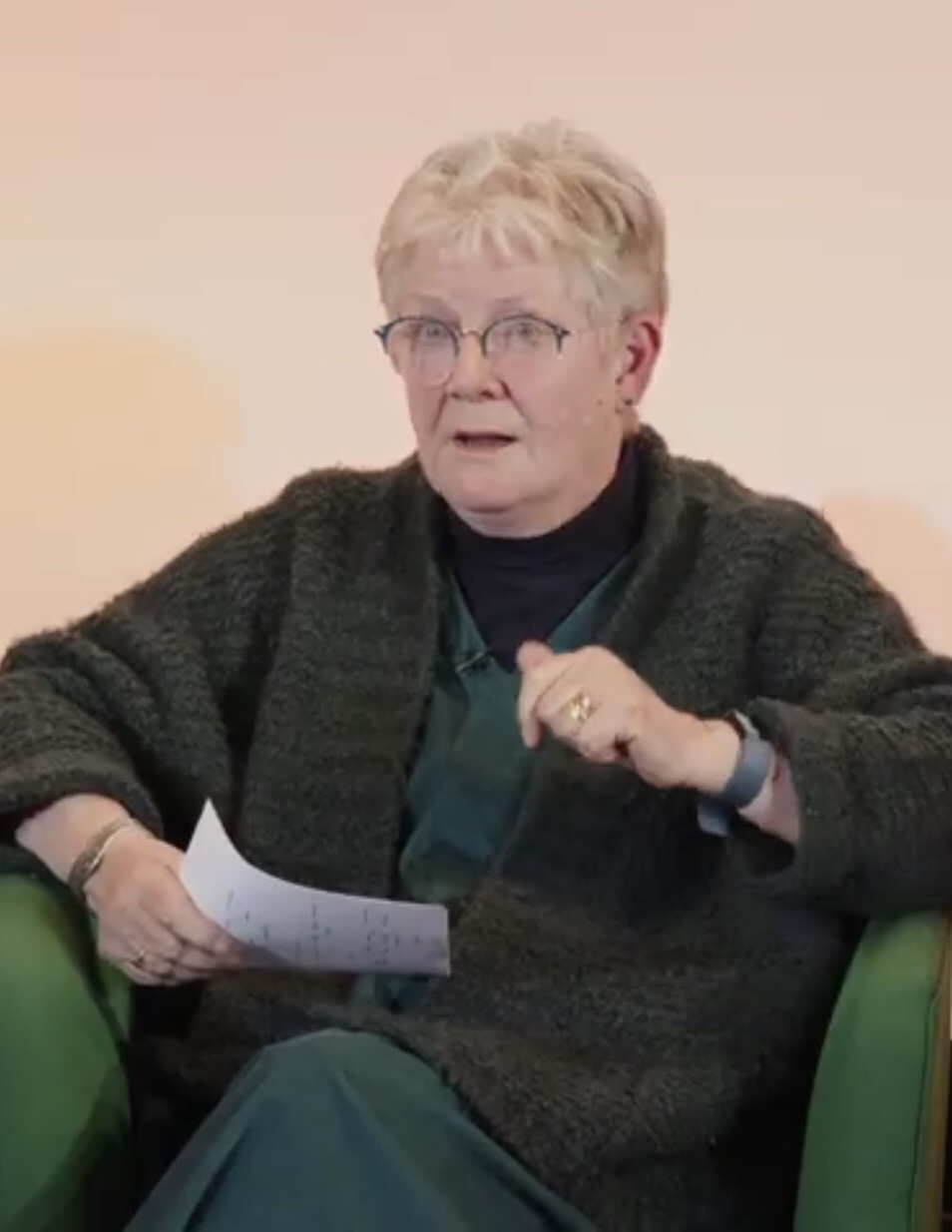
- O'Donoghue at the British Library in 2024

Heather O'Donoghue is a British academic. She is Emeritus Professor of Old Norse and Vigfusson Rausing Reader in Ancient Icelandic Literature and Antiquities at the University of Oxford. She is a Fellow of Linacre College, Oxford.

== Selected publications ==
O'Donoghue's books include:

- The genesis of a saga narrative : verse and prose in Kormaks saga. Oxford: Clarendon Press. 1991. ISBN 0198117833. OCLC 22307211.
- Skaldic verse and the poetics of saga narrative. Oxford: Oxford University Press. 2005. ISBN 0199267324. OCLC 58998791.
- Old Norse-Icelandic Literature : a Short Introduction. Blackwell Publishing. 2004. ISBN 9780470776834. OCLC 437218589.
- From Asgard to Valhalla : the remarkable history of the Norse myths. London: I.B. Tauris. 2007. ISBN 9781441615954. OCLC 430220001.
- O'Donoghue, Heather (17 July 2014). English poetry and Old Norse myth : a history. Oxford, United Kingdom. ISBN 9780191034367. OCLC 888057927.
- O'Donoghue, Heather (2021). Narrative in the Icelandic family saga : meanings of time in Old Norse literature. London, UK. ISBN 978-1-350-16744-5. OCLC 1198088531.
