= Faroese art =

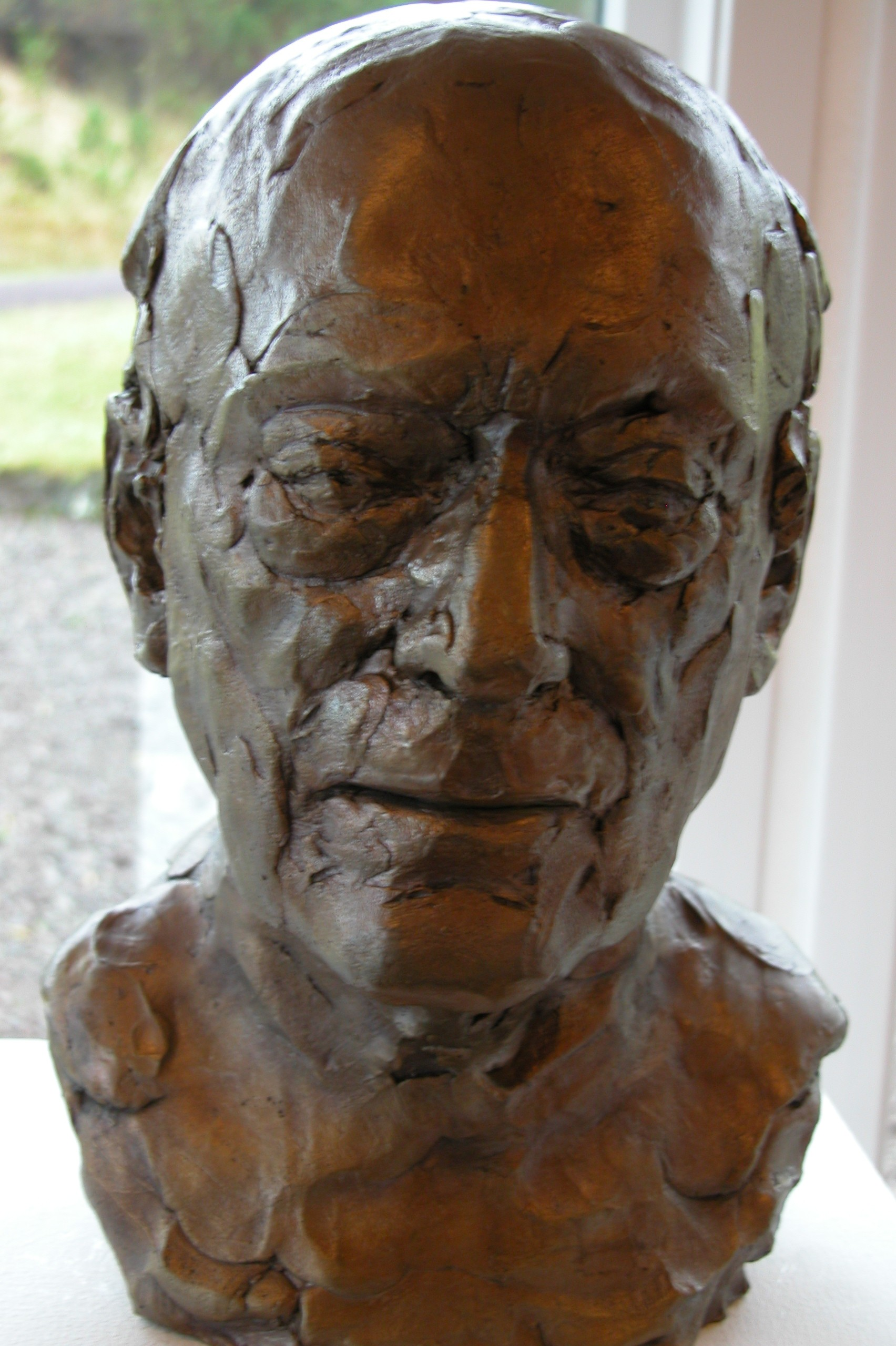
The very first Faroese sculptor Janus Kamban by artist Hans Pauli Olsen, the most successful and popular Faroese sculptor nowadays. He works mainly with bronze.

Faroese art is art by artists living in the Faroe Islands and art by Faroese nationals living abroad. In the Faroe Islands, art is an important part of everyday life and in the public debate. It may be the special light in the Faroes which causes so many to express themselves in painting. The ever-changing Faroese weather and light provide opportunities for endless nuances, something which has fascinated both foreign and local artists over the years. However, the history of Faroese art is short, and can only be dated a couple of hundred years back. Lack of time, light and materiel may have caused the late appearance of painting. But despite this, the islands have a very active art scene. A great many of the Faroese artists of today resent being reminded that Faroese art is a comparatively recent phenomenon. They find such an observation annoying as regards their artistic work, and they claim that such a statement has no bearing whatsoever on them as artists as their frame of reference is both local and global.

With the first Faroese painters the landscape became a national icon and it has remained the central topic in Faroese visual art. The grip that Faroese art, motifically speaking, takes on the Faroese landscape might seem to be a rather old-fashioned approach to visual art. The interest in installations, minimalism and conceptual art, has so far not affected Faroese art much. The village by the ocean is probably the motif which has been repeated the most. Danish art critic Ole Nørlyng concludes that nature, the wild landscape, is the driving force behind Faroese artists, but except for a close affinity with the landscape and culture of the islands, there has always been great diversity in Faroese art.

== Pioneers ==
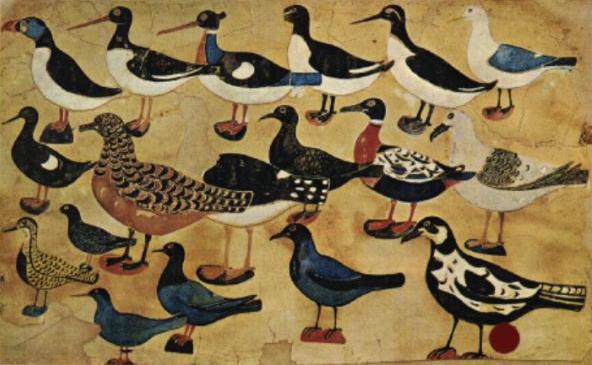
Díðrikur á Skarvanesi (1802–1865). This is one of the oldest preserved works in Faroese art. This painting together with four others by the same artist represent the beginning of the history of Faroese visuel art

The first paintings art historians are familiar with are those by Díðrikur í Kárastovu. He was a farmer who commonly was known as Díðrikur á Skarvanesi (1802–1865). Díðrikur was settled in a small village, Skarvanes, on the island Sandoy. His subjects were real and imaginary birds in vivid colours. Although not in perfect condition, five of his paintings have been preserved. They are a feature in the permanent exhibition at the national Faroese art museum, Listasavn Føroya. One of his better paintings is entitled Moon Doves.

Niels Kruse (1871–1951) was the first Faroese landscape painter, a theme which was to become a most common motif in Faroese art. Kruse lived in the village Eiði on the island Eysturoy. Kruse was almost completely self-taught. He was fortunate enough to receive some help and advice from an American explorer, Elizabeth Taylor, who stayed in the Faroes in 1895. In 1924 one of his works was accepted by a gallery in Denmark. This marked a turning point in Faroese art history, as this was the first time ever a painter had succeeded outside of the Islands. Kruse even managed to make a living from his painting, again something which earlier had been unheard of.

There were some other painters from this early generation. Both Kristin í Geil and Jógvan Waagstein are worth mentioning. Both of them were well settled in Tórshavn. And again, these two were self-taught landscape painters. As was the case with Kruse, Waagstein received knowledge and advice from Elizabeth Taylor. Later on í Geil received some schooling from Kruse. These two latter, however, never made their living exclusively from painting.

These painters were all pioneers in the field of visual art in the Faroes, and they helped to make their fellow countrymen aware of the art of painting. The late 19th century marks the beginning of a Faroese art tradition slowly developing for the first time. There are several reasons for this being so. The arrival of Elizabeth Taylor with her knowledge of art helped to inspired several to start painting. And most importantly the late 19th century sparked the beginning of the national movement. The national revival brought with it the love of the landscape - a brand new theme which was to become a national icon, more so than anywhere in visual art. The theme came to dominate all through the 20th century.

With the first painters, the love and affection of the homeland was obvious, and still in the 21st Century the theme is being treated by a new generation of artists. However, several painters contributed to Faroese artists developing a passion for many different styles and subjects.

== Mothers and fathers of Faroese art ==
The real history of Faroese art starts in 1927, when three young artists held an exhibition in Tórshavn. Two of these were Sámal Joensen-Mikines (1906–1979) and William Heinesen (1900–1990).

The first, Mikines, came to be known as the father of Faroese art and the first Faroese artist to become internationally recognised. More importantly he was the very first Faroese artist to acquire an artistic degree. Mikines began his education at the Academy of Fine Arts in Copenhagen in 1928 with Aksel Jørgensen and Ejnar Nielsen as his teachers. Mikines was artistically highly inspired by the Norwegian artist Edvard Munch, and had a great admiration for El Greco and Delacroix. His early paintings are naturalistic, but later he became an expressive figurative painter. He was very original in his choice of colour and design. Mikines demonstrated a new approach to substance and form in painting which had a profound influence on Faroese art. He painted funerals, steep mountains and landscapes. His paintings of pilot whaling became important to future artists. He introduced the possibility of allowing the landscape to mirror the painter's inner life.

William Heinesen was a very different type of artist. Literature was his vocation. Although he considered himself an amateur in visual art, he created some very important works in Faroese art. His imagery doesn't evolve around the landscape. Folktale, satire and everyday life are Heinesen's subjects.

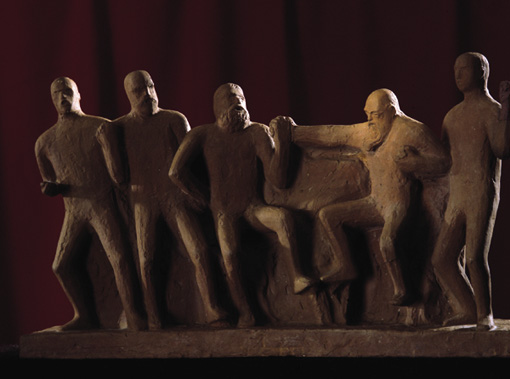
Chain Dance 1939 by Janus Kamban. Kamban was a Faroese sculptor and a representative of the "first generation" of professional artists in the Faroe Islands. Photo: Ole Wich

=== After World War II ===
During this period a new era had begun in Faroese visual art. Mikines wasn't the only one from his generation who received his formal training in Copenhagen. Faroese art experienced a virtual blossoming after World War II, when several talented and productive artists returned to the Faroe Islands after finishing their studies in Denmark. The range of motifs and styles were greatly expanded.

A new generation of artists, who had acquired artistic degrees didn't want to use their art for the sole purpose of expressing their love for their country. The ones who followed included the classical modernist Janus Kamban (1913–2009), the colourist Ruth Smith (1913–1958), the graphical artist Elinborg Lützen (1915–1995) and the great abstract painter Ingálvur av Reyni (1920–2005). Together with Mikines and Heinesen, these are the mothers and fathers of Faroese art.

- Kamban was the first Faroese sculptor. In style he ranges from the strictly naturalistic to the classically simple. His subjects are usually people, and he uses clay, bronze and basaltic rock for his sculptures. As a graphic artist, Kamban mostly portrays the Faroese landscape.
- Smith was one of the most talented Faroese artists. Her subjects were scenery and faces. She worked very consciously with colour. Over a period of twenty years she painted numerous self-portraits, one has been held as one of the finest portraits in Scandinavian art.
- Lützen's work is full of creatures from the world of myth, legend and folktale. With Lützen the graphic arts became an independent art form which enriched the artistic milieu through her all-absorbing interest in the technique of linocut, and the result of her artistic work is of high quality and intensity measured by any standard.
- Av Reyni has been the most influential of them all. The dynamic lines and the temperamental pastose brushwork has become a vital part the Faroese painting tradition. Av Reyni introduced cubism, abstract expressionism and suprematism to the Faroes. His early works were rather naturalistic landscapes, but in the early 1960s he dissolved the romantic and impressionist landscape, when he started to paint more and more abstract. His paintings usually contain a figurative core, which is described by the title of his paintings. As a black-and-white artist, he has drawn many portraits as well as landscapes. He is ranked as one of the great modernists in Scandinavia.

== Landscape expressionists ==
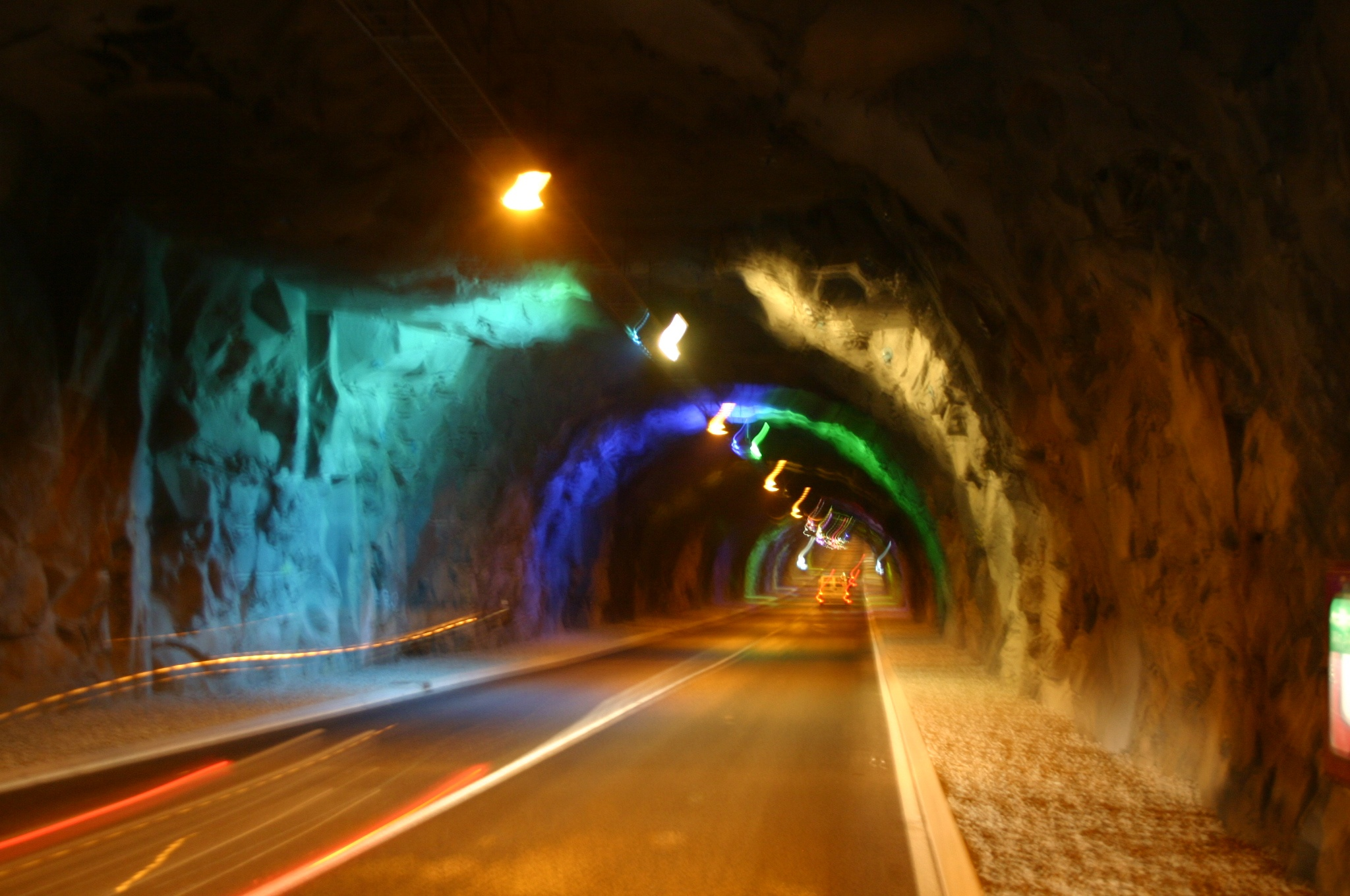
Light art inside deep-sea tunnel Norðoyatunnilin by Tróndur Patursson, who is well known both as a painter and as a sculptor. Above all, he is widely known for his glass paintings.

The common denomination “landscape expressionist” comprises a group of diverse artists, solely because the nature and landscape are central themes in their work. Zacharias Heinesen (1936), Thomas Arge (1942–1978), Tróndur Patursson (1943), Torbjørn Olsen (1956), Barður Jákupsson (1943) and Amariel Norðoy (1945) all belong to this group, as do many others. This large generation of painters from the 1930s to 1960's has been able to find common stylistic expressions. They exploit the full spectrum of the formal possibilities painting has to offer. They work with the unified whole and detail. Sometimes the subject matter almost disappears in the pure abstraction of the colours and forms, but rarely completely. A reminiscence of the landscape always remains. Not as a true-to-life reproduction, but as a landscape experience which is communicated via a variety of temperaments. So great has their contribution to Faroese art been that for a long time a genuine Faroese painting should preferably be a highly colouristic, expressive and semi abstract landscape, filled with North-Atlantic drama. It is not an unusual criticism that Faroese art relies too heavily on nature as a motif. But when the variety of expression is taken into account, the criticism doesn't seem fair.

- Zacharias Heinesen has in his paintings explored the light and colours of the landscape and tried to render the ephemeral moment.
- In Thomas Arge's paintings we get a glimpse of the inner structures, shapes and colours of the landscape.
- Bárður Jákupsson has found shapes and colours that others probably do not notice in Faroese Nature.
- In Tróndur Patursson's work it is the sense of immensity of nature that gains significance.
- The village by the ocean is probably the motif which has been repeated the most in Faroese art. In Countless paintings Amariel Norðoy has repeated the motif and shown it contains unlimited possibilities.

But despite the light and distinct colours of nature and scenery, Faroese art is not exclusively landscape.

== Contemporary Faroese art ==
The landscape has been the national theme of Faroese painting, arguably as a collectively chosen shell around the core of modern painting. In recent years, however, other subjects have emerged and appear to be edging out the landscape. The common denominator for the younger generation of Faroese artists is that they all have managed to outline new directions for Faroese art, while at the same time, relating with insight to the Faroese landscape tradition. The interest in the human mind, existential or philosophical questions or the internal landscapes seems to rise. The postmodern interest in contemporary philosophy, mass media and politics has begun to appear in Faroese art, and has emerged concomitantly with its appearance in other countries. One of the artist working in this field is Ole Wich (1953), who has worked with cross media art on the internet connected to present political and culturel issues in the faroese society, as well as conceptuel pieces places between visual expression and science.

The Faroese visual art has hardly ever been as manifold as it is today, although the genre remains traditional painting. There is a lot of pessimism among the artists themselves. They are doubtful of the future of Faroese art and they fear that the small-scaled nature and isolation of Faroese art may prove to be insurmountable handicaps. In the long run, they say 50,000 people and a couple of dozen artists will not be able to sustain a living artistic culture. Naturally, there is a danger that it might stagnate and die from lack of nourishment. At the same time, it is difficult to see how things could go so wrong while the need is so great.

There are many young artists who are currently identifying new paths for Faroese art. The younger generation of Faroese artists has mainly chosen to reside abroad as has Hansina Iversen, who is based in Copenhagen and Hanni Bjartalíð in Helsinki.

- Hansina Iversen (1966) ostensibly distances herself from nature as a motif. Her pictures are non-figurative and pure, seemingly purified of motif. The smooth fluency of her works are an exploration of the absolute and, thus, nature. Iversen has created a new philosophical approach to the Faroese Landscape tradition.
- Hanni Bjartalíð (1968) uses humour to describe man's relation to nature. His imagery is primarily of the modern world. Modern man's alienation from nature is a natural theme in his art. Bjartalíð demonstrates great freedom regarding Faroese and Nordic art landscape traditions, which are associated with romantic conception of a unique Nordic soul characterised by a close relation to nature.
- Edward Fuglø (1965) avoids landscapes; his symbolism concerns people. He creates surreal-comic and ironic paintings. Fuglø observes and mocks people – mostly men – in their absurd activities. The images are always pointed at political or perhaps art-political commentary. His imagery is in many ways innovative in the Faroese tradition. Fuglø is also one of the best illustrators in the Faroes.

== Art galleries ==
In the Faroe Islands there is a great interest in buying Faroese art to decorate your home with. This appreciation means that it is easy to find art galleries round about the islands. Some galleries are dedicated to local artists, while others have regular exhibitions. But the number of art galleries is highest in Tórshavn.

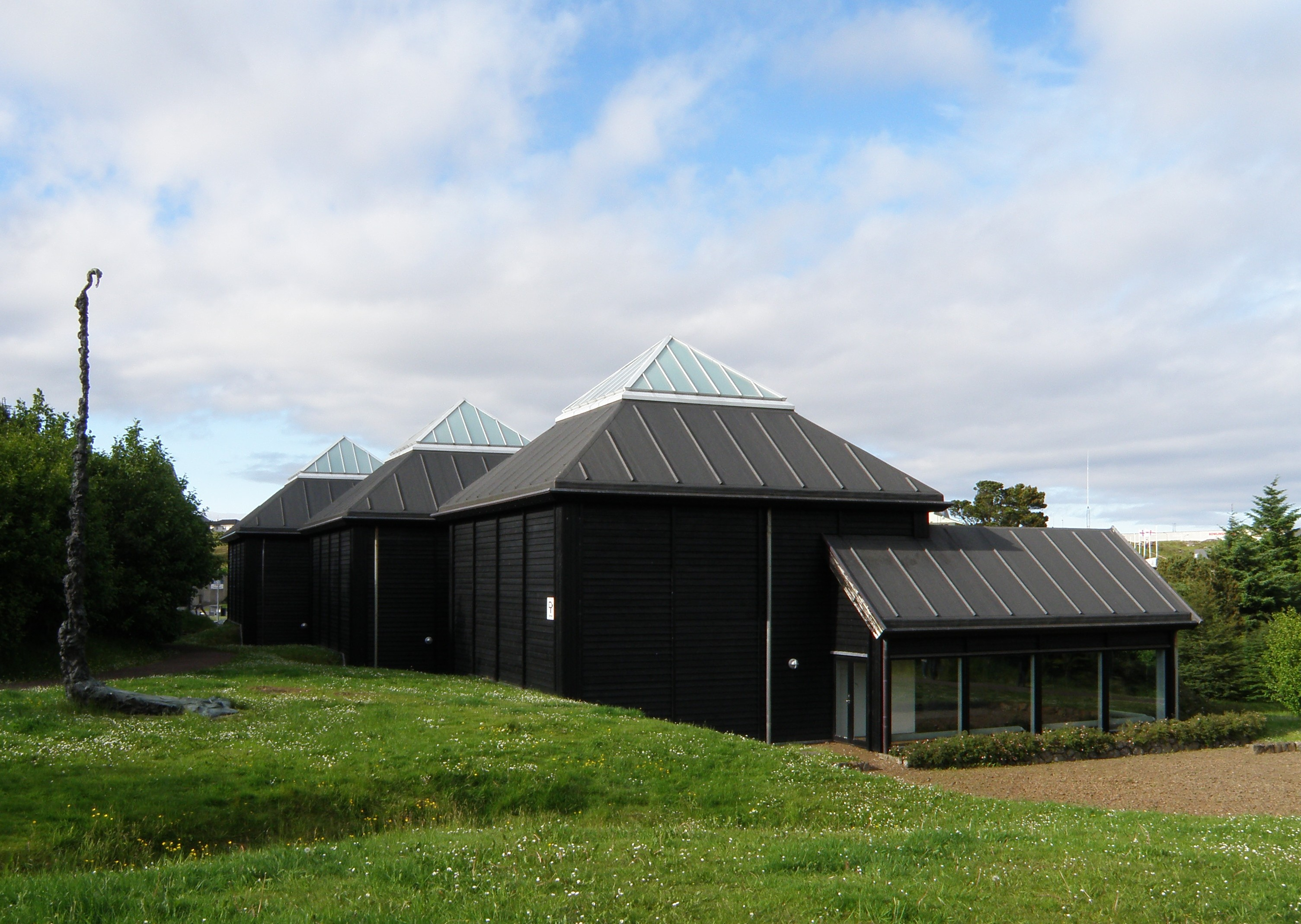
The largest collection af Faroese art is on display at Listasavn Føroya, the art museum in Tórshavn

- In Tórshavn you will find the national art museum Listasavn Føroya. The Art Museum was founded in 1989. The present gallery was opened in 1993. The exhibition building is faced with black tarred wood, and has elements of traditional Faroese building. It is surrounded by trees, as it is situated next to a park. The permanent collection displays some of the best works by William Heinesen, Ingálvur av Reyni and Sámal Mikines. Each year two exhibitions take place that focus exclusively on Faroese artists. The first one is the spring exhibition in May; the second is the annual Saint Olav's Day exhibition in late July. Whereas the first one exclusively features professional artists, the latter one mainly features amateurs.
- Listahøllin is situated in a green concrete building at Tórshavn Shipyard.
- In Vágur located in the island Suðuroy the southernmost island, there is a Ruth Smith Art Museum. The art museum has artworks (paintings and drawings) made by Ruth Smith.
- In Sandur, the main village on Sandoy, there is an art museum "Listasavnið á Sandi" with artworks (paintings, sculptures etc.) by various Faroese artists. The art collection and the museum building was donated to the village in 2005 by a Sofus Olsen, who grew up in Sandur, but lived in Tórshavn for many years. The museum opened on his 92nd birthday.

== Art on stamps ==
Several paintings by Faroese artists have been featured on stamps. All Faroese stamp editions are about items relating to the Faroes and most of them are designed by Faroese artists. Faroese art is among the main motifs, both in reproductions of important paintings and in involving the artists in drawing stamps.

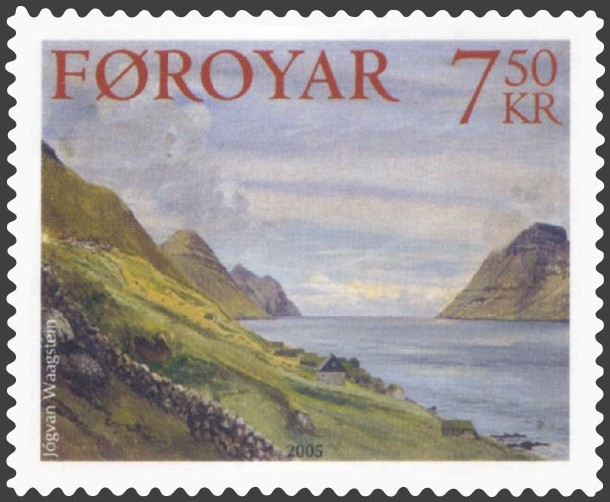
Syðradalur by Jógvan Waagstein

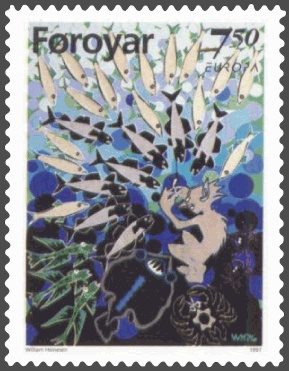
The little Merman by William Heinesen

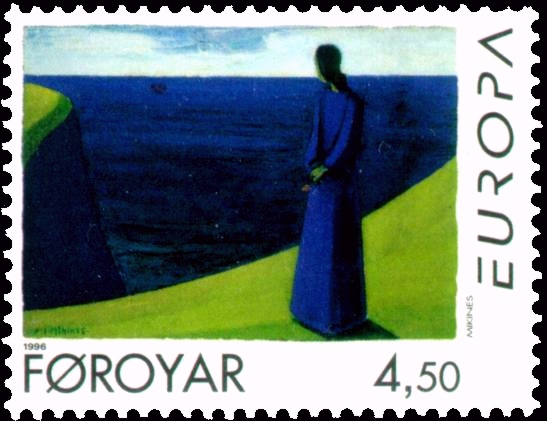
Departure by Sámal Mikines

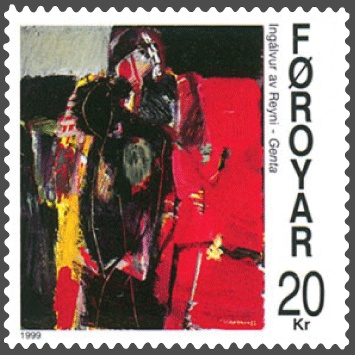
Girl by av Ingálvur av Reyni

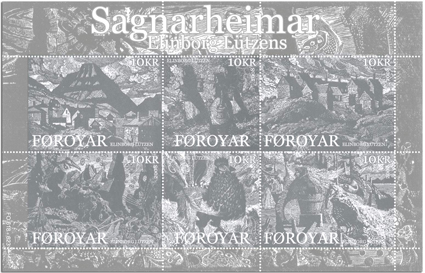
Magical Worlds by Elinborg Lutzen

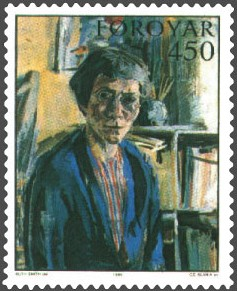
Self Portrait by Ruth Smith

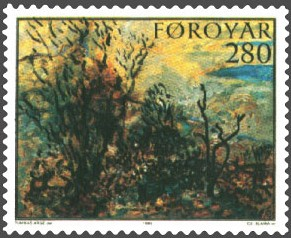
The Garden by Thomas Arge

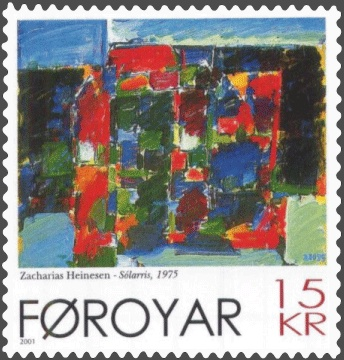
Sunrise by Zacharias Heinesen

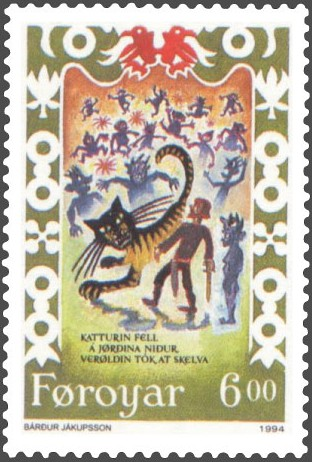
Ormar Kills the Cat by Bárður Jákupsson

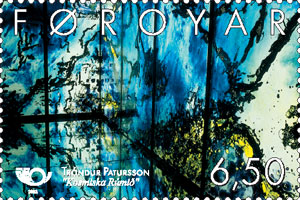
Glass art by Tróndur Patursson

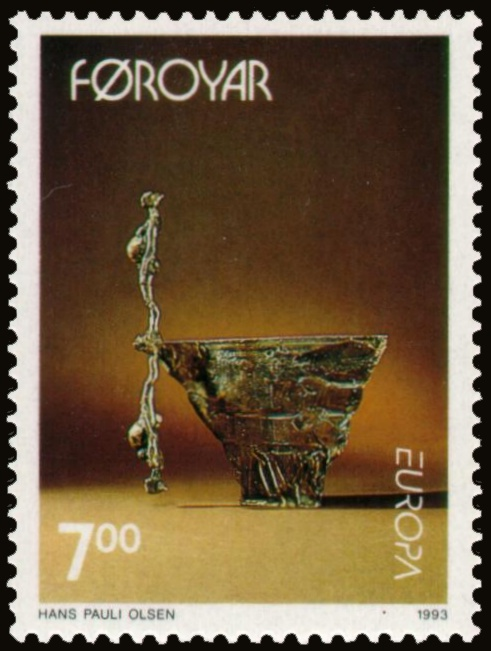
Reflection by Hans Pauli Olsen.

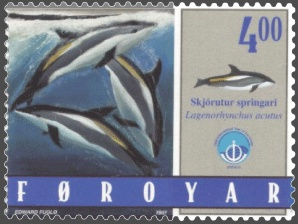
Illustration of Atlantic white sided dolphin by Edward Fuglø

== See also ==
- Faroese literature
- List of Notable Faroese
- Music of the Faroe Islands
- Nordic House in the Faroe Islands
