= Heðin Brú =

Faroese novelist and translator

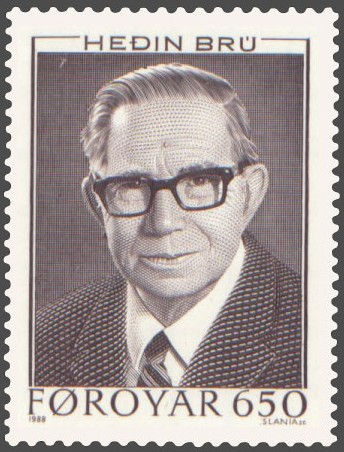
- 1988 Faroese commemorative stamp.
- Born: August 17, 1901; Skálavík
- Died: May 18, 1987 (aged 86); Tórshavn

Heðin Brú (pronounced [ˈhejɪn bɹʉu]; August 17, 1901 – May 18, 1987) was the pen-name of Hans Jacob Jacobsen, a Faroese novelist and translator.

Heðin Brú is considered to be the most important Faroese writer of his generation and is known for his fresh and ironic style. His novel, Feðgar á ferð (The Old Man and His Sons), was chosen as the Book of the twentieth century by the Faroese.

== Life and Works ==
Hans Jacobsen was born in 1901 in Skálavík. Like many of his countrymen, Jacobsen worked as a fisherman in his early years. After two seasons, he left to study agriculture in Denmark. When he returned to the Faroes, he worked as an agricultural advisor—a job that took him to all parts of the country. The contacts he made with ordinary village people he met during this time had a lasting effect on his writing.

In 1930, his first novel, Lognbrá, which tells the story of a young man growing up in a Faroese village, was published. In 1935 there appeared its sequel, Fastatøkur, in which the young man works as a fisherman on a sloop. Both of these books were translated into Danish in 1946 and published under the title Høgni.

Feðgar á ferð, Brú's most famous work, was published in Faroese in 1940, in Danish in 1962 (Fattigmandsære), in German in 1966 (Des armen Mannes Ehre, a translation of the Danish title), and in English in 1970 under the title of The Old Man and his Sons. This was his first novel to be translated from Faroese into English. It tells the tale of the transformation of a rural society into a modern nation of fisheries and the conflicts between generations that result.

In 1963, he satirised the Faroese politics of the interwar period in his novel Leikum fagurt. His Men livið lær (1970) describes a Faroese village around 1800, and his Tað stóra takið of 1972 describes a similar village around a century later. While writing these novels, Heðin Brú also wrote three collections of novellas and translated two Shakespeare plays (Hamlet and The Tempest). He translated many pieces of world literature into Faroese. Between 1959 and 1974, he published a six-volume collection of Faroese fairy tales, Ævintýr I – VI (with illustrations by Elinborg Lützen). This is considered to be the standard work on the subject.

Jacobsen died in 1987 in Tórshavn. His son, Bárður Jákupsson, is considered by the Faroese to be the country's most important contemporary visual artist.

== Works ==
- Lognbrá. 1930 (Novel. many editions)
- Fastatøkur. 1935 (Novel. many editions)
  - Berättelsen om Högni; Translation from Faroese into Swedish by Niels Edberg and Sigfrid Lindström. Lund: Gleerups Förlag, 1939 - 440 pg.
  - Högni. Romanzo delle Faer-Öer; Translation into Italian by Piero Monaci. Milano: A Mondadori, 1942
  - Högni; Translation into Spanish by Angel Giménez Ortiz. Barcelona: Hispano Americana de Ediciones, 1946 - 325 pg.
- Fjallaskuggin. 1936 (Short stories)
  - Fjallaskuggin; Illustrated by Bárður Jákupsson. Tórshavn: Self-published, 1967 - 135 pg. (2 initial editions, then more)
    - Fjeldskyggen, noveller og skitser; Translation into Danish by Gunnvá and Povl Skårup. Copenhagen: Gyldendal, 1963 - 140 pg.
    - Fjällskuggan och andra noveller från Färöarna; Auswahl und Translation into Swedish by Birgitta Hylin; Cover image by Bárður Jákupsson. Stockholm: P.A. Norstedt & Söners förlag, 1981 - 169 pg.
    - from it: The White Church in: Sven H. Rossel (ed.): Christmas in Scandinavia. University of Nebraska Press, 1996 - 182 pg. ISBN 0-8032-3907-6 (more than one author)
- Grái táttur in: Sosialurin, 1938 (Satire In Faroese on the Internet)
- Feðgar á ferð. Tórshavn: Varðin, 1940 - 160 pg. (Novel. at least 5 editions)
  - Feðgar á ferð; Translation into Icelandic by Aðalsteinn Sigmundsson. Reykjavík: Víkingsútgáfan, 1941 - 208 pg.
  - Fattigmandsære; Translation into Danish by Gunnvá and Povl Skårup; foreword by William Heinesen. Kopenhagen: Gyldendal, 1962 - 146 pg.
  - Fattigfolk på ferde; Translation into Norwegian by Ivar Eskeland; foreword by William Heinesen. Oslo: Det Norske Samlaget, 1964 - 152 pg.
  - Des armen Mannes Ehre; from the Danish translation by Alfred Anderau. With illustrations by Camille Corti and an afterword by William Heinesen (p. 221-223). Zürich: Flamberg, 1966 - 223 pg.
  - nîsarnarsuíngôk / nugterissok; Translation from the Danish into Greenlandic by Jørgen Fleischer. Godthåb: Det Grønlandske Forlag, 1967 - 128 pg.
  - The old man and his sons; Translation into English and a foreword by John F. West; Drawings by Bárður Jákupsson. New York: Paul S. Eriksson, 1970 - 203 pg. ISBN 0-8397-8412-0
  - Honor biedaka; Translation into Polish by Henryk Anders and Maria Krysztofiak. Poznań: Wydawnictwo Poznańskie, 1970 - 154 pg.
  - Ketil und die Wale; Translation from the Danish by Ernst Walter with references to the Faroese original. With an afterword by the translator (s. 187-192). Rostock: Hinstorff, 1971 - 192 pg.
  - Fattigmans heder; Translation into Swedish by Birgitta Hylin; Cover image by William Heinesen. Stockholm: Bokförlaget Pan/Norstedts, 1977 - 137 pg.
- Flókatrøll. Copenhagen: Bókadeild Føroyingafelags, 1948 - 128 pg. (Short stories. Translated together with Fjallaskuggin 1936. s.o.)
  - from this: Niklas Niklái (Esperanto 1949, 4 pg.)
- Ævintýr; Illustrations by Elinborg Lützen. Tórshavn: Føroya lærarafelag, 1959-1974 - 6 Volumes (Collection of Faroese Faity Tales. Two editions published since 1974)
- Føroyingasøga. Translations from Old Norse into Faroese by Heðin Brú and Rikard Long. Tórshavn: Skúlabókagrunnurin, 1962 - 105 pg.
- Leikum fagurt ...; Single volume format by Bárður Jákupsson. Tórshavn: Self-published, 1963 - 195 pg. (many editions)
- Purkhús. 1966, Tórshavn (short stories); illustrations by Bárður Jákupsson
  - from it: Einsamallur í Lítlu Dímun, translated into English and published in The Threepenny Review, Issue 148: Winter 2017, as Alone on Lítla Dímun; translated by Henrik Bergquist
- Men lívið lær. Tórshavn: Varðin, 1970 - 321 S. (many editions, most recently as a schoolbook in 2001, ISBN 99918-0-267-3)
- Búravnurin ; Cover image by Bárður Jákupsson. Tórshavn: Emil Thomsen, 1971 - 128 pg.
- Tað stóra takið; Cover image by Bárður Jákupsson. 1 edition, Tórshavn: Bókagarður, Emil Thomsen, 1972 - 251 pg.
- Endurminningar; Cover layout by William Heinesen. Tórshavn: Bókagarður, Emil Thomsen, 1980 - 389 pg. (Memoir. pub. in 2001 as a book tape, 15 tapes)

== Translations ==
The following works of world literature were translated by Heðin Brú into Faroese:

- Anton Pavlovich Chekhov: Másin. (Russ. Чайка. Without publisher or year. Available in the Faroese National Library, 59 pages. The piece was performed in the Faroes, but has not yet been released as a book)
- "William Shakespeare: Harðveðrið". In: Varðin 39, (Tórshavn) 1964 (engl. The Tempest)
- William Shakespeare: Hamlet, prinsur av Danmørk. Tórshavn: Varðin, 1969 - 244 pg. (Engl. Hamlet, Prince of Denmark)
- Henrik Ibsen: Hedda Gabler. Sjónleikur í fýra pørtum. Tórshavn: Havnar sjónleikarfelag, 1969 - 108 pg.
- Knut Hamsun: Vælferðin; Drawings by Bárður Jákupsson. Tórshavn: Bókagarður, Emil Thomsen, 1972 - 326 pg.
- William Heinesen: Móðir Sjeystjørna; Title image by William Heinesen. Tórshavn: Emil Thomsen, 1975 - 135 pg.
- William Heinesen: Glataðu spælimenninir; Title image by William Heinesen. Tórshavn: Emil Thomsen, 1975 - 298 pg.
- Fyodor Mikhailovich Dostoevsky: Tey á Steffansleiti. Tórshavn: Emil Thomsen, 1977 - 238 pg. (The Village of Stepanchikovo)
- Fyodor Mikhailovich Dostoevsky: Karamasov-brøðurnir; Cover image by William Heinesen. Tórshavn: Bókagarður, Emil Thomsen, 1978 - 3 Volumes, IX+452, 382, 458 pg. (Russ. Братья Карамазовы - The Brothers Karamazov)
- Münchhausen greivi - sigur frá; Drawings by Zacharias Heinesen. Tórshavn: Føroya lærarafelag, 1978 - 175 pg.
- Astrid Lindgren: Brøðurnir Leyvuhjarta. Tórshavn: Varðin, 1980 - 242 pg. (swed. Bröderna Lejonhjärta - The Brothers Lionheart)
- Brothers Grimm: Tann stóra ævintýrbókin. Tórshavn: Føroya lærarafelag, 1981 - 125 pg. ("The Great Fairy Tale Book"; Grimms' Fairy Tales)
- Emily Brontë: Harðförar hæddir; Title image by William Heinesen. Tórshavn: Bókagarður, Emil Thomsen, 1984 - 376 pg. (Engl. Wuthering Heights)
- Astrid Lindgren: Søgur; Translations into Faroese by Heðin Brú et al. Velbastað: Dropin, 1986 - 263 pg. ("Histories")
- Brothers Grimm: Ævintýrbókin; Translations into Faroese by Heðin Brú et al. Tórshavn: Føroya lærarafelag, 1989 - 251 pg. ("The Fairy Tale Book"; Grimms' Fairy Tales)

== Honors ==
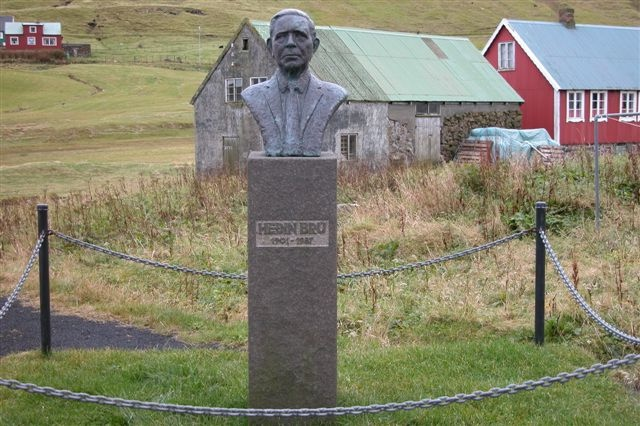
Heðin Brú Memorial in his hometown of Skálavík

- 1964: The Faroese Literature Prize
- 1964: Statens Kunstfond (for Fjeldskyggen)
- 1980: Together with Elinborg Lützen: The Children's Book Prize of the Community of Tórshavn (for Ævintýr I-VI)
- 1982: The Holberg Medal
