= Steffan Danielsen =

Faroese painter (1922–1976)

- Born: 3 September 1922; Nólsoy, Faroe Islands
- Died: 28 May 1976 (aged 53); Tórshavn, Faroe Islands
- Occupation: painter

Johan Steffan Danielsen (3 September 1922 – 28 May 1976) was a Faroese painter.

== Life and work ==
The self-taught artist Steffan Danielsen was born in Nólsoy, Faroe Islands. He found most of the inspiration for his pictures in his home village Nólsoy and the island of same name. In his art Danielsen distils the essence of the landscape in an original way.

Bárður Jákupsson in his book Færøernes billedkunst (Färöi screen end art) compares Danielsen with the classical author Sámal Mikines, who lived on a similarly small, remote and inaccessible Faroe Island: Mykines. Both islands have important bird colonies and both islands have only one village. Danielsen spent most of his 24 productive years on Nólsoy, with just one period abroad in Denmark between 1951 and 1956. His first exhibition in 1952 in Ólavsøka brought him to the attention of the Faroese art community.

Danielsen's paintings describe his homeland island in everyday detail, capturing not only the landscapes, boats, buildings but also the atmosphere and spirit of the place. He captures the light, with sun and rain, snow and fog, and the predominantly red tones allude sensitively to the colour nuances of the Faroese landscape.

Danielsen died in Tórshavn, Faroe Islands.

== Gallery ==
His paintings of Nólsoy were featured on a series of Faroese stamps in 1990:

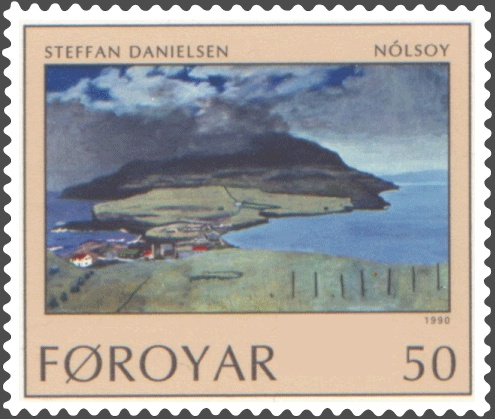
FR 201

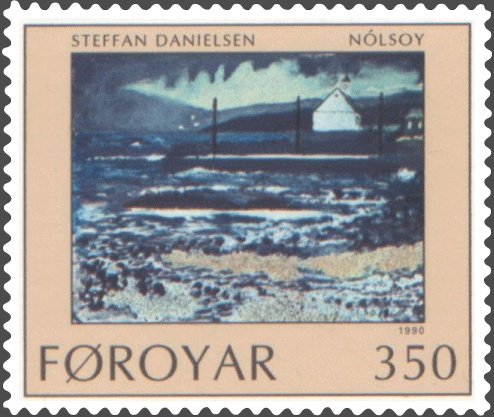
FR 202

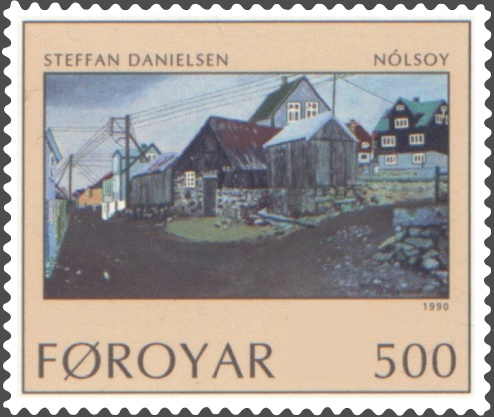
FR 203

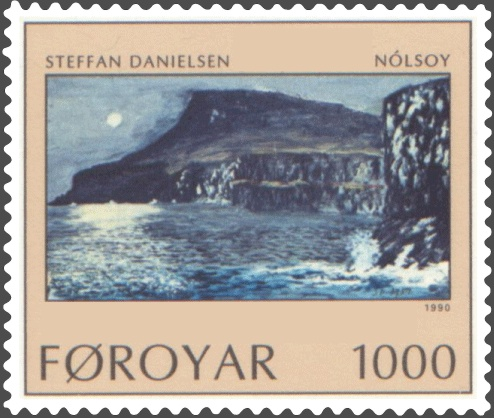
FR 204

and also in this stamp of 1985:

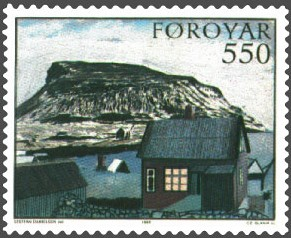
Stamp FR 114: Winter day, Nólsoy 1959, 65x87cm, Listasavn Føroya (The Faroe Islands Art Museum)

== See also ==
- Art of the Faroe Islands
