= Bjartalíð =

Bjartalíð is a Faroese surname. Notable people with the surname include:

- Hanni Bjartalíð (born 1968), Faroese painter
- Jóannes Bjartalíð (born 1996), Faroese footballer
