= Díðrikur á Skarvanesi =

Faroese painter

- Born: 25 July 1802; Stóra Dímun
- Died: 8 October 1865 (aged 63); Skarvanes
- Known for: Painting

Díðrikur á Skarvanesi also called Díðrikur í Kárastovu (25 July 1802 – 8 October 1865), was born in Dímun and died in Skarvanes.

Díðrikiur á Skarvanesi was a bird painter. He was self-taught, the only kind of art education he had was when he went on a study tour to Copenhagen in 1828. Only five of his paintings have been preserved. His work is on permanent exhibition at the Listasavn Føroya (Faroe Islands Art Museum). In 2020 one of his images of fanciful "Moon Pigeons" was used on a 20KR Faroe Islands stamp.

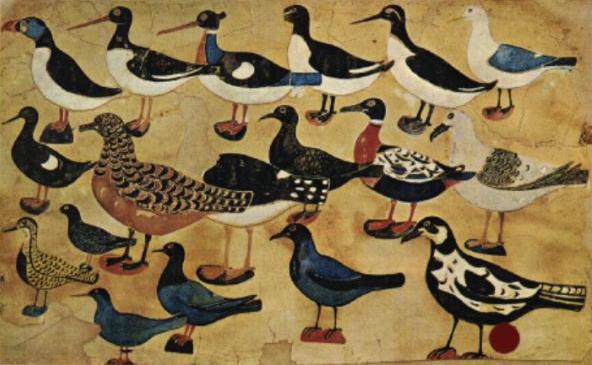
Painting of Birds by Díðrikur á Skarvanesi held at Listasavn Føroya
