= No One Can Achieve Perfection =

2008 film by Katrin Ottarsdóttir

- Directed by: Katrin Ottarsdóttir
- Written by: Katrin Ottarsdóttir
- Produced by: Hugin Eide
- Cinematography: Katrin Ottarsdóttir
- Edited by: Katrin Ottarsdóttir
- Distributed by: Blue Bird Film
- Release date: 30 January 2008
- Running time: 85 minutes
- Country: Denmark
- Language: Faroese

No One Can Achieve Perfection (Faroese: Eingin kann gera tað perfekta) is a 2008 documentary film directed by Katrin Ottarsdóttir. It is a portrait of the Faroese sculptor Hans Pauli Olsen (born 1957).

== Synopsis ==
The film follows the creation of sculptor Hans Pauli Olsen's biggest sculpture so far. We take part in the process when the artist is working in his backyard studio together with his young nude model. We are the fly on the wall, when the artist forgets about the camera and exists only for creating his art with his bare hands. And we experience the contrast between art as subtle, exhibited works in distinguished halls of art and as a simple lump of clay in a dirty garage.
