= The Old Man and his Sons (novel) =

Novel by Heðin Brú

- Cover of 2011 English edition
- Author: Heðin Brú
- Original title: Feðgar á ferð
- Translator: John F. West
- Language: Faroese
- Publication date: 1940
- Publication place: Faroes
- English publication date: 1970

The Old Man and his Sons (Faroese: Feðgar á ferð) is a novel by Faroese writer Heðin Brú, first published in 1940. It tells the tale of the transformation of a rural society into a modern nation of fisheries and the conflicts between generations that result.

== Description ==
Feðgar á ferð is Brú's most famous work and was translated into Danish in 1962 (Fattigmandsære), to German in 1966 (Des armen Mannes Ehre, a translation of the Danish title), and to English by John F. West in 1970 under the title of The Old Man and his Sons. This was the first novel to be translated from Faroese into English, and has been translated to nine languages in total.

The Old Man and His Sons was chosen as the Book of the twentieth century by the Faroese.
