= Skálavík =

Skálavík Skålevig (Danish)
- Municipality and village
- Skálavík Municipality; Skálavíkar kommuna (Faroese)
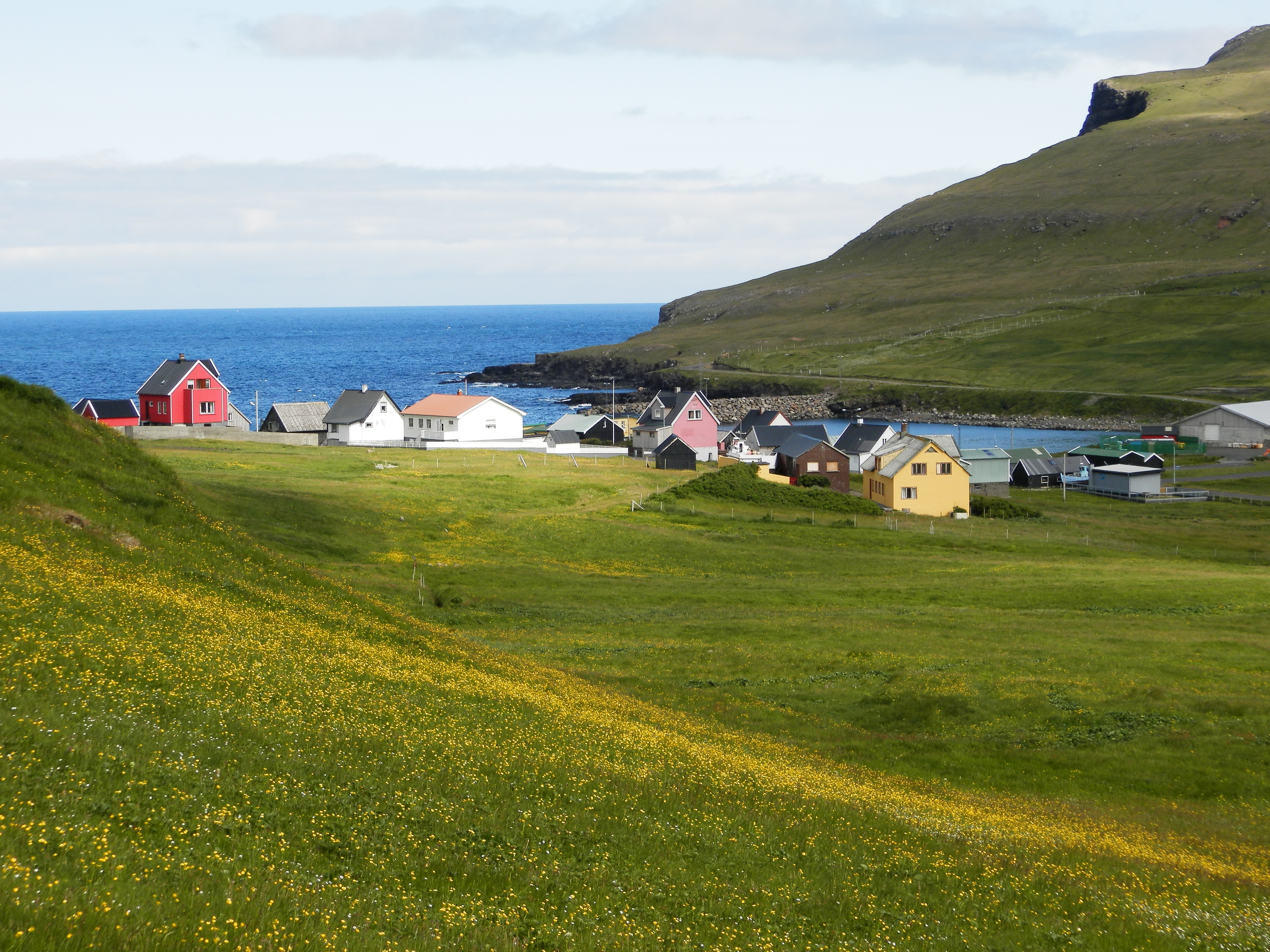
- Skálavík in July 2012

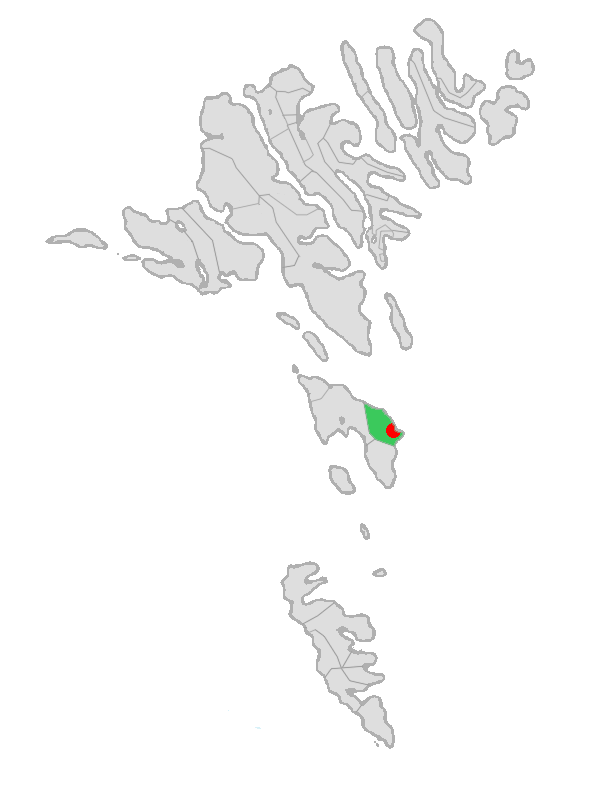
- Location of Skálavíkar kommuna in the Faroe Islands

- Location of Skálavík village in the Faroe Islands
- Coordinates: 61°50′0″N 6°39′0″W
- State: Kingdom of Denmark
- Constituent country: Faroe Islands
- Island: Sandoy

Population (September 2025)
  - Total: 154
- Time zone: GMT
  - Summer (DST): UTC+1 (WEST)
- Postal code: FO 220
- Climate: Cfc
- Website: http://www.sandoyggin.fo/fo-FO/Skalavikar-kommuna.aspx

Skálavík (Danish: Skålevig) is a village and municipality on the eastern coast of the Faroese island Sandoy.

== Name ==
The name Skálavík comes from Faroese language common noun skál (bowl)+ vík (bay), meaning a bowl-shaped bay.

== History ==
The village's stone church was built in 1891. The famous Faroese writers Heðin Brú (born Hans Jacob Jacobsen) (1901–1987) and Kristian Osvald Viderø (1906–1988) were both born in Skálavík.

In late January 2008 Skálavík was hit by a strong hurricane. The port was destroyed, along with many boats and houses. The damage was so great that emergency aid was provided from Iceland.

== Depilin í Skálavík - Hotel Skálavík ==
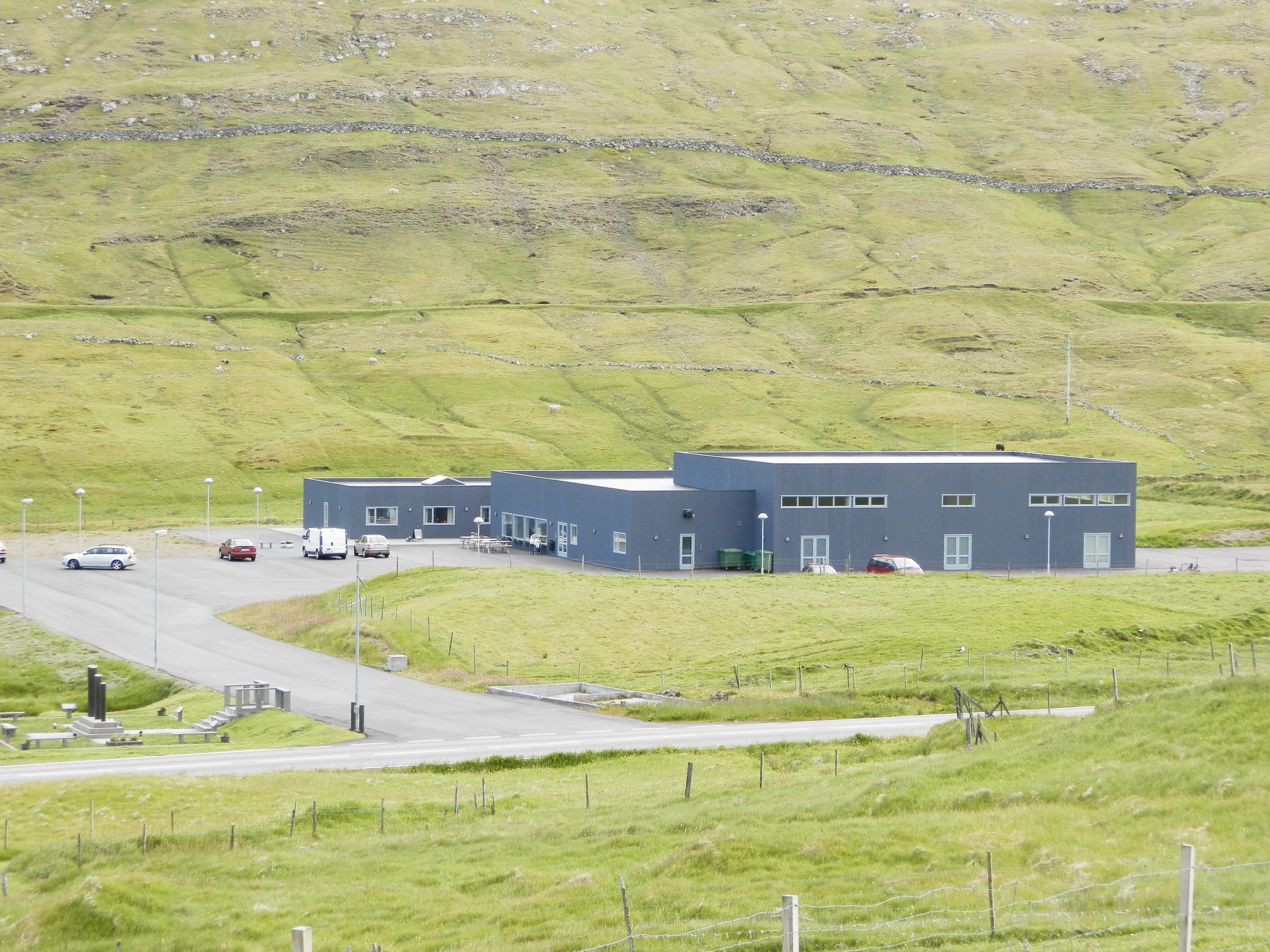
Depilin í Skálavík

In May 2011 a new center opened in Skálavík. It was donated by shipowner Eiler Jacobsen (1930-2010), who was born in the village. He did not live to see the opening, but he visited the building during the construction. There is a restaurant, a hotel and conference center, activities for children etc. The center was named Skeiðs- og frítíðardepilin Immanuel, but they also use the name "Depilin í Skálavík" (The Center in Skálavík). It was named Immanuel after the ship by the same name in which Eiler Jacobsen's father went missing in 1932.

On 23 March 2015 Smyril Line took over the operation of the hotel, and at the same time the name was changed to Hotel Skálavík. The hotel had 25 rooms at the time.

== See also ==
- List of towns in the Faroe Islands

== Gallery ==
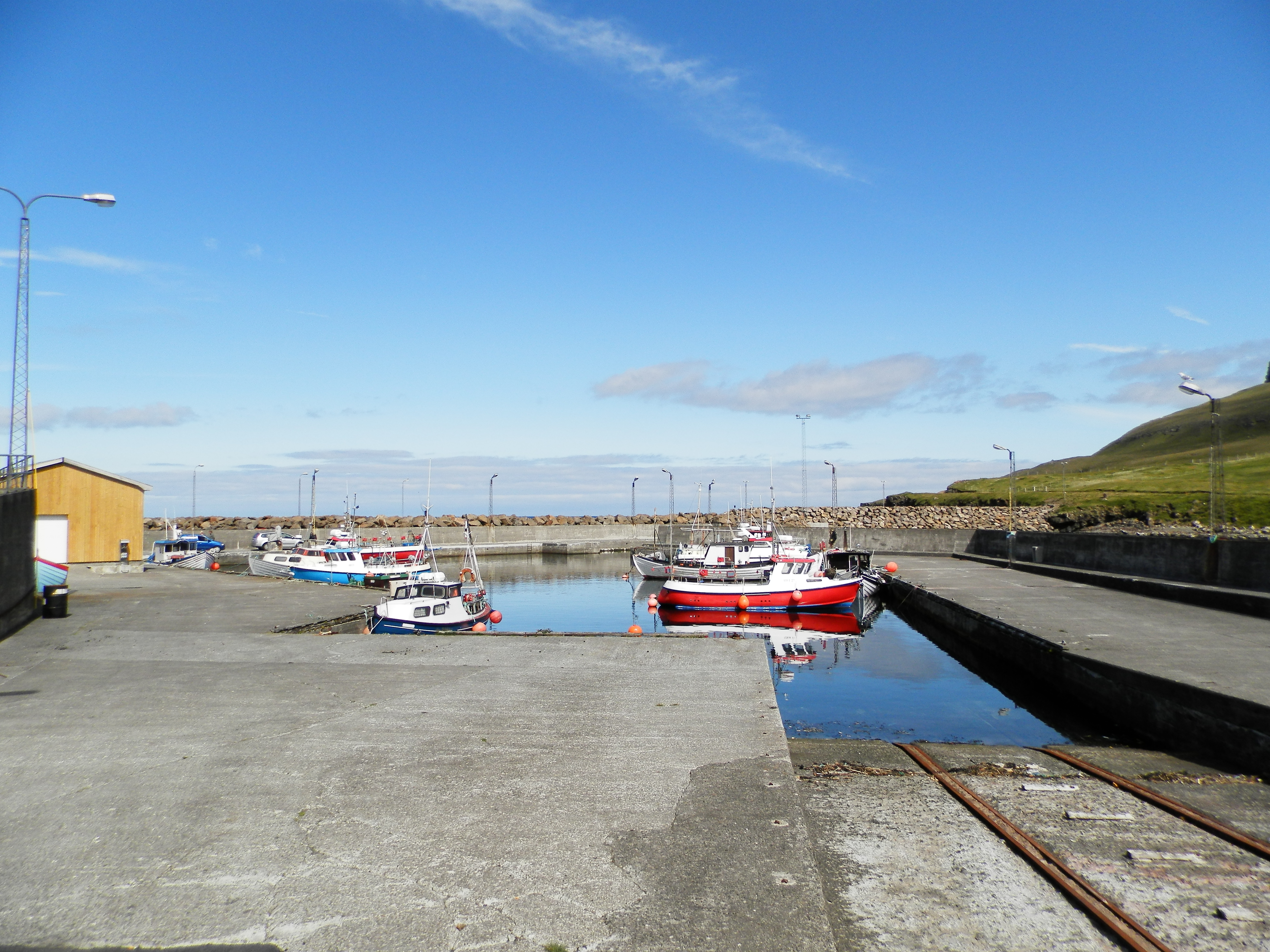
The harbour of Skálavík

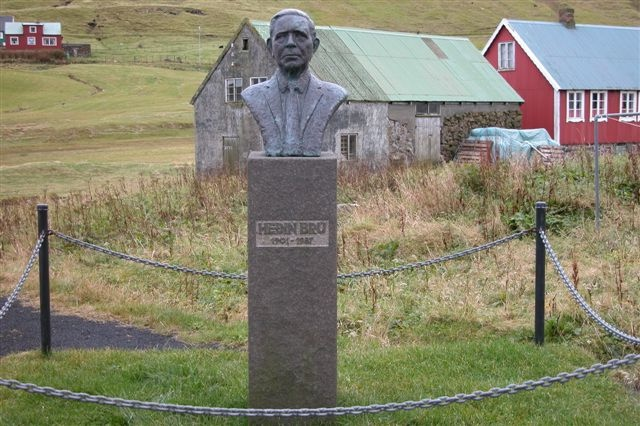
Heðin Brú (Hans Jacob Jacobsen) memorial bust.

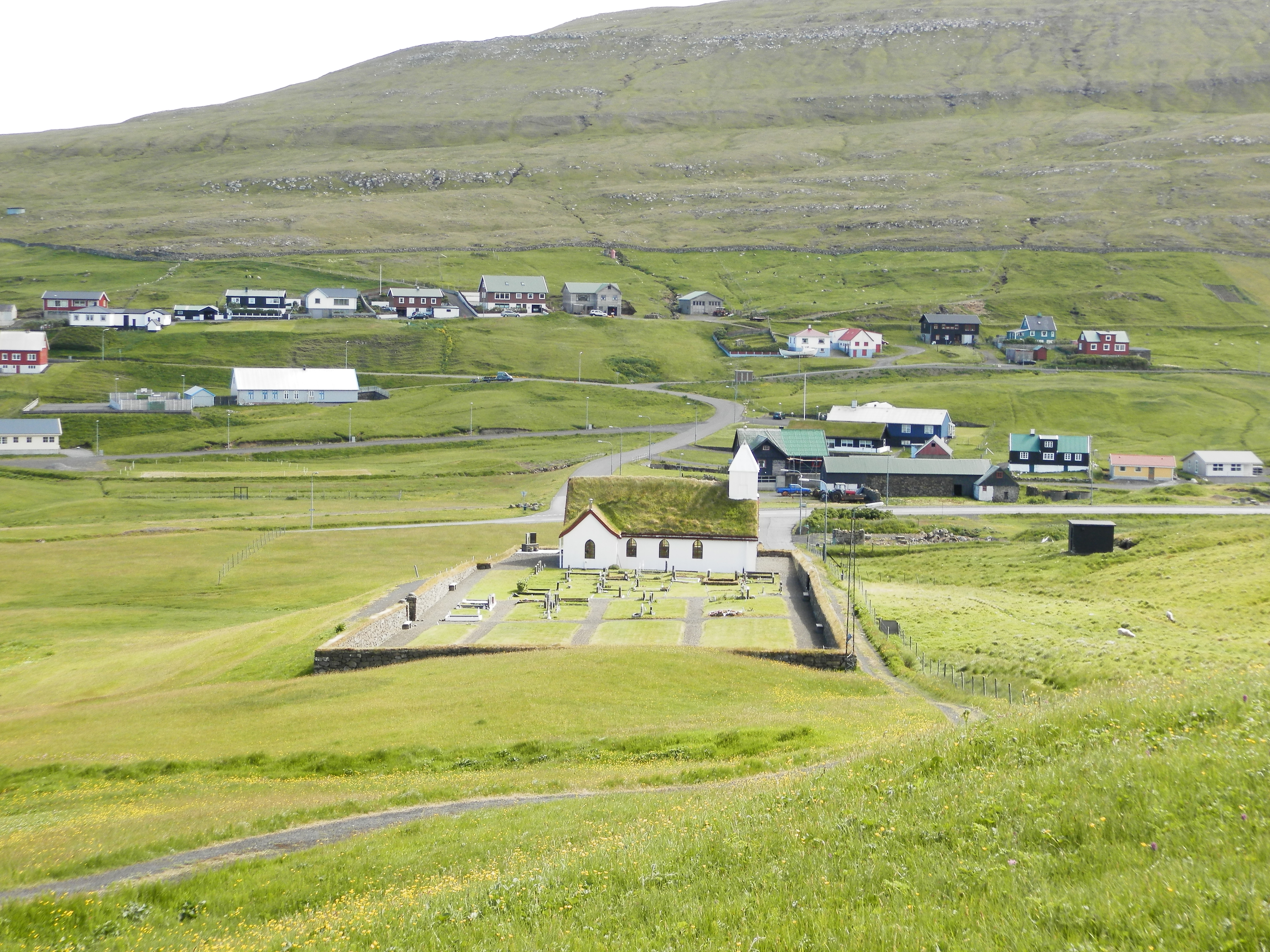
The church in Skálavík and a part of the village.

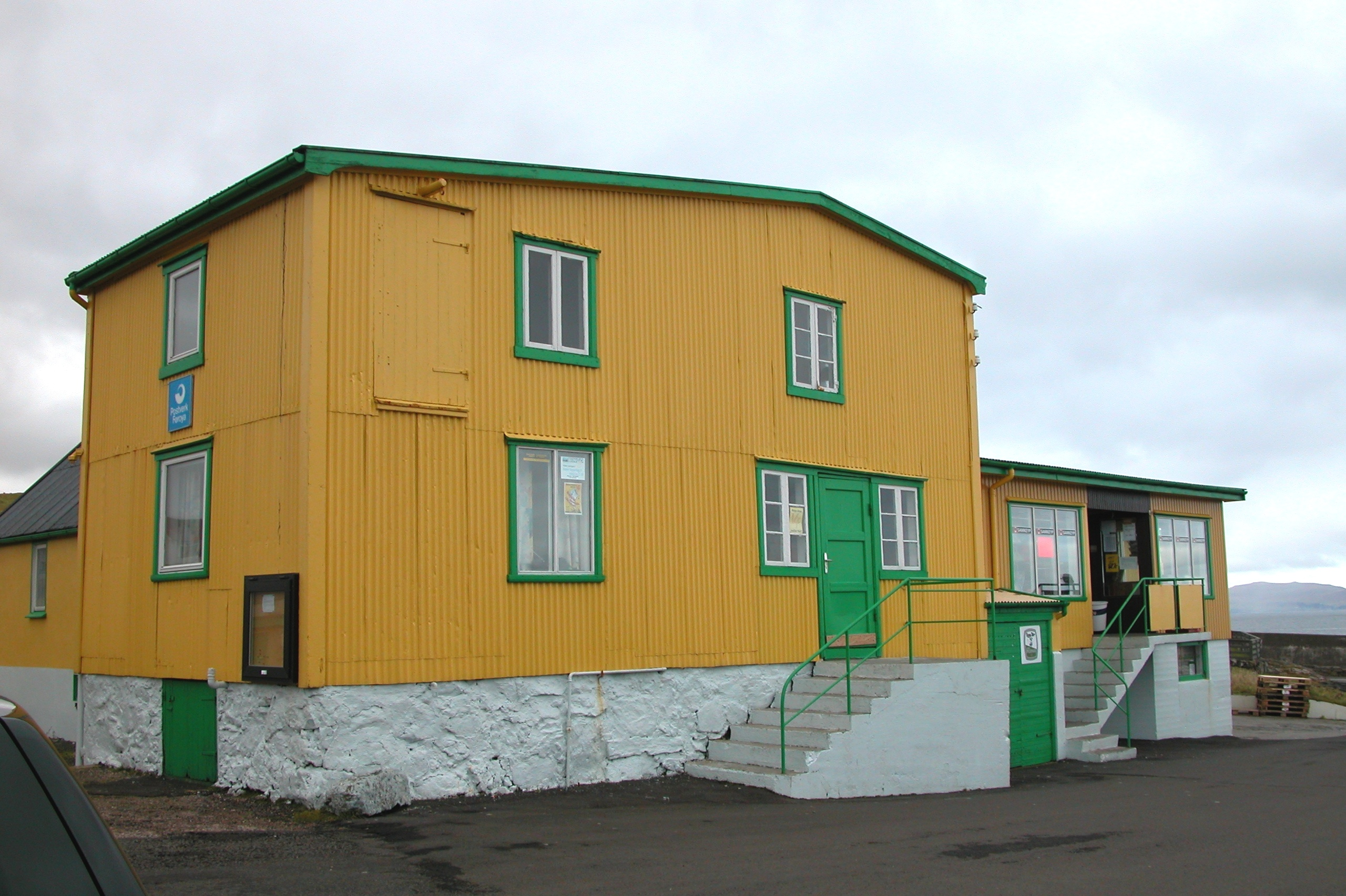
Former post office, now the only store in the island Sandoy, which sells alcohol, it is called Rúsan (short for Rúsdrekkasøla Landsins).

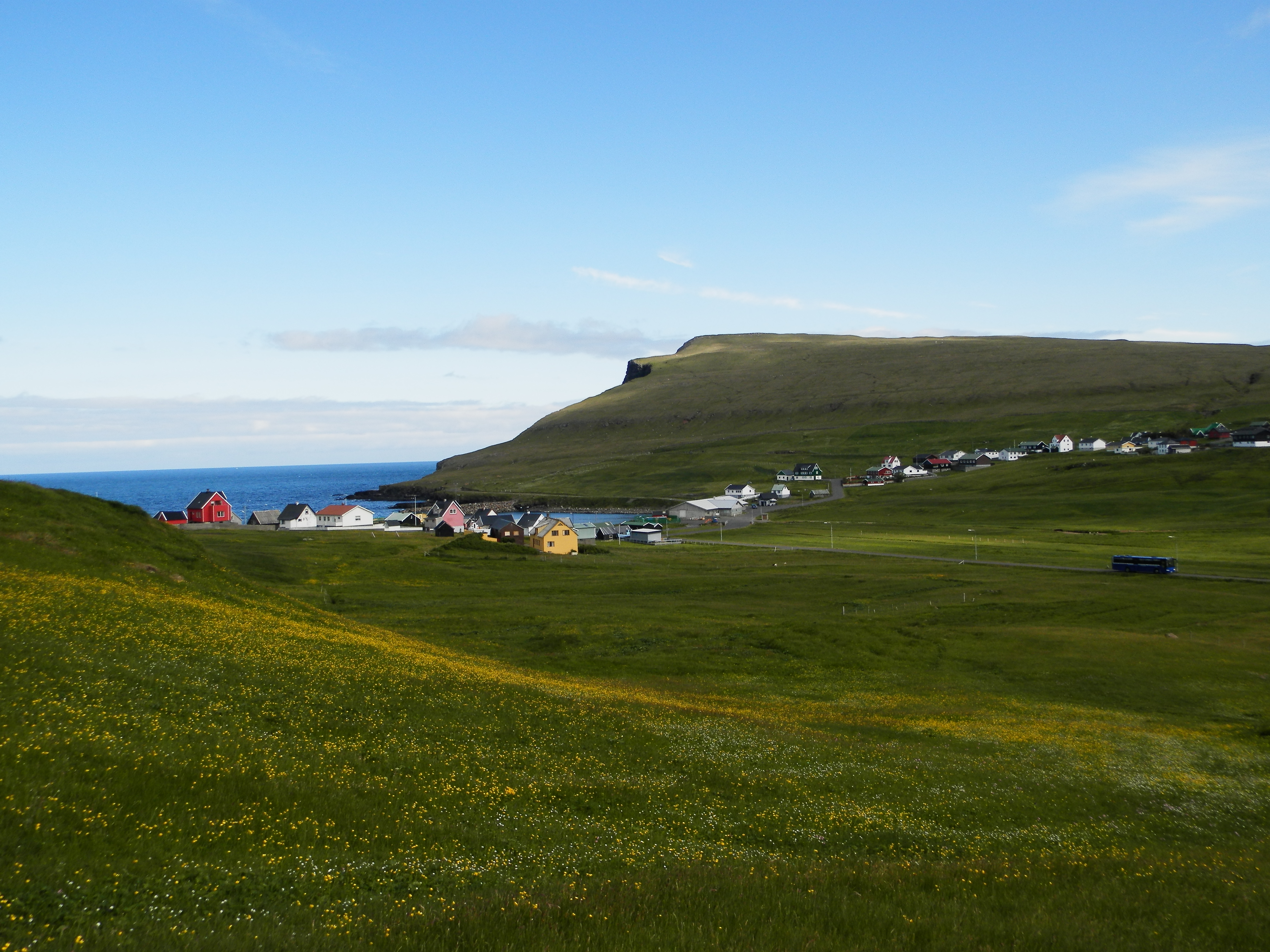
Skálavík
