= Janus Kamban =

Faroese sculptor

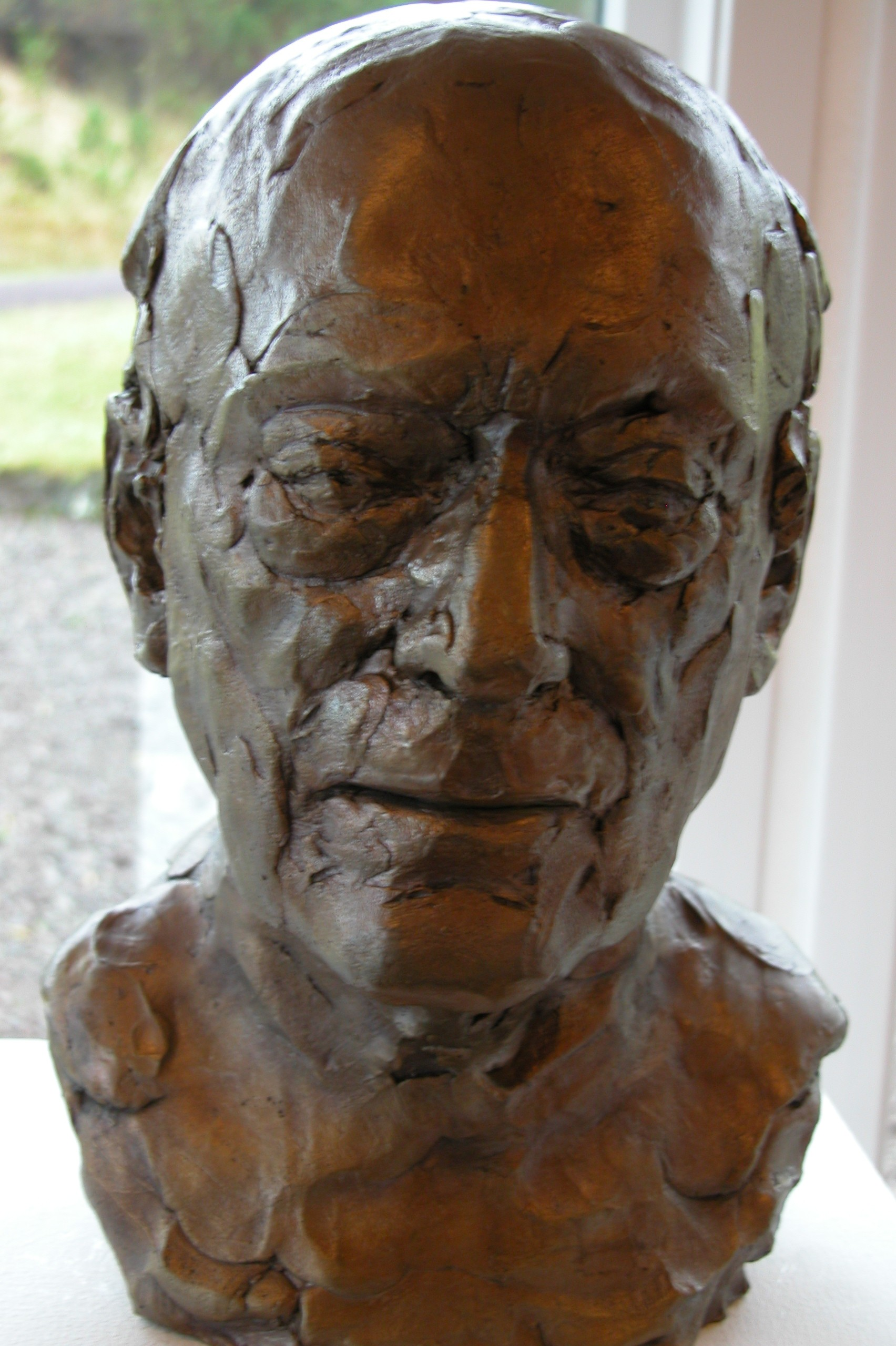
Janus Kamban, (Hans Pauli Olsen)

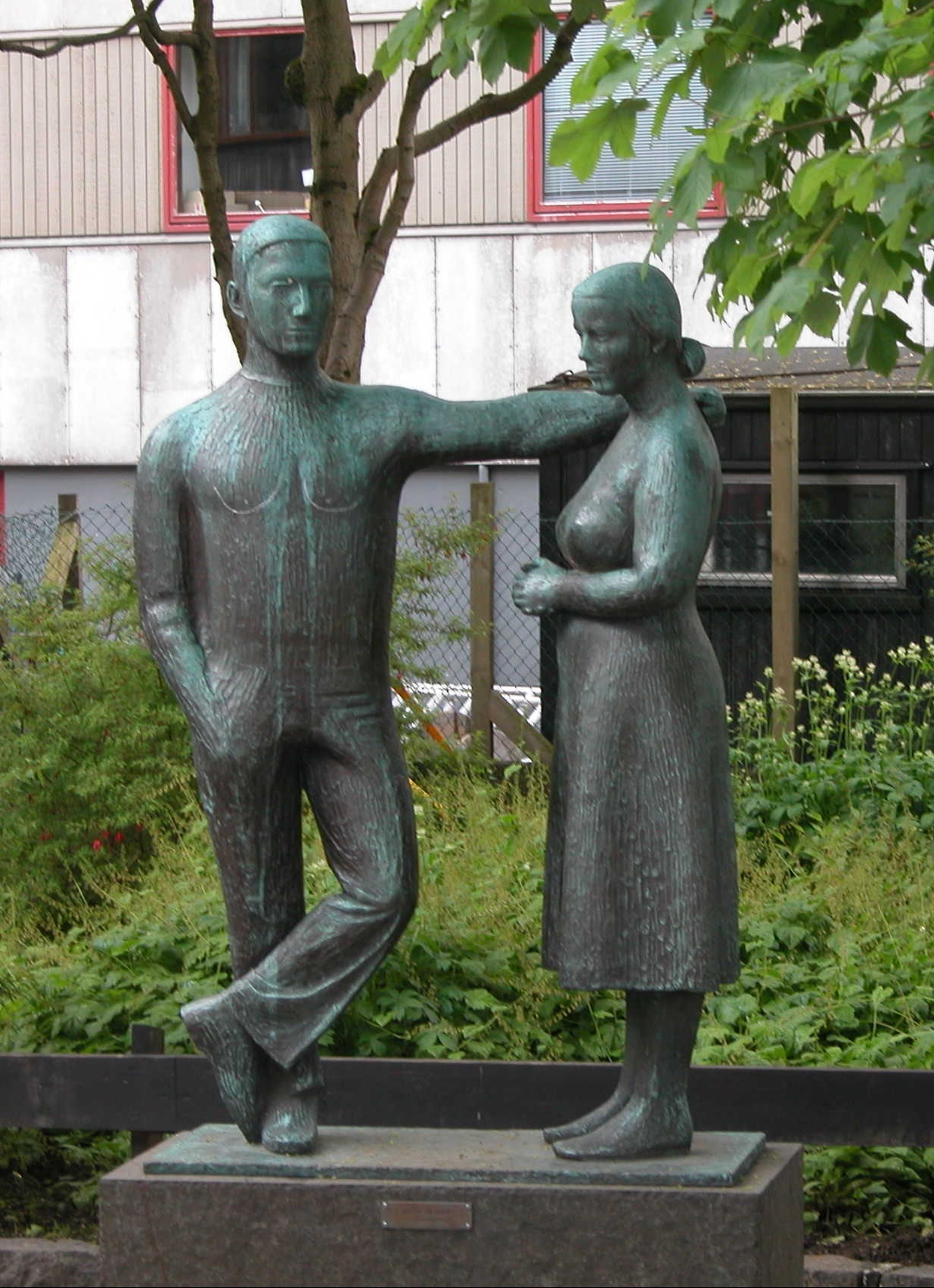
Sculpture Man and Woman (1971) by Janus Kamban in Tórshavn, Faroe Islands

Janus Kamban (10 September 1913 in Tórshavn – 2 May 2009) was a Faroese sculptor and last living representative from the "first generation" of professional artists in the Faroe Islands.

Kamban is the first and most important sculptor in the Faroe Islands. In 1930 he went to Copenhagen to the Royal Danish Academy of Fine Arts to study painting, but soon changed his direction and attended the School of Sculpture in the Art Academy from 1932 to 1935 and from 1938 to 1940, where he studied under Professor Einar Utzon-Frank. Study tours in the 1930s led him to Paris, Florence, Oslo and Stockholm.

In his Copenhagen studio he organized the first exhibition of Faroese Art in Denmark. In addition to his own works, it included works by Gudmund Hentze, Sámal Joensen-Mikines, Elin Borg Lützen, Ruth Smith and Ingolf Jacobsen.

During the Second World War he had to remain in German-occupied Denmark since the Faroe Islands were occupied by Britain. However, in August 1945, Kamban returned to the Faroe Islands on the first ship, the Aarhus. Once there, he immediately established himself as a sculptor.

His first monumental work was Móðurmálið (mother tongue), made in 1948 from local basalt, as an anniversary memorial for V U Hammershaimb, 1846, creator of the Faroese written language. For some time, the sculpture was hidden behind tall bushes but has once again been made visible and can be seen close to the Faroese National Library.

However, the bronze bust for the politician and lawyer Niels Winther (1822–92) is clearly visible at the entrance to the national library, and the 3.8 × 2.9 metre cement relief Søgumaðurin (the storyteller) of 1956 can be seen on the facade of a local school in Tórshavn. Other monuments produced by him can be found all over the Faroe Islands, and his subjects are common everyday practical aspects of island life: seamen, islanders, sheep, pilot whales, the Faroese chain dance and so on. He used plaster, cement, baked clay, wood, basalt and bronze. Two of his sculptures, Sheep with two lambs (cement, 1955) and Four whales (1986), are exhibited at the Faroese Art Museum.

In addition to his sculptures, he also produced graphics, particularly linocuts, including numerous book illustrations, posters, logos and even three postage stamps.

Janus Kamban was one of the founders of the faroese republican party (Tjóðveldi). He advocated for the secession of the Faroe Islands from Denmark, and the establishment of an independent republic. Being an advocate for self-reliance, self-sufficiency and the development of faroese culture, he also co-founded the faroese artists association Listafelagið.

Since 1970 he has lived in a house on the coast (Yviri við Strond in Tórshavn) with a view to Nólsoy, built according to his specifications in the classical style, with black asphalt outside walls and grass roof. At the age of 85, he fell off his bicycle and broke his right hand and it has not healed properly, putting an end to his career as an artist.

== Exhibitions ==
- 1935 Skulpturudstilling, Charlottenburg
- 1941 Skulpturudstilling, Haveselskabets Garden, Frederiksberg
- 1943 Utzon-Frank and his students, Charlottenburg. 1943–45 Koloristerne
- 1948 Ólavsøkuframsýningin, Tórshavn, 1951–52, 1954–56, 1959–63, 1966–70, 1972–73, 1975–76, 1978, 1980–93
- 1970 Faroese Art, Bergens Kunstforening
- 1971 Art from the Faroes, Pier Art Gallery, Orkney
- 1976 Faroese Art, the free exhibition, Copenhagen
- 1983 Grafiska Sællskapet, Malmö. Føroysk List, the Nordic Kunstcentrum, Helsingfors
- 1986 Faroese Art, Nikolaj Kirke Kbh.
- 1992 Várframsýningin, Tórshavn
