= Dímun =

- village
- Location in the Faroe Islands
- Coordinates: 61°41′N 6°45′W
- State: Kingdom of Denmark
- Constituent country: Faroe Islands
- Island: Stora Dimun
- Time zone: GMT
  - Summer (DST): UTC+1 (EST)
- Postal code: FO 286
- Climate: Cfc

Dímun is a village in Stóra Dímun, Faroe Islands. the village is populated by 7 people.
