= Hanni Bjartalíð =

Faroese painter

Hanni Julius Bjartalíð (born 1968) is a Faroese painter.

Born in Klaksvík, he attended art school in Kokkola in Finland. He has held exhibitions in the Faroe Islands, Denmark, Finland, Germany and has featured in Biennial shows in the United Kingdom. He is currently living in Helsinki, Finland.

Originally a painter he has been compared to the Italian Arte Povera artists by using found materials close at hand. Bjartalíð recycles his canvases to such an extent that they are almost always heavy with paint, even the small paintings. The majority of his work now takes the form of 3d sculptures created from found materials. Just as with his paintings Bjartalíð recycles his sculptural objects often reusing parts from works shown in exhibitions to create new, larger works.

In 2008 he won the Faroese award Barnamentanarheiðursløn Tórshavnar býráðs which means Children's Cultural Prize of Tórshavn City Council.

His largest work to date was featured in the 2012 Liverpool Biennial as part of the North Atlantic Pavilion in the City States gallery.

== See also ==
- Art of the Faroe Islands
