= Zacharias Heinesen =

Faroese painter (born 1936)

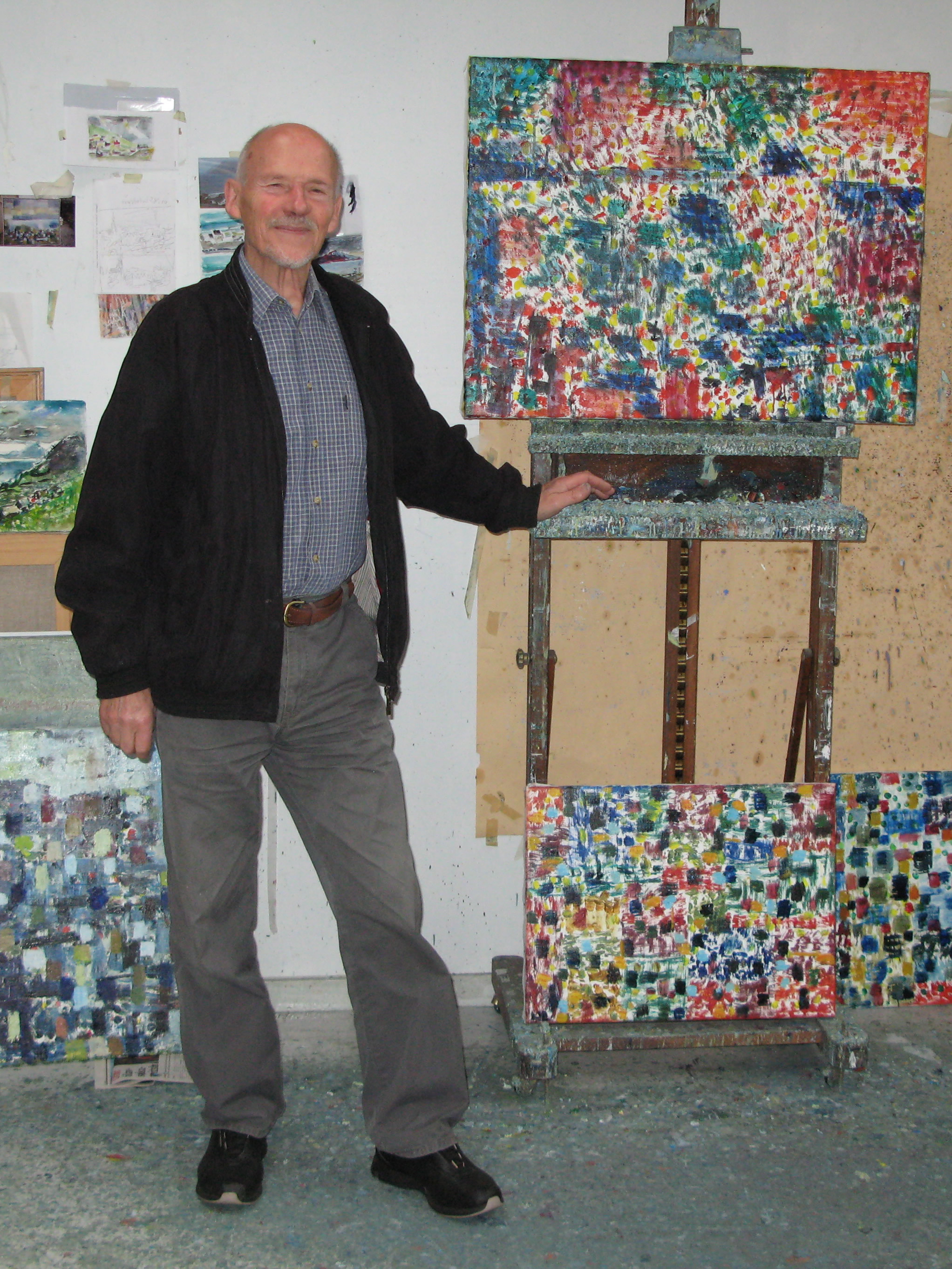
Zacharias Heinesen

Zacharias Heinesen (born 1936 in Tórshavn) is a Faroese painter. He is the son of the writer and artist William Heinesen.

He attended Myndlistaskóli Íslands in Reykjavik between 1957 and 1958. From 1959 to 1963 he attended the Royal Danish Academy of Art in Copenhagen. In 1962, he returned to Tórshavn and established a hilltop studio overlooking the city and harbour. His works include oil paintings, watercolour paintings, drawings, woodcuts, lithographs and paper collages.

Through the years he has held a number of exhibitions and his paintings are to be found in several museums, including his 1987 painting Vár depicting a Faroese village in spring, which can be seen in the Listasavn Føroya (National Art Gallery) in Torshavn. In 1986 he was awarded the Henry Heerup prize.

His paintings were featured on a series of stamps in June 2001:

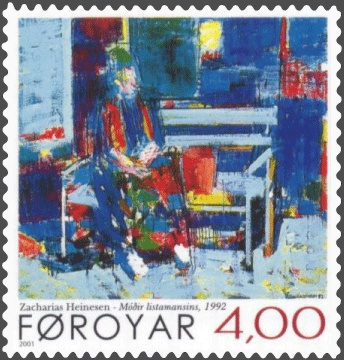
The artist's mother

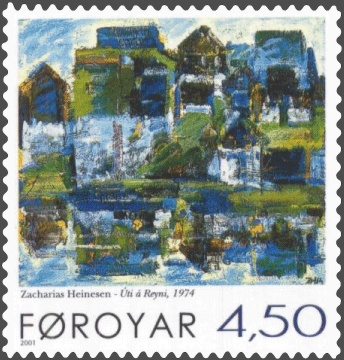
Úti á Reyni

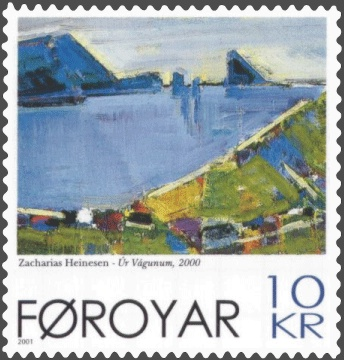
View from Vágar over to Tindhólmur

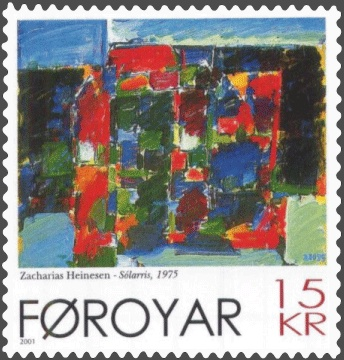
Sunrise

His work can also be seen on the 200 Faroese kronur bank note issues in 2004. In 2006 he was honoured with the Faroese Cultural Prize.

== See also ==
- Faroese art
