= Elinborg Lützen =

Faroese graphic designer

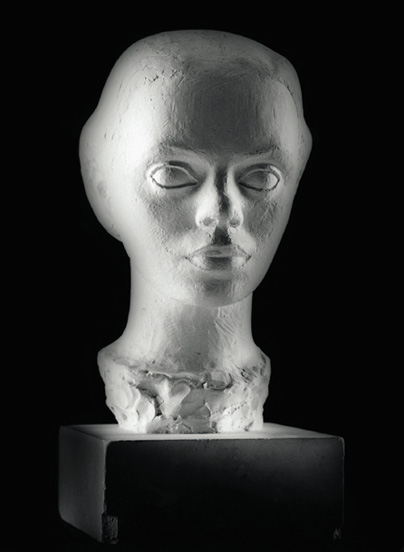
- Bust by Janus Kamban (1913) from 1937 as she was an 18 year old student.
- Born: 26 July 1919; Klaksvík, Faroe Islands
- Died: 22 November 1995 (aged 76); Tórshavn, Faroe Islands
- Known for: Printmaking

Elinborg Lützen (26 July 1919 – 22 November 1995) was a Faroese graphic designer.

== Biography ==
Born in Klaksvik, Faroe Islands, Lützen trained at the Design School for Women (Tegne- og Kunstindustriskolen for Kvinder) in Copenhagen and studied under the graphic artist Povl Christensen.

Lützen was best known for her black and white woodcut and linocut prints in which she portrayed Faroese nature and magical motifs. She showed her work at group exhibitions in Copenhagen, Reykjavík and Bergen and in 1980 participated in a traveling exhibition of Faroese artists presented in Denmark, Norway, Iceland, Scotland, and Finland. She also illustrated Faroese fairy tales and created designs for several stamps.

Lützen was married to, and later divorced, the Faroese painter Sámal Joensen-Mikines. She died in Tórshavn in 1995.

Several of Lützen's pieces are held by the Listasavn Føroya and the Vejle Museum of Art.

== Work ==
Lützen created several designs for Faroese stamps based on fairy tales.

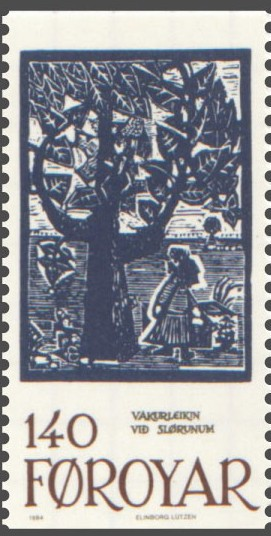
"The Beauty With the Veils"

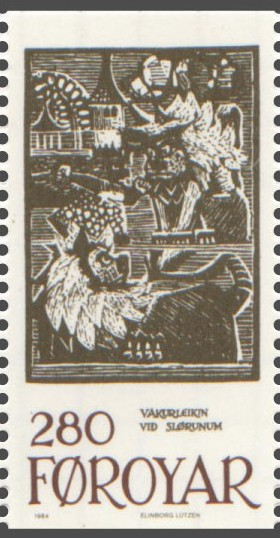
"The Beauty With the Veils"

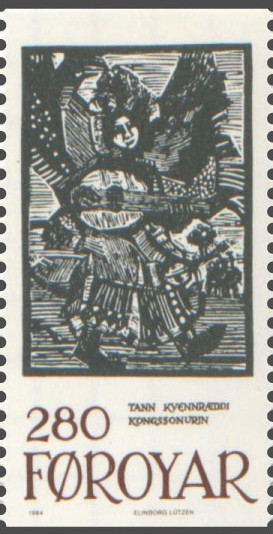
"The Prince Who Was Afraid of Girls".

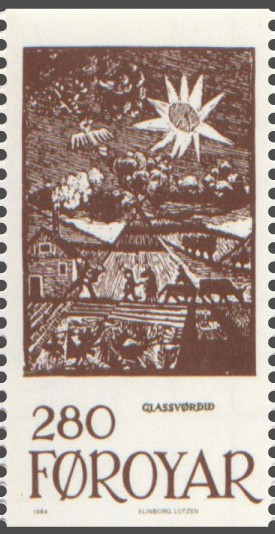
"The Glass Sword"

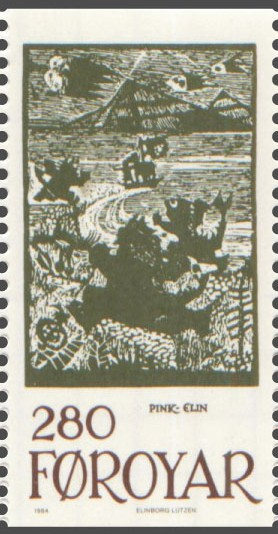
"Tiny Elin"

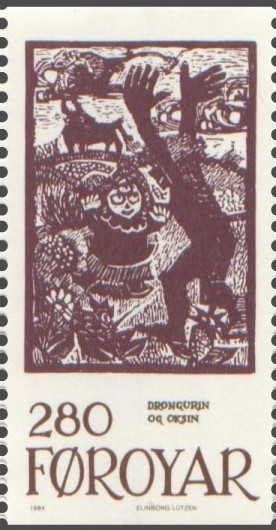
"The Boy and the Ox"
