= Hans Pauli Olsen =

Faroese sculptor

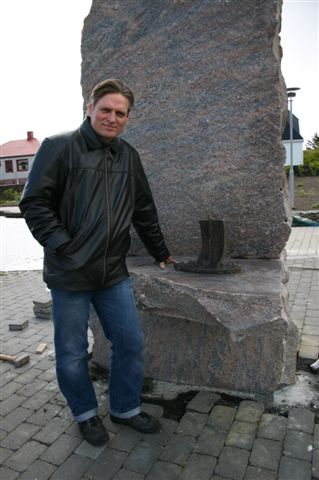
Hans Pauli Olsen, 2006

Hans Pauli Olsen (born August 24, 1957 in Tórshavn, Faroe Islands) is a Faroese sculptor currently living in Denmark. He is one of the most popular artists in the Faroes. His work is found not only in art galleries but also in many towns in the Faroes, especially in the Faroese capital, Tórshavn. His work was featured on two Faroese stamps issued by Postverk Føroya in April 1993 and he was the subject of a 2008 documentary film, No One Can Achieve Perfection.

== Gallery ==
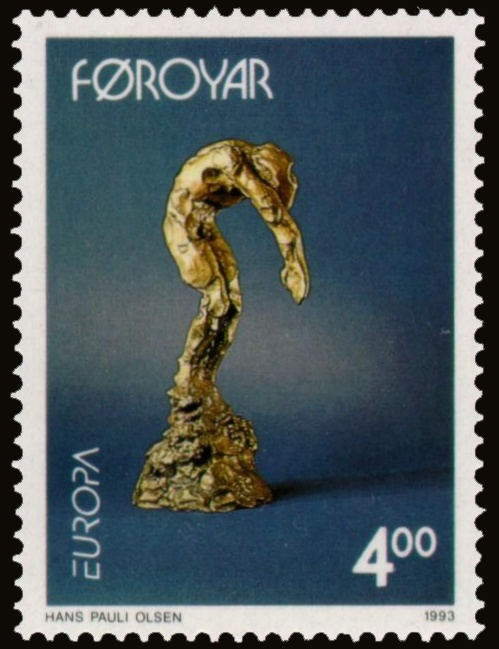
FR 238: Rørsla - Movement.

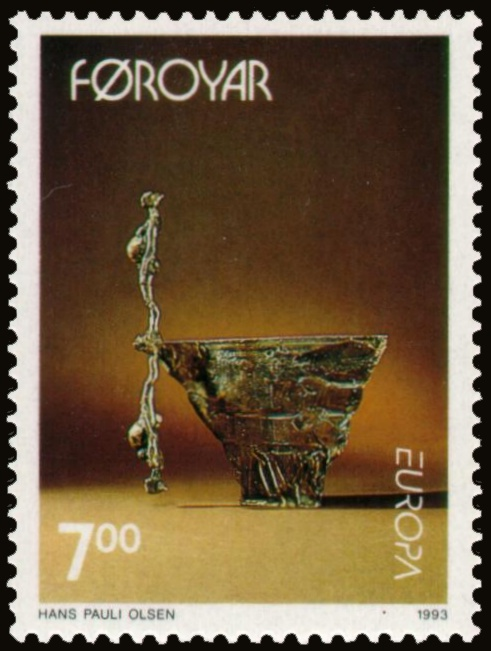
FR 239: Spegling - Reflection.

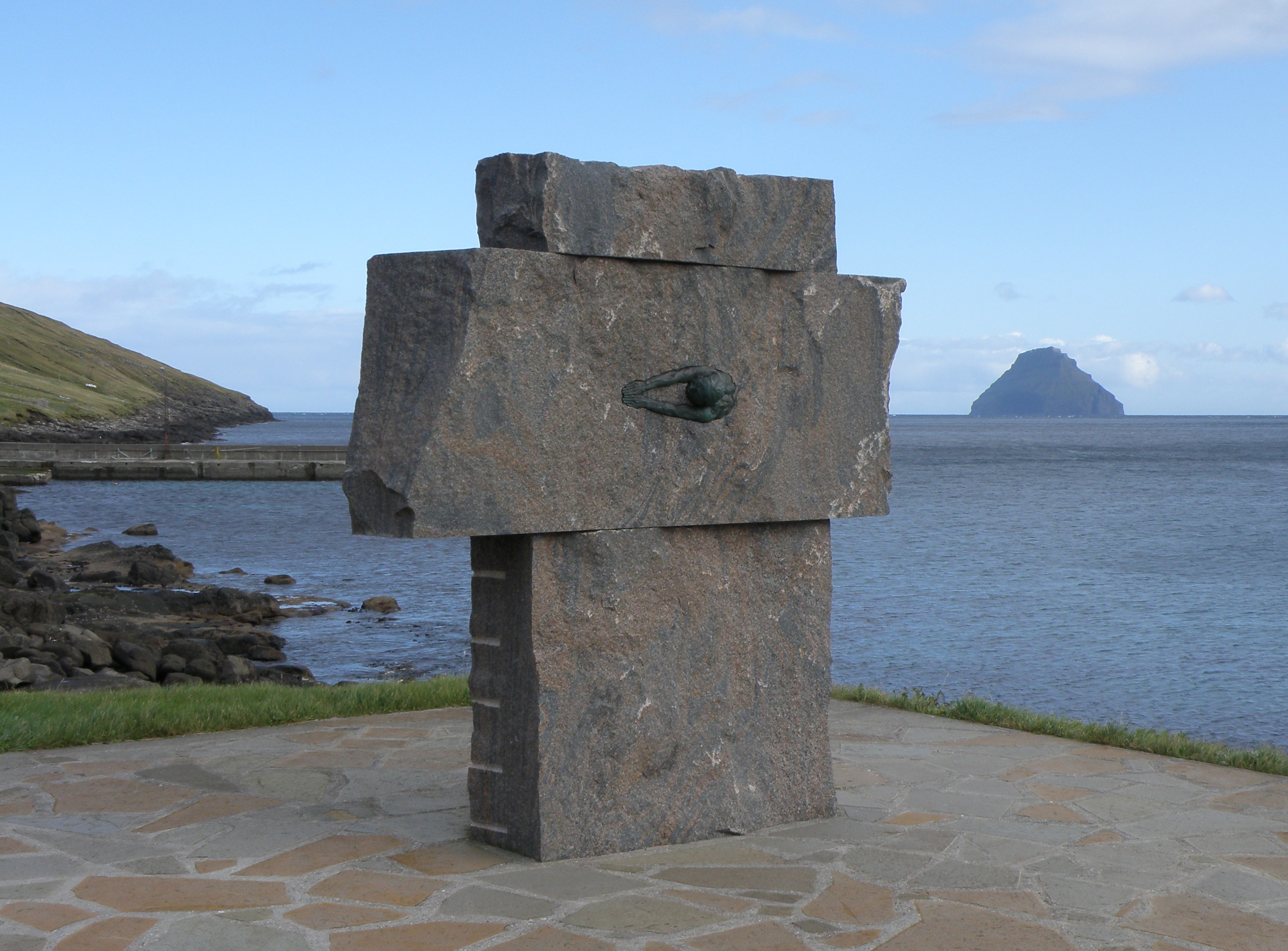
Sigmundur Brestisson - Hin seinasta ferðin, 2006. Monument in Sandvík in memory of Sigmundur Brestisson.
