= Ministry of Education, Research and Culture (Faroe Islands) =

Government ministry of the Faroe Islands

- Mentamálaráðið

Agency overview
- Type: Ministry
- Jurisdiction: Faroe Islands
- Headquarters: Hoyvíksvegur 72, FO-110, Tórshavn, Faroe Islands
- Agency executive: Rigmor Dam, Minister
- Website: www.mmr.fo

Ministry of Education, Research and Culture (Faroese: Mentamálaráðið) in the Faroe Islands is responsible for education, research and culture in the Faroe Islands. The Ministry is also responsible for the pedagogical part of the day care, the ecclesiastical affairs and other, the Radio and TV broadcasting and sports.

== History ==
The ministry of Culture was established in 1963 as the Ministry of Municipalities, Culture and Schools (Faroese: Kommunu-, menta- og skúlamálaráð) and has been a ministry with different names since then, except for 1979–81, when culture was not mentioned in any of the names of the minsteries.

The current minister is Jenis av Rana from the Centre party. The current Permanent Secretary is Poul Geert Hansen.

== Location ==
The Ministry of Education, Research and Culture is located in Tórshavn on Hoyvíksvegur 72.

== Institutions ==
- Altjóða Skrivstovan
- Fólkakirkjan
- University of the Faroe Islands
- Kringvarp Føroya
- Listasavn Føroya
- Mentanargrunnur Landsins
- Granskingarráðið
- Nordic House in the Faroe Islands
- Søvn Landsins
  - Føroya Fornminnissavn
  - Føroya Landsbókasavn
  - Føroya Landsskjalasavn
  - Føroya Náttúrugripasavn
- Tjóðpallur Føroya
- Fólkaskúlin
- Frítíðarundirvísingin (Evening school)
- Føroya Fólkaháskúli
- Føroya Musikkskúli
- Húsarhaldsskúlin
- Sernámsfrøðiligt virksemi (schools and institutions for handicapped children)
- Nám
- Fiskivinnuskúlin
- Føroya Brandskúli
- Handilsskúlar (Business schools)
- Heilsuskúli Føroya
- Vinnuháskúlin
- Sjónám
- Føroya Studentaskúli og HF-Skeið
- Technical schools
- Yrkisdepilin (Responsible for the vocational educations)
- Studni

== See also ==
- Education in the Faroe Islands
- List of cultural ministers of the Faroe Islands
