= Education in the Faroe Islands =

Ministry of Education, Research and Culture
- Minister: Rigmor Dam

National education budget (2012)
- Budget: 1.1 billion DKK(public); 8.1% of GDP

General details
- Primary languages: Faroese, Danish

Literacy
- Total: N/A, note – probably 99%, the same as Denmark proper

Attainment (2011)
- Secondary diploma: 69.9% ^{1}
- Post-secondary diploma: 32.5% ^{1}
- ^{1} Of the population aged 25, and above.

The levels of education in the Faroe Islands are primary, secondary and higher education. Most institutions are funded by the state; there are few private schools in the country. Education is compulsory for 9 years between the ages of 7 and 16.

In the twelfth century education in the Faroe Islands was provided by the Catholic Church. The Church of Denmark took over education after the Protestant Reformation. Modern educational institutions started operating in the last quarter of the nineteenth century and developed throughout the twentieth century. The status of the Faroese language in education was a significant issue for decades, until it was accepted as a language of instruction in 1938. Initially education was administered and regulated by Denmark. In 1979 responsibilities on educational issues started transferring to the Faroese authorities, a procedure which was completed in 2002.

Compulsory education consists of seven years of primary education, and two years of lower secondary education; it is public, free of charge, provided by the respective municipalities, and is called the Fólkaskúli in Faroese. The Fólkaskúli also provides optional preschool education as well as the tenth year of education that is a prerequisite to get admitted to upper secondary education. Students that complete compulsory education are allowed to continue education in a vocational school, where they can have job-specific training and education. Since fishing industry is an important part of country's economy, maritime schools are an important part of Faroese education. Upon completion of the tenth year of Fólkaskúli, students can continue to upper secondary education which consists of several different types of schools. Higher education is offered at the University of the Faroe Islands; a part of Faroese youth moves abroad to pursue higher education, mainly in Denmark. Other forms of education comprise adult education and music schools. The structure of the Faroese educational system bears resemblances with its Danish counterpart.

The main language of instruction up to the lower secondary school is Faroese, while Danish is the main language of instruction in upper secondary schools. Education in the Faroe Islands is administered and regulated by the Ministry of Education, Research and Culture (Faroese: Mentamálaráðið), with Rigmor Dam being the minister since 15 September 2015.

== Background ==
The Ministry of Education, Research and Culture has the jurisdiction of educational responsibility in the Faroe Islands. Since the Faroe Islands is a constituent country of the Danish Realm, education in the Faroe Islands is influenced and has similarities with the Danish educational system; there is an agreement on educational cooperation between the Faroe Islands and Denmark. In 2012 the public spending on education was 8.1% of GDP. The municipalities are responsible for the school buildings for children's education in Fólkaskúlin from age 1st grade to 9th or 10th grade (age 7 to 16). In November 2013 1,615 people, or 6.8% of the total number of employees, were employed in the education sector. Of the 31,270 people aged 25 and above 1,717 (5.5%) have gained at least a Master's degree or a Ph.D., 8,428 (27%) have gained a B.Sc. or a Diploma, 11,706 (37.4%) have finished upper secondary education while 9,419 (30.1%) has only finished primary school and have no other education. There is no data on literacy in the Faroe Islands, but the CIA Factbook states that it is probably as high as in Denmark proper, i.e. 99%.

The majority of students in upper secondary schools are women, although men represent the majority in higher education institutions. In addition, most young Faroese people who relocate to other countries to study are women. Out of 8,535 holders of bachelor degrees, 4,796 (56.2%) have had their education in the Faroe Islands, 2,724 (31.9%) in Denmark, 543 in both the Faroe Islands and Denmark, 94 (1.1%) in Norway 80 in the United Kingdom and the rest in other countries. Out of 1,719 holders of master's degrees or PhDs, 1,249 (72.7% have had their education in Denmark, 87 (5.1%) in the United Kingdom, 86 (5%) in both the Faroe Islands and Denmark, 64 (3.7%) in the Faroe Islands, 60 (3.5%) in Norway and the rest in other countries (mostly EU and Nordic). Since there is no medical school in the Faroe Islands, all medical students have to study abroad; as of 2013, out of a total of 96 medical students, 76 studied in Denmark, 19 in Poland and 1 in Hungary.

=== Language ===
Although the Faroese language is designated as the country's principal language, the Home Rule Act of the Faroe Islands states that the Danish language "is to be learnt well and carefully". Up to ninth grade, most school material is in Faroese; there are Danish classes since third grade. In upper secondary education this pattern is reversed; courses are taught in Danish, except the Faroese language courses. The Faroese language is taught 64 hours per week, overall, throughout compulsory education, while Danish is taught 29 hours per week; exams in both languages are equal in length. English language courses start from 4th grade and they are taught for 60 hours annually at that grade, 90 hours in 5th grade, 120 hours in 6th, 7th, 8th and 9th grade; pupils who chose to take the 10th grade have the option to get another 120 hours of English lessons.

Faroese and Danish language courses in Fólkaskúlin
Grade	Faroese (hours of instruction per week)	Danish (hours of instruction per week)
1st Grade	11	–
2nd Grade	11	–
3rd Grade	9	3
4th Grade	6	4
5th Grade	6	4
6th Grade	6	4
7th Grade	5	4
8th Grade	5	4
9th Grade	5	4
Fólkaskúlin	64	29

== History ==
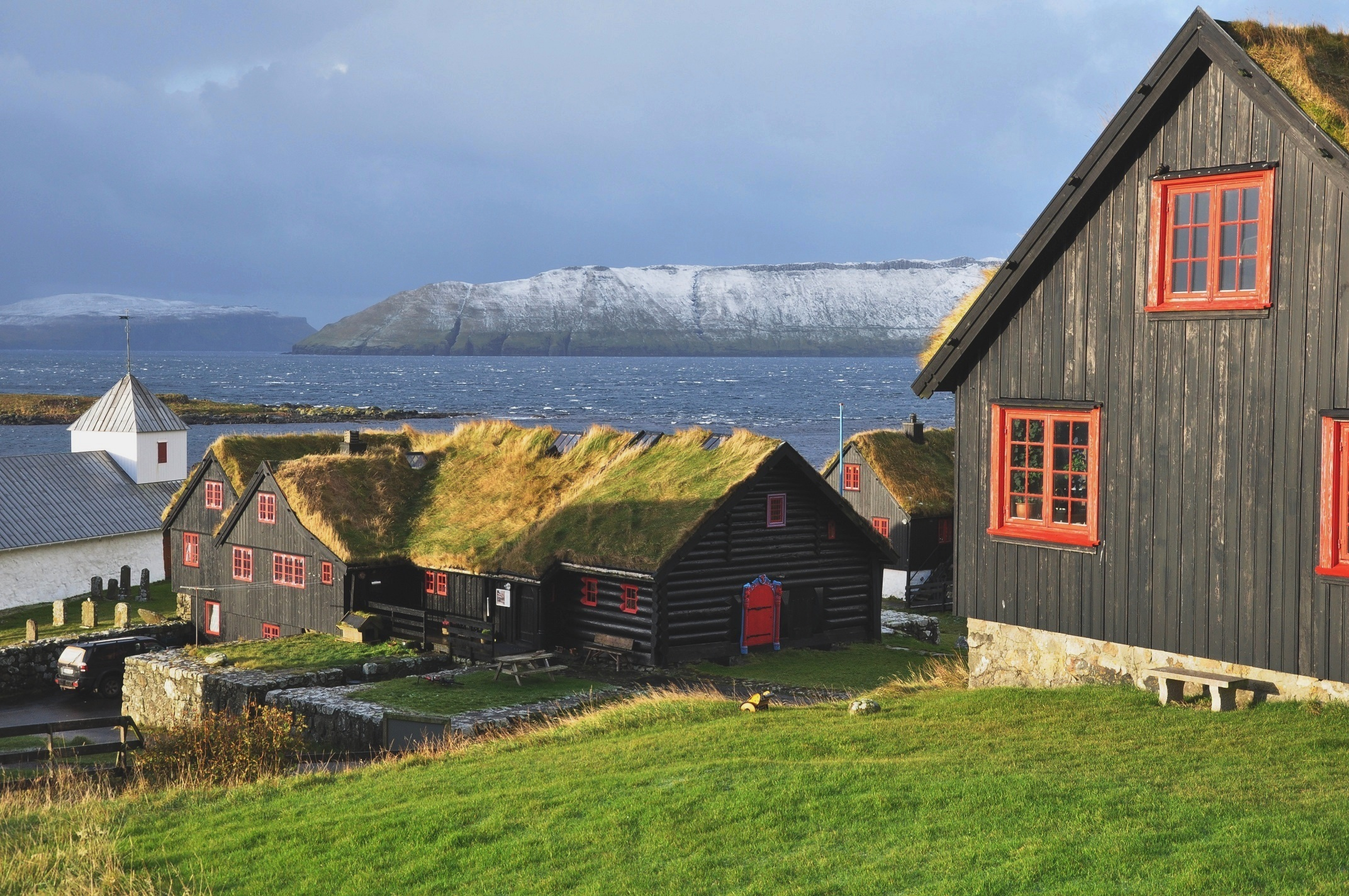
In the Middle Ages education was offered by the Catholic Church in Kirkjubøur.

In the Middle Ages there was education in Kirkjubøur offered by the Catholic Church. According to the Sverris saga, Sverre of Norway received schooling by Roe the bishop of Faroe Islands; later speeches of his, show that he was taught Latin, a feature revealed by his knowledge of the Decretum Gratiani. The school in Kirkjubøur continued until the Protestant Reformation. After the reformation Latin Schools were established in the Danish kingdom, extending over today's Denmark, Iceland, Greenland, Faroe Islands, Skåneland and Gotland in Sweden, and Øsel (now Saaremaa) in Estonia. The Latin School in the Faroe Islands is first mentioned in 1547, in a letter to Thomas Koppen who got the Faroe Islands as a fief.

In 1870 the Faroese Teachers School (Faroese: Føroya Læraraskúli) was established to offer training and qualification for teachers. The first maritime schools were founded as private institutions in Tórshavn in 1893. The first Evening School was founded in 1904, with joint financing by the Løgting and Denmark. In 1912 a Danish Royal decree established compulsory primary education, with the provision that teaching was in Danish. That decision led to tensions in education as Faroese teachers Louis Zachariasen and Jákup Dahl continued teaching in Faroese and were persecuted for doing so; the issue was resolved in 1938 when Faroese was recognized as equal to Danish in Faroese schools. In 1927 the Danish government, upon the request of the Faroese parliament, established a public navigational school in Tórshavn, followed by a marine engineers school in 1929.

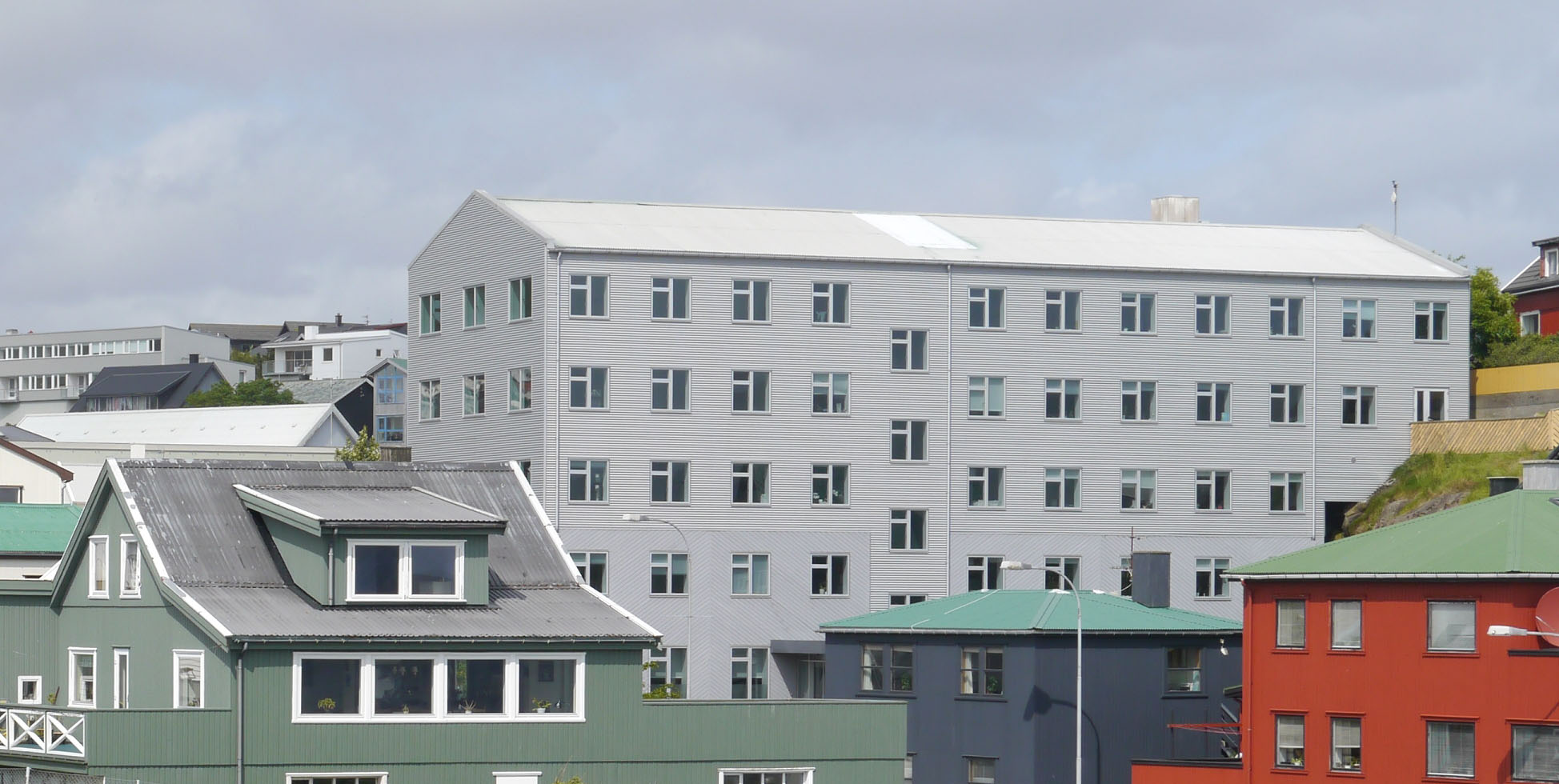
The Faroese Nursing School, established in 1960, was merged into the University of the Faroe Islands in 2008 and was renamed the Department of Nursing.

The Faroese Nursing School was established in 1960 by the Ministry of Health and Social Affairs; it traces its roots back in 1910 when nurses were trained in the hospital of Tórshavn. The University of the Faroe Islands, was established in 1965; Klaus H. Jacobsen, a Dane, was appointed as the first lecturer in 1970 to teach courses for the examen philosophicum, a prerequisite at the time to pursue higher education in Denmark. After Denmark abandoned the examen philosophicum in 1971, on the initiative of Jacobsen and Kjartan Hoydal the university accepted its first full-time science students in the autumn of 1972. Education in the Faroe Islands was administered by Denmark under the Home Rule Act, until in the late 1990s its administration was transferred to the Faroese government as a matter of local interest.

In 1979 responsibility on educational matters started transferring from Denmark to the Faroese authorities, with the Faroese government getting full economic responsibility of education in 1988. By 1996 education became the responsibility of the Faroese government; this procedure was completed in 2002, preceded by the establishment of the Ministry of Education, Research and Culture. The administration of the Nursing School was passed to the Ministry of Education, Research and Culture in 2000 and the degree was recognized as a bachelor's degree in 2003. In 2005 the marine schools of navigation and engineering merged to form the Centre of Maritime Studies and Engineering. On 1 August 2008 the Faroese School of Education and the Faroese School of Nursing where incorporated into the university becoming its departments.

== Structure ==
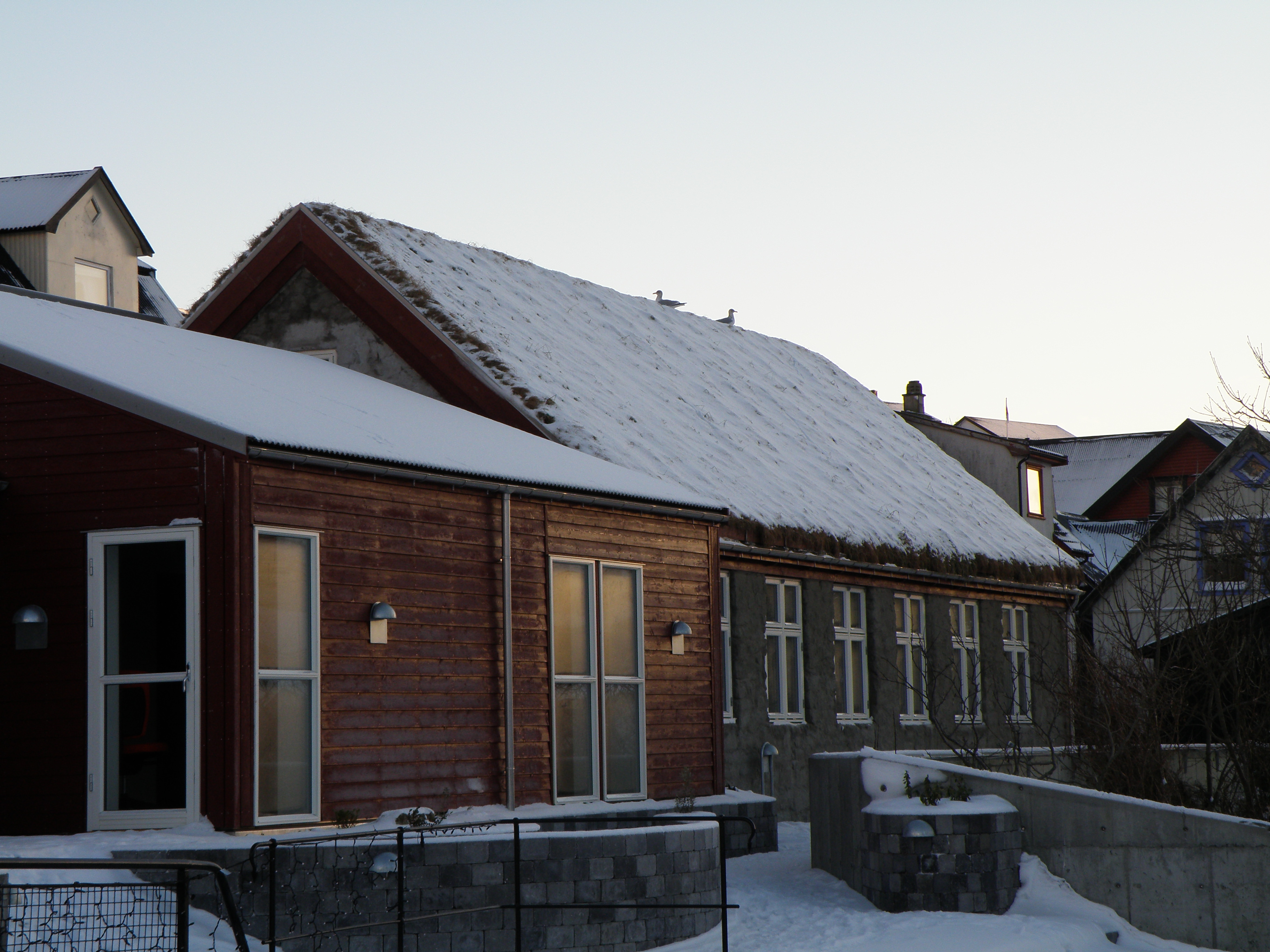
Schools in the villages around the islands were not common until late 19th century. This is the first school in Sørvágur, built from 1885 to 1887 (the stone building). Now it houses the Music School of Vágar island.

=== Primary and lower secondary education ===
Compulsory education in the Faroe Islands is provided for nine years from the age of 7 to 16. Primary education in the Faroe Islands commences at the beginning of the school year in the calendar year in which the child has reached the age of seven years. It is part of the compulsory education, and it lasts at least seven years, Primary education is provided by 51 Fólkaskúli and 3 Free Schools; some of these Fólkaskúli also provide optional preschool education. In 2014 there were 5,205 students attending primary education in the Faroe Islands.

Upon completion of the first seven years of primary education, students can continue their studies in lower secondary education in the 8th and 9th grade and if they wish to, they can also take the 10th year of Fólkaskúli. Two thirds of the pupils from the 9th grade chose to take the 10th grade of Fólkaskúlin also. Lower secondary education lasts two to three years and, as with primary education, it is provided by Fólkaskúli and is free of charge. The first two years are part of the compulsory education, while the third year is optional, though a prerequisite to continue to the upper high school. In 2014 there were 1,932 students in lower secondary education.

The final examination from the Fólkaskúli gives access to upper secondary education like "Studentaskúlin", "Fiskivinnuskúlin" or other similar secondary schools which takes three years or (Higher Preparatory Examination (HF)) which takes two years. It also gives access to the one year FHS Yrkisnám from Føroya Handilsskúli (Faroese business college) or the 3-year secondary education Búskaparbreytin (Economy secondary school) from Føroya Handilsskúli.

=== Upper secondary education ===
Upper secondary education is offered by eight schools that offer five different type of courses. The Studentaskúli is an academically oriented three-year-long school. Upon completion students can apply for admission in higher education institutions. This type of education is offered at three schools: Føroya Studentaskúli og HF-Skeið in Tórshavn, Studentaskúlin og HF-skeiðið í Eysturoy in Kambsdalur and Miðnámsskúlin í Suðuroy in Suðuroy. Another type of upper secondary education is HF, which is a 2-year academically oriented course for adults, that is offered at Føroya Studentaskúli og HF-Skeið and Studentaskúlin og HF-skeiðið í Eysturoy. The Business College (Faroese: Føroya Handilsskúli), also called FHS, offers a three-year curriculum and its completion allows its alumni to continue to higher education. It is also possible to take a one-year education from the Business College. There are two Business Colleges, one in Tórshavn and one Kambsdalur. The Technical college (Faroese: Tekniski skúlin) offers courses on several technical fields along with apprenticeship. It is offered in two schools, one in Tórshavn and one in Klaksvík. Its alumni can pursuit higher education in technical sciences or take higher education courses of the Technical College. The Fisheries College (Faroese: Fiskivinnuskúlin) in Vestmanna. It focuses in the fishing industry and food science and upon its completion students can continue in higher education studies related to the fishing industry.

=== Vocational education ===
==== Maritime education ====
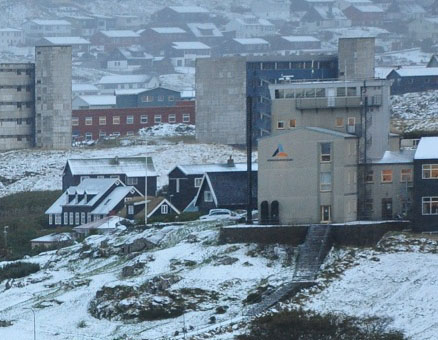
Vinnuháskúlin is located in Tórshavn.

There are two vocational maritime schools in the Faroe Islands: The Centre of Maritime Studies and Engineering (Faroese: Vinnuháskúlin) in Tórshavn and the Sjónam Maritime School (Faroese: Sjónám) in Klaksvík.

Vinnuháskúlin offers three-year studies to become a shipmaster or a marine engineer, in addition to shorter versions of these, while it also offers a one and a half-year studies to become a captain and individual marine courses. In 2010 100% of the graduates for skipper, shipmaster, machinist and marine engineer were men. All graduates from Vinnuháskúlin in June 2015 were men.

Sjónam in Klaksvík offers a 1½ year shipmaster education, which qualifies its alumni to be either First Officer or Captain on merchant ships up to 3000 gross tonnage. In order to get access to the education, the applicants must fulfill the terms according to Ship Master Law (Kunngerð um skiparaútbúgving) number 107 of 20 September 2005, i.e. the applicants must have experience of working on board a ship which is at least 20 gross tonnage for at least 36 months, of which at least 18 months should be from a larger vessel of at least 200 gross tonnage. They should also have finished the nine years of compulsory primary and lower secondary school with at least "passed" results in Faroese, Danish, English, physics, chemistry and math.

Sjónám also offers a shorter maritime education of six months. It is a ship assistant education (Faroese: skipsatstøðingur) which provides the students to be able to perform all kinds of work on deck and in the engine room on board a ship. The applicants must be at least 17 1/2 years old and must have completed the 9 years of Fólkaskúlin. The applicants must also have a health certificate for seamen. This education together with 9 months which are required for becoming an able-bodied seaman, qualifies the alumni for the 1½ year long shipmaster education.

==== Public Health School ====
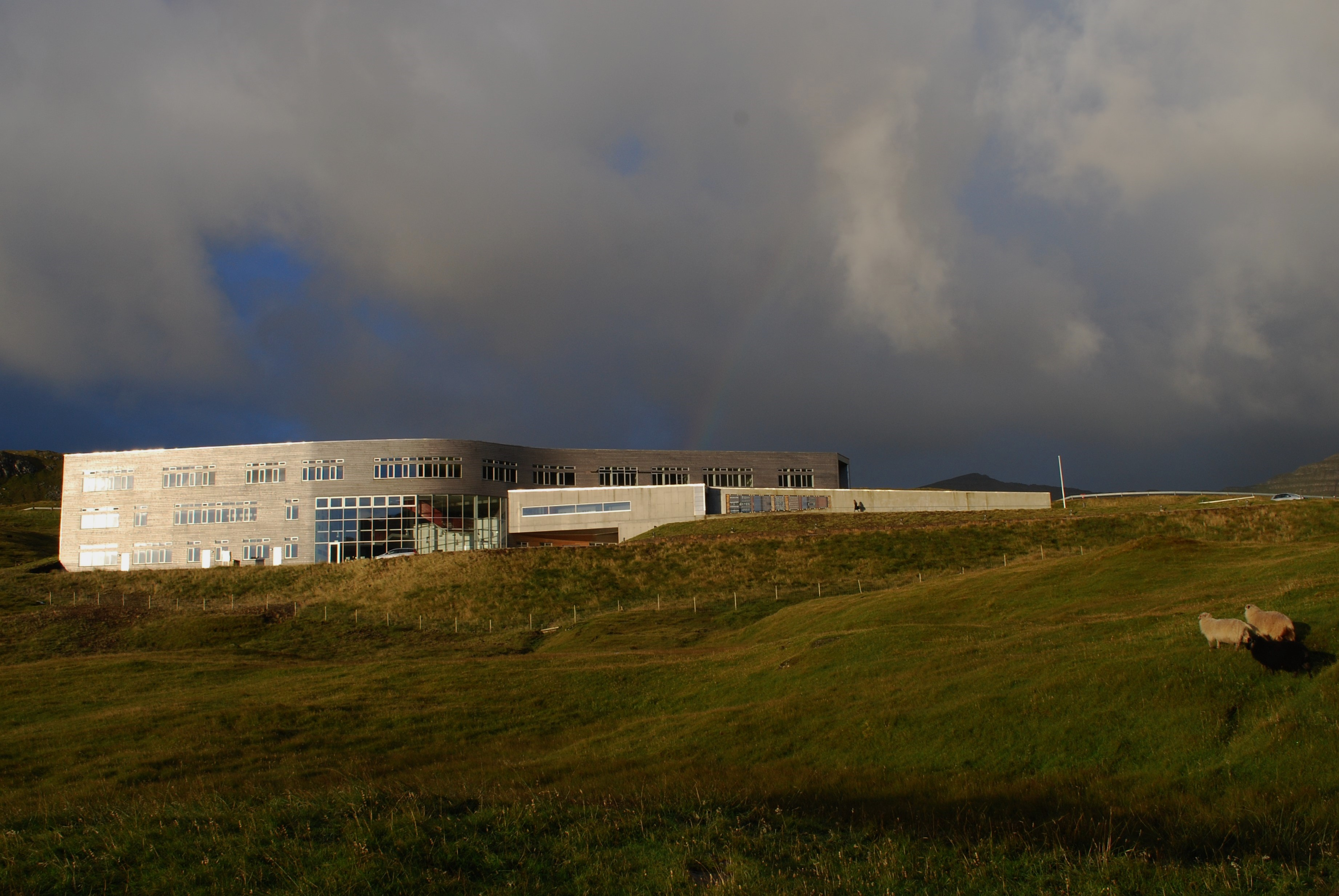
Miðnámsskúlin í Suðuroy. The school building consists of the Suðuroy Gymnasium and the Health School. It is located in Suðuroy in Porkeri, near the village Hov.

The Public Faroese Health School (Faroese: Heilsuskúli Føroya) in Suðuroy is a vocational school offering two types of education. The health care assistant education (Heilsuhjálpari) takes fifteen months. Following graduation, pupils can choose to leave the school and work in home care and retirement homes. Alternatively they can continue with another 22 months and become an assistant nurse (heilsurøktari). The assistant nurse can work in various places, mostly in retirement homes or hospitals. The graduates from the Health School are mainly women. In 2012 almost 90% of the School's graduates were women.

=== Other schools ===
The Faroe Music School (Faroese: Musikkskúlin) runs fourteen institutions around the islands that are responsible for teaching music in the Faroe Islands. The pupils pay between 1,200 and 1,600 DKK each year in order to get lessons, the price depends on which municipality the pupil lives in. In Tórshavn there are classes, called Musikkspælistova, for children up to 6 years costing 600 DKK for a year; it also offers a three-year musical education program in Tórshavn, which is a middle-range training for Faroese people aged 14 to 25, costing 2,400 DKK annually and admitting up to 8 pupils a year.

The Evening School (Faroese: Kvøldskúli or Frítíðarundirvísing), offers a variety of courses for everyone and Faroese language lessons for foreigners. Courses range from handicraft, music lessons, foreign languages to swimming. The courses are offered by the municipalities, with 50% of the teachers' wages paid by them and the rest paid by the Ministry of Culture and Education; the Ministry of Culture pays 100% of the wages in cases of disabled people.

Additionally there are the School of Home Economics (Faroese: Húsarhaldsskúli Føroya) and the Folk High School (Faroese: Føroya Fólkaháskúli) offering half-year courses in food and diet, hygiene, sewing, embroidering and humanities, arts and creative subjects respectively.

=== Higher education ===
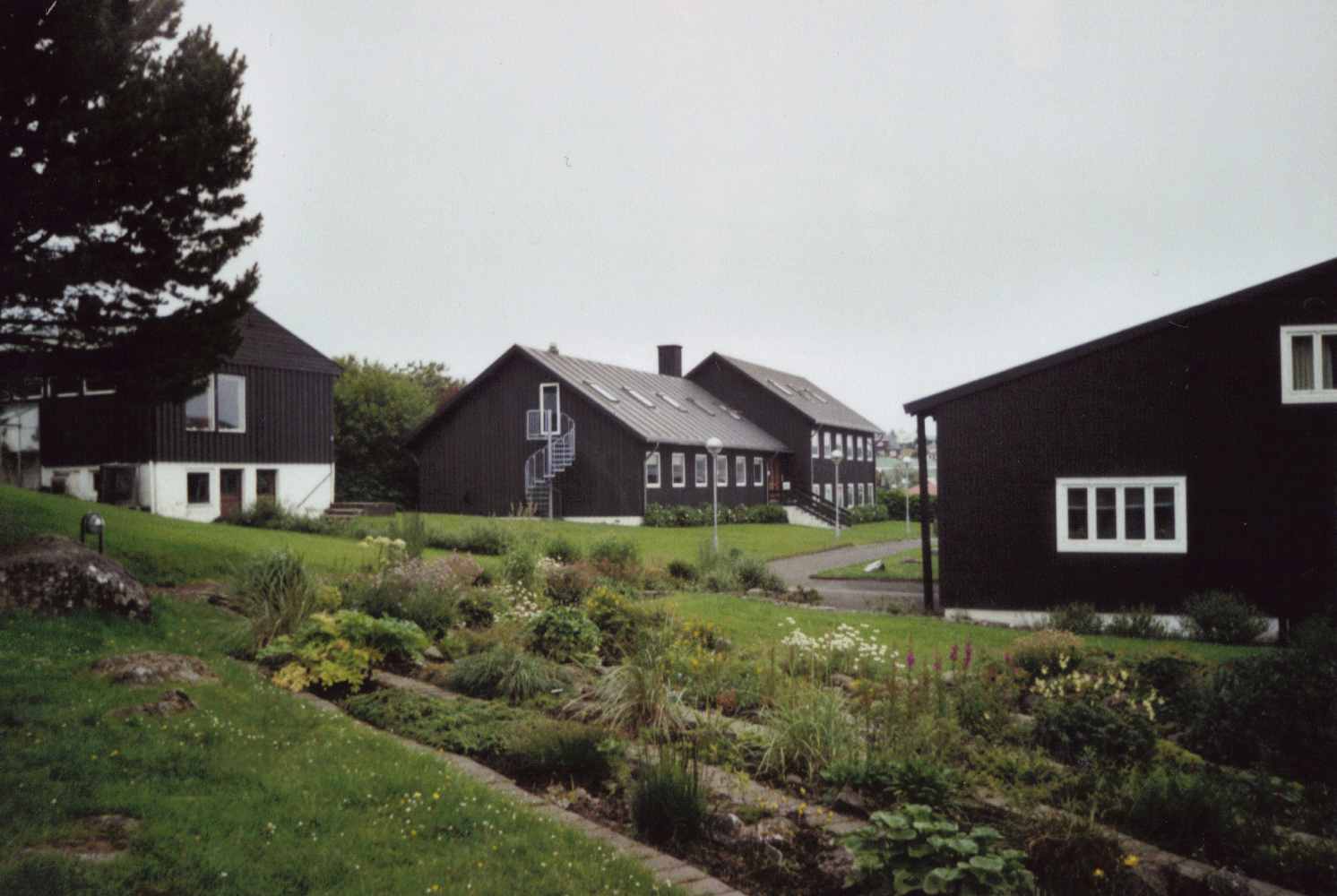
Department of Faroese Language and Literature, University of the Faroe Islands.

Higher education in the Faroe Islands is mainly undertaken by the University of the Faroe Islands, a public research university granting academic degrees. Individual higher education courses are offered by The Business School. Many Faroese pursue higher education out of the islands, mainly in Denmark; in August 2015 a report showed 1,345 Faroese students in Denmark, 904 in the Faroe Islands and 182 in other countries. Studni, the Faroese Student Grant Fund, provides student grants and loans to Faroese students, to study either in the Faroe Islands or abroad.

==== University of the Faroe Islands ====
Higher education is offered by the Tórshavn based, University of the Faroe Islands (Faroese: Fróðskaparsetur Føroya). It was founded in 1965, as Academia Færoensis, by members of the Faroese Academy of Sciences. The university is divided in two faculties: the Faculty of Humanities, Social Sciences and Education and the Faculty of Natural and Health Sciences, offering several B.Sc. degrees, M.Sc. degrees and Ph.D.s. It is publicly funded and in 2010 it received approximately 68 million DKK. Admission requirements include taking the upper secondary school leaving examination. Specific departments could place additional requirements, e.g. in 2015 the Software Engineering department required a grade of 6/13 in mathematics.

==== Higher education from the Business School ====
It is possible to take individual higher education courses in Commerce from the Business School in Kambsdalur and in Tórshavn. The alumni can work at the same time and take one course each semester. After three years they will have achieved 60 ECTS which is the same as the first part of the HD education. They can also take the second part of the HD education from the Business College, and they can also combine it with courses from the Aarhus University via distant education. If they wish to study further for at MBA they must take it from a university in Denmark, i.e. the Aarhus University.

==== Research ====
Research in the Faroe Islands is administered by the Faroese Research Council (Faroese: Granskingarráðið). Each year the Parliament of the Faroe Islands allocates money to the Faroese Research Foundation, and it is the Faroese Research Council that decides its recipients. From 2002 to 2012 the Research Foundation had received over 70 million DKK. Research is conducted by several governmental institutions (i.e. museums, laboratories, hospitals, marine institutes) and the University of the Faroe Islands.

== See also ==
- Christian Matras – Faroese poet and academic
- Faroese language conflict – Political and cultural argument over the official language of the Faroe Islands
- Faroese scientific society
- Føroya Studentaskúli og HF-Skeið
