= Christian Matras =

Christian Matras may refer to:

- Christian Matras (poet) (1900–1988), Faroe Islands poet
- Christian Matras (cinematographer) (1903–1977), French cinematographer
