= Dorete Bloch =

Faroese/Danish biologist

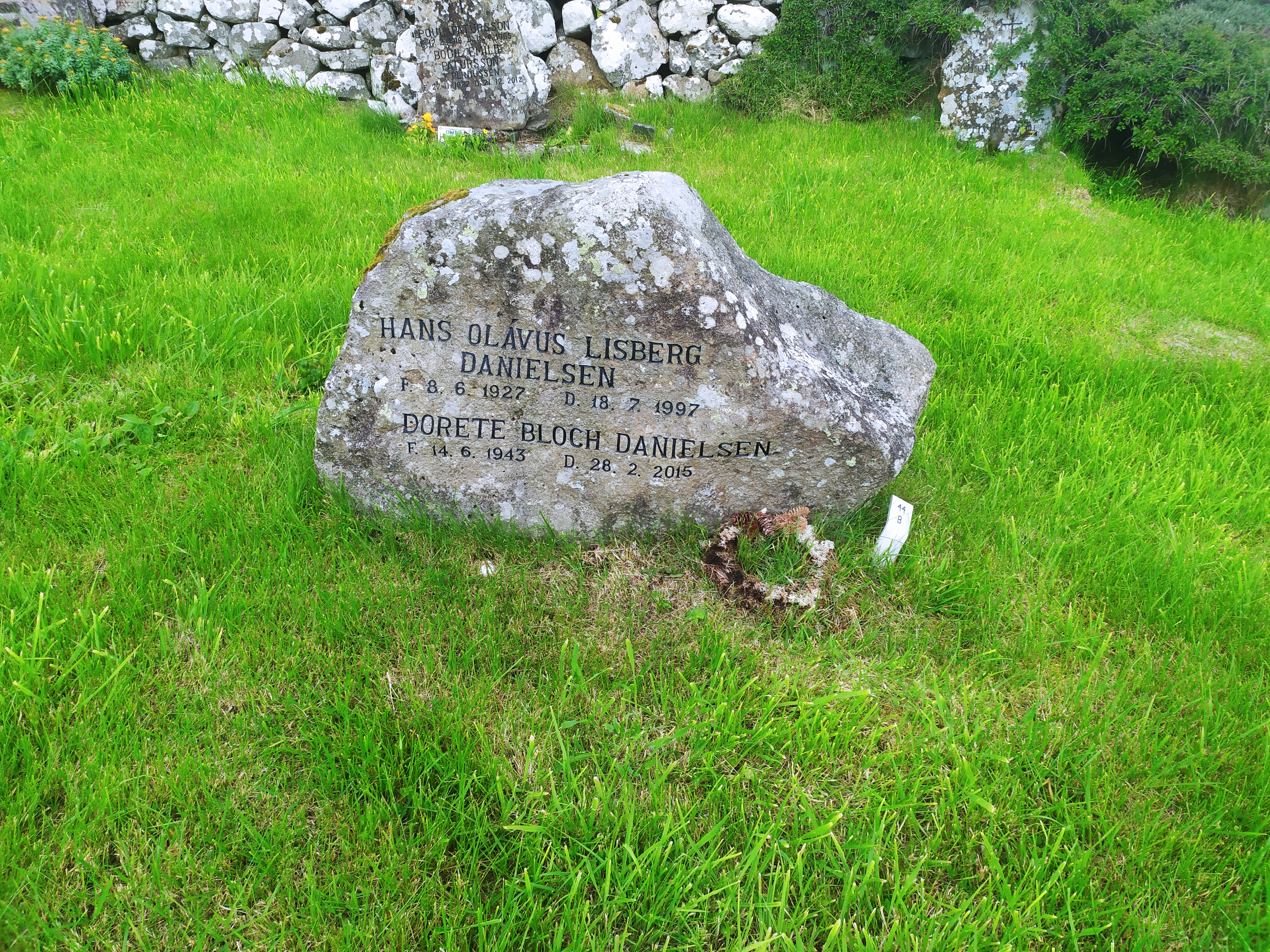
- Tombstone of Bloch and her husband
- Born: 14 June 1943; Rungsted, Hoersholm, Denmark
- Died: 28 February 2015 (aged 71); Tórshavn, Faroe Islands, Denmark
- Education: Aarhus University; University of Lund
- Spouse: Ólávus Danielsen
- Children: Jónas Bloch Danielsen, Jóannis Bloch Danielsen
- Scientific career
- Workplaces: University of the Faroe Islands
- Thesis: Pilot Whales in the North Atlantic: Age, Growth and Social Structure in Faroese Grinds of the Long-Finned Pilot Whale, Globicephala melas (1994)

Dorete Bloch, married name Dorete Bloch Danielsen, (14 June 1943 in Rungsted – 28 February 2015 in Tórshavn) was a Danish zoologist, former director of Náttúrugripasavnið (the Faroes Natural History Museum), editor of Fróðskaparrit and author of numerous books on the animals and plants of the Faroe Islands. Bloch was born in Rungsted but moved to the Faroe Islands in 1974, where she remained for the rest of her life. She published studies on pilot whales, gaining a D.Phil in their study in 1991, covering aspects such as their migration patterns, diving behaviour and their importance on Faroese society.

== Career ==
Dorete Bloch was born in Rungsted and attended Viborg Katedralskole until 1962 and then Aarhus University. After graduating in 1970 with an MSc in zoology, she worked at the university's Wildlife Research Station at Kalø, where she conducted research into hares and mute swans.

On 15 October 1974 she moved to the Faroe Islands, where she settled for the rest of her life. She was appointed a lecturer at the University of the Faroe Islands. In 1980, she was promoted to be the director of the zoology department. She was awarded a D.Phil. by the University of Lund in 1994 for her thesis Pilot Whales in the North Atlantic. Age, Growth and Social Structure in Faroese Grinds of the Long-Finned Pilot Whale, Globicephala melas. In 1995, she was made director of the Faroe Natural History Museum, a position she held until 2009. At the same time, from 2001, she was appointed as a professor of zoology at the University of the Faroe Islands. She was also editor of the journal Fróðskaparrit.

Bloch's research has involved various Faroese animals, including bottlenose whales and mountain hares. Much of her work has been into pilot whales, covering aspects of their behaviour and their impact on Faroese society. Between 2000 and 2004, she was part of a project using tagged long-finned pilot whales to track their movements via satellite.

She has assisted in studies of birds of the islands and was bird consultant for Vágar Airport. Her interests are not restricted to animals. Amongst her publications are also descriptions of the flowers of the Faroe Islands, which was called a "labour of love". Her writing was described as "lively and imaginative.

== Private life ==
Bloch married Ólávus Danielsen (1927–1997). They lived in Velbastaður, in Tórshavn Municipality and had one son, Jónas Bloch Danielsen, a musician who established Studio Bloch on the harbour in Tórshavn, the first recording studio in the islands. Bloch died on 28 February 2015.

== Selected bibliography ==
Bloch wrote extensively on pilot whaling in the Faroes, Her works include:

- Bloch, D. and Zachariassen, M. The Skinn Values of Faroe Island Pilot Whales: An Evaluation and Corrective Proposal. North Atlantic Studies 1, No. 1.
- Bloch, D. 1992. Studies of the long-finned pilot whale in the Faroe Islands, 1976–1986. Fróðskaparrit 38-39: 35–61.
- Bloch, D. 2007. Pilot whales and the whale drive in the Faroes. Tórshavn: H.N. Jacobsens.
- Desportes, G., Andersen, L.W., Aspholm, P.E., Bloch, D. and Mouritsen, R. 1992. A note about a male-only pilot whale school observed in the Faroe Islands. Fróðskaparrit 40: 31–37.
- Desportes, G., Bloch, D., Andersen, L.W. and Mouritsen, R. 1992. The international research programme on the ecology and status of the long-finned pilot whale off the Faroe Islands: Presentation, results and references. Fróðskaparrit 40: 9–29.
- Heide‐Jørgensen, M.P., Bloch, D., Stefansson, E., Mikkelsen, B., Helen Ofstad, L. and Dietz, R., 2002. Diving behaviour of long‐finned pilot whales Globicephala melas around the Faroe Islands. Wildlife Biology, 8(4): 307–313.

Other publications include:

- Bloch, D., Jákupsson, B. and Arnskov, S. 1980. Faroese flowers. Tórshavn: Føroya Fróðskaparfelag
- Bloch, D., Aldenius, J. and Lindell, T. 1982. List to K. Hansen: Vascular Plants in the Faroes. Fróðskaparrit 30: 119–121.
- Bloch, D. and Sørensen, S. 1983. The autumn migration at Akraberg, Faroe Islands, 1982. Fróðskaparrit 31: 75–93.
- Bloch, D. and Sørensen, S. 1984. Yvirlit yvir Føroya fuglar. Tórshavn: Føroya Skúlabókagrunnur.
- Bloch, D. and Sørensen, S. 1988. Ferðafuglur. Tórshavn: Føroya Lærarafelag.
- Bloch, D. 1990. A note on the occurrence of land planarians in the Faroe Islands. Fróðskaparrit 38–39: 63–68.
- Baagøe, H. and Bloch, D. 1993. Bats (Chiroptera) in the Faroe Islands. Fróðskaparrit 41: 83–88.
- Bloch, D. and Mourier, H. 1993. Pests recorded in the Faroe Islands, 1986–1992. Fróðskaparrit 41: 69–82.
- Kaaber, S., Gjelstrup, P., Bloch, D. and Jensen, J.-K. 1993. Invasion af admiralen (Vanessa atalanta L.) og andre sommerfugle på Færøerne i 1992. Fróðskaparrit 41: 125–149.
- Bloch, D., Kristiansen, A. and Rasmussen, S. 1994 Jóannes í Króki 200 ár. Tórshavn: Føroya Froðskaparfelag
- Bloch, D., Jensen, J-K. and Olsen, B. 1996. Listi yvir fuglar sum eru sæddir í Føroyum. Torshavn: Føroya Náttúrugripasavn
- Bloch, D. and Enckell, P.H. (eds.). 1998 Proceedings from: Environmental change in North Atlantic Islands Tórshavn, Faroe Islands, 17–20 May 1998. Tórshavn: Føroya Fróðskaparfelag
- Bloch, D. and Fuglø, E. 1999. Villini súgdjór í Útnorðri Tórshavn: Føroya Skúlabókagrunnur.
- Bloch, D. and Náttúrugripasavn, F. 2000 Færøernes grindefangst med en tilføjelse om døglingefangsten Tórshavn: Føroya Náttúrugripasavn
- Bloch, D. and Sneli, J-A. 2005. The marine mollusca of the Faroes. Tórshavn :Fróðskaparfelag Føroya

== Awards ==
- 1999 – Mentanarvirðisløn MA Jacobsen (M. A. Jacobsens Cultural Prize) in literature for the book Villini súgdjór í Útnorðri.
- 2012 – Miðlaheiðurslønin (Faroe Media Prize) for public dissemination.
