= Jørgen-Frantz Jacobsen =

Faroese writer (1900–1938)

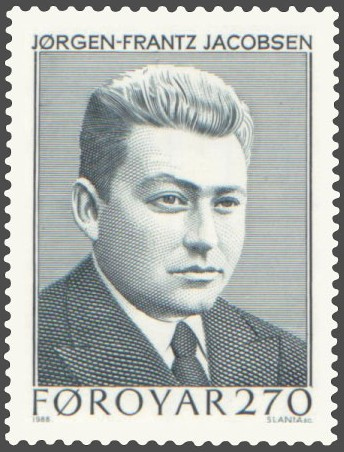
- Stamp of Jørgen-Frantz Jacobsen
- Born: 29 November 1900; Tórshavn
- Died: 24 March 1938 (aged 37)
- Occupation: writer

Jørgen-Frantz Jacobsen (29 November 1900 – 24 March 1938) was a Faroese writer. He has a distinct place in Scandinavian literature, as he is the only Faroese writer to achieve international best-seller status. This status derives from his sole (unfinished) novel, Barbara (1939). The novel was translated into five other languages shortly after the first edition in the Danish language. It was also adapted as a motion picture directed by Nils Malmros in 1997 (see Barbara).

These facts, together with Jacobsen's essays, a study of the Faroe Islands published in the guise of a travel guide, and a volume of his letters, are sufficient to suggest that had he lived longer, he would have been one of the outstanding literary figures in Scandinavia in the twentieth century. He was one of five Faroese writers, all born between 1900 and 1903, who represented a remarkable blossoming of literature in a country which had no tradition of literature in a modern sense. Jacobsen, together with William Heinesen, Christian Matras, Heðin Brú, and Martin Joensen, created modern Faroese literature, whether writing in Danish, as did Jacobsen and Heinesen, or the Faroese language, as did the others.

== Early years ==
Jørgen-Frantz Jacobsen was born on 29 November 1900 in Tórshavn. His father, merchant Martin Meinhardt Jacobsen, was of Faroese, Swedish, and Danish descent, and, having been born and spent his childhood in Copenhagen, was mainly Danish speaking. His mother, Maren Frederikke Mikkelsen, was thoroughly Faroese. Their home was thus bilingual, and, according to Heinesen, a distant relative, Jørgen-Frantz spoke Danish to his father and Faroese to his mother and siblings. In general, their extended family was interested in music and theater, and Jørgen-Frantz thus grew up in a highly cultured environment.

He first went to school in Tórshavn, where he took his middle-school examination. He began attending Sorø Academy in Denmark in 1916. His father died the following year, but Jacobsen continued his studies, passing his final examination and leaving school in 1919. Armed with this degree, he went to the University of Copenhagen to study history and French, but in 1922 he developed tuberculosis, and ill health prevented him from finishing his studies until 1932. After graduation, he worked for two years as a journalist on the newspaper Politiken. He gave up journalism in 1934 in order to write a history of the Greenland monopoly—a work that he never finished, in large part because of continued ill health.

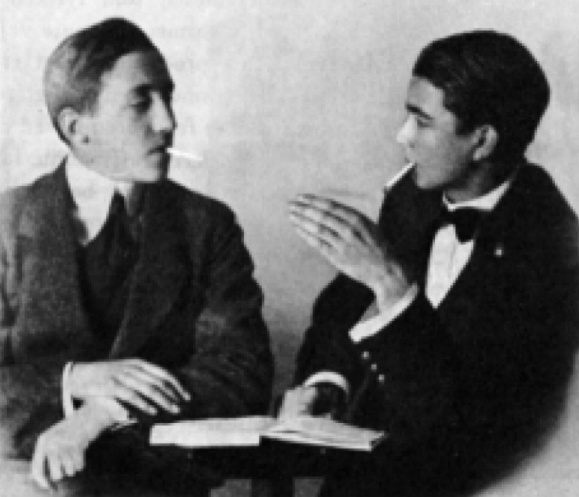
Faroe Islands writers William Heinesen and Jørgen-Frantz Jacobsen, 1918 (both at the age of 18)

== Faroese sympathies ==
In 1927, Jacobsen was asked by representatives of the Faroese Students' Association to write a study of the relationship between the Faroe Islands and Denmark. The result was Danmark og Færøerne (Denmark and the Faroe Islands, 1927) a competent and well-written study that first examines the historical relationship between the two countries and then the cultural awakening of the Faroe Islands, with brief summaries of the works of the main figures concerned, finishing with a review of present-day relations between the two countries. Here, as elsewhere in his writings, he stresses the fact that the Faroese are not Danes, that their cultures and temperaments are quite different. Without being openly anti-Danish, he clearly reveals himself as an ardent Faroese nationalist. His Faroese sympathies are also evident in his 1936 publication Færøerne: Natur og Folk (The Faroes: Nature and People), a warm, fond, and poetical presentation of the Faroe Islands, their scenery, their way of life, their history, their constitution, and their links with Denmark. The final section is a tour of the islands with a brief entry on each of the eighteen inhabited islands. The literary qualities of this book are emphasized in the entry in Dansk Biografisk Leksikon from 1937, which reads that the volume "er anlagt som en grundig Vejleder for rejsende, men samtid skrevet med en Kærlighed til Stoffet, der hæver Bogen op over Genren og gør den til en Digters Værk" ("is in the form of a thorough guide for travelers, but at the same time written with a love of the material that raises the book above the genre and turns it into the work of a poet").

== Newspaper articles ==
In 1943, Christian Matras collected and published a volume of Jacobsen's newspaper articles under the title of Nordiske Kroniker ("Nordic Chronicles"). Originally published between 1925 and 1937, the articles cover a wide range of topics, some of which are related to those in Danmark og Færøerne, while others have a wider cultural interest, as for instance the essay on the Faroese dance. The term "Nordic" is to be understood in a wide sense, including not only mainland Scandinavia and Iceland, but also England and the Shetland Islands. In these articles Jacobsen discusses the extinction of the Norn language of the Shetland Islands and examines the nature of Faroese as an independent language, ridiculing the suggestion that it is really only a dialect; in another essay, "Den yderste Kyst" (The Farthest Shore), he produces an outstandingly beautiful and poetical description of the outlying island of Mykines.

== Letters ==
=== Patrons ===
Det dyrebare Liv: Jørgen-Frantz Jacobsen i Strejflys af hans Breve (Precious Life: Jørgen-Frantz Jacobsen Illuminated by his Letters, 1958), edited by Heinesen, is an example of the way in which Jacobsen's close friends and contemporaries ensured his survival as a writer. It consists of letters that Jacobsen wrote to Heinesen between 1921 and his death in 1938. They are accompanied by a succinct commentary by Heinesen sufficient to string them together, but not such as in any way to turn this into a scholarly, academic edition of the letters. It is ultimately a deeply personal and poetical work, but nevertheless a work of vital importance to an understanding of Jacobsen and his sole novel. In his introduction, Heinesen makes it clear that this is only a small selection of letters, which in total fill some 1,500 pages, and that it is, strictly speaking, not an autobiography. There is no attempt to follow Jacobsen's life day by day, but rather to give a series of momentary impressions of his life and opinions both as a young student and as a mature man marked by the tuberculosis that was to lead to his early death. It is not intended to idealize Jacobsen, but to show his incredible optimism and love of the life that he must surely at an early stage have been aware he was to leave before long. In the words of Heinesen in the introduction:

Det udvalg af Jørgen-Frantz Jacobsens breve, der bringes her—for det meste i uddrag, nogle dog in extenso—handler hovedsagelig om brevskriveren selv, om betydningsfulde tildragelser i hans liv, og om det sind, hvormed han møder denne sin skæbne.

The selection of Jørgen-Frantz Jacobsen's letters here presented—mainly in the form of excerpts, though some in extenso—is principally about the letter-writer himself, the significant events in his life, and the mental qualities with which he meets this his fate.

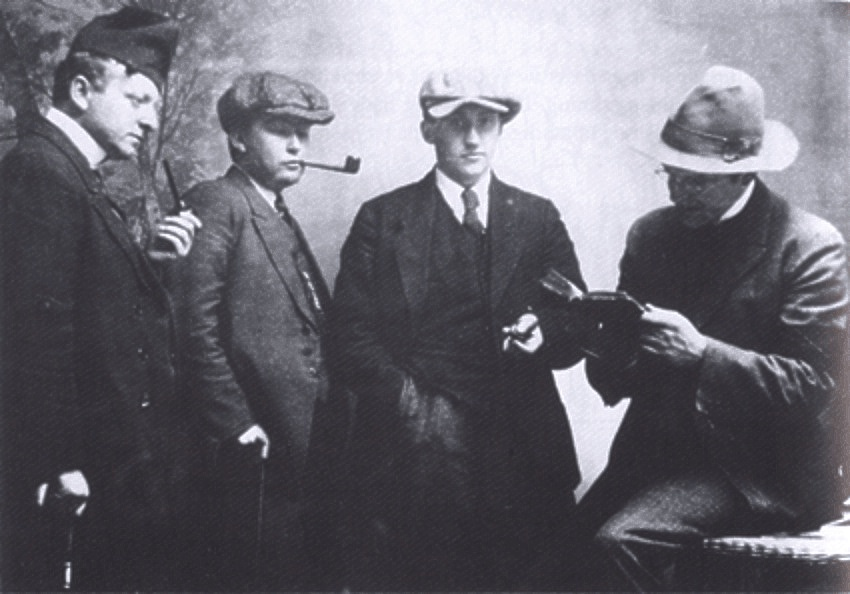
The big four of Faroese literature. From left to right: Janus Djurhuus, Jørgen-Frantz Jacobsen, William Heinesen and Hans Andreas Djurhuus, 1924

=== Style ===
In addition, the letters demonstrate Jacobsen's unswerving sense of style, his linguistic inventiveness, and give the reader insight into the background to the novel Barbara and the close relationship between Jacobsen and Heinesen, which a comparison of these letters with Heinesen's own writing suggests had a profound literary as well as personal significance. One is, in fact, at times left with a feeling that these letters contain clues to a literary affinity of a special kind between two friends who had many stylistic traits in common.

=== Structure ===
The selection opens with the "Nytårsouverture" (New Year's Overture), marking the start of 1921 in a grand, dithyrambic prose poem divided into sections with musical markings: Maestoso, Grave, Andante, and so on, and describing the writer's experience of the Faroe Islands—which are at the center of everything he wrote—at the beginning of 1921. There is then a gap until mid-1922, when there follows, in a completely different vein, a lengthy, humorous account of French student life in Grenoble, in which Jacobsen shows his skill at instant characterization. Yet, even Grenoble is constantly compared with Tórshavn: the sunrise, the grass on the bastion, the mist-covered mountaintops—all of these images give the reader a sense of the author's homesickness. The following section consists of letters written at the end of 1922 and beginning of 1923, by which time Jacobsen had been diagnosed as suffering from tuberculosis. They are as good-humored as the earlier ones and express for the first time Jacobsen's remarkably positive acceptance of what life sent him:

Jeg mener, at enhver må glæde sig over sin skæbne, over at han overhovedet har levet og fået en skæbne. Skæbnen er det eneste sikre aktiv.

Mennesker fødes og får livets gave. Livet giver de ud og får det ind igen i møntet guld, i skæbne. Giv livet ud og du tager skæbne ind igen. "Evigt ejes kun det tabte"--evigt ejes kun skæbnerne.

I believe that everyone must rejoice in his destiny, in the fact that he has lived at all and achieved a destiny. Destiny is the only sure asset.

People are born and receive the gift of life. They distribute life and they receive it again in stamped gold, in destiny. Distribute life and you take in fate in exchange. "Only what is lost is owned eternally"--only fates are owned eternally.)

In the letters, momentary impressions are balanced against long, poetic epistles such as a nearly eight-page atmospheric description of the streams around Tórshavn that is more in the nature of an essay than a letter and which was actually dedicated to Heinesen's eldest son. Jacobsen also reflects on the qualities of writers such as Sigrid Undset, whose work gives her a unique position in Scandinavian literature, as Jacobsen notes, "der ellers, hvor udmærket den end kan være, oftest kun er skrevet for et snævert publikum . . ." (which otherwise, excellent as it might be, is mostly written for a narrow public . . .).

=== Content ===
Inevitably, in the letters Jacobsen becomes increasingly concerned with his lengthy stays in the hospital, his operations, and his sickness, but he writes with humor and without a trace of self-pity. His love of life and his acceptance of his own fate dominate all. It was in the midst of his sickness that he wrote his novel, Barbara, while suffering from the fickleness of his lover, Estrid Bannister, and the collection provides a letter-by-letter account of the writing of the novel, ending in his last letter with the statement that three chapters still wait to be written. Of the intended contents of those chapters, he gives no hint, though he does state clearly that the novel is based on "the great human theme of Vanity"—and later develops this theme irrespective of the novel:

Livet er i sin storladne og paradoksale mangfoldighed så lunefuldt, at man gør vel i at spørge sig selv om man egentlig bør tage det helt alvorligt! . . . Min egen livsfølelse er også af en paradoksal art. Thi samtidig med at jeg elsker livet og næsten daglig--selv nu--nyder dets mangefarvede dråber, så folder jeg dog hænderne og sukker lykkeligt: Hvad er det dog alt.

Life in its grandiose and paradoxical manifoldness is so capricious that one does well to ask oneself if one should take it entirely seriously! . . . My own way of realizing myself is also paradoxical in nature. For at the same time as I love life and almost every day--even now--enjoy its many-colored droplets, I nevertheless fold my hands and happily sigh: What is it at best.

Later Jacobsen writes:

Det er jo netop den vældige spænding mellem sorrig og glæde, der gør livet stort. . . . Mine største øjeblikke har jeg haft når gnisterne er sprunget mellem sorrig og glæde. Og døden er i grunden livets geniale relief. . . . Livet er stort og dæmonisk, værd at elske og lyde. Og det allerstørste i livet er igen resignationen.

It is precisely the enormous tension between sorrow and joy that makes life great. . . . I have had my greatest moments when the sparks have flown between sorrow and joy. And death is fundamentally the brilliant relief to life. . . . Life is great and demonic, worthy of being loved and obeyed. And the greatest thing in life is again resignation.

== The novel Barbara ==
These themes are fundamental to the novel Barbara. It is, however, worth noting that Jacobsen at one time considered giving the novel the title "Far, verden, Far Vel!" (Farewell, World, Farewell), the first line of the great Danish Baroque poet Thomas Kingo's poem on vanity that forms the central theme of the episode in the church in the novel.

=== Overarching theme ===
Vanity in all its senses is the essence of Barbara: the vanity that comes with office, power, or beauty; and the vanity of action, the questioning of whether there is a meaning in life, or whether all action is not in vain, with everything the result of fate. There is also the examination of total infatuation on the part of the principal male character, Pastor Poul, alongside the beautiful, fascinating, and mercurial Barbara, whose feelings for Poul are genuine, but who cannot resist the charms of other men, insisting all the time that her feelings for Poul are unchanged.

=== Plot ===
The action is simple, even predictable. The aptly named ship Fortuna arrives in Tórshavn, bringing Poul, the new pastor for the parish of Vágar, and the populace has gathered for the event. Among them is Barbara, the widow of two former pastors for whose untimely deaths she is blamed by many. Pastor Poul is warned about her but falls for her charms, despite the fact that when three French ships come to port she follows the example of most of the other women in the town and allows herself to be seduced by a French sailor. As the widow of the parish, she has a house of her own on Vágar, and she and Poul leave for their respective homes there. Inevitably, they marry, but when in Tórshavn on a subsequent visit, Barbara meets and falls for the foppish Andreas Heyde (the instrument of fate in the second half of the novel), on a research trip from Copenhagen. Poul persuades Barbara to leave with him; however, when Christmas approaches he feels duty-bound to visit the outlying island of Mykines, despite Barbara's entreaties that he must not do so. Andreas has now arrived nearby to spend Christmas at the home of the chief magistrate of the island. Despite his misgivings, Poul answers the call of duty, hoping to return almost immediately, but he is delayed by the weather for eleven days, and on his return he discovers that Barbara has left for Tórshavn with Andreas. Andreas is finally persuaded by his uncle, Johan Hendrik, to leave for Copenhagen, without Barbara, and she makes a desperate and futile attempt to reach his ship, once more the Fortuna, as it leaves. When she returns, exhausted, she is greeted by the people of Tórshavn in a mock repetition of the first scene in the book, to the words of her jealous cousin, Gabriel, who has meanwhile been forced into an unwelcome but advantageous marriage: "Hi, hi, nu tror jeg faneme … at Glansen endelig en Gang er gaaet af Sankte Gertrud. Nu er hun saagu færdig, den Mær!" (He he, now I think, the devil eat me ... that the shine has at last gone off Saint Gertrude. Now she is finished, by God, the bitch!)

It is not clear whether Gabriel is right. Barbara has weathered storms before. But this is as far as Jacobsen wrote before succumbing to his tuberculosis. When Heinesen and Matras undertook to have the manuscript published, they came to the conclusion that this open ending was in fact a fitting way of finishing the novel, although a few gaps in the writing were filled in by Heinesen. That they were right to leave the ending open is demonstrated by the general dissatisfaction felt by viewers to the sentimentalized ending of the 1997 motion-picture adaptation, in which it appears that Barbara actually makes the ship and sails off to Copenhagen.

Barbara is a bewildering personality who possesses a special charm of her own along with a total lack of moral sense. She is incapable of withstanding her erotic urges, and her only resort is to flee temptation. On repeated occasions, Poul—a pitiful figure at times—has to accept this, and he is in no doubt as to his own position. As soon as Andreas appears and delights the assembled company, Poul knows he is doomed:

[Barbara] var i dette øjeblik hans Fjende, det følte han. Det vilde være en haabløs Gerning at gaa op til hende og søge at lokke hende bort fra dette Sted. Han var uden Magt over hende, hun gjorde i et og alt, hvad hun selv vilde. Hun var en kat, hun var frygtelig. . . . Han tiltaltes af Glansen i hans [Andreas'] væsen. Og samtidig vidste han, at dette betød hans egen Ruin.

Det uundgaaelige var nu ganske nær.

[Barbara] was at that moment his enemy, he could feel it. It would be a hopeless undertaking to go up to her and try to lure her away from this place. He had no power over her; in everything she did exactly as she pleased. She was a cat, she was frightful. . . . He was attracted by the brightness of his [Andreas'] presence. But at the same time he knew that it betokened the end for him.

The inevitable was about to happen.

He is doomed, and he always has been doomed, as is suggested when, on the way to Vágar for the first time, Pastor Poul is told the story of an earlier pastor who outwitted an attempt by two elfin women to seduce him in an enchanted mound. The parallel between this story and Pastor Poul's going to Vágar with Barbara is obvious, but he is not wise enough to escape.

=== Historical notations ===
Jacobsen was an historian by training; he was extremely well versed in Faroese history and understood Faroese society, and the novel thus has scene after scene in which the reader is presented with a vibrant portrayal of the mid-eighteenth-century Faroe Islands, descriptions of dress, furnishings, and customs. All of the characters are said to be recognizable portraits of actual historical people. Most are not readily identifiable, but the character of Andreas Heyde is clearly based on J. C. Svabo, who did, in fact, as is noted in Jacobsen's first work, Danmark og Færøerne, undertake a study of the Faroese economy in the late eighteenth century, only slightly later than the setting for this novel.

=== Character study ===
The principal character in the novel, Barbara, is based upon Jacobsen's lover, Estrid Bannister (later Estrid Bannister Good), who was also the translator of the first English version of the book. Many passages in Det dyrebare Liv refer to the title character of the novel, though it is nowhere directly revealed that she and Estrid were the same. However, Estrid was the Barbara of the novel and by the time Det dyrebare Liv was published, the identity of the two was common knowledge. It is worth noting that Jacobsen once remarked that he had tried to fashion Pastor Poul after himself.

== Death ==
Jørgen-Frantz Jacobsen died on 24 March 1938, after suffering from tuberculosis for nearly sixteen years. His position in Scandinavian literature is unlike that of any other; much of what has been published results from the decision by Christian Matras and William Heinesen to preserve his memory. The one novel on which his reputation rests is unfinished and yet could scarcely have been finished more successfully, and this incomplete work has had enormous sales both in Scandinavia and beyond, standing as a milestone in twentieth-century Scandinavian fiction.

== Writings by the author ==
=== Books ===
- Danmark og Færøerne, Kultur og Videnskab, no. 25 (Copenhagen: V. Pio, 1927).
- Færøerne: Natur og Folk, English chapter summaries by T. King (Tórshavn: H. N. Jacobsens Bókahandils forlag, 1936).
- Barbara: Roman (Copenhagen: Gyldendal, 1939).
- Nordiske Kroniker, edited by Christian Matras (Copenhagen: Gyldendal, 1943).

=== Editions in English ===
- Barbara, translated by W. Glyn Jones (Sawtry, UK: Dedalus Books, 2013).
- Barbara, translated by George Johnston (Norwich, UK: Norvik Press, 1993).
- Barbara, translated by Estrid Bannister (London, Great Britain: Penguin Books, 1948).

=== Letters ===
- Det dyrebare Liv: Jørgen-Frantz Jacobsen i Strejflys af hans Breve, edited by William Heinesen (Copenhagen: Gyldendal, 1958).

== Other sources ==
- Hedin Brønner, Three Faroese Novelists: An Appreciation of Jørgen-Frantz Jacobsen, William Heinesen and Hedin Brú (New York: Twayne, 1973), pp. 21–37.
- Bo Elbrønd-Bek, "Jørgen-Frantz Jacobsen--mellem tradition og modernitet," Bogens verden, 68, no. 2 (1986): 54–56.
- William Heinesen, "Jørgen-Frantz Jacobsen," in Danske digtere i det 20. århundrede, second edition, 3 volumes, edited by Frederik Nielsen and Ole Restrup (Copenhagen: Gad, 1966), II: 611–624.
- Karsten Hoydal, "Jørgen-Frantz Jacobsen," Vardin, 47 (1980): 248–260.
- Anna Catrina Jacobsen, "Jørgen-Frantz Jacobsen," Vardin, 57 (1990): 113–121.
- Ole Jacobsen, "Jørgen-Frantz Jacobsen" in Danske digtere i det 20. århundrede, revised edition, 2 volumes, edited by Ernst Frandsen and Niels Kaas Johansen (Copenhagen: Gad, 1955), II: 283–289.
- W. Glyn Jones, "Duality and Dualism: Jørgen-Frantz Jacobsen Reassessed," Scandinavica, 27 (November 1988): 133–151.
- Christian Matras, "Jørgen-Frantz Jacobsen," in his Den yderste Kyst, Gyldendals Julebog, 1941 (Copenhagen: Gyldendal, 1941), pp. 8–35.
- Kristian Mørk, "Om Jørgen-Frantz Jacobsens 'Barbara,'" Spring, 11 (1997): 16–30.
- Hanne Flohr Sørensen, "Det begyndte som leg: William Heinesens og Jørgen-Frantz Jacobsens brevveksling," Danske Studier, 87 (1992): 59–91.
