= Centre of Maritime Studies and Engineering =

- Vinnuháskúlin
- Motto: Navigare necesse est vivere non est necesse
- Motto in English: To sail is necessary, to live is not necessary
- Type: Public
- Established: 2005
- Director: Wilhelm Petersen
- Academic staff: 23
- Administrative staff: 2
- Undergraduates: over 200
- Location: Tórshavn, Faroe Islands
- Website: www.vh.fo

The Centre of Maritime Studies and Engineering (Faroese: Vinnuháskúlin) is a vocational maritime school located in Tórshavn. It offers three year shipmaster and marine engineer courses as well as other maritime related courses. It was established in 2005 after the merger of the Faroese Nautical School, the Engineers School and the Faroese Firefighting School.

== History ==
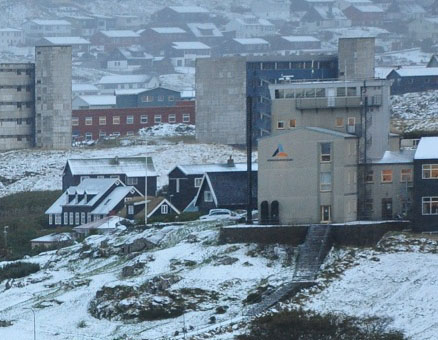
Vinnuháskúlin is located in Tórshavn.

Maritime education started in the Faroe Islands by private institutions in late 19th century. Two skippers Jens Mohr and Jens í Dali established two maritime schools (skipper schools) in Tórshavn in 1893. In 1896 Dánjal í Ungagarði established a skipper's school in Porkeri and Hans Djurholm started a skippers school in Glyvrar in Eysturoy in 1903. The two brothers Jákup and Jógvan Joensen (they were called "Jákup and Jógvan við Stein") started their skipper's school in Tórshavn in 1904. In 1905 Jens Pauli í Dali took over his father's school in Tórshavn. All these schools were private and only open in winther time from 1 November to late February. The first maritime school which was built for the same purpose opened on 1 November 1905 by the two Danes Viggo Ryving-Jensen and Andrias Nielsen. In 1917 the exams became both oral and in writing. In 1925 Faroese fishermen went to Greenland to fish, but the problem was that the education of the skippers and the first mates on the Faroese fishing boats only permitted them to steer and manoeuvre a boat or ship around the Faroe Island and not as far as in the waters near Greenland. Faroese authorities therefore asked Danish authorities for help. In 1927 Danish authorities established a Maritime school in Tórshavn. They restored the school building, Sjómansskúlin, of Ryving-Jensen and Styrmand Nielsen, which at that point had stopped teaching and used it for the new maritime educations. A Dane, H. A. Guldhammer, was the principal for the first two years, after that Jens Pauli í Dali was the principal until 1956. In 1929 the school started an education for motormen.

In 1962 a new building for the maritime educations was built in Tórshavn and the same year the first sea captain class (ship master, in Faroese called Skipsførari) started. This first class finished a half year later in spring 1963, it took only 6 months, but in order to meet the requirements for the sea captain education, they had to have the first mate education first (Faroese: Skipari). In 1973 the sea captain education was twice as long and took one year. In 1986 a new law changed this kind of education and made it a 3-year long education. Until 1992, sea captain and ship master education were different, whereas a sea captain was a captain on board of a fishing vessel, while a ship master was considered a captain of a large cargo vessel or a ferry. That changed in 1992 when the curriculum was reformed so as the sea captain education to be a part of the ship master education.

Marine engineers were trained in a separate school called Maskinmeistaraskúlin. In 1997 to 2000 the school was expanded and renovated and in 2004 the Minister of Education and Culture of the Faroe Islands announced that the two schools Maskinmeistaraskúlin and the Føroya Sjómansskúli would be merged into a new maritime school, the Centre of Maritime Studies and Engineering (Faroese: Vinnuháskúlin).

== Studies ==
The Centre of Maritime Studies & Engineering offers three-year long education to become a shipmaster or a marine engineer. It also offers nine months studies including six months of theory and three months of different courses in order to get a skipper's or a marine engineer for ships having engines smaller than 3,000kW. The school has over 200 students, 23 employees as teaching staff and 2 employees as administrative staff. The firefighting school is a part of the Centre of Maritime Studies & Engineering, while it also offers individual courses. In 2009 there were 55 graduates from the school.

Admission of new students takes place twice a year, in August and in December. Admission requirements include a lower secondary education diploma, while the navigation programs ask for seafaring experience and the engineering programs require the attendance of classes in physics, mathematics and chemistry plus some working experience.

== See also ==
- Education in the Faroe Islands
