= Føroya Studentaskúli og HF-Skeið =

Public school in Hoyvík, Faroe Islands

Coordinates: 62.0272°N 6.7647°W

Location
- Sanatoriivegur 13, FO-188; Hoyvík; Faroe Islands

Information
- Type: Public
- Established: 1937
- Rector: Herleif Hammer
- Colour
- Website: https://web.archive.org/web/20150814211050/http://www.hoydalar.fo/

Føroya Studentaskúli og HF-Skeið is a high school in the valley of Hoydalar, outside Tórshavn, the capital of the Faroe Islands. It has over 900 students enrolled. The institution is the Faroe Islands' eldest and biggest high school.

== History ==
The school was founded in 1937. In 1962 it moved to Hoydalar. A new school for the high school is planned to be built now in Marknagil in Tórshavn, the project is called Marknagilsdepilin. It is scheduled to open in 2016.

== Studies structure ==
Students under the age of 18 are enrolled for a 3-year period (Student). Older students can achieve a diploma after only a 2-year period (HF). The curricula and final exams vary between the two but the diplomas achieved after the finals are of equal value.

=== Underaged ===
Students choosing Student (the 3-year period) can choose between the mathematics line and the language line. The former is focusing on science while the latter mainly consists of language-courses. Students on both lines have courses on a lower level from the other line, e.g. the language students have mathematic on C-level.

=== Adults ===
Students choosing HF (the 2-year period) have the same courses as the student on the 3-year period but with different curricula. To obtain a diploma the students have to attend a final exam in all courses, as opposed to the 3-years period where students only attend final exams in some of the courses (selected by lot).

== See also ==
- Education in the Faroe Islands
