= University of the Faroe Islands =

State-run university located in Tórshavn, Faroe Islands

Coordinates: 62°00′26″N 6°46′48″W

- Fróðskaparsetur Føroya
- Latin: Academia Færoensis
- Motto: Mildar veittrar tendraðu ein vita føroyum stjørnuleið frá øld til øld
- Motto in English: Gentle elves set light to lead the Faroes on the starry way from age to age
- Type: Public
- Established: 1965; 1870 (Teachers' Seminary); 1920 (Nursing School)
- Affiliations: UArctic
- Budget: 115.000.000 DKK (2020)
- Rector: Martin T. Zachariasen
- Faculty: 45
- Undergraduates: 558 (2010)
- Postgraduates: 23 (2010)
- Doctoral students: 5 (2010)
- Other students: 65 (2010)
- Location: Tórshavn, Faroe Islands
- Website: www.setur.fo

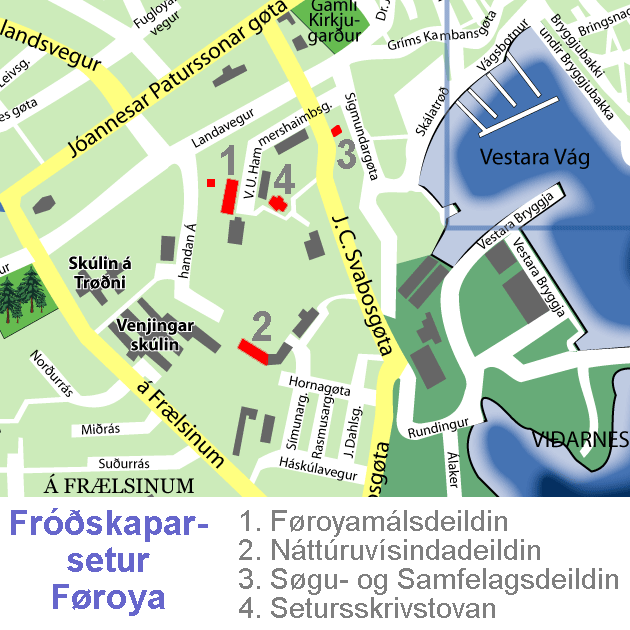
Map of a part of Tórshavn, showing where the university buildings are located.

The University of the Faroe Islands (Faroese: Fróðskaparsetur Føroya) is a state-run university located in Tórshavn, the capital of the Faroe Islands. It consists of five faculties: Faculty of Faroese Language and Literature, Faculty of Social Sciences and History, Faculty of Education, Faculty of Science and Technology and Faculty of Health Sciences. The University offers bachelors, masters, and Ph.D. programs. The student body is relatively small (around 1000). The University organises an annual dissertation competition open to all students. The educational language of the university is Faroese, making it the only university in the world to conduct classes officially in the Faroese language. Some classes are taught in other languages. The University works closely with the University of Copenhagen and the University of Iceland for research projects and is a member of UArctic.

== History ==
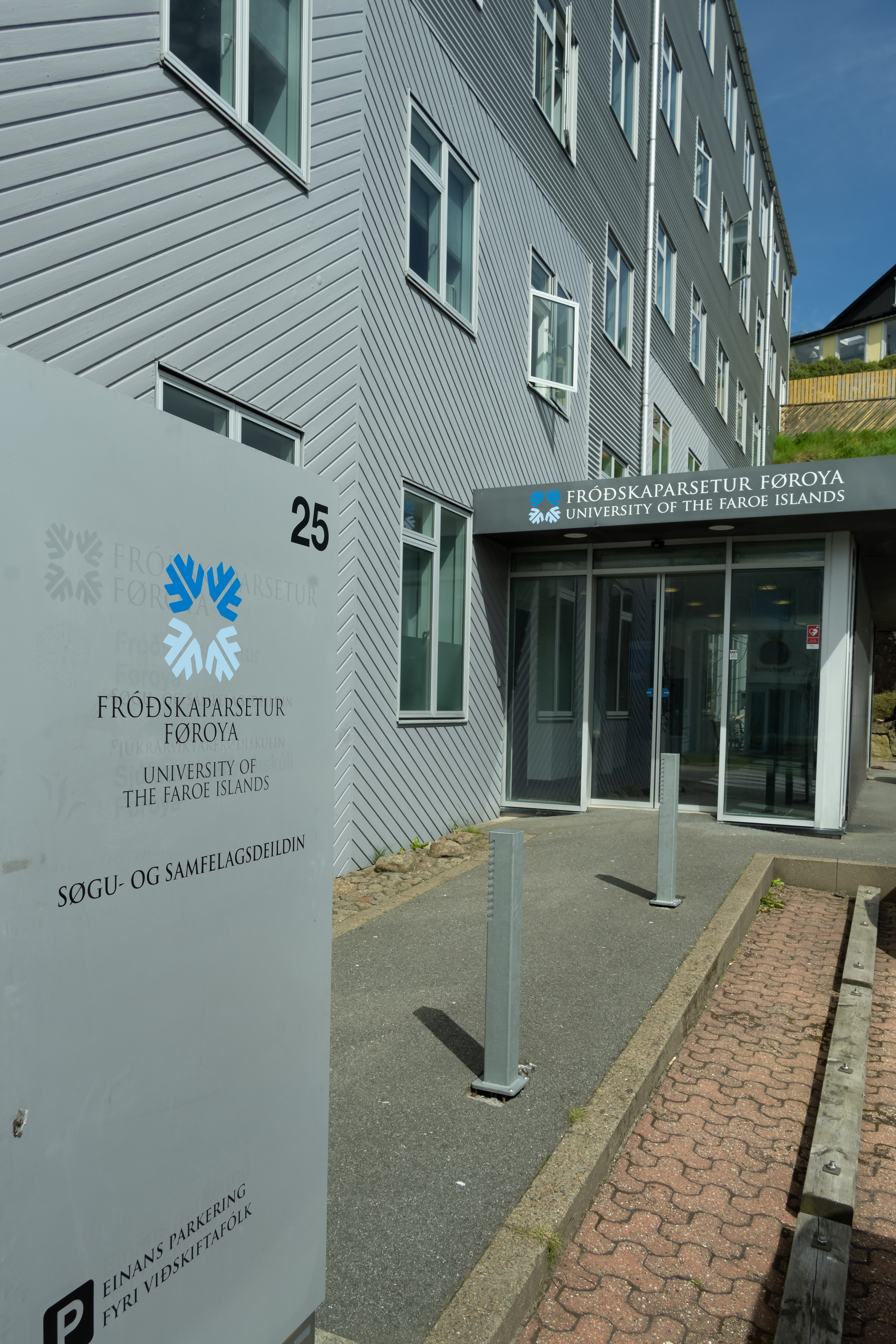
Buildings

The University of the Faroe Islands was founded in 1965 by members of the Faroese Scientific Society, founded in 1952. Among their activities, the Society published a scientific periodical and carried out comprehensive work on the compilation of Faroese vocabulary.

The university began with one professor, Christian Matras, and a registrar, Maud Heinesen. In its first years the school offered one-year courses in natural history and Faroese language for teachers. The University arranged for a collection committee with the task of preserving all Faroese folk culture. Today this material is in the archives of the Faculty of Faroese Language and Literature. A further committee was appointed in 1972 to collect Faroese hymns and spiritual ballads.

On 1 August 2008 the Faroese School of Education and the Faroese School of Nursing were incorporated into the University, becoming its 4th and 5th departments.

== Organisation and administration ==
The University of the Faroe Islands is administered by a board of seven directors. Four are appointed directly by the minister, while the remaining three are appointed on recommendation from the university. The Board of Directors is responsible for appointing the rector. The rector is currently Martin Tvede Zachariasen.

The University of the Faroe Islands is publicly funded. In 2010 the university was allocated 68,178,000 DKK by the Faroese government. Apart from the government, the university also receives funding for specific projects from the Danish Agency for Science, Technology and Innovation, as well as from the private sector.

The university is an active member of the University of the Arctic. UArctic is an international cooperative network based in the Circumpolar Arctic region, consisting of more than 200 universities, colleges, and other organizations with an interest in promoting education and research in the Arctic region.

The university participates in UArctic's mobility program north2north. The aim of that program is to enable students of member institutions to study in different parts of the North.

== Academic profile ==
The University of the Faroe Islands is divided into five faculties: Faroese Language and Literature, History and Social Sciences, Education, Science and Technology, and Health Sciences.

The university offers a total of eighteen different first degree (bachelor's) courses. These include:

- BA Faroese Language and Literature
- BSc History, Small Nations and Globalisation
- BL in Law
- BSc Social Science in Politics and Administration
- Bachelor of Education in Primary and Lower Secondary Education
- Bachelor in Pedagogical Development
- BSc Nursing
- BSc Software Engineering
- BSc Biology
- BSc in Molecular Life Science

There are also nine master's degree courses. These include:

- MA in Faroese Language and Literature
- MA (Masters of Arts) in Law
- MLP (Master of Legal Practice, known in Faroese as Embætisprógv í lóg, abbreviated as Emb.L.) in Laws
- Master of Science in Health

There are also joint masters degree courses in cooperation with the University of Greenland, the University of Akureyri, the University of Iceland, and the University of Nordland:

- MA/MSc West Nordic Studies, Governance and Sustainable Management

For 2010 there were reported to be 146 students in the Department of Nursing. A further 266 students were reported in the Department of Education (formerly the Faroese Teachers Training School) Finally there were 146 undergraduate students, 23 postgraduate students, 5 Ph.D. candidates, and 65 students who took single courses or minor subjects in the other departments.

=== Research ===
Research is a priority of the University of the Faroe Islands. Its mission is to increase knowledge within the university and in Faroese society. Research is focused on various fields including linguistics and literature of Faroese language, education, didactics, competitiveness, democracy, weather, tidal streams, waves and aquaculture. The Research Center for Social Development is an institution connected with the university which undertakes 3- to 5-year research projects.

== Noted people ==
- Christian Matras, founder and first professor of the university
- Dorete Bloch, zoologist
- Jógvan á Lakjuni, politician and musician

== See also ==
- Education in the Faroe Islands
