= Christian Matras (poet) =

Faroese poet and academic

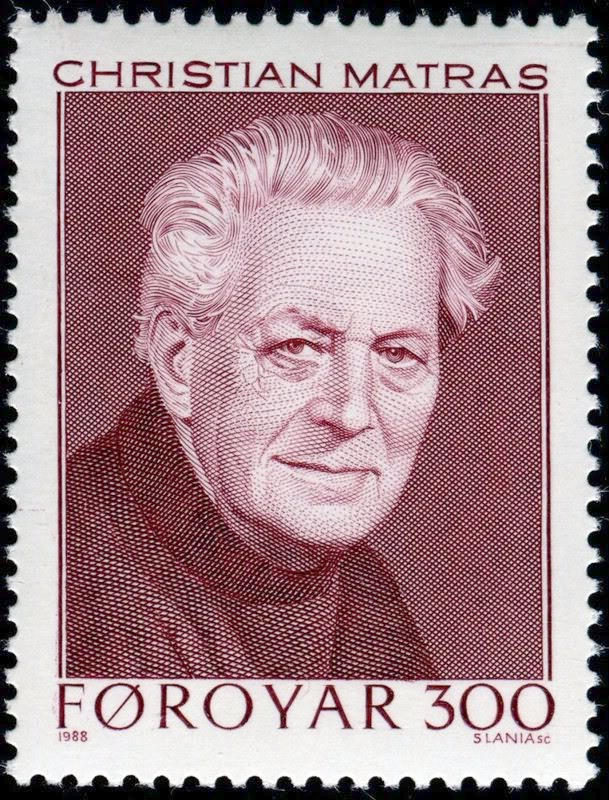
- Born: 7 December 1900; Viðareiði
- Died: 16 October 1988 (aged 87); Tórshavn
- Education: University of Copenhagen (PhD)

Christian Matras (7 December 1900 – 16 October 1988) was a Faroese poet and academic. He was the founding professor of the University of the Faroe Islands. He is one of the most important poets in Faroese literature.

== Life ==
Christian Matras was born in the village Viðareiði, Viðoy, located at far northern end of the Faroe Islands. The surname Matras goes back to an immigrant from France. He attended primary school until he moved to Tórshavn in 1912, where he attended secondary school. He was in a class with Jørgen-Frantz Jacobsen and William Heinesen. In 1920, Matras moved to Sorø, Denmark, where he completed his schooling

After graduation, Matras studied Scandinavian Studies at the University of Copenhagen. He also spent a semester in Norway, where he worked with Norwegian seals. In 1928, he obtained his MA in linguistics. In 1933 he took a doctor’s degree in Old Norse from the University of Copenhagen with his doctorate with a dissertation on the place name in the Faroe Islands. In 1936 Matras began working at the University of Copenhagen, becoming a professor of linguistics in 1952. He was the first Faroese person to become a professor, and until 2009 the only in Copenhagen.

In 1965 he returned to the Faroe Islands to become the founding professor and head of the department of Faroese language at the University of the Faroe Islands in Tórshavn. He produced an extensive body of work analyzing Faroese language, literature, and culture, until his retirement in 1971.

Matras died on 16 October 1988. A few months earlier he was honored with a stamp by Postverk Føroya. In October 2006, his birthplace Viðareiði announced the street name Kristjansgøta ( "Christian Street").

== Works ==
- 1926 Gratt, Katt og hat: yrkingar (drawings by William Heinesen ) - 48 p (collection of poems)
- 1927-1928: Føroysk-donsk BETA = Færøsk-Français (Färöisch- Danish dictionary, along with Mads Andreas Jacobsen, S. 469, further expenditure: *1961, Supplement 1974, 1977, 1995)
- 1933 - HEIMUR og heima: yrkingar - 59 p (collection of poems)
- 1935 - Føroysk bókmentasøga - 104 S. (Faroese literary history)
- 1939 - Indledning til Svabo færøske visehaandskrifter - lxxxv S. (Introduction to Jens Christian Svabo folksongs manuscripts)
- 1941 - Jørgen-Frantz Jacobsen. Gyldendals julebog - 45 p (in Danish with texts by Jacobsen)
- 1957 - Drunnur - 33 P.
- 1970 - Bygd og hav: Myndir úr seglskipatíð (images from Ingálvur av Reyni ) - 16 P.
- 1972 - Á hellu e.g. Stod: gamalt og nýyrkt - 103 S.
- 1975 - Av Viðareiði: folk í huganum (pictures of Fridtjof Joensen ) - 14 P.
- 1978 - Úr Sjón og úr minni (yrkingar) - ( "From my own observation and memory" - poems)
- 1986 - Úr Sjón og úr minni - ørindi = Seeing and remembering - Shipping - 47 p (poetry, Faroese-English)
- 1980 - Ulf Zachariasen (ed.): Christian Matras: ritskrá í úrvali - 32 P.
- 1993 - Anne-Kari Skarðhamar (trans.): DICT fra Færøyene: et Utvalg dikt - 120 p (in Norwegian)
- 2000 - Martin Næs and Jóhan Hendrik W. Poulsen (ed.): Greinaval - málfrøðigreinir - 353 S. - ISBN 99918-41-81-4 (linguistic essays)
- 2002 - Turið Sigurðardóttir (ed.): Chr. Matras - aldarminning - 118 S.
- 2004 - Anne-Kari Skarðhamar (ed.): Chr.Matras - Yrkingar: heildarsavn við og yrkingum týðingum - 397 S. - ISBN 99918-1-418-3 (poetry collection)

== Related reading ==
- Walter de Gruyter (2002) The Nordic Languages (Handbücher zur Sprach- und Kommunikationswissenschaft) ISBN 9783110197051
