= HMS Delhi (D47) =

Cruiser of the Royal Navy

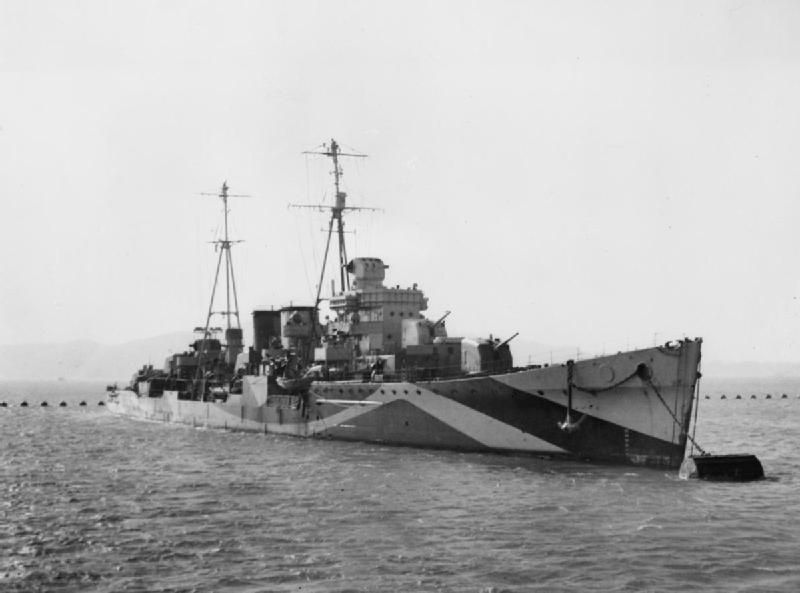
- HMS Delhi after refit, fitted with 5-inch/38 calibre guns

History

United Kingdom
- Name: HMS Delhi
- Ordered: July 1917
- Builder: Armstrong Whitworth
- Laid down: 29 October 1917
- Launched: 23 August 1918
- Commissioned: June 1919
- Identification: Pennant number: 6A (Nov 18); 74 (Nov 19); I.74 (1936); D.74 (1940)
- Fate: 22 January 1948 - Sold for scrap

General characteristics
- Class & type: Danae-class cruiser
- Displacement: 4,927 long tons (5,006 t) standard
- Length: 445 ft (136 m) p/p
- Beam: 46 ft 6 in (14.17 m)
- Draught: 14.4 ft (4.4 m) mean
- Propulsion: 2 × Brown Curtis geared steam turbines = 40,000 shp (30,000 kW)
- Speed: 29 kn (54 km/h; 33 mph)
- Range: 6,700 nmi (12,400 km; 7,700 mi)
- Complement: 450-469
- Armament: (As built); 6 × BL 6-inch 45 Calibre Mark XII guns; 2 × QF 3-inch 45 Calibre HA; 2 × QF 2-pdr 'Pom-pom' AA; (As refitted in 1941); 5 × 5-inch 38-calibre DP Mark 12 guns in Mounting Mark 30.; 8 × 40 mm Bofors AA (2 quadruple mounts); 12 × 20 mm Oerlikon AA
- Armour: Belt Armour: 1.5–3 in (38–76 mm); Deck Armour: 1 in (25 mm); Conning Tower: 3 in (76 mm)

HMS Delhi was a Danae-class cruiser that served with the Royal Navy through the Second World War, from the Caribbean to eastern China. She was laid down in 1917, launched in 1918 and commissioned for service in 1919, serving until decommissioning in mid-1945 due to extensive battle damage, and was to be scrapped in 1948 after lengthy war and peacetime service around the world.

== Service history ==
After completion, sea trials and working up as part the 1st Light Cruiser Squadron with the Atlantic Fleet, Delhi served in the Baltic as part of a wider multinational intervention in the Russian Civil War against the nascent Soviet republics. Departing the Baltic, Delhi returned to Britain and spent the next three years with the Atlantic Fleet.

She was to be chosen in 1923, along with her sisters Danae, Dauntless, Dragon and Dunedin, for the Empire Cruise of the Special Service Squadron, representing the most modern and most powerful cruisers of the Royal Navy, as escorts to the battlecruisers Hood and Repulse. Returning in December 1924, she was paid off from the Special Service Squadron and joined the 1st Cruiser Squadron with the Mediterranean Fleet in January 1925. After a brief ten-month detachment to the China Station, engaging in anti-piracy operations, she returned to the Mediterranean before being paid off to refit.

On 15 November 1925, Delhi left Malta in the company of HMAS Sydney and HMAS Adelaide and cruised to "southern skies" on a goodwill cruise which, from contemporary photographic sources, included Ceylon; Fremantle, Hobart, Jervis Bay, and Sydney (Australia); Christchurch and Wellington (New Zealand).

The 1930s dawned with Delhi cruising the Caribbean as part of the 8th Cruiser Squadron on the America and West Indies Station. During the Carib War, Delhi's guns were called to deter the actions of local insurgents on Dominica and landed a detachment of Royal Marines. As flagship, 8th Cruiser Squadron, she would once more operate in concert with Hood and Repulse during a visit to the West Indies, along with their escorts, the heavy cruisers Norfolk and Dorsetshire. Her West Indies service ended in 1933, and she deployed with the 3rd Cruiser Squadron, once again serving with the Mediterranean Fleet.

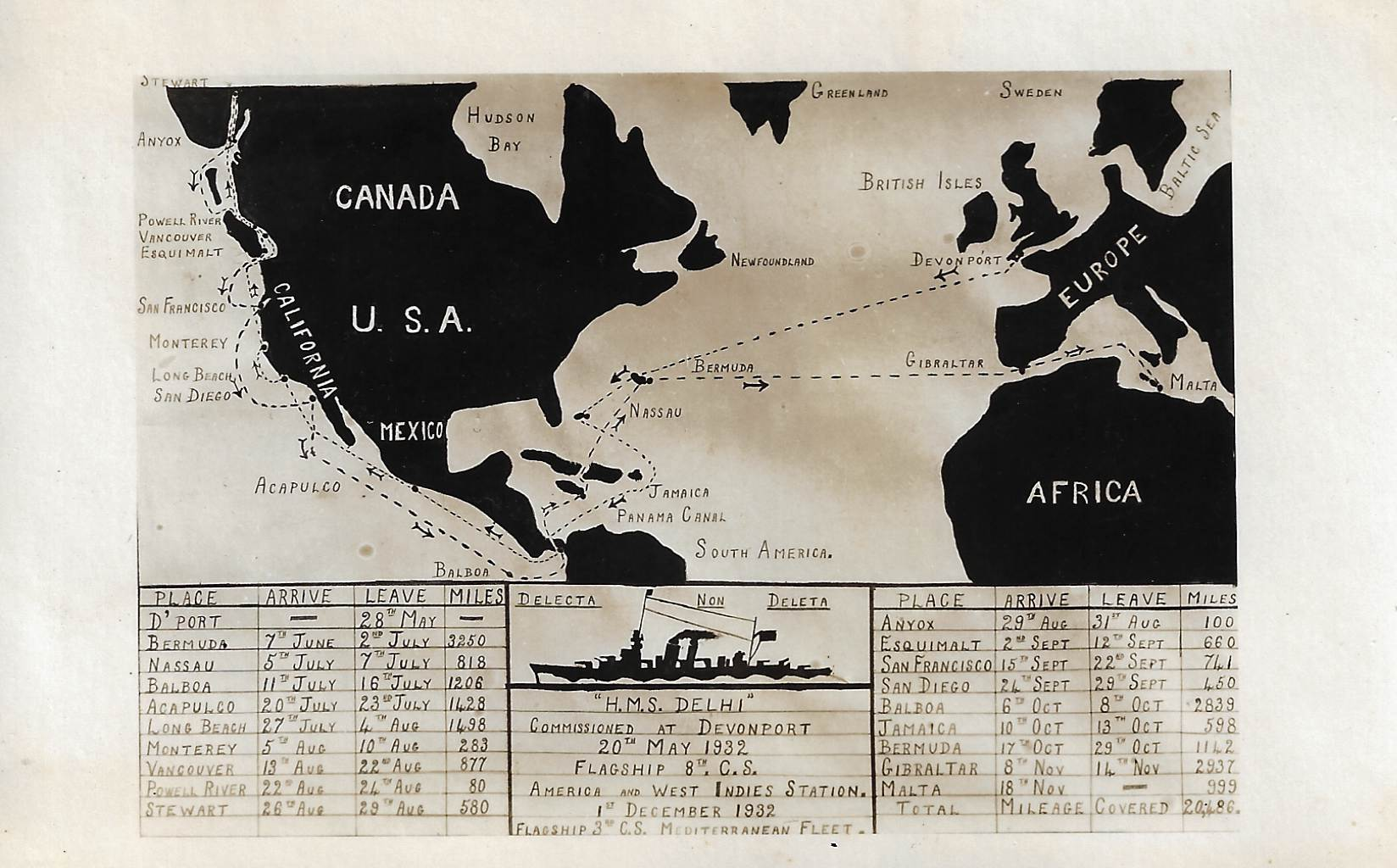
HMS Delhi voyage map, May 1932

Based at Malta at this time, with the Spanish Civil War raging, Delhi operated off Spain, picking up refugees from Palma de Mallorca, Barcelona and Valencia, under the command of Captain Farquhar Smith RAN. During these operations, she was engaged by the Nationalist heavy cruiser Canarias, coming under heavy fire, as well as suffering from aerial attacks.

When World War II began, Delhi was freshly out of reserve, and joined the 11th Cruiser Squadron at Scapa Flow. On the night of the sinking of HMS Royal Oak, Delhi had just departed for a periodic sweep of the North Sea to enforce the blockade of Germany. While patrolling the Iceland-Faroes Gap, Delhi captured the cargo ship Rheingold, and then intercepted and assisted in the scuttling of the blockade-runner Mecklenburg, whose crew scuttled the merchant ship, and abandoned ship. Delhi's captain decided that boarding to attempt to salvage the ship was impractical due to the sea state, and instead sank Mecklenburg with gunfire.

Sortieing from Scapa Flow on patrol on 23 November 1939, she joined the cruisers Caledon, Cardiff, Newcastle and the armed merchant cruiser Rawalpindi. During this patrol, Rawalpindi encountered the German battleships Scharnhorst and Gneisenau, and was sunk in a furious hour-long surface action. However, with Newcastle and Delhi shadowing and the rapid approach of heavy units of the Home Fleet, Admiral Marschall withdrew his battleships into inclement weather, slipping his pursuers and retreating to Wilhelmshaven.

Deployed to the Mediterranean in March 1940, Delhi undertook extensive operations as part of Force H against Vichy and Italian forces in Italy and North Africa. After five months service in the Mediterranean, she joined Force M at Freetown, operating off West Africa and in the South Atlantic. Delhi and her sister ship Dragon participated in Operation Menace, the Battle of Dakar, and then continued in the trade protection role in the South Atlantic.

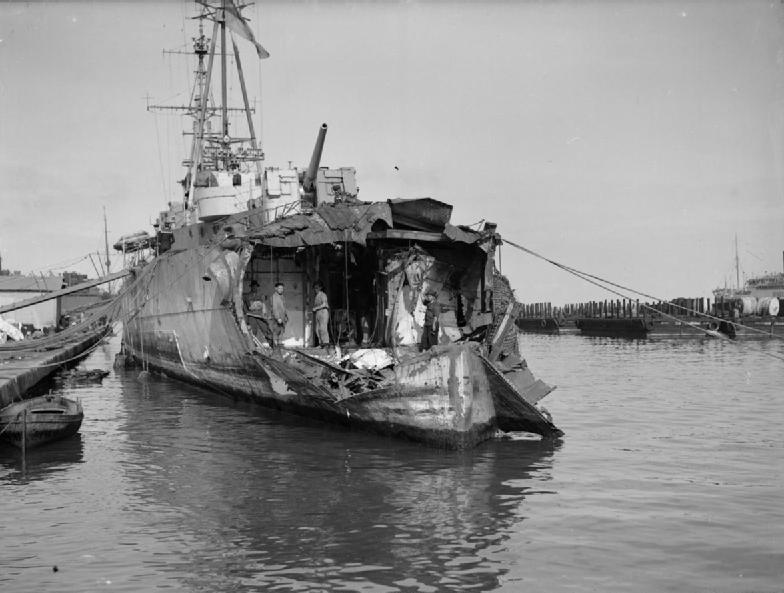
Bomb damage to the stern of HMS Delhi during operations in North Africa

From May to December, 1941 Delhi was refitted as an anti-aircraft cruiser at the Brooklyn Navy Yard. This refit included 5-inch/38 calibre guns originally intended for the US destroyer USS Edison, and were hand-picked by Edison's commanding officer, but were transferred to Delhi on the direct instructions President Roosevelt. With her new dual purpose main armament, she provided shore bombardment and AA support for a number of Allied landings in the Mediterranean, (Algiers, Sicily, Salerno and the Anzio Landings). On 20 November 1942 Delhi was damaged by enemy action in Algiers Bay when her stern was blown open by a bomb dropped by Italian aircraft. Two crewmen were killed in the attack. She returned to Britain and was under repair until April 1943.

On 3 September 1943, six days before the Landings at Salerno, she collided with the cruiser Uganda in the Straits of Messina whilst laying a smokescreen. She was repaired at sea and remained in service for the landings where she provided shore bombardment and AA support. Continuing to serve through the rest of the war, Delhi took part in Operation Dragoon, a follow-up to D-Day in the South of France to utilise Free French troops and to open new supply routes to Allied forces in Europe.

On 12 February 1945 she was attacked by German explosive motorboats in the harbour at Split, Croatia, where she had, three months beforehand, hosted the German surrender. The attack missed Delhi and struck LCF-8, a Landing Craft Flak. The force of the resulting explosion damaged Delhi's rudder and a propeller shaft bracket.

== Anti-aircraft involvement ==
The British HACS and FKS anti-aircraft fire control systems were less than satisfactory in service during World War II. While Delhi was in refit the British asked that the U.S. Navy's MK 37 Gun Fire Control System be installed as a test bed along with the 5-inch/38 calibre guns. The results were most impressive to the service and a request was issued for 42 of the systems to be sent to the Royal Navy for installation on their ships. They would see service in HMS Vanguard, aircraft carriers, and the Battle-class destroyers. The resulting installations were carried out and a further 40 units were asked for. The war ended before the second order could be filled. Delhi's contribution in this area was thus substantial.

== Disposal ==
Delhi returned to Britain and was laid up after the war. She was assessed as uneconomic to fully repair as an aged design in a rapidly downsizing Royal Navy, and was instead sold on 22 January 1948 to be broken up. She arrived at the yards of Cashmore, of Newport, Wales in April 1948 to be scrapped.

== Publications ==
- Bennett, Geoffrey (2002). Freeing the Baltic. Birlinn. ISBN 1-84341-001-X.
- Campbell, N.J.M. (1980). "Great Britain". In Chesneau, Roger (ed.). Conway's All the World's Fighting Ships 1922–1946. Mayflower Books. pp. 2–85. ISBN 0-8317-0303-2.
- Colledge, J. J.; Warlow, Ben (2006) [1969]. Ships of the Royal Navy: The Complete Record of All Fighting Ships of the Royal Navy from the 15th Century to the Present (3rd Rev ed.). London: Chatham Publishing. ISBN 978-1-86176-281-8. OCLC 67375475.
- Freivogel, Zvonimir (2003). "The Attack on HMS Delhi at Spalato". Warship International. XL (2): 157–174. ISSN 0043-0374.
- Friedman, Norman (2010). British Cruisers: Two World Wars and After. Seaforth Publishing. ISBN 978-1-59114-078-8.
- Raven, Alan & Roberts, John (1980). British Cruisers of World War Two. Naval Institute Press. ISBN 0-87021-922-7.
- Rohwer, Jürgen (2005). Chronology of the War at Sea 1939–1945: The Naval History of World War Two (Third Revised ed.). Naval Institute Press. ISBN 1-59114-119-2.
- Whitley, M. J. (1995). Cruisers of World War Two: An International Encyclopedia. Cassell. ISBN 1-86019-874-0.
