= Renown-class battlecruiser =

Battlecruisers built during the First World War

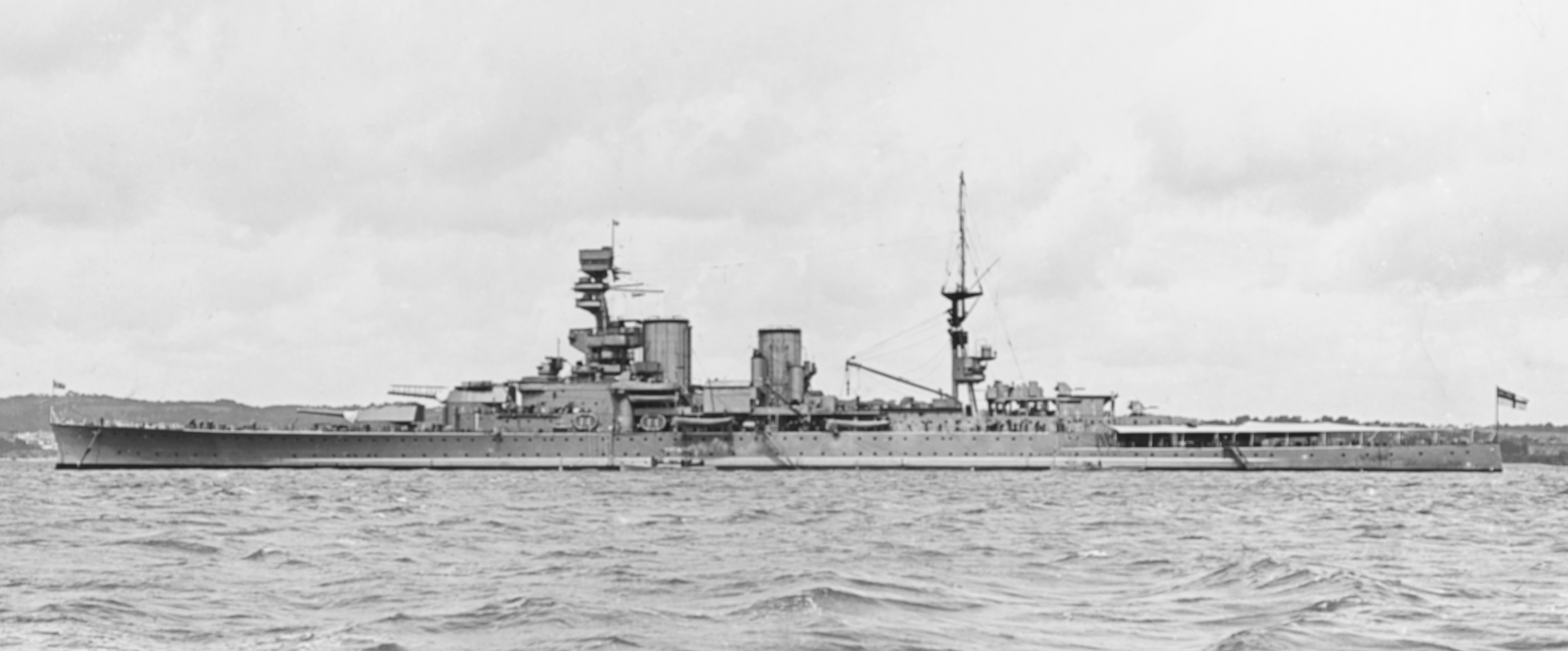
- Renown circa 1920’s

Class overview
- Name: Renown class
- Builders: Fairfields; John Brown
- Operators: (United Kingdom)
- Preceded by: HMS Tiger
- Succeeded by: Courageous class
- Built: 1915–1916
- In service: 1916–1945
- Planned: 2
- Completed: 2
- Lost: 1
- Scrapped: 1

General characteristics (Repulse as built)
- Type: Battlecruiser
- Displacement: 27,200 long tons (27,600 t) (normal)
- Length: 794 ft 1.5 in (242.0 m) (o.a.)
- Beam: 90 ft 1.75 in (27.5 m)
- Draught: 27 ft (8.2 m)
- Installed power: 42 × water-tube boilers; 112,000 shp (84,000 kW)
- Propulsion: 4 × shafts; 2 × geared steam turbine sets
- Speed: 32 knots (59 km/h; 37 mph)
- Range: 4,000 nmi (7,400 km; 4,600 mi) at 18 knots (33 km/h; 21 mph)
- Crew: 953
- Armament: 3 × twin 15 in (381 mm) guns; 5 × triple, 2 × single 4 in (102 mm) guns; 2 × single 3 in (76 mm) AA guns; 2 × 21 in (533 mm) torpedo tubes
- Armour: Belt: 3–6 in (76–152 mm); Decks: 1–2.5 in (25–64 mm); Barbettes: 4–7 in (102–178 mm); Gun turrets: 7–9 in (178–229 mm)

The Renown class consisted of two battlecruisers built during the First World War for the Royal Navy, Renown and Repulse. They were originally laid down as improved versions of the Revenge-class battleships, but their construction was suspended on the outbreak of war on the grounds they would not be ready in a timely manner. Admiral Lord Fisher, upon becoming First Sea Lord, gained approval to restart their construction as battlecruisers that could be built and enter service quickly. The Director of Naval Construction (DNC), Eustace Tennyson-d'Eyncourt, quickly produced an entirely new design to meet Admiral Lord Fisher's requirements and the builders agreed to deliver the ships in 15 months. They did not quite meet that ambitious goal, but they were delivered a few months after the Battle of Jutland in 1916. They were the world's fastest capital ships upon their commissioning.

Repulse was the only ship of her class to see combat in the First World War when she participated in the Second Battle of Heligoland Bight in 1917. Both ships were reconstructed twice between the wars; the 1920s reconstruction increased their armour protection and made lesser improvements, while the 1930s reconstruction was much more thorough, especially for Renown. Repulse accompanied the battlecruiser Hood during the Special Service Squadron's round-the-world cruise in 1923–1924 and protected British interests during the Spanish Civil War between 1936 and 1939. Renown frequently conveyed royalty on their foreign tours and served as flagship of the Battlecruiser Squadron when Hood was refitting.

Both ships served during the Second World War; they searched for the Admiral Graf Spee in 1939, participated in the Norwegian Campaign of April–June 1940 and searched for the Bismarck in 1941. Repulse was sunk on 10 December 1941 in the South China Sea off Kuantan, Pahang, by Japanese aircraft. Renown spent much of 1940 and 1941 assigned to Force H at Gibraltar, escorting convoys and she fought in the inconclusive Battle of Cape Spartivento. She was briefly assigned to the Home Fleet and provided cover to several Arctic convoys in early 1942. The ship was transferred back to Force H for Operation Torch and spent much of 1943 refitting or transporting Winston Churchill and his staff to and from various conferences with various Allied leaders. In early 1944 Renown was transferred to the Eastern Fleet in the Indian Ocean where she supported numerous attacks on Japanese-occupied facilities in Indonesia and various island groups in the Indian Ocean. The ship returned to the Home Fleet in early 1945 and was refitted before being placed in reserve after the end of the war. Renown was sold for scrap in 1948.

== Genesis ==
=== Improved Revenge-class battleships ===
The battleships of the 1914 Naval Programme consisted of three improved Revenge-class ships, named Renown, Repulse and Resistance, and one further member of the Queen Elizabeth class, called Agincourt. Resistance and Agincourt were to be built in royal dockyards while Renown was awarded to Fairfield and Repulse to Palmers. The design was approved on 13 May 1914 and the improvements over the Revenge class consisted of:

- A consistent thickness of 1.5 inches (38 mm) for the protective wing bulkheads.
- An enlarged torpedo control tower.
- An enlarged conning tower with the armour rearranged for better access.
- A protected spotting position in the bow.
- The width of the keel was increased to provide a more rigid structure amidships to resist stress while docking.
- Shell stowage for the main guns was increased from 80 rounds per gun to 100.

These changes would have done little to change the size of the ships in comparison to their predecessors other than a decrease in draught to 28 feet 6 inches (8.7 m), 1 foot 6 inches (45.7 cm) less than the older ships. They would, however, have been 2 knots (3.7 km/h; 2.3 mph) slower than the Revenge-class ships as they were to be provided with only 31,000 shaft horsepower (23,000 kW) rather than the 40,000 shp (30,000 kW) of their predecessors.

Work on all four ships was suspended at the beginning of the First World War and the two ships to be built in the royal dockyards were cancelled on 26 August 1914, as it was believed that they could not be completed before the end of the war. Admiral Lord Fisher, once he returned to office as First Sea Lord in October, began pressuring Winston Churchill, then First Lord of the Admiralty, to allow him to convert the suspended contracts for Renown and Repulse into a new class of battlecruisers capable of the very high speed of 32 knots (59 km/h; 37 mph). Churchill argued that their construction would interfere with other construction programmes, absorb too many resources, and still could not be finished in time. Fisher countered by arguing he could keep the building time to a minimum, as he had done with Dreadnought, by using as much material ordered for the battleships as possible, including their 15-inch (381 mm) gun turrets. Churchill was unmoved, however, until the experiences of Battle of Heligoland Bight in August and the Battle of the Falkland Islands in December, seemed to demonstrate that high speed and heavy gun power was a potent combination and vindicated Fisher's long-held belief on the viability of the battlecruiser. These actions, plus pressure from Admiral Jellicoe, commander of the Grand Fleet, and Vice Admiral Beatty, commander of the Battlecruiser Force, caused Churchill to gain approval from the Cabinet to build two ships on 28 December.

=== Battlecruisers ===
Admiral Lord Fisher first presented his requirements for the new ships to the DNC on 18 December, before they had even been approved. He wanted a long, high, flared bow, like that on the pre-dreadnought HMS Renown, but higher, four 15-inch guns in two twin turrets, an anti-torpedo boat armament of twenty 4-inch (102 mm) guns mounted high up and protected by gun shields only, speed of 32 knots using oil fuel, and armour on the scale of the battlecruiser Indefatigable. Within a few days, however, Fisher increased the number of guns to six and added two torpedo tubes. Minor revisions in the initial estimate were made until 26 December, and a preliminary design was completed on 30 December.

During the following week the DNC's department examined the material delivered for the two battleships and decided what could be used in the new design and the contract for Repulse was transferred from Palmers to John Brown & Company because the former lacked a slipway long enough to use for the new ship. The usable material was transferred to John Brown and both builders had received enough information from the DNC's department to lay the keels of both ships on 25 January 1915, (Note: Burt states that the first twelve plates were laid down for Repulse on 30 November 1914, but this is not mentioned in any other source. See Burt 1986, p. 291.) well before the altered contracts were completed on 10 March

== Description ==
=== General characteristics ===
The Renown-class ships had an overall length of 794 feet 1.5 inches (242.0 m), a beam of 90 feet 1.75 inches (27.5 m), and a draught of 30 feet 2 inches (9.2 m) at deep load. They displaced 27,320 long tons (27,760 t) at standard load and 32,220 long tons (32,740 t) at deep load. While 90 feet (27.4 m) longer than their predecessor, Tiger, they displaced 2,780 long tons (2,820 t) less than the older ship at deep load.

The ships proved to be good sea boats, but had to be reinforced while under construction with additional stiffening and pillars under the forecastle deck to cure some minor structural problems forward. They had a metacentric height of 6.2 feet (1.9 m) at deep load as built as well as a complete double bottom.

=== Propulsion ===
The original plan for these ships was to use lightweight machinery producing a total of 110,000 shaft horsepower (82,000 kW), but that would have required a considerable amount of time to complete its design. Rather than risk delaying the completion of the ships the machinery from HMS Tiger was duplicated with the addition of three extra boilers to provide the required power needed for the additional speed. Each ship had two paired sets of Brown-Curtis direct-drive steam turbines, housed in separate engine-rooms. Each set comprised high-pressure ahead and astern turbines driving an outboard shaft and low-pressure ahead and astern turbines, housed in the same casing, driving an inner shaft. Their three-bladed propellers were 13 feet 6 inches (4.11 m) in diameter. The turbines were powered by 42 Babcock & Wilcox water-tube boilers in six boiler rooms at a working pressure of 235 psi (1,620 kPa; 17 kgf/cm^{2}). They were designed to produce a total of 112,000 shaft horsepower (84,000 kW), but achieved more than 126,000 shp (93,958 kW) during Renown's trials, when she reached a speed of 32.58 knots (60.34 km/h; 37.49 mph). They were the fastest capital ships in existence until the arrival of Hood in 1920.

They were designed to normally carry 1,000 long tons (1,016 t) of fuel oil, but had a maximum capacity of 4,289 long tons (4,358 t). At full capacity, the Renown-class ships could steam at a speed of 18 knots (33 km/h; 21 mph) for 4,000 nautical miles (7,410 km; 4,600 mi). The ships had two reciprocating steam-driven 200-kilowatt (270 hp) dynamos, one oil-driven 150-kilowatt (200 hp) dynamo, and one turbine-driven 200-kilowatt (270 hp) dynamo that supplied the common ring main at 220 volts.

=== Armament ===
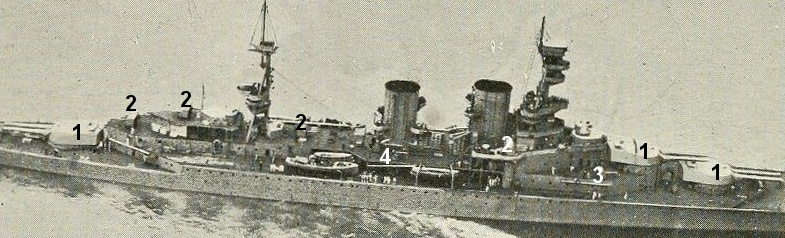
Aerial view of Repulse in 1918.: 1. twin 15-inch turrets; 2. triple 4-inch mountings; 3. starboard single 4-inch mounting; 4. starboard single 3-inch AA mounting

The Renown-class ships mounted six 42-calibre BL 15-inch Mk I guns in three twin hydraulically powered gun turrets, designated "A", "B", and "Y" from front to rear. The guns could be depressed to −3° and elevated to 20°; they could be loaded at any angle up to 20°, although loading at high angles tended to slow the gun's return to battery (firing position). The ships carried 120 shells per gun. They fired 1,910-pound (866 kg) projectiles at a muzzle velocity of 2,575 ft/s (785 m/s); this provided a maximum range of 23,734 yd (21,702 m) with armour-piercing shells.

The ships were designed with seventeen 45-calibre BL 4-inch Mark IX guns, fitted in five triple and two single mounts. These were manually powered and quite cumbersome in use as they required a crew of thirty-two men to load and train the triple gun mounts. The gun's rate of fire was only 10 to 12 rounds per minute as the loaders kept getting in each other's way. They had a maximum depression of −10° and a maximum elevation of 30°. They fired a 31-pound (14 kg) high-explosive shell at a muzzle velocity of 2,625 ft/s (800 m/s). At maximum elevation the guns had a maximum range of 13,500 yards (12,344 m). The ships carried 200 rounds for each gun.

Each ship mounted a pair of QF 3 inch 20 cwt (Note: "cwt" is the abbreviation for hundredweight, 20 cwt referring to the weight of the gun.) anti-aircraft guns on single high-angle mountings. These were mounted on the shelter deck abreast the rear funnel. The gun had a maximum depression of 10° and a maximum elevation of 90°. It fired a 12.5-pound (5.7 kg) shell at a muzzle velocity of 2,500 ft/s (760 m/s) at a rate of fire of 12–14 rounds per minute. They had a maximum effective ceiling of 23,500 ft (7,200 m). Both ships carried ten torpedoes and mounted two 21-inch (533 mm) submerged torpedo tubes fitted just forward of "A" barbette.

=== Fire control ===
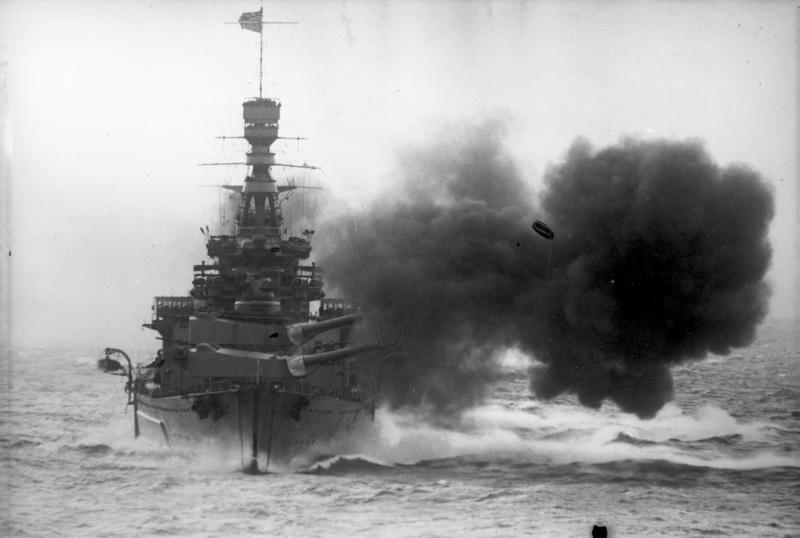
Repulse firing in 1929

The main guns of the Renown-class ships could be controlled from either of the two fire-control directors. The primary director was mounted above the conning tower in an armoured hood and the other was in the fore-top on the foremast. Data from a rangefinder in the armoured hood was input into a Mk IV* Dreyer Fire Control Table located in the Transmitting Station (TS) where it was converted into range and deflection data for use by the guns. The target's data was also graphically recorded on a plotting table to assist the gunnery officer in predicting the movement of the target. The secondary armament was controlled by directors mounted on platforms on each mast. Each turret was provided with a 15-foot (4.6 m) rangefinder in an armoured housing on the turret roof.

During the war the number and size of rangefinders increased. By 1918 Renown carried two 30-foot (9.1 m) rangefinders, one on "Y" turret and the other in the armoured hood above the conning tower. Fifteen-foot rangefinders were mounted on "A" and "B" turrets, the torpedo control tower abaft the mainmast, and the armoured hood. The fore-top was equipped with a 12-foot (3.7 m) rangefinder and the anti-aircraft guns were controlled by a simple 6-foot-6-inch (1.98 m) rangefinder mounted on the aft superstructure. Two 9-foot (2.7 m) rangefinders were mounted on the bridge.

=== Armour ===
The armour protection of the Renown-class ships was similar to that of Indefatigable; her waterline belt of Krupp cemented armour measured 6 inches (152 mm) thick amidships. It ran from the midpoint of "A" barbette to the midpoint of "Y" barbette, a length of 462 feet (140.8 m), and was 9 feet (2.7 m) high. Strakes of three-inch armour aft and four-inch armour forward continued the belt towards the ends of the ship, although neither reached the bow or the stern. The strakes were enclosed by transverse bulkheads of the same thickness. For much of the length of the main belt there was an upper belt of high-tensile steel, 1.5 inches (38 mm) thick, intended as splinter protection.

The gun turrets were 9 inches (229 mm) thick on the face and front sides, 7 inches (178 mm) thick on the rear side plates while their roofs were 4.25 inches (108 mm) thick. The barbettes were protected by 7 inches (178 mm) of armour above the upper deck, but it thinned to 4–5 inches (102–127 mm) below the deck. The conning tower sides were 10 inches (254 mm) thick and it had a three-inch roof. The walls of the communication tube were three inches thick. The torpedo control tower had 3-inch walls and a 1.5-inch cast steel roof.

As designed the high-tensile-steel decks ranged from 0.75 to 1.5 inches (19 to 38 mm) in thickness. After the Battle of Jutland in 1916, while the ships were still completing, an extra inch of high-tensile steel was added on the main deck over the magazines. Despite these additions, the ships were still felt to be too vulnerable to plunging fire and each ship was refitted in Rosyth in 1916–1917 with additional horizontal armour, weighing approximately 504 long tons (512 t), added to the decks over the magazines and over the steering mechanism.

The Renown-class ships were fitted with a shallow anti-torpedo bulge integral to the hull which was intended to explode the torpedo before it hit the hull proper and vent the underwater explosion to the surface rather than into the ship. However, later testing proved that it was not deep enough to accomplish its task as it lacked the layers of empty and full compartments that were necessary to absorb the force of the explosion.

== Ships ==
Name	Builder	Laid down	Launched	Commissioned	Fate
Renown	Fairfield, Govan	25 January 1915	4 March 1916	20 September 1916	Broken up at Faslane, 1948
Repulse	John Brown, Clydebank	25 January 1915	8 January 1916	18 August 1916	Sunk in air attack near off Kuantan, 10 December 1941

== Service ==
=== First World War ===
Both ships spent much of the remainder of 1916 and early 1917 in the hands of dockyards having their armour upgraded and conducting routine patrols of the North Sea. They were assigned to the 1st Battlecruiser Squadron (BCS) for the duration of the war. Repulse relieved Lion as flagship of the 1st BCS.

==== Second Battle of Heligoland Bight ====
Over the course of 1917 the Admiralty became more concerned about German efforts in the North Sea to sweep paths through the British-laid minefields intended to restrict the actions of the High Seas Fleet and German submarines. A preliminary raid on German minesweeping forces on 31 October by light forces destroyed ten small ships and the Admiralty decided on a larger operation to destroy the minesweepers and their escorting light cruisers. Based on intelligence reports the Admiralty decided on 17 November 1917 to allocate two light cruiser squadrons, the 1st Cruiser Squadron covered by the reinforced 1st BCS (less Renown) and, more distantly, the battleships of the 1st Battle Squadron to the operation.

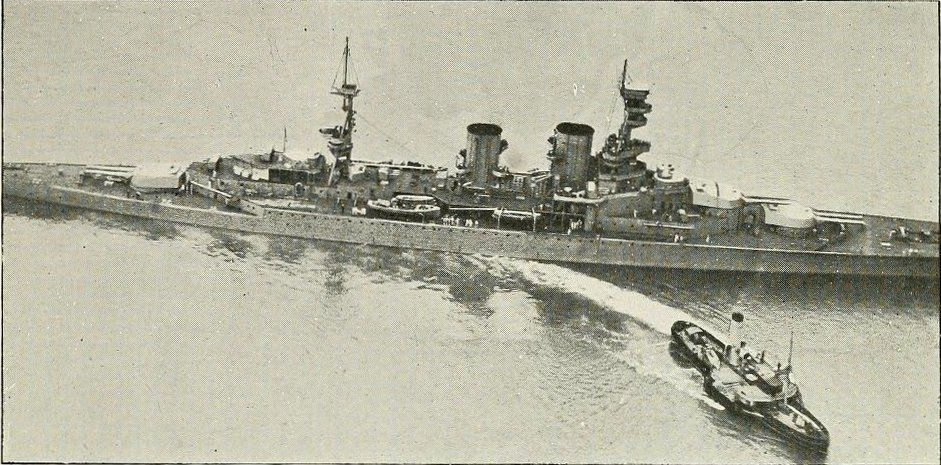
Repulse in August 1918

The German ships, four light cruisers of II Scouting Force, eight destroyers, three divisions of minesweepers, eight sperrbrechers (cork-filled trawlers, used to detonate mines without sinking) and two trawlers to mark the swept route, were spotted at 7:30 a.m., (Note: The times used in this article are in UTC, which is one hour behind CET, which is often used in German works.) silhouetted by the rising sun. The light battlecruiser Courageous and the light cruiser Cardiff opened fire with their forward guns seven minutes later. The Germans responded by laying an effective smoke screen. The British continued in pursuit, but lost track of most of the smaller ships in the smoke and concentrated fire on the light cruisers as opportunity permitted. Repulse was detached not long after and raced forward at full speed to engage the enemy ships. She opened fire at about 9:00, scoring a single hit on the light cruiser SMS Königsberg during the battle. When the German battleships SMS Kaiser and SMS Kaiserin were spotted about 9:50 the British broke off their pursuit and Repulse covered their retreat, aided by a heavy fog that came down around 10:40.

In September 1917 Repulse became the first capital ship to be fitted with aircraft flying-off platforms on her turrets. A Sopwith Pup successfully took off from the platform mounted on "B" turret on 1 October and repeated his achievement on 9 October from "Y" turret. Renown received her platforms in early 1918.

On 12 December 1917 Renown put to sea with other elements of the fleet in an unsuccessful attempt to intercept the German 3rd Half-Flotilla of destroyers that had destroyed the Scandinavian convoy and most of its escorts. For the rest of the war the two ships patrolled the North Sea uneventfully. Both ships were present at the surrender of the High Seas Fleet at Scapa Flow on 21 November 1918.

=== Inter-war service ===
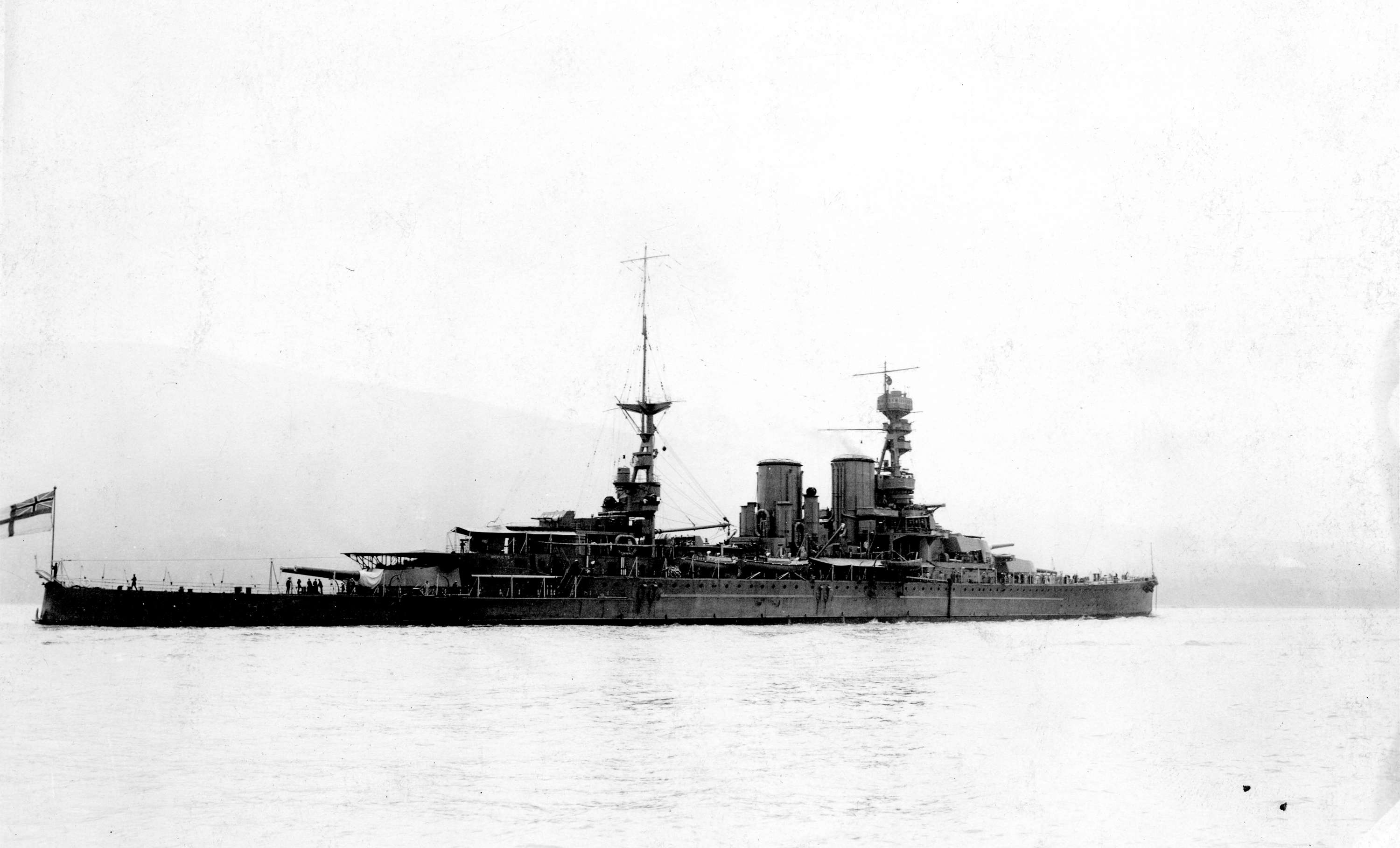
Repulse moored at Vancouver during her 1923–1924 world cruise.

Repulse began a major refit at Portsmouth on 17 December 1918 intended to drastically improve her armour protection. Her existing 6-inch armour belt was replaced by 9-inch (229 mm) armour plates made surplus by the conversion of the battleship Almirante Cochrane (originally ordered by Chile and purchased after the war began) to the aircraft carrier Eagle. The old armour was fitted between the main and upper decks, above the new armour belt. Additional high-tensile plating was added to the decks over the magazines. The ship's anti-torpedo bulge was deepened and reworked along the lines of that installed on the battleship Ramillies. The bulge covered her hull from the submerged torpedo room to "Y" magazine and the inner compartments of which were filled with crushing tubes. The bulges added 12 feet 8 inches (3.9 m) to her beam and 1 foot 4 inches (0.4 m) to her draught. The refit added about 4,500 long tons (4,600 t) to her displacement and raised her metacentric height to 6.4 feet (2.0 m) at deep load. Three 30-foot rangefinders were also added as well as eight torpedo tubes in twin mounts on the upper deck. Both flying-off platforms were removed.

When the Grand Fleet was disbanded in April 1919 Renown was assigned to the Battlecruiser Squadron of the Atlantic Fleet. In June she was refitted in preparation for a tour of Canada, Newfoundland and the United States by Edward, the Prince of Wales, and both flying-off platforms were removed. From January to March 1920 Renown was refitted more extensively as a "royal yacht". Her aft 4-inch mounting and both 3-inch AA guns were removed so that extra accommodation and a promenade deck could be built. A large deckhouse was built on the shelter deck between the funnels. The port side housed a squash court while the starboard side was a cinema. The ship sailed in March for Australia and New Zealand with the Prince of Wales and his entourage aboard and made many stops en route. She returned to Portsmouth in October and was placed in reserve in November.

Renown was recommissioned in September 1921 for a tour of India and Japan by the Prince of Wales and sailed from Portsmouth in October. The ship arrived back in Portsmouth in June 1922 and she was placed in reserve the following month. The ship began a reconstruction that same month along the lines of her sister, although changes were made based on the experiences with Repulse. Renown's main armour belt was removed and a new 9-inch belt was installed, using up the remaining plates left over from Almirante Cochrane as well as new armour, but installed about 3 feet (0.9 m) higher than on Repulse to offset any increase in draught. A strake of tapered armour was fitted underneath the main belt to deflect any shell that dived beneath the water's surface; it was 9-inches thick at top and thinned to 2 inches (51 mm) at the bottom. The ship's deck armour was heavily reinforced adjacent to its machinery spaces and magazines. Two longitudinal bulkheads were added between the upper and main decks that ran from the base of the conning tower to the end of the boiler rooms. The bulges were reworked and based on those used in the Queen Elizabeth-class battleships, although crushing tubes were only used abreast the magazines. The rear triple 4-inch gun mount was replaced. The flying-off platform on "B" turret was reinstated and a high-angle control position (HACP) was added to the fore-top. The pair of 3-inch AA guns and her two single four-inch gun mounts were removed and replaced with four QF four-inch Mark V anti-aircraft guns. They had a maximum depression of -5° and a maximum elevation of 80°. They fired a 31-pound (14 kg) high explosive shell at a muzzle velocity of 2,387 ft/s (728 m/s) at a rate of ten to fifteen rounds per minute. The guns had a maximum ceiling of 31,000 ft (9,400 m), but an effective range of much less. The reconstruction only added 3,500 long tons (3,600 t) to the ship's displacement and three inches to her draught.

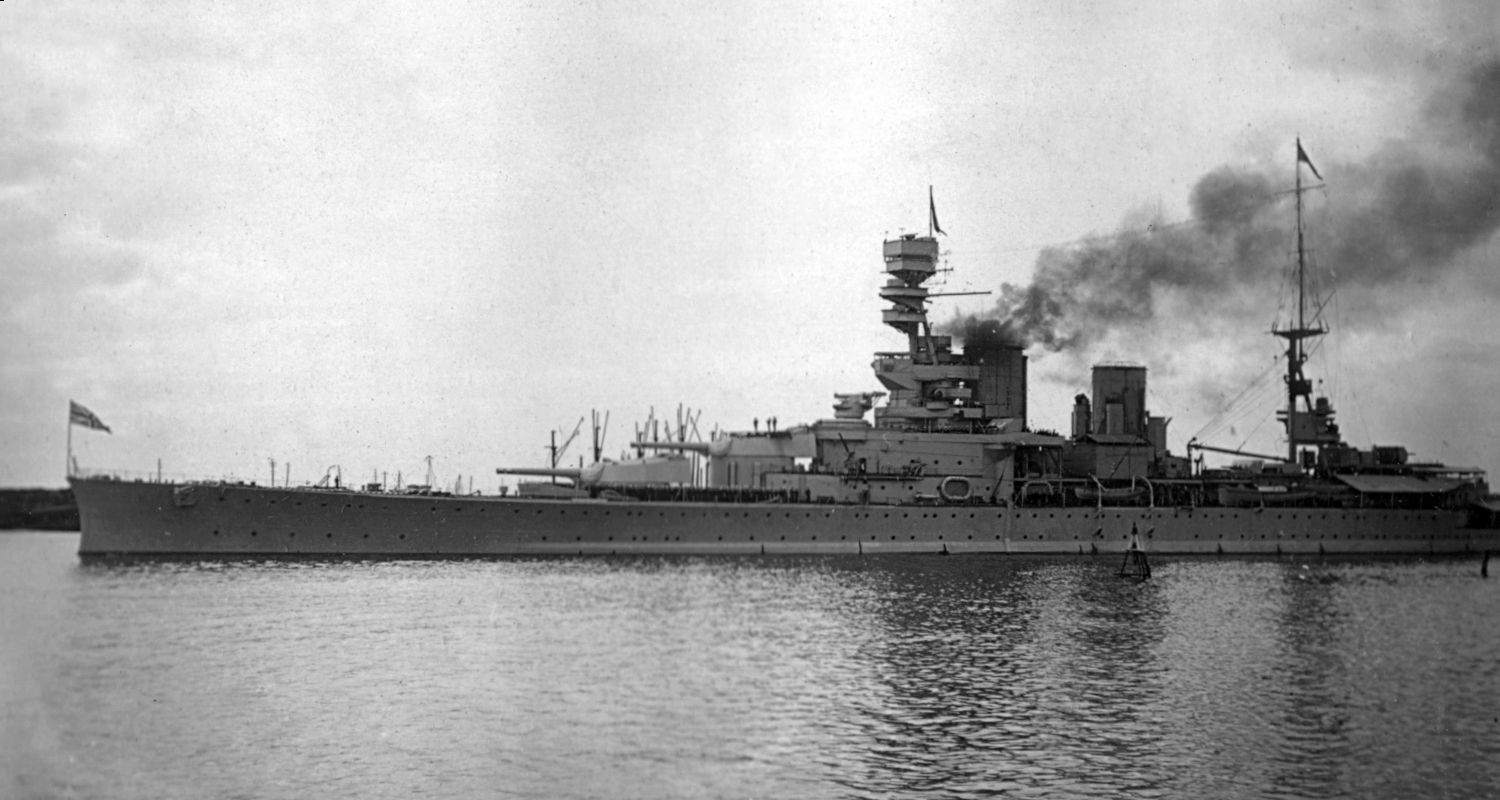
Renown at Fremantle during her 1927 cruise to Australia

Repulse was recommissioned on 1 January 1921 and joined the Battlecruiser Squadron. In November 1923, Hood, accompanied by Repulse and a number of Danae-class cruisers of the 1st Light Cruiser Squadron, set out on a world cruise from west to east via the Panama Canal. They returned home ten months later in September 1924. Shortly after her return the ship's pair of 3-inch AA guns and her two single four-inch gun mounts were removed and replaced with four QF four-inch Mark V AA guns. The Battlecruiser Squadron visited Lisbon in February 1925 to participate in the Vasco da Gama celebrations before continuing on the Mediterranean for exercises. A squash court was added on the starboard side between the funnels for the Prince of Wales' tour of Africa and South America that lasted from March to October. Upon her return she was refitted from November 1925 to July 1926 and had a HACP added to her fore-top.

Renown finished her reconstruction in September 1926 and she was assigned to the Battlecruiser Squadron until the ship was detached to convey Prince Albert of York to Australia between January and July 1927. Upon her return she rejoined the Atlantic Fleet. Renown became the flagship of the BCS when Hood was refitting between 1929 and 1931. Hood reassumed the role as flagship after she was recommissioned and Renown was paid off for a refit of her own. A High-Angle Control System Mark I was fitted with a director on the roof of the fore-top that replaced the high-angle rangefinder and the conning tower platform was enlarged to accommodate a pair of Mk V octuple mountings for the QF 2-pounder Mk VIII gun The Mk V mounts could depress to −10° and elevate to a maximum of 80°. The Mark VIII 2-pounder gun fired a 40-millimetre (1.6 in) .91-pound (0.41 kg) shell at a muzzle velocity of 1,920 ft/s (590 m/s) to a distance of 3,800 yards (3,500 m). The gun's rate of fire was approximately 96–98 rounds per minute. Only one mount was initially available, however, and it, along with its director, was fitted on the starboard side. Renown had her midships triple 4-inch mount removed to make room for an aircraft catapult that was not fitted until 1933. The port Mark V 2-pounder mount was finally fitted, albeit without its director, that same year. The ship now carried a Fairey III floatplane for reconnaissance purposes. The flying-off platform was also removed.

==== 1930s reconstructions ====
After Repulse completed her 1926 refit she remained in commission, aside from a brief refit in July–September 1927, with the BCS of the Atlantic Fleet until she was paid off in June 1932 prior to beginning her reconstruction in April 1933. Most of the existing layers of high-tensile steel that constituted the ship's horizontal armour were replaced by non-cemented armour plates 2.5–3.5 inches (64–89 mm) in thickness and the torpedo control tower was removed from the aft superstructure. A fixed catapult replaced the midships 4-inch triple mount and a hangar was built on each side of the rear funnel to house two of the ship's Fairey III aircraft. One additional aircraft could be carried on the deck and another on the catapult itself. Electric cranes were mounted above each hangar to handle the aircraft. The four 4-inch AA guns were moved, one pair abreast the rear funnel at the level of the hangar roof and the other pair abreast the fore funnel on the forecastle deck. Four prototype QF 4-inch Mark XV dual-purpose guns were added in twin-gun Mark XVIII mounts abreast the mainmast. Two octuple Mark VI 2-pounder mounts were fitted on extensions of the conning-tower platform abreast the fore funnel. Above these a pair of quadruple Mark II* mountings for the 0.5-inch Vickers Mark III machine gun were added. These mounts could depress to −10° and elevate to a maximum of 70°. The machine guns fired a 1.326-ounce (37.6 g) bullet at a muzzle velocity of 2,520 ft/s (770 m/s). This gave the gun a maximum range of about 5,000 yd (4,600 m), although its effective range was only 800 yd (730 m) Repulse received two HACS directors, one Mark II on the fore-top and a Mark I* mounted on a pedestal above the rear superstructure. The two submerged torpedo tubes were removed and the vacant spaces sub-divided and turned into store-rooms.

Renown began her own even more thorough reconstruction in September 1936, based on that of the battleship Warspite. Her superstructure and funnels were razed to the level of the upper deck, her masts taken out and the ship's main and secondary armament was removed. A large splinter-proof tower superstructure was built, topped with a director-control tower for the main armament and two HACS Mark IV directors. The armoured hood formerly mounted above the conning tower was reinstalled on the rear superstructure. The ship's engines and boilers were replaced by Parsons geared turbine sets and eight Admiralty three-drum boilers. This saved some 2,800 long tons (2,800 t) of weight and allowed the two forward boiler rooms to be converted to 4.5-inch (110 mm) magazines and other uses. Renown's deck protection was somewhat upgraded by adding non-cemented armour where it had not been added earlier and protecting the new 4.5-inch magazines. As in Repulse hangars were built abreast her rear funnel and a catapult was fitted between the rear funnel and the aft superstructure.

The ship's 15-inch gun turrets were modified to the Mark I (N) standard with their elevation increased to 30°. Twenty dual-purpose QF 4.5-inch Mark III guns in twin BD Mark II mountings replaced all of the 4-inch guns. Six of the gun turrets, three on each side, were abreast the forward funnel while the remaining four were mounted on abreast the main mast. The BD Mark II mounts had elevation limits of −5° to +80°. The Mark III gun fired a 55-pound (25 kg) high explosive shell at a muzzle velocity of about 2,350 ft/s (720 m/s). Its rate of fire was 12 rounds per minute. They had a maximum effective ceiling of 41,000 ft (12,000 m). The guns were controlled by four dual-purpose Mark IV directors, two mounted on the rear of the bridge structure and the remaining two on the aft superstructure. They fed tracking data to a HACS Mark IV analog computer for high-angle targets and an Admiralty Fire Control Clock Mark VII for low-angle targets. Each gun was provided with 400 round of ammunition. Three octuple Mark VI 2-pounder mounts were fitted, two on a platform between the funnels and the third at the rear of the aft superstructure. Each was provided with a Mark III* director. Four quadruple Vickers .50-calibre Mark III mounts were also added, two each on the forward and rear superstructures. The submerged torpedo tubes were removed and eight above-water torpedo tubes added.

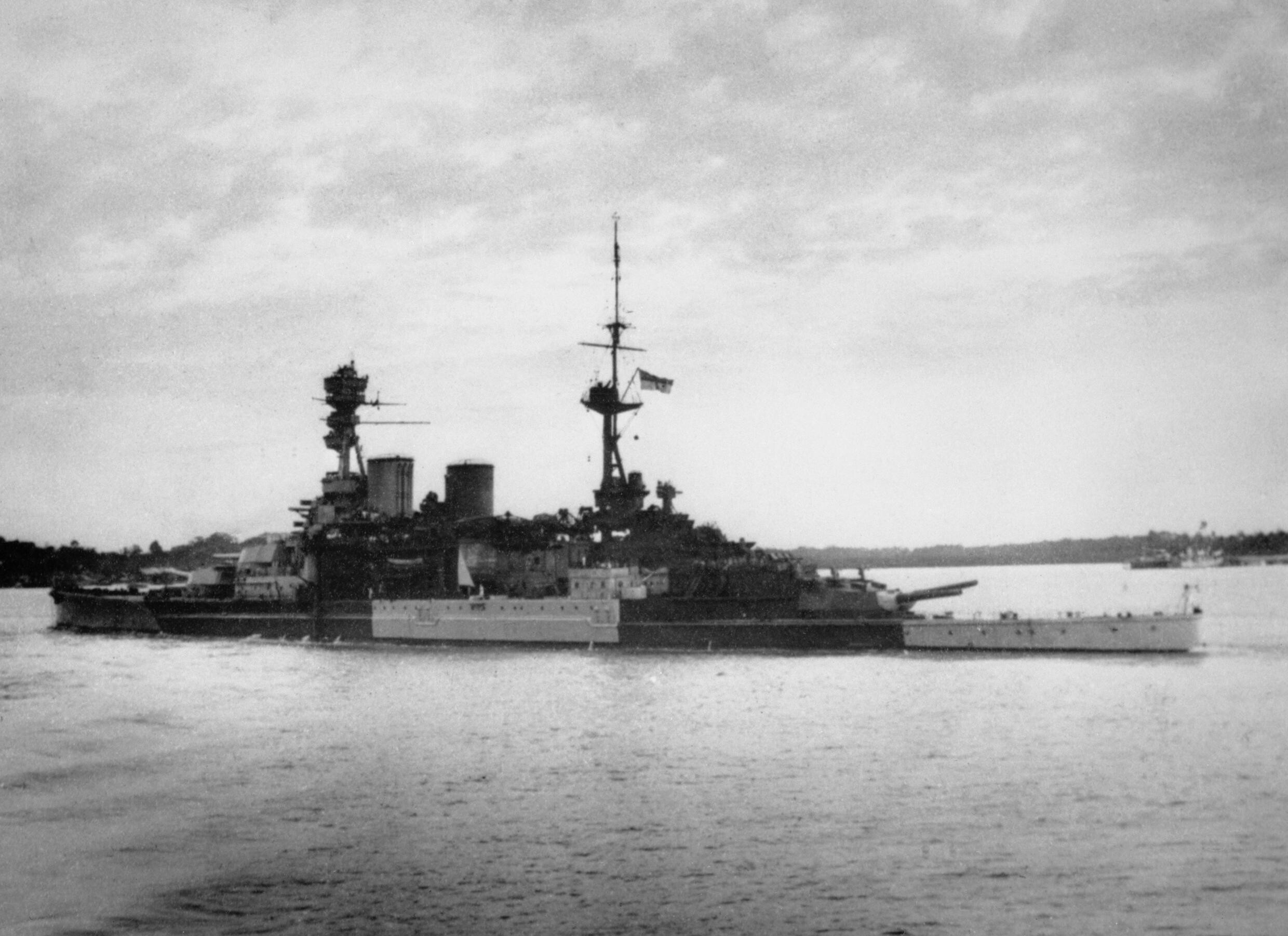
Repulse departing from Singapore on 8 December 1941

Repulse was assigned to the Mediterranean Fleet when she recommissioned in April 1936. She transported 500 refugees from Palma, Majorca, to Marseille, France, in late 1936 after the start of the Spanish Civil War. The ship was present at the Coronation Fleet Review at Spithead on 20 May 1937 for George VI. Repulse was sent to Haifa in July 1938 to maintain order during the Arab Revolt. She was selected to convey the King and Queen during their May 1939 Canadian Tour and she was refitted between October 1938 and March 1939 for this role. The twin 4-inch AA guns were replaced by two more Mark V guns and two additional quadruple .50-calibre mounts were added. The King and Queen ultimately traveled aboard the liner RMS Empress of Australia while Repulse escorted them on the first half of the journey.

=== Second World War ===
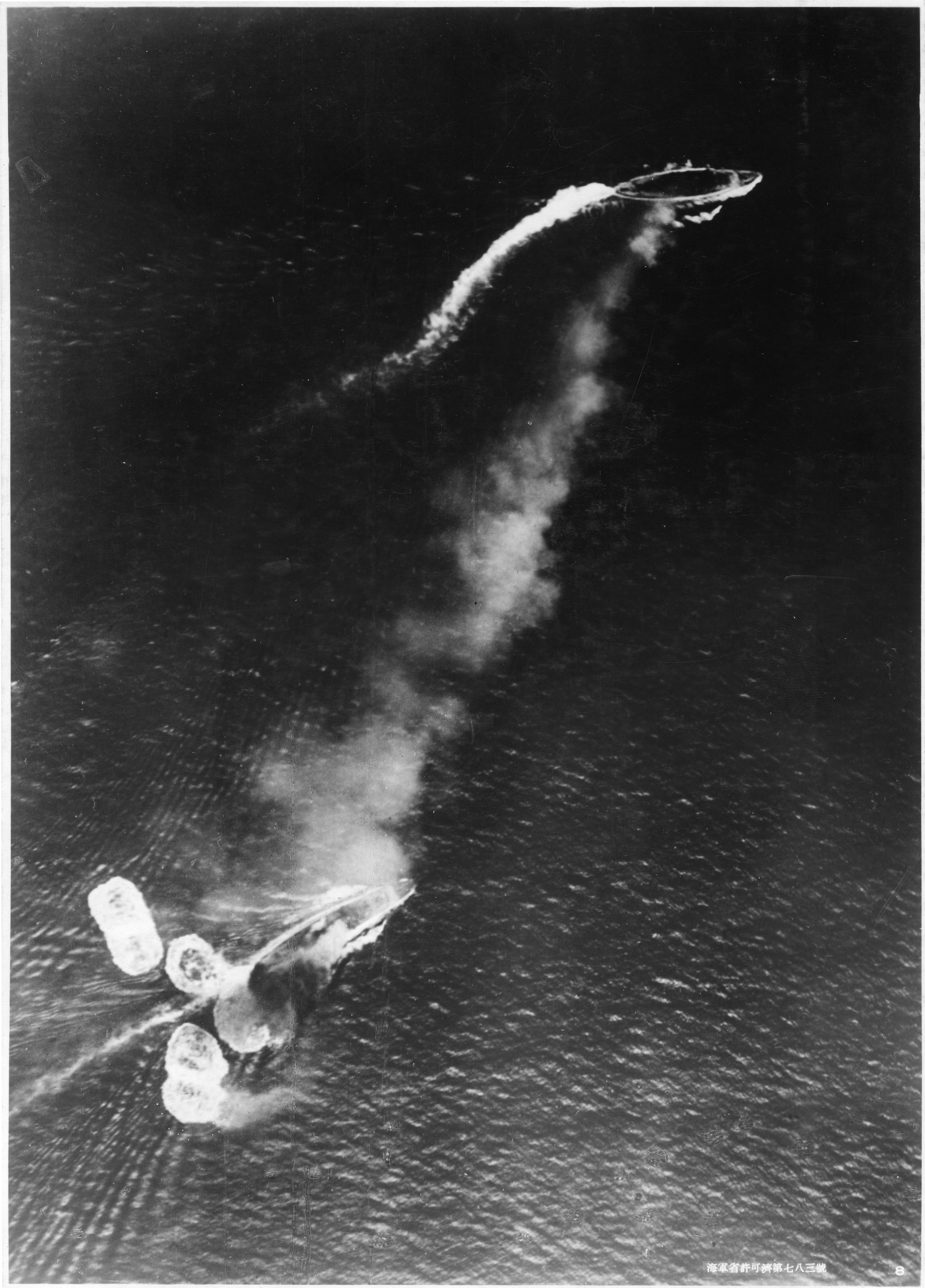
Repulse is at the bottom, having been hit once by a bomb, 10 December 1941

The beginning of the Second World War found Repulse assigned to the Battlecruiser Squadron of the Home Fleet. She patrolled off the Norwegian coast and in the North Sea in search of German ships and to enforce the blockade. Early in the war Repulse had her aft triple 4-inch mount replaced by an 8-barrel 2-pounder mount. In late October she was transferred to Halifax with the aircraft carrier Furious to protect convoys and search for German raiders. She escorted the convoy bringing most of the 1st Canadian Infantry Division to Britain in mid-December 1939 and was reassigned to the Home Fleet. The ship supported Allied operations during the Norwegian Campaign in April–June 1940. Accompanied by Renown and the 1st Cruiser Squadron, Repulse attempted to intercept the Gneisenau as it sailed from Trondheim to Germany in July. Until May 1941 the ship escorted convoys and unsuccessfully searched for German ships. On 22 May Repulse was diverted from escorting Convoy WS8B to assist in the search for the Bismarck, but she had to break off the search early on 25 May as she was running low on fuel. The ship was refitted from June to August and received eight Oerlikon 20-millimetre (0.79 in) autocannon as well as a Type 284 surface gunnery radar. Repulse escorted a troop convoy around the Cape of Good Hope from August to October and was transferred to East Indies Command.

To deter Japanese aggression in the Far East in late 1941, Winston Churchill was determined to send a small group of fast capital ships, along with one modern aircraft carrier, to Singapore. Repulse was already in the Indian Ocean and was ordered to Colombo in November to rendezvous with the battleship Prince of Wales where they would form Force Z. The carrier Indomitable was supposed to join them, but she was delayed when she ran aground while working up in the Caribbean. The two ships, and their escorting destroyers, arrived in Singapore on 2 December. Force Z departed on the evening of 8 December in an attempt to destroy Japanese troop convoys and protect the army's seaward flanks from any Japanese landings in their rear. They were spotted by a Japanese reconnaissance aircraft during the following afternoon and shadowed for the rest of the day. Admiral Sir Tom Phillips decided to cancel the operation as the Japanese were now alerted. Force Z turned back during the evening, but was spotted again early on the morning of 10 December. About four hours later Japanese bombers arrived and attacked Repulse from high altitude; she was slightly damaged by one bomb hit in her port hangar. The second wave consisted of torpedo bombers which missed Repulse, but scored at least one hit on Prince of Wales. The third wave again consisted of high-altitude level bombers that missed Repulse entirely. The fourth wave of torpedo bombers managed to hit Repulse once amidships on her port side. The final wave of torpedo bombers hit Repulse with three more torpedoes and the ship capsized with the loss of 508 officers and men. The sinking of Prince of Wales and Repulse contributed to the rapid fall of Singapore and Malaya to the Japanese, and demonstrated the dominance of air power over the capital ships that had been the backbone of naval power since the 1600s.

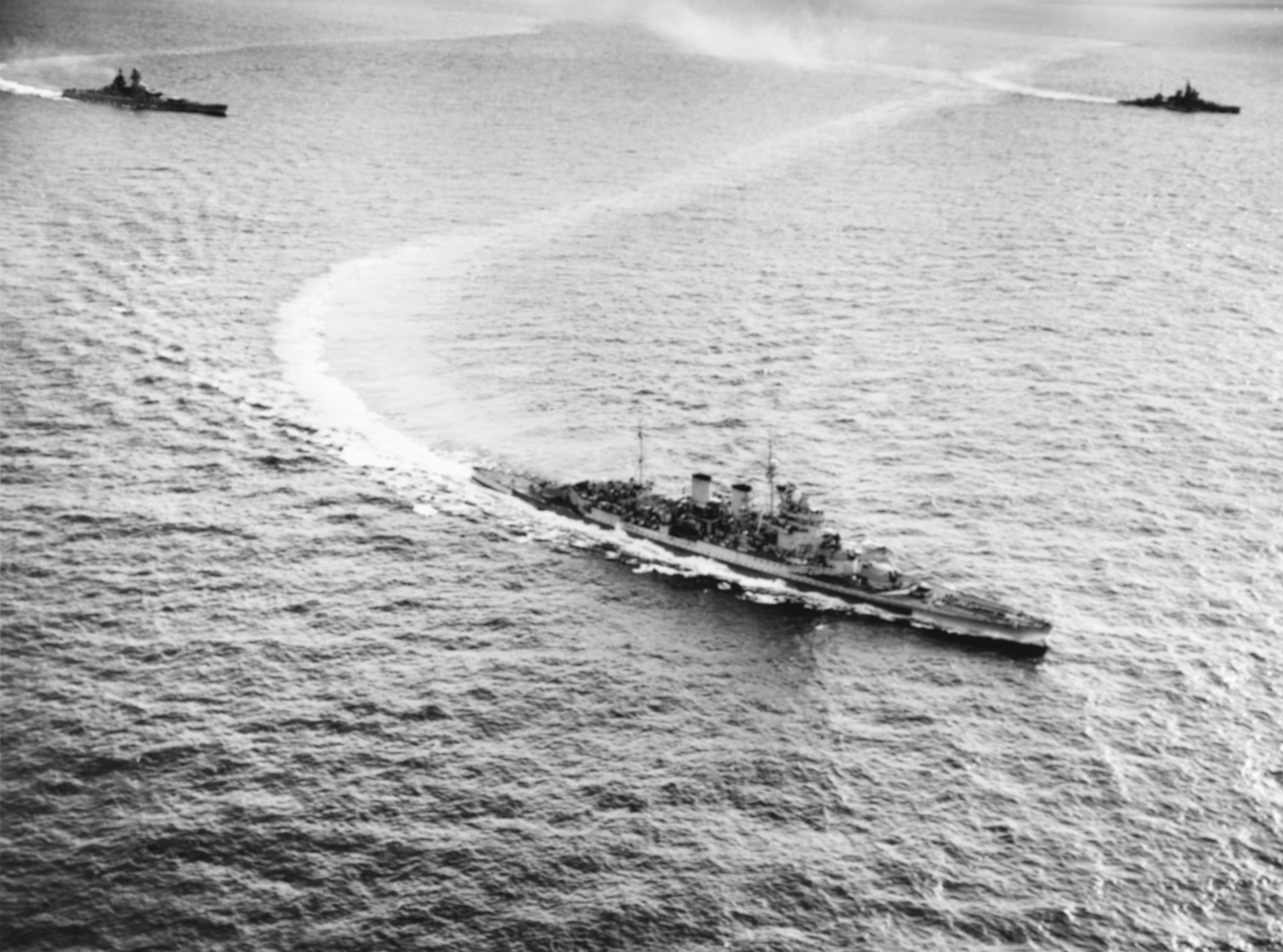
Renown in the Indian Ocean area, 12 May 1944. Valiant is in the right distance. The Richelieu is in the left background.

Renown was recommissioned on 28 August 1939 as part of the Home Fleet. Much like her sister, she spent September patrolling in the North Sea, but was transferred to Force K in the South Atlantic to help search for the heavy cruiser Admiral Graf Spee. The ship joined Force H at the Cape of Good Hope in November to prevent Admiral Graf Spee from breaking into the South Atlantic. She was unsuccessful in this, but sank the blockade runner SS Watussi on 2 December. She remained in the South Atlantic even after Admiral Graf Spee was scuttled on 13 December and did not return to the Home Fleet until March 1940. The ship became flagship of the Battlecruiser Squadron when Hood was paid off to refit that month. Renown also supported British forces during the Norwegian Campaign and briefly engaged the German battleships Scharnhorst and Gneisenau on 9 April. Renown opened fire first, but she was hit first by two 28-centimetre (11 in) shells that only slightly damaged her. A few minutes later she hit Gneisenau with one 15-inch and two 4.5-inch shells that knocked out the main fire-control director and damaged the rangefinder on "A" turret. The German ships were faster than Renown in the heavy weather and were able to successfully disengage. The ship was repaired from 20 April to 18 May and provided cover during the evacuation from Norway in early June. Renown was transferred to Force H at Gibraltar in August and relieved Hood as flagship.

In November 1940 Force H covered the small aircraft carrier Argus as she flew off Hurricane fighters bound for Malta from a position south of Sardinia. Later that month Force H participated in the inconclusive Battle of Cape Spartivento. Renown bombarded Genoa on 9 February 1941 with little effect. Renown and Force H escorted convoys both inside and outside the Mediterranean in March–May 1941 before being summoned into the Atlantic to search for the Bismarck. Force H escorted another convoy to Malta in July and Renown returned home for repairs the next month. The ship was transferred to the Home Fleet in November when her repairs were complete. She provided cover for the inbound and outbound convoys to the Soviet Union in early March 1942. She became flagship of Force W which was formed to escort carriers carrying fighters to be flown-off for Malta in April–May.

Renown rejoined Home Fleet once those missions were completed, but was transferred to Force H in October 1942 to participate in Operation Torch. She returned to Britain to refit from February to June 1943. The ship brought Winston Churchill and his staff back from the Quebec Conference in September and conveyed them to the Cairo Conference in November. She rejoined the Home Fleet in December, just in time to be transferred to the Eastern Fleet a few weeks later. Renown arrived in Colombo at the end of January 1944 where she was flagship of the 1st Battle Squadron. In April she participated in Operation Cockpit, an airstrike against port and oil facilities on Sabang, off the island of Sumatra. The ship bombarded Japanese-occupied facilities on Car Nicobar in the Nicobar Islands and Port Blair in the Andaman Islands on 30 April – 1 May. Renown supported the airstrike against Surabaya, Java (Operation Transom) on 17 May as well as follow-on attack against Port Blair on 21 June. After another airstrike on 25 July on Sabang the ship bombarded the city. She bombarded facilities in the Nicobar Islands from 17 to 19 October. On 22 November Renown was replaced as flagship by Queen Elizabeth and the ship began a refit at Durban from December to February 1945. She was recalled to home waters in March, lest the remaining German heavy ships make a final sortie, and reached Rosyth on 15 April. She was given a brief refit when this concern proved illusory and was placed in reserve in May 1945. Renown was partially disarmed in July when six of her 4.5-inch turrets were removed, as well as all of her light guns. The ship hosted a meeting between King George VI and President Truman on 3 August when the latter was en route home aboard the heavy cruiser USS Augusta. The decision to dispose of the ship was announced on 21 January 1948 and she was towed to Faslane for scrapping on 3 August.
