= HMS Danae (D44) =

Cruiser of the Royal Navy

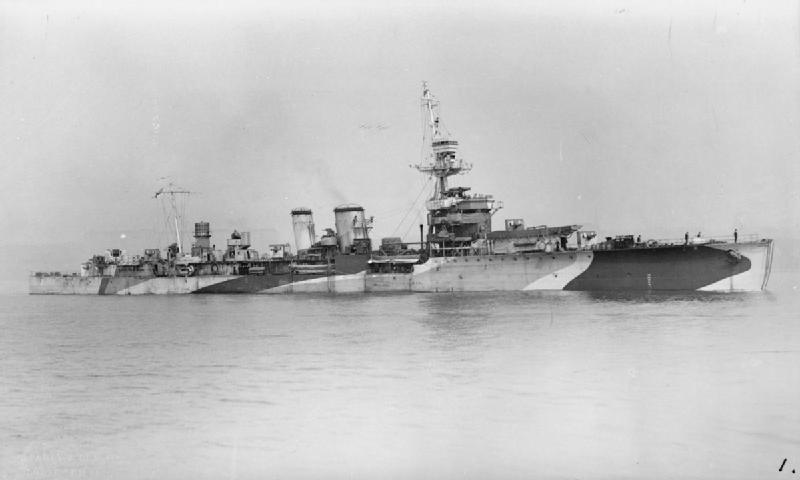
- HMS Danae underway, August 1943

History

United Kingdom
- Name: HMS Danae
- Namesake: Danaë
- Builder: Armstrong Whitworth
- Laid down: 1 December 1916
- Launched: 26 January 1918
- Commissioned: 22 July 1918
- Decommissioned: 4 October 1944
- Identification: Pennant number: 32 (Jul 18); 89 (Nov 19); I.89 (1936); D.89 (1940)
- Fate: Transferred to Poland

Poland
- Name: ORP Conrad
- Namesake: Józef Konrad Korzeniowski
- Commissioned: 4 October 1944
- Decommissioned: 28 September 1946
- Fate: Returned to Royal Navy

United Kingdom
- Name: HMS Danae
- Namesake: Danaë
- Recommissioned: 28 September 1946
- Decommissioned: 22 January 1948
- Fate: Scrapped 27 March 1948 at Barrow

General characteristics
- Class & type: Danae-class light cruiser
- Displacement: 4,276 tons; Full: 5,603 tons; After 1924: 4,850
- Length: 445 ft (136 m)
- Beam: 46.5 ft (14.2 m)
- Draught: 14.5 ft (4.4 m)
- Propulsion: Six Yarrow-type water-tube boilers; Parsons geared steam turbines; Two shafts; 40,000 shp (30,000 kW)
- Speed: 29 knots (54 km/h; 33 mph)
- Range: 1,060 tons of oil; 1,480 nautical miles (2,740 km; 1,700 mi) at 29 knots (54 km/h; 33 mph); 6,700 nautical miles (12,400 km; 7,700 mi) at 10 knots (19 km/h; 12 mph)
- Complement: 462
- Armament: 1918: six BL 6-inch (152.4 mm) L/45 Mark XII guns on single mountings CP Mark XIV; two QF 3-inch (76.2 mm) Mk II AA guns; two 40 mm QF 2 pdr "Pom-pom" AA guns; twelve 21 inch (533 mm) (533 mm) torpedoes (4 triple launchers); 1930: six BL 6-inch (152.4 mm) L/45 Mark XII guns; three QF 4-inch (101.6 mm) Mk V AA guns; two 40 mm 2 pdr Pom-pom AA guns; twelve 533 mm torpedo launchers; 1942: six 6-inch (152 mm) Mk XII guns; two 4-inch Mk V AA guns; six 40 mm 2 pdr Pom-pom AA; twelve 533 mm torpedo launchers; 1943: five 6-inch (152 mm) guns, one 4-inch (102 mm) gun; 8 × 40 mm 2 pdr Pom-pom AA guns; 3 × quadruple mounting Mark VII 2 pounder Mark VIII guns; 12 × 20 mm AA guns; depth charge launcher
- Armour: 3 inch side (amidships); 2, 1¾, 1½ side (bow and stern); 1 inch upper decks (amidships); 1 inch deck over rudder

HMS Danae was the lead ship of the Danae-class cruisers (also known as the D class), serving with the Royal Navy between the world wars and with the Polish Navy during the latter part of World War II as ORP Conrad.

== Service ==
Danae was laid down on 1 December 1916 in the Armstrong Whitworth Shipyard in Walker-on-Tyne and launched on 26 January 1918. The lead ship of her class, she was one of the fastest cruisers of her time. Propelled by two Brown-Curtis steam turbines of 40,000 horsepower (30,000 kW), 6 boilers and 2 propellers, she could travel at 29 knots (54 km/h; 33 mph). With 1,060 tons of oil in her tanks, she had a range of 1,480 nautical miles (2,740 km; 1,700 mi) at 29 knots and 6,700 nautical miles (12,400 km; 7,700 mi) at 10 knots (19 km/h; 12 mph). She was also well armoured, with the sides and the command deck protected with 3 inches (76 mm) of reinforced steel, the tanks and munition chambers with 57 millimetres (2.2 in), and the main deck with 2 inches (51 mm).

Attached to the Harwich-based 5th Light Cruiser Squadron, she took part in several North Sea patrols during the last months of World War I. She fired on four enemy aeroplanes and a Zeppelin airship on the 11 August 1918, setting the Zeppelin aflame.

Between October and November of the following year, she passed to the Baltic Sea, where she supported the Whites in the Russian Civil War, along with her sister ships Dragon and Dauntless. In February 1920 she was attached to the 1st Light Cruiser Squadron of the Atlantic Fleet.

=== World cruise ===
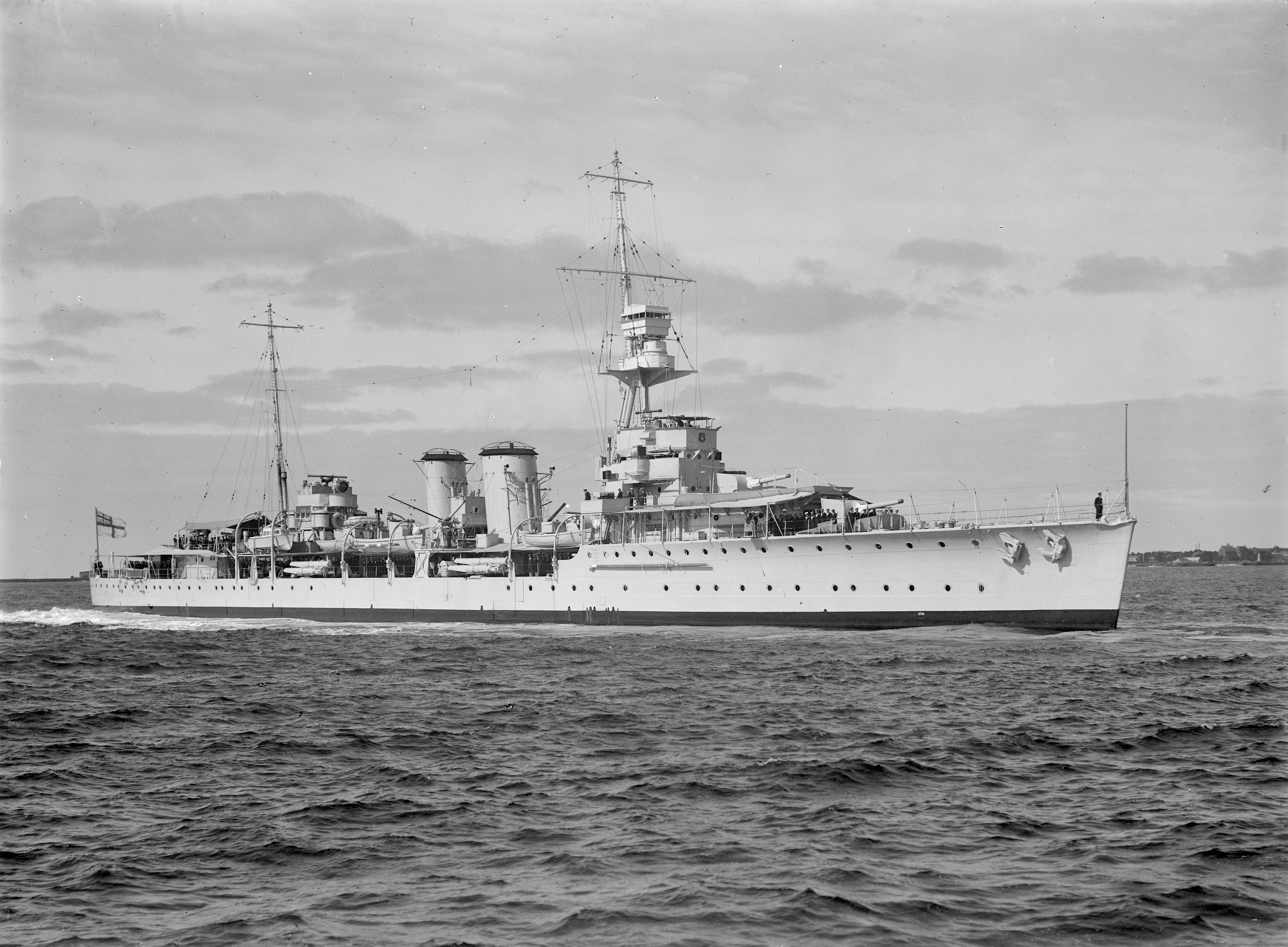
HMS Danae in 1937

In 1923 she was attached to the Special Service Squadron, a naval fleet created for propaganda purposes. The flotilla further consisted of the battlecruisers Hood, Repulse and the cruisers Delhi, Dragon, Dauntless and Dunedin, as well as 9 other ships (mostly destroyers), and was bound on a journey around the world. The Squadron left Devonport on 27 November and headed for Freetown in Sierra Leone. Then the task force visited Cape Town, Port Elizabeth, East London and Durban, to where she arrived the last day of the year. The following day the Squadron left for Zanzibar, then visited Trincomalee, Singapore, Fremantle (February 1924), Albany, Adelaide, Melbourne, Hobart and Sydney, from where she left for Wellington in New Zealand. She left the port in May and on 16 May paid a short visit to Suva and Samara on Fiji, then to Honolulu (6 June), Victoria (25 June), Vancouver and then San Francisco (until 11 July). There the Squadron was split and the battlecruisers headed for Great Britain through the Panama Canal and various ports in South America, including British Guyana, Antilles and Jamaica.The light cruisers sailed south around South America visiting various ports on the way, Callao, Valparaiso and Talcahuano and through the Strait of Magallan. From there stopping at the Falkland Islands, Bahia Blanca, Buenos Aires, Montevideo and Rio de Janeiro, crossing the Atlantic Ocean with a final stop on the Cape Verde Islands before heading back for the Great Britain.

Transferred to the Mediterranean, between 1927 and 1929 Danae served as an escort of the 1st Cruiser Squadron, after which she was withdrawn to Great Britain for refurbishment and modernisation.

=== America and West Indies Station ===
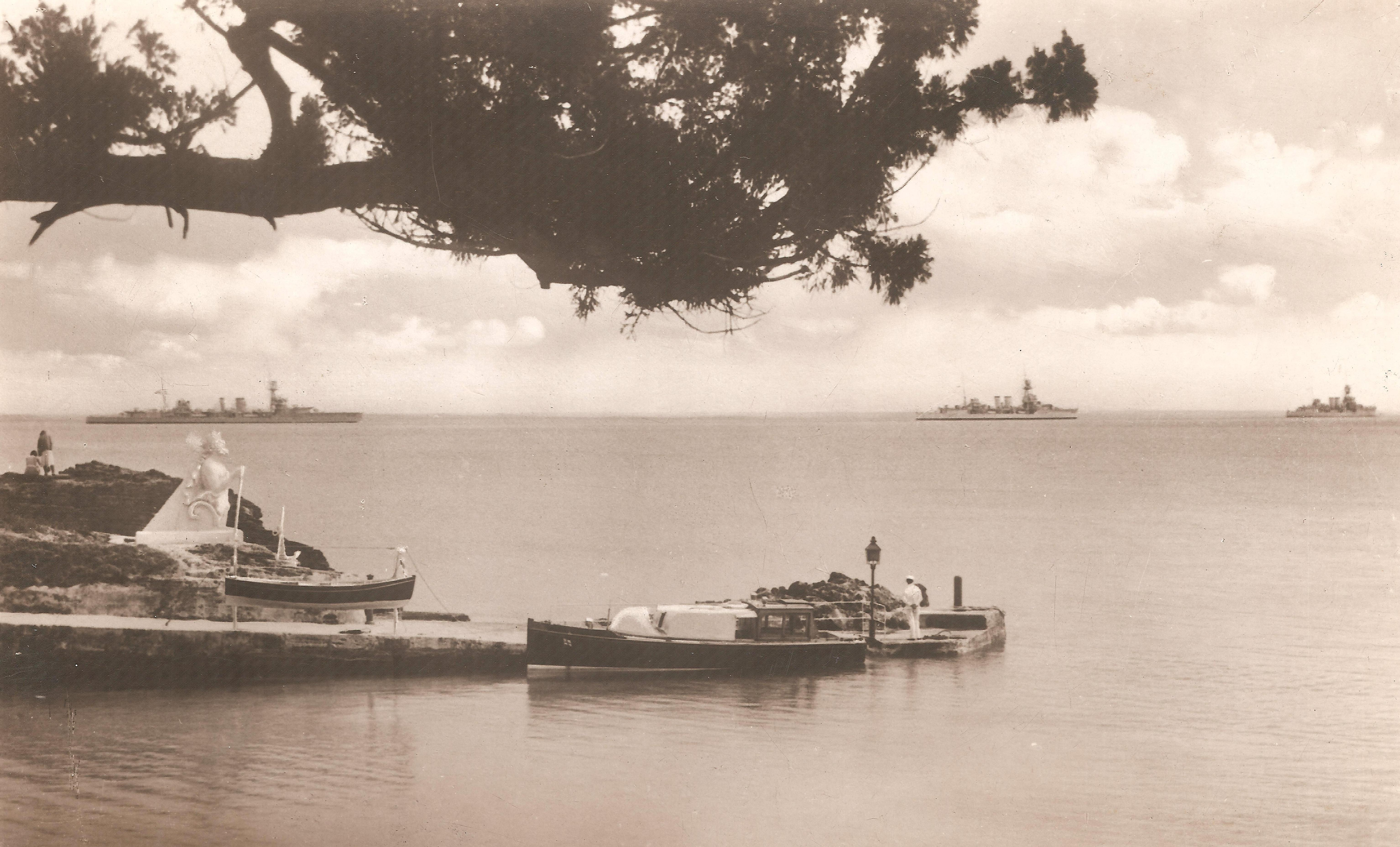
America and West Indies Station 1st Division (HMS Dragon, HMS Danae and HMS Despatch) off Admiralty House in 1931 as they depart their base at the Royal Naval Dockyard in the Imperial fortress colony of Bermuda to exercise on the open ocean

In 1930 she returned to active service. Danae left Devonport on 20 August 1930, for Bermuda, by way of Halifax, Nova Scotia, towing the paddle-wheeled tug Sandboy (formerly named Strenuous). She towed the tug the entire distance, except for exiting and entering port. Danae and Sandboy reached Halifax on 2 September. On 6 September (when she was reported to belong to the Atlantic Squadron, but was actually joining the 8th Cruiser Squadron on the America and West Indies Station, based at the Royal Naval Dockyard in the Imperial fortress colony of Bermuda), Danae left Sandboy at Halifax, in order to render aid to Santo Domingo, which had been struck by a hurricane, arriving there on 10 September (with the Royal Fleet Auxiliary oiler Serbol also arriving to render aid) and handing over to the Government of dictator Rafael Trujillo and the American Relief Committee all of the ship's medical supplies above what was retained in case of an emergency and all surplus food. Ships of the America and West Indies Station were generally scattered from Newfoundland to Cape Horn, and venturing into the Pacific Ocean, on cruises, but returned to Bermuda periodically where the fleet would gather for exercises. Danae under Captain Eric Richard Bent arrived at the Royal Naval Dockyard, where the fleet was to gather in October, on 22 September from Santo Domingo. Danae did not remain at Bermuda long before returning to Halifax for the Sandboy. On 17 October she left Halifax with the Sandboy in tow, and the two vessels arrived at Bermuda on 20 October. Danae crossed the Atlantic in February, 1933, to pay off her crew and re-commission for further service on the America and West Indies station, her new crew including Lieutenant Sir Michael Culme-Seymour, Bt., son of the former Commander-in-Chief on the station of the same name, and Lieutenant Blakeman Vesey, returning to her base at Bermuda via Gibraltar, bearing additional ratings for the crews of HMS Durban and HMS Dauntless. Lieutenant Vesey would be washed overboard to his death in heavy weather on her return to Bermuda from Washington, DC, that November.

In 1935, at the outbreak of the Second Sino-Japanese War, she escorted various evacuation convoys from Shanghai to Hong Kong and was fired at by the Japanese Navy.

=== Second World War ===
After completing her duties in the Far East, Danae was again moved to Great Britain and placed in reserve. Mobilized in July 1939, she was attached to the 9th Cruiser Squadron, initially operating in the South Atlantic and then the Indian Ocean from October. On 23 March 1940 she was attached to the Malaya Force, and took part in various patrols in the area of the Dutch East Indies and Singapore. On 20 January she was attached to the China Force, and started to escort convoys in the Yellow Sea and between the Dutch Indies and Ceylon, together with the cruisers Durban, Dauntless, Cornwall and the Australian HMAS Canberra. On 24 February she arrived in Batavia and then went on to Colombo, from where she was withdrawn to Cape Town for refurbishment.

She returned to active service in July 1943, after 11 months in the shipyard. In March 1944 she returned to Great Britain and was attached to the 1st Cruiser Squadron. During the Invasion of Normandy, she performed ground support missions in the Sword Beach sector. In July the squadron moved to the area of Port en Bessin and Ouistreham, and returned to Great Britain in August. Danae was then withdrawn from active service, and used as a hulk in the port of Plymouth.

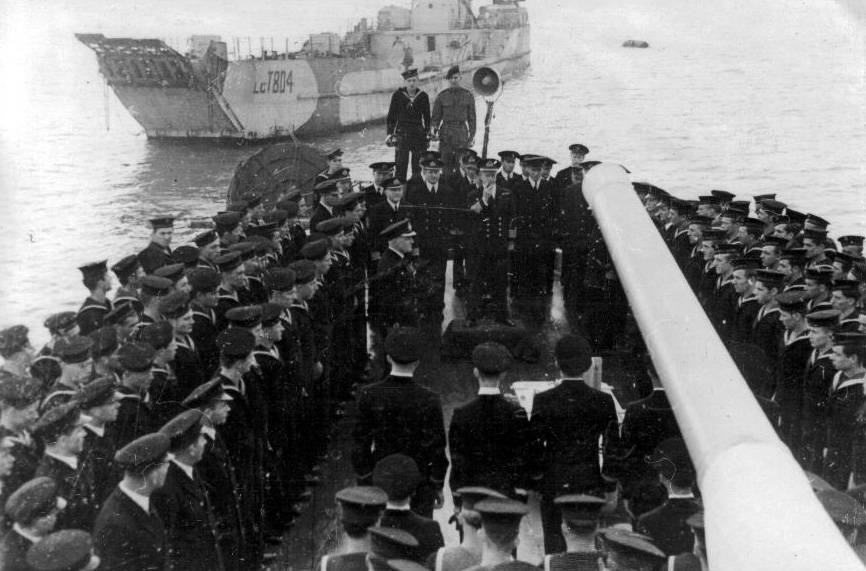
Polish sailors raise the Polish flag on Danae's transfer to the Polish Navy

After the loss of her sister ship ORP Dragon, on 4 October Danae was leased to the Polish Navy. Danae was now manned mostly by the surviving part of Dragon's crew. and commanded by Cmdr. Stanisław Dzienisiewicz. She was refurbished in Southampton and then Chatham until 23 January 1945. Initially the ship was to be renamed to either "ORP Wilno" or "ORP Lwów", after the cities of Wilno (Vilnius) and Lwów (Lviv). This was seen as controversial because although the cities were part of Poland until after the war, they were at that time claimed by the Soviet Union, and the British authorities did not wish to offend the Soviets. It was decided to use the politically neutral name of ORP Conrad, after Józef Konrad Korzeniowski, better known under his English pen name of Joseph Conrad. In February, the ship moved to Scapa Flow, on 2 April she was attached to the 10th Cruiser Squadron (comprising Birmingham, Bellona, Diadem, and Dido), but was again withdrawn for repair of damaged turbines a week later. She left the shipyard only on 30 May, three weeks after war in Europe ended. Attached to the 29th Destroyer Flotilla (comprising Zodiac, Zephyr and Zest), she was briefly stationed in the port of Wilhelmshaven, the main base of the Kriegsmarine, recently captured by the Polish 1st Armoured Division.

Until the end of 1945 she served as a transport ship, transporting Polish Red Cross help to Norway and Denmark. In January of the following year she returned to Rosyth for good. There she carried out training tasks with ships of the Polish Navy, including ORP Burza, ORP Błyskawica, ORP Piorun, and ORP Garland. On 8 March 1946 the ships were decommissioned from the Home Fleet and the Polish crews began preparing to hand them back to the British. By August the ship's crew was reduced by 50%, and on 28 September she was returned to the Royal Navy. Renamed back to Danae she was taken over by the Care & Maintenance Party and moved to Falmouth. On 22 January 1948 she was sold to Thos. W. Ward, and starting 27 March 1948 was scrapped in the Vickers Armstrong shipyard in Barrow-in-Furness.

== Bibliography ==
- Campbell, N.J.M. (1980). "Great Britain". In Chesneau, Roger (ed.). Conway's All the World's Fighting Ships 1922–1946. Mayflower Books. pp. 2–85. ISBN 0-8317-0303-2.
- Colledge, J. J.; Warlow, Ben (2006) [1969]. Ships of the Royal Navy: The Complete Record of All Fighting Ships of the Royal Navy from the 15th Century to the Present (3rd Rev ed.). London: Chatham Publishing. ISBN 978-1-86176-281-8. OCLC 67375475.
- Dunn, Steve R. (2022). The Harwich Striking Force: The Royal Navy's Front Line in the North Sea, 1914-1918. Seaforth Publishing. ISBN 978-1-3990-1596-7.
- Friedman, Norman (2011). Naval Weapons of World War One: Guns, Torpedoes, Mines and ASW Weapons of All Nations; An Illustrated Directory. Seaforth Publishing. ISBN 978-1-84832-100-7.
- Preston, Antony (1985). "Great Britain and Empire Forces". In Gray, Randal (ed.). Conway's All the World's Fighting Ships 1906–1921. Naval Institute Press. pp. 1–104. ISBN 0-85177-245-5.
- Raven, Alan & Roberts, John (1980). British Cruisers of World War Two. Naval Institute Press. ISBN 0-87021-922-7.
- Rohwer, Jürgen (2005). Chronology of the War at Sea 1939–1945: The Naval History of World War Two (Third Revised ed.). Naval Institute Press. ISBN 1-59114-119-2.
- Whitley, M. J. (1995). Cruisers of World War Two: An International Encyclopedia. Cassell. ISBN 1-86019-874-0.
