= John Knowles Im Thurn =

British Royal Navy officer (1881 – 1956)

Vice-Admiral John Knowles Im Thurn CB CMG CBE
- Born: 7 March 1881
- Died: 5 July 1956 (aged 75)
- Military career
- Allegiance: United Kingdom
- Branch: Royal Navy
- Service years: 1895–1935
- Rank: Vice-Admiral
- Conflicts: World War I
- Awards: Companion of the Order of the Bath; Companion of the Order of St Michael and St George; Commander of the Order of the British Empire

Vice-Admiral John Knowles Im Thurn, CB, CMG, CBE (7 March 1881 – 5 July 1956) was a British Royal Navy officer who was Assistant Chief of the Naval Staff from 1931 to 1933.

== Biography ==
Im Thurn joined the Royal Navy in January 1895, and was promoted to the rank of lieutenant on 15 January 1902. In August that year he was posted to the torpedo boat depot ship HMS Vulcan, serving with the Mediterranean Fleet. He served in the First World War, mainly with wireless telegraph and signalling duties, and was promoted to the rank of captain on 30 June 1918. After the war he held several staff appointments, as Assistant Director Electrical Section in the Torpedoes and Mining department until 1920, then Director of the Signal Department until 1921.

He was captain of HMS Hood from 1923 to 1925, during which time the ship participated in a promotional tour of various ports around the world, the World Cruise of the Special Service Squadron.

In March 1931 he was appointed Assistant Chief of the Naval Staff, a senior appointment in the Royal Navy. He served in this position until 1933, when he was appointed commanding officer of the 1st Cruiser Squadron in the Mediterranean Fleet.

He was promoted to vice-admiral in January 1935, and retired from service later the same year.

== Family ==
Im Thurn was married to Margaret Elizabeth Fleming.

Military offices
Preceded by Rear-Admiral Wilfred Tomkinson	Assistant Chief of the Naval Staff; 1931–1933	Succeeded by Rear-Admiral Sidney Bailey
