= Cruise of the Special Service Squadron =

Royal Navy cruise (1923–24)

Empire Cruise
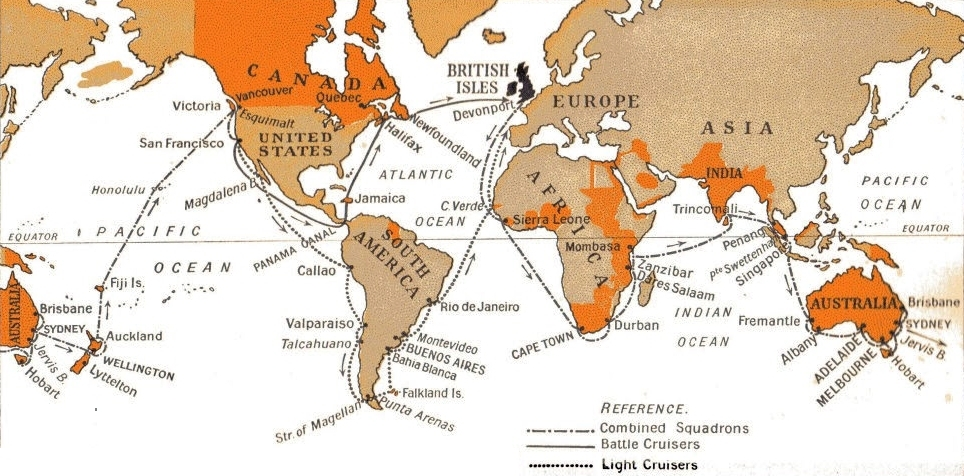
- The route of the cruise
- Country: United Kingdom
- Leader: Rear Admiral Sir Frederick Field
- Start: 27 November 1923; 102 years ago
- End: 28 September 1924; 101 years ago
- Ships: HMS Hood; HMS Repulse; HMS Danae; HMS Dauntless; HMS Delhi; HMS Dragon

In 1923–24, battlecruisers HMS Hood, HMS Repulse and the Special Service Squadron sailed around the world on The Empire Cruise, making many ports of call in the countries which had fought together during the First World War. The squadron departed Devonport on 27 November 1923 and headed for Sierra Leone. Returning from the Pacific, the battlecruisers passed through the Panama Canal, while the light cruisers rounded Cape Horn. The cruise aimed to promote the power of the Royal Navy and demonstrate its post-war logistical capabilities.

== Ships involved ==
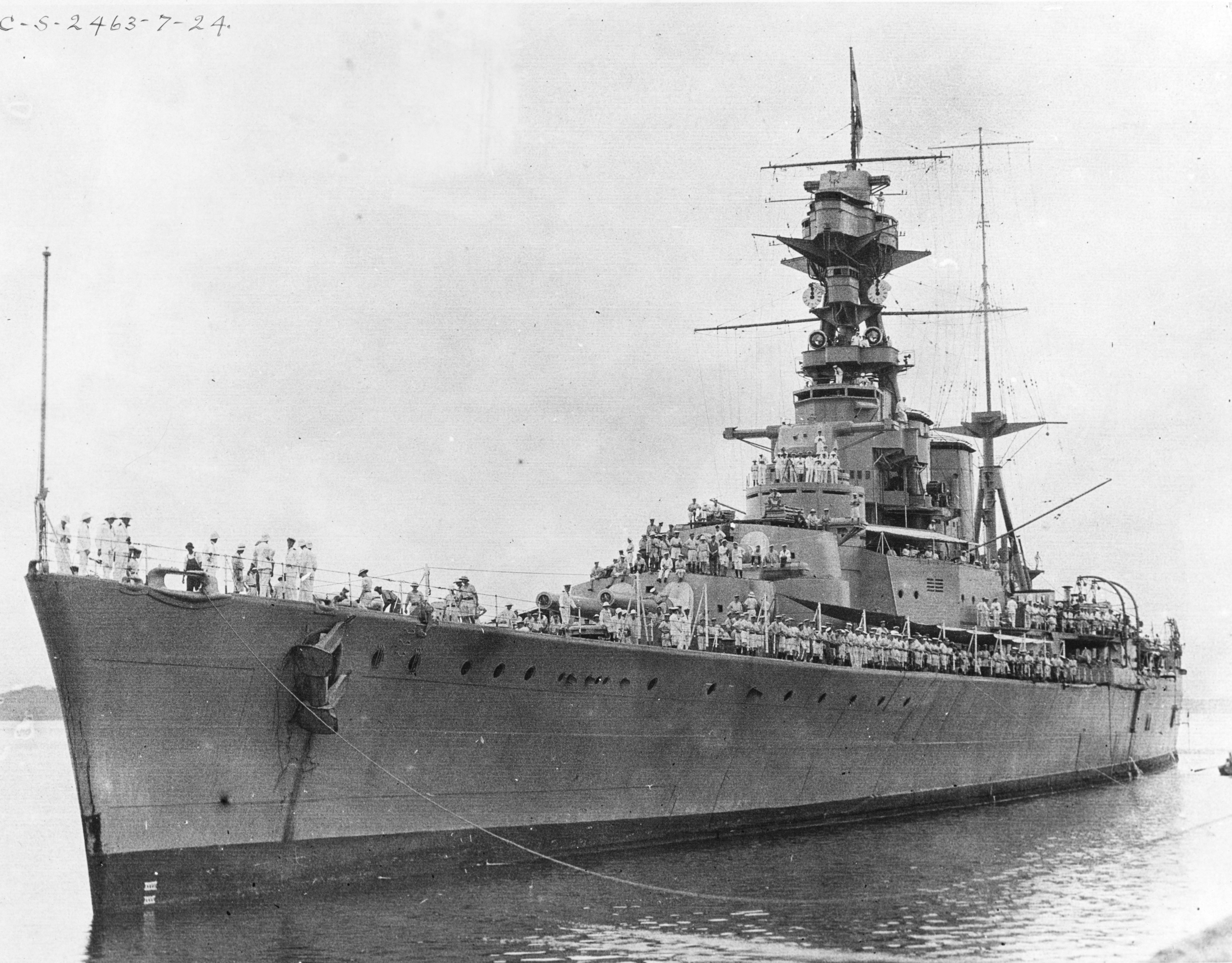
The Battlecruiser HMS Hood at the Panama Canal Zone in July 1924.

- Battlecruisers under Rear Admiral Sir Frederick Field
  - HMS Hood (Captain John K Im Thurn)
  - HMS Repulse (Captain Henry Parker)
- Light cruisers under Rear Admiral Sir Hubert Brand
  - HMS Danae (Captain F Austin)
  - HMS Dauntless (Captain C Round-Turner)
  - HMS Delhi (Captain J Murray Pipon)
  - HMS Dragon (Captain B Fairbairn)
  - HMS Dunedin (Captain AF Beal)
  - HMAS Adelaide Joined in Australia.

== Ports of call ==
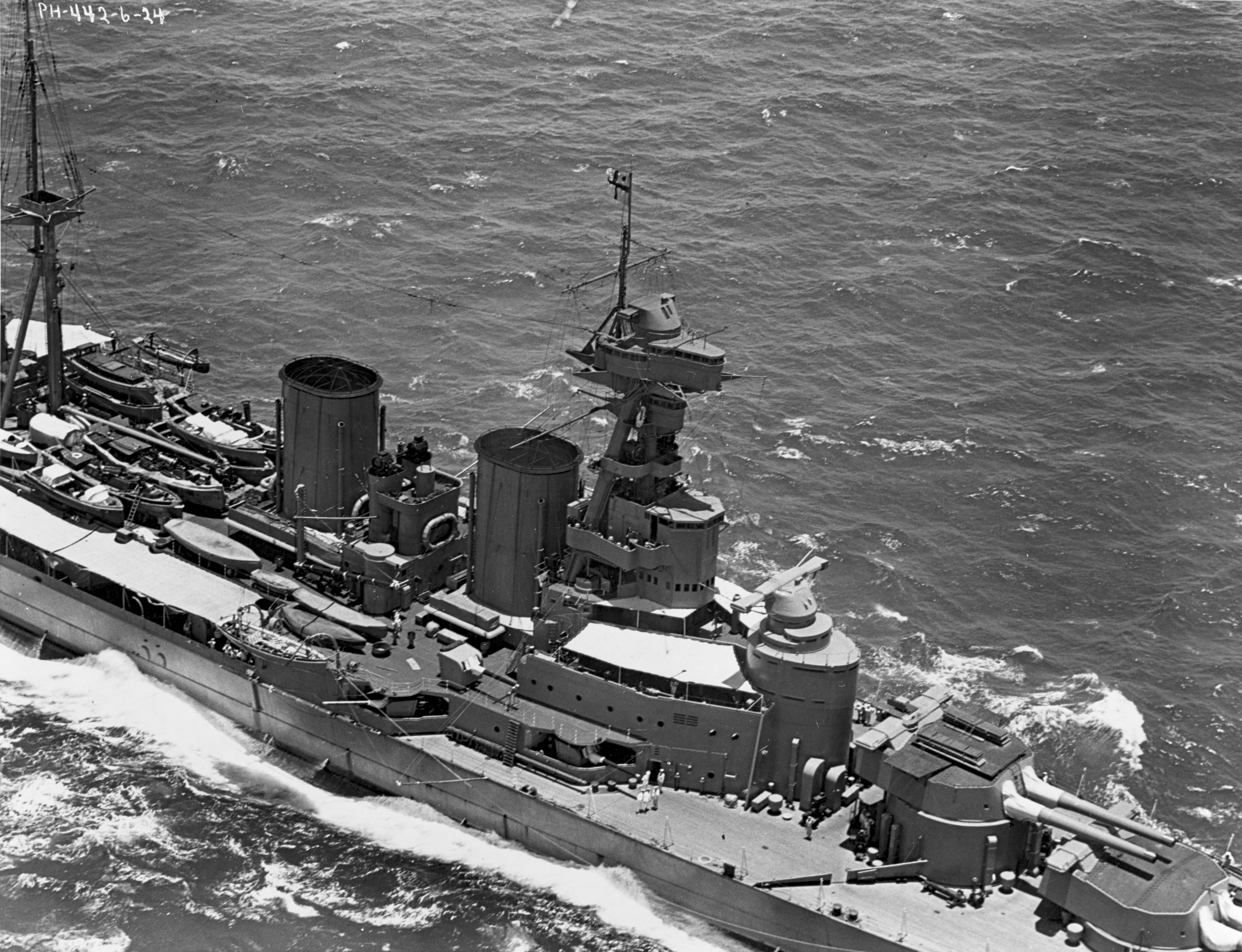
Taken by a plane from Naval Air Station, Pearl Harbor, while Hood was off Honolulu, Hawaii, on 12 June 1924.

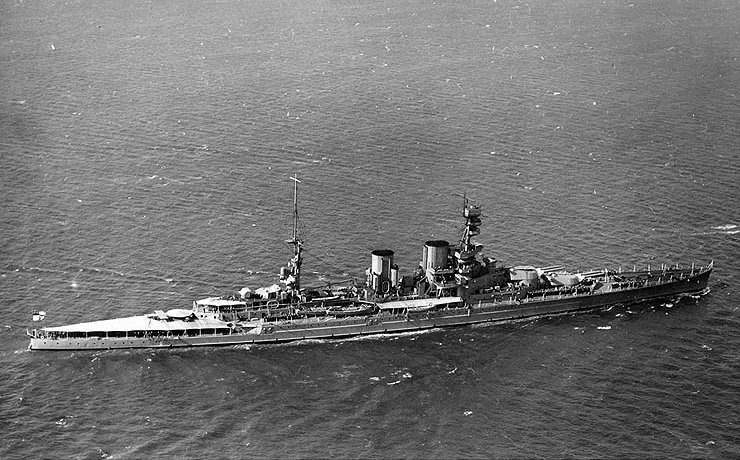
HMS Repulse taken on the cruise.

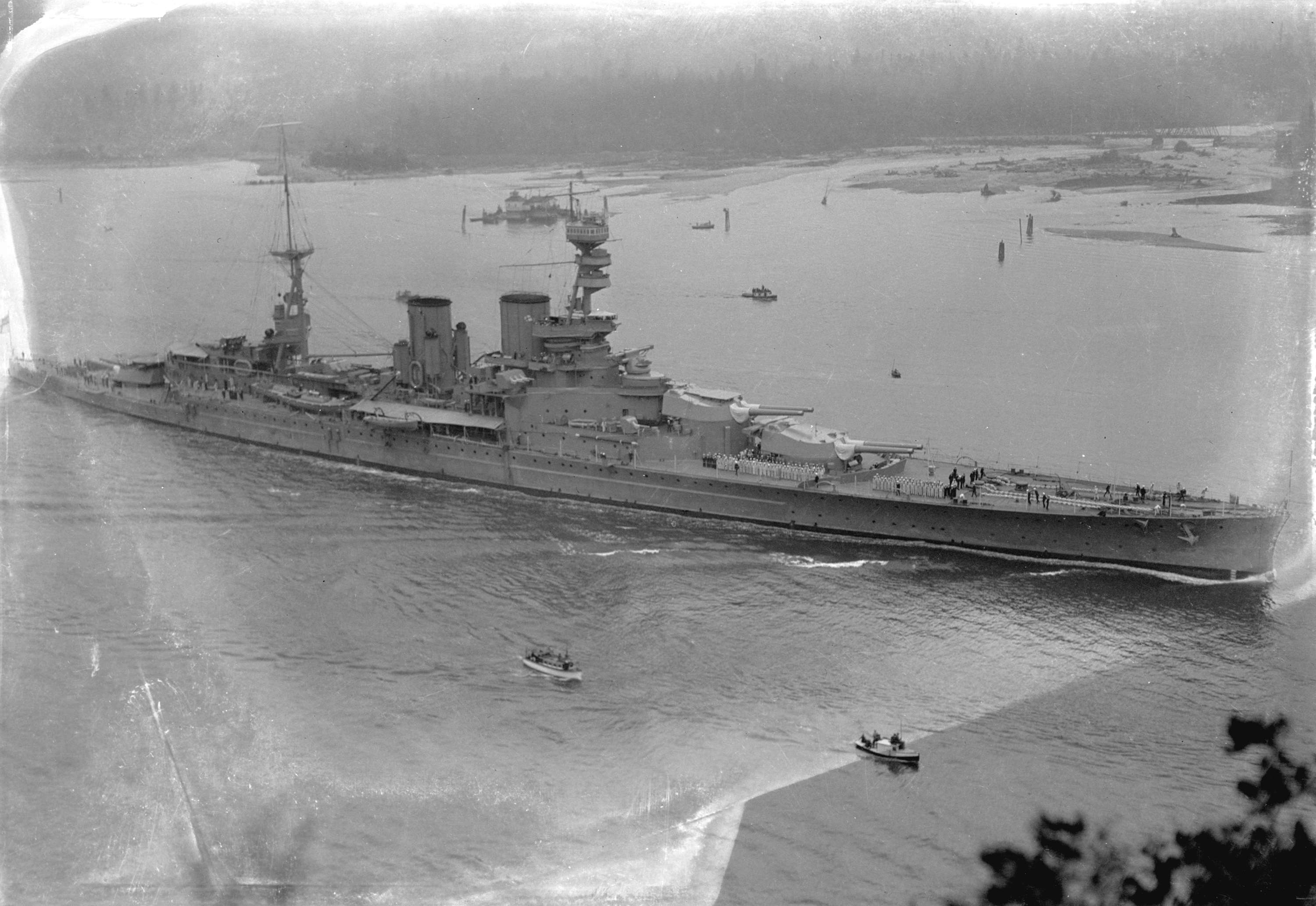
HMS Repulse entering Vancouver Harbour, 1924

=== Africa and the Indian Ocean ===
The fleet sailed from HMNB Devonport on 27 November 1923, and headed for Freetown, Sierra Leone, where the fleet was greeted by the Governor. Food and provisions were taken aboard after the journey of 2805 miles. The ships then sailed to Cape Town and arrived 22 December, adding a further 3,252 miles to the cruise distance. Some of the sailors and marines performed in a ceremonial march, to great fanfare.

The Squadron crossed the Equator on Saturday 15 December with the traditional ceremony of ‘Crossing the Line’

The fleet sailed for a short visit to Mossel Bay, East London and Durban, where the fleet left South Africa on 6 January 1924 for Zanzibar. HMS Danae sailed to Dar es Salaam. On the 12 January, HMS Delhi and HMS Dauntless anchored at Mombasa, Kenya. HMS Hood, HMS Renown and HMS Dunedin arrived at Zanzibar. Upon their arrival in Zanzibar on 17 January the fleet was greeted by Sultan Khalifa Bin Harub, which now encompassed the regular ceremonial March Past. The total distance covered was 11,734 miles.

- Cape Verde
- Sierra Leone
- Cape Town
- Durban
- Zanzibar
- Mombasa
- Dar-es-Salaam (Danae)
- Trincomalee

=== Far East ===
En route to Trincomalee, the Squadron was joined by the cruiser HMS Dunedin, en route to become flagship of the New Zealand Division; she would sail with them as far New Zealand. The fleet arrived for the far east tour in Port Swettenham, Malaysia, on 4 February, where the ship fired a 17 gun salute for the Sultan. The fleet also incurred its first fatality when a seaman died of malaria, a local funeral was arranged. 10 February marked the arrival of the fleet at the important British Naval Base at Singapore. In the same year of the cruise Singapore had been approved by the British Government to become the major British base in the far east with massive investment.

- Port Swettenham, Malaysia
- Singapore

=== Australia and New Zealand ===
- Fremantle
- Albany, Western Australia
- Adelaide
- Melbourne
- Hobart
- Jervis Bay
- Sydney (Adelaide joins)
- Brisbane, Wellington
- Sydney (2)
- Lyttleton
- Bluff (Dauntless)
- Dunedin
- Auckland

=== Pacific ===
- Fiji
- Honolulu

=== West coast of North America and Caribbean ===
- Vancouver
- Esquimalt/Victoria
- San Francisco
- Colón, Panama
- Jamaica

=== South America ===
- Callao
- Valparaíso (Delhi, Danae)
- Talcahuano (Dauntless, Dragon)
- Punta Arenas (cancelled due to bad weather)
- Falkland Islands (Dauntless)
- Bahía Blanca (Dragon)
- Buenos Aires (Delhi, Danae)
- Montevideo (Dauntless, Dragon)
- Rio de Janeiro

=== East coast of Canada and Newfoundland ===
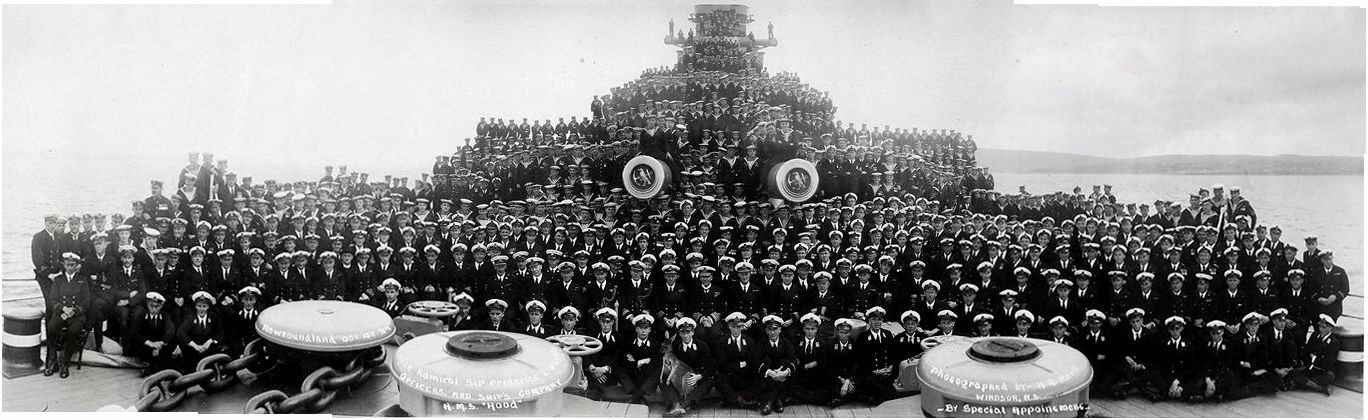
Crew of HMS Hood in Topsail, Newfoundland during the final stop of the cruise

- Halifax, Nova Scotia
- Quebec City
- Conception Bay, Newfoundland

== See also ==
- List of circumnavigations
