= HMS Dauntless (D45) =

Cruiser of the Royal Navy

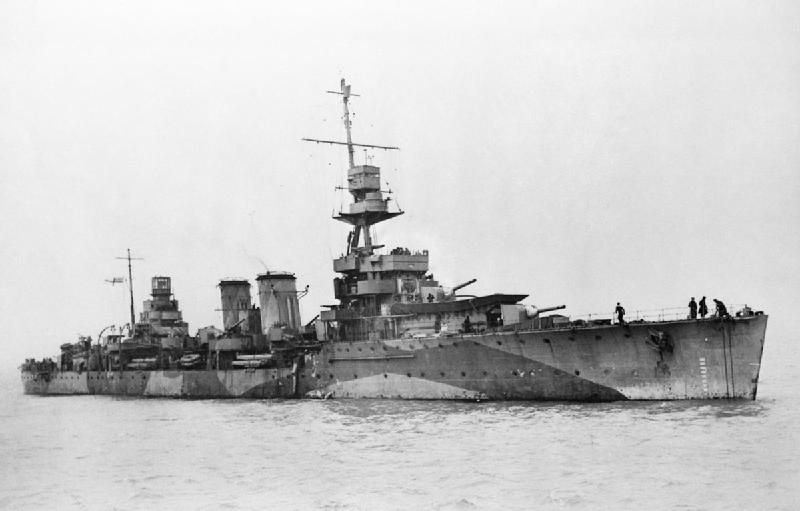

History

United Kingdom
- Name: HMS Dauntless
- Ordered: September 1916
- Builder: Palmers Shipbuilding and Iron Company, Jarrow
- Laid down: 3 January 1917
- Launched: 10 April 1918
- Commissioned: 22 November 1918
- Identification: Pennant number: 71 (Nov 18); 45 (Nov 19); I.45 (1936); D.45 (1940)
- Fate: Broken up April 1946

General characteristics
- Class & type: Danae-class light cruiser
- Displacement: 4,650 tons
- Length: 471 ft (144 m)
- Beam: 46 ft (14 m)
- Draught: 14.5 ft (4.4 m)
- Propulsion: Six Yarrow-type water-tube boilers; Parsons geared steam turbines; Two shafts; 40,000 shp (30,000 kW)
- Speed: 29 knots (54 km/h)
- Range: 2,300 nm
- Complement: 350
- Armament: 1918: six BL 6-inch (152.4 mm) L/45 Mark XII guns on single mountings CP Mark XIV; two QF 3 inch (76.2 mm) Mk II AA guns; two 40 mm QF 2 pdr "Pom-pom" AA guns; twelve 21 inch (533 mm) (533 mm) torpedoes (4 triple launchers)
- Armour: 3 inch side (amidships); 2, 1¾, 1½ side (bow and stern); 1 inch upper decks (amidships); 1 inch deck over rudder

HMS Dauntless was a Danae-class light cruiser of the Royal Navy. She was built by Palmers Shipbuilding and Iron Company of Jarrow, launched on 10 April 1918 and commissioned on 22 November 1918.

== Design ==
The Danae class mounted an extra 6 inch gun and a heavier torpedo armament, compared with their predecessors, the C-class cruiser. The class also had larger low revolution propellers for greater efficiency. Dauntless herself was completed with a large hangar under her bridge, which was eventually removed in 1920.

== Interwar service ==
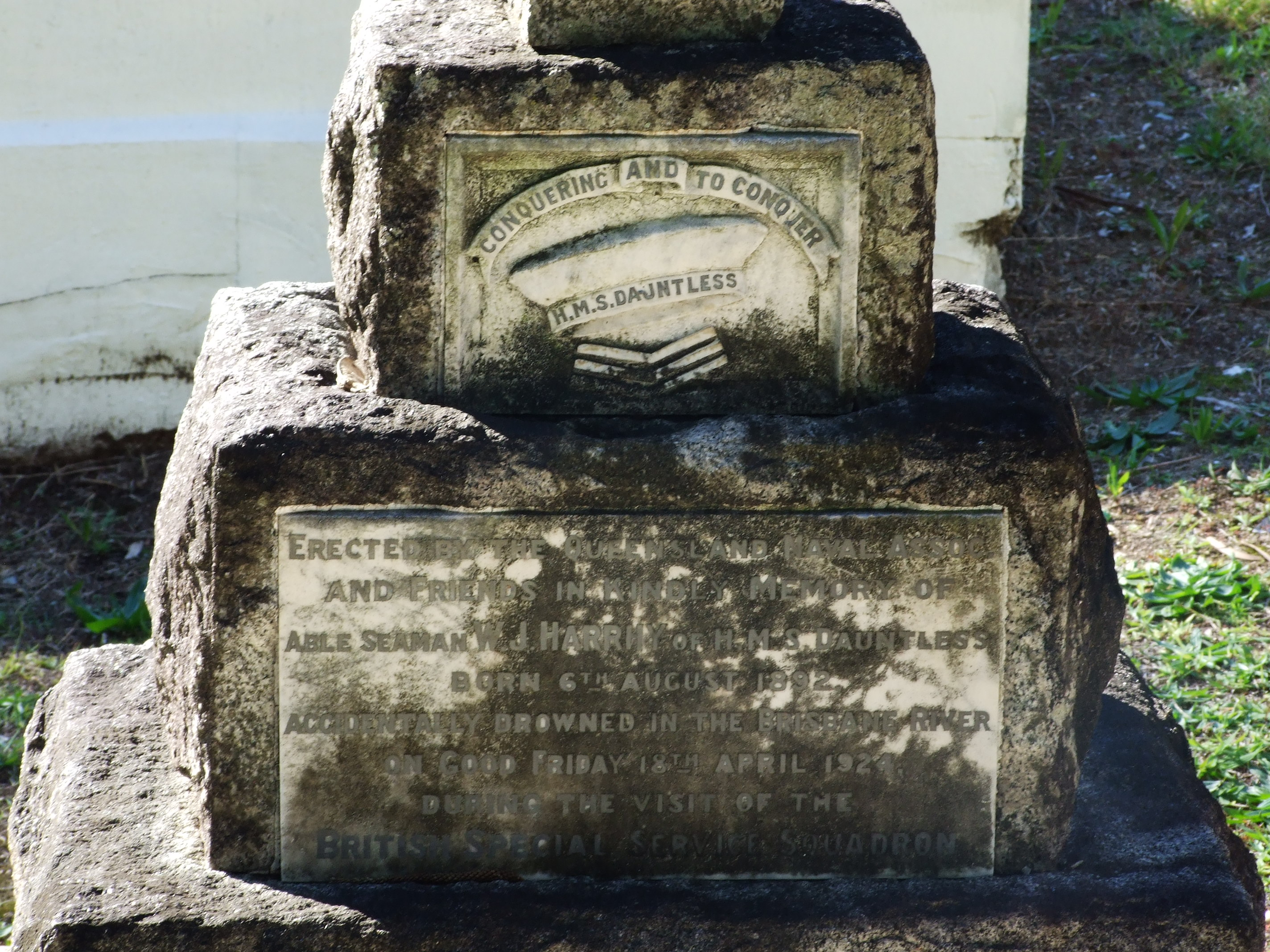
Headstone of Able Seaman William John Harrhy at Toowong Cemetery, Brisbane. Harrhy drowned in the Brisbane River when Dauntless was moored there as part of the Cruise of the Special Service Squadron.

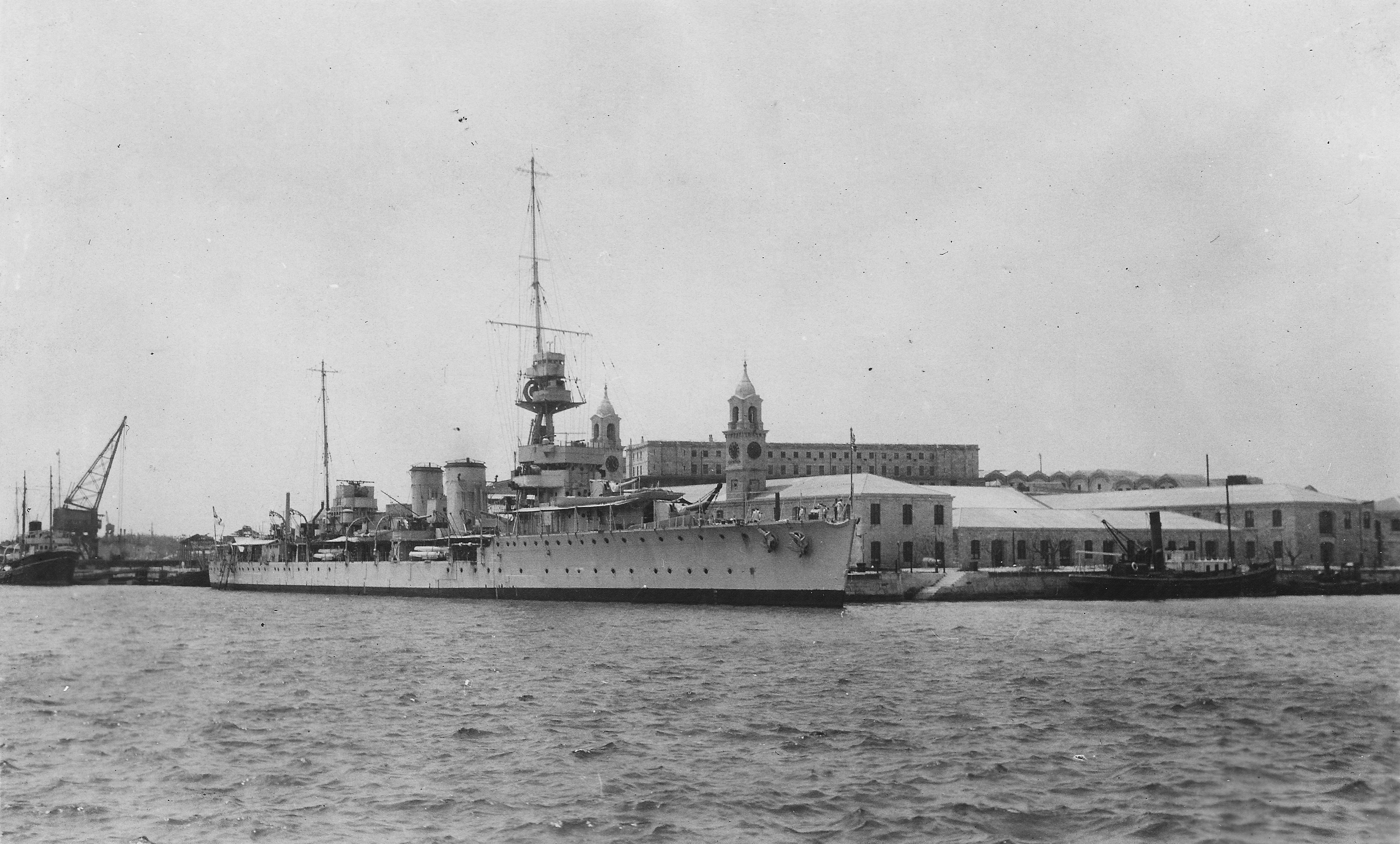
HMS Dauntless (D45) at the Royal Naval Dockyard, Bermuda ca 1930

Completed too late to see action in the First World War, in 1919 she was assigned to operate in the Baltic Sea against the Bolshevik revolutionaries in Russia. She was then on detached service in the West Indies. Following this assignment she was attached to the 1st Light Cruiser Squadron of the Atlantic Fleet for the following five years. Dauntless was a member of the Cruise of the Special Service Squadron, also known as the 'Empire Cruise', of 1923/24. Following this tour, she went with the squadron to the Mediterranean for the next few years.

In 1928, as a result of the addition of South America to the geographic limits of the Royal Navy's North America and West Indies Station, the station was renamed the "America and West Indies Station", and in May 1928 Dauntless was recommissioned and transferred to the Station from the Mediterranean, based at the Royal Naval Dockyard in the Imperial fortress colony of Bermuda, to augment the vessels of the 8th Light Cruiser Station. South American waters had previously been patrolled by the and the Pacific Station (abolished in 1905) and the "South American Squadron" of the South East Coast of America Station, withdrawn due to financial constraints in 1921, since when the British flag had been shown there only by special visits (such as during the world cruise of the First Cruiser Squadron in 1924 or by HMS Repulse, or during the March to October, 1925, tour of Africa and South America by the Prince of Wales'), or by detaching a ship from the North America and West Indies Station. She ran aground on 2 July 1928 on the Thrum Cap Shoal, 5 nautical miles (9.3 km) off Halifax, Nova Scotia, Canada, and was badly damaged, suffering the breach of her engine room and of one of her boiler rooms. She was abandoned by most of her 462 crew, the officers remaining on board. Subsequently all of her guns and torpedo tubes and much of her other equipment had to be removed to lighten her. She was finally refloated on 11 July 1928 and towed off by her sister ship HMS Despatch and a number of tugs. She was repaired throughout 1929 and was reduced to the reserve.

In 1930 she was transferred back to the America and West Indies Station. During 1931-1933 she served with the South American Division (of the America and West Indies Station), and in 1934 she relieved the cruiser Curlew in the Mediterranean and was reassigned to the 3rd Cruiser Squadron. In 1935 she returned to Britain to be paid off into the reserve.

== Wartime career ==
On the outbreak of the Second World War, Dauntless was recommissioned and joined the 9th Cruiser Squadron with the South Atlantic Command. In December, the squadron, including Dauntless, was transferred to the China Station, and in March 1940 Dauntless operated as a unit of the British Malaya Force while in the Indian Ocean. She operated mainly off Batavia, keeping watch on German merchant ships in the Dutch East Indies harbours. On 15 June 1941 she collided with the cruiser Emerald off Malacca and had to put into Singapore for repairs, that were eventually completed on 15 August.

In February 1942 Dauntless returned to Britain, and underwent a refit at Portsmouth. Following this, she was transferred to the Eastern Fleet, and in November was docked in the Selborne dry dock at Simonstown, South Africa, until January 1943. She was then used as a training ship, and in February 1945 was again reduced to the reserve.

She was sold to be broken up for scrap on 13 February 1946, and in April that year was broken up at the yards of Thos. W. Ward, of Inverkeithing.

== Publications ==
- Campbell, N.J.M. (1980). "Great Britain". In Chesneau, Roger (ed.). Conway's All the World's Fighting Ships 1922–1946. Mayflower Books. pp. 2–85. ISBN 0-8317-0303-2.
- Colledge, J. J.; Warlow, Ben (2006) [1969]. Ships of the Royal Navy: The Complete Record of All Fighting Ships of the Royal Navy from the 15th Century to the Present (3rd Rev ed.). London: Chatham Publishing. ISBN 978-1-86176-281-8. OCLC 67375475.
- Dodson, Aidan (2026). "The Cadet Training Ships of the Royal Navy". In Jordan, John (ed.). Warship 2026. Osprey Publishing. pp. 156–174. ISBN 978-1-4728-7259-3.
- Friedman, Norman (2010). British Cruisers: Two World Wars and After. Seaforth Publishing. ISBN 978-1-59114-078-8.
- Raven, Alan & Roberts, John (1980). British Cruisers of World War Two. Annapolis, Maryland: Naval Institute Press. ISBN 0-87021-922-7.
- Rohwer, Jürgen (2005). Chronology of the War at Sea 1939–1945: The Naval History of World War Two (Third Revised ed.). Naval Institute Press. ISBN 1-59114-119-2.
- Whitby, Michael (2020). "On Barren, Hideous Rocks: The Grounding of HMS Dauntless, July 1928". In Jordan, John (ed.). Warship 2020. Osprey. pp. 167–179. ISBN 978-1-4728-4071-4.
- Whitley, M. J. (1995). Cruisers of World War Two: An International Encyclopedia. Cassell. ISBN 1-86019-874-0.
- Zolandez, Thomas (2004). "Question 6/01: Japanese WW II Spy". Warship International. XLI (1): 33–34. ISSN 0043-0374.
