= New Zealand Division of the Royal Navy =

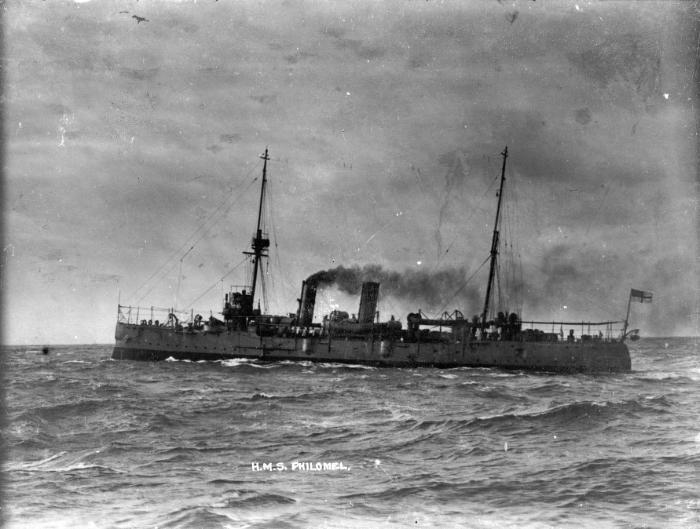
- The cruiser HMS Philomel, "Cradle of the Navy"
- Active: 1921–1941
- Country: United Kingdom
- Branch: Royal Navy
- Type: Military formation
- Engagements: World War II; American Theater; Battle of the River Plate

The New Zealand Division of the Royal Navy also known as the New Zealand Station was formed in 1921 and remained in existence until 1941. It was the precursor to the Royal New Zealand Navy. Originally, the Royal Navy was solely responsible for the naval security of New Zealand. The passing of the Naval Defence Act 1913 created the New Zealand Naval Forces as a separate division within the Royal Navy.

== History ==
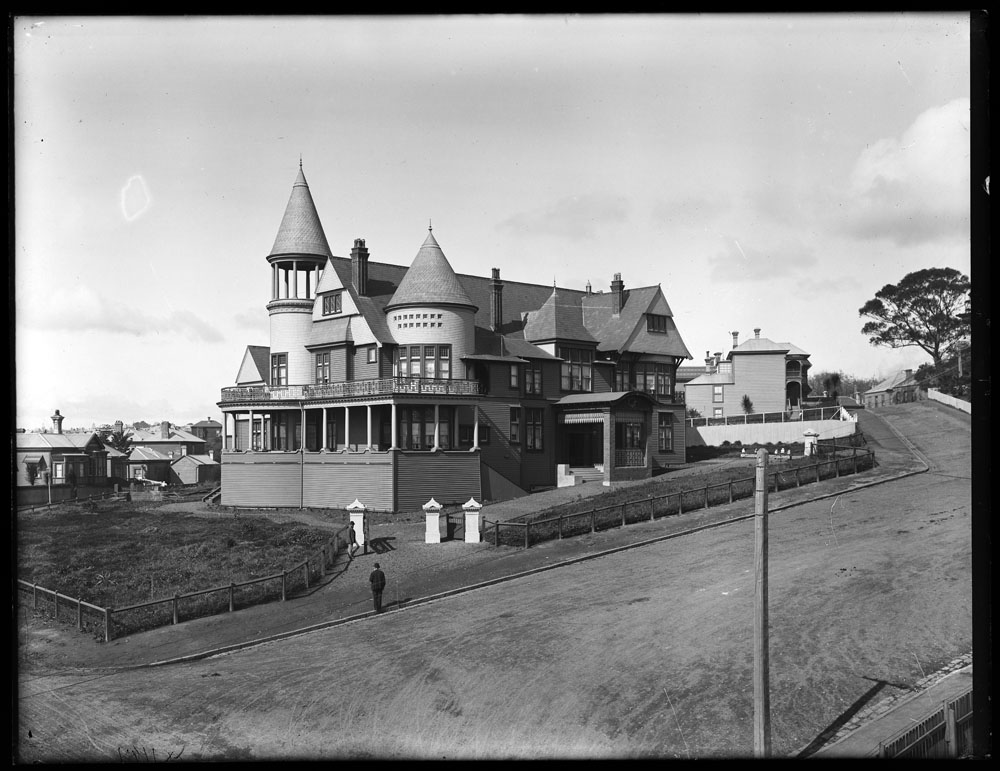
Admiralty House, Auckland, used from 1902 to 1903 when it became the Glenalvon Hotel: it was demolished in 1915

At its establishment in 1848, the Australia Station encompassed Australia and New Zealand. Under the Australasian Naval Agreement 1887 the colonial governments of Australia and New Zealand secured a greater naval presence in their waters, agreed that two ships would always be based in New Zealand waters and agreed contributions to funding that presence.

In 1901 the Commonwealth of Australia became independent of the United Kingdom. The Australian Squadron was disbanded in 1911 and the Australia Station passed to the Commonwealth Naval Forces. The Australia Station was reduced to cover Australia and its island dependencies to the north and east, excluding New Zealand and its surrounds, which was transferred under the command of the Commander-in-Chief, China and called the New Zealand Naval Forces.

Captain Alan Hotham was appointed as Captain of HMS Chatham on 24 May 1920, and made Commodore, Second Class, in command of the NZ Naval Forces or New Zealand Station.

On 1 January 1921, the New Zealand Naval Forces, which had formerly been under the command of the China Station, were renamed the New Zealand Division of the Royal Navy.

Captain Hotham was also appointed First Naval Member of the New Zealand Naval Board. In the 1923 New Zealand Birthday Honours, he was made a Companion of the Order of the Bath, in recognition of valuable services rendered in organising, recruiting, and training for the New Zealand Division, and as naval adviser to the New Zealand Government. His appointment in New Zealand expired in July 1923, when he returned to the Admiralty.

The light cruiser HMS Philomel had had a significant association with New Zealand since the creation of the New Zealand Naval Forces. The ship was worked hard during the first years of the First World War. By the end of 1916, her engines were giving trouble and her stern glands were worn out. A lengthy and costly refit was required. To avoid this, and the cost for a ship which was nearly at the end of her operational life, the Admiralty decided to give her to New Zealand. She was dispatched there to be paid off. The ship arrived in Wellington Harbour in March 1917. A large portion of her Royal Navy crew were returned to England to be assigned elsewhere. Armament removed, Philomel was recommissioned as a depot ship in Wellington, supporting minesweeping operations until May 1919.

In March 1921, on the creation of the Royal Navy's New Zealand Division, Philomel was recommissioned as a training ship. She steamed from her berth at Wellington to the dockyard at the Devonport Naval Base in Auckland. Moored alongside the training jetty, she was operated as a new recruit training ship, under the command of a series of officers from the Royal Navy including, for nearly six months in 1923, Commander Augustus Agar VC. Training armament was installed and in 1925, her boilers and engines were removed to create more accommodation space. Further accommodation, in the form of wooden cabins, was later constructed on her deck. In October 1941, on the creation of the Royal New Zealand Navy, Philomel was recommissioned as the training base HMNZS Philomel.

The division was funded by Wellington and increasingly manned by New Zealanders. It operated 14 ships over a period of 21 years, including the cruisers HMS Achilles and HMS Leander, the training minesweeper HMS Wakakura, and the cruiser HMS Philomel which was recommissioned as a base training establishment.

In 1922, the crew of Chatham donated a cup to the New Zealand Football Association. This became the Chatham Cup, New Zealand's equivalent of the British FA Cup, and its premier knockout football trophy.

Veronica assisted survivors in the aftermath of the 1931 Hawke's Bay earthquake in New Zealand. Having berthed in the Port of Napier only three hours before the earthquake, she radioed Auckland for help, which was provided by the light cruisers Dunedin and Diomede. She was subsequently docked for inspection for possible bottom damage as the seabed had risen up under her.

From 1932 to 1938 the Royal Navy's activities in New Zealand were under a rear-admiral; Rear-Admiral Fischer Watson from 1932-35.

In August 1937 HMS Leander, on a journey from Europe to New Zealand, carried out an aerial survey of Henderson, Oeno and Ducie Islands, in the south-east Pacific, east of the International Date Line. On each island, a British flag was planted and an inscription was nailed up proclaiming: "This island belongs to H.B.M. King George VI."

The New Zealand-crewed cruiser HMS Achilles fought at the Battle of the River Plate in late 1939.

The Commodore's appointment was abolished and forces brought directly under the New Zealand Chief of the Naval Staff from October 1940. The New Zealand Division of the Royal Navy became the Royal New Zealand Navy (RNZN) from 1 October 1941.

=== Advent of the Royal New Zealand Navy ===
When Britain went to war against Germany in 1939, New Zealand promptly declared war and expanded its naval forces. In recognition that the naval force was now largely self-sufficient and independent of the Royal Navy, the New Zealand Division of the Royal Navy became the Royal New Zealand Navy (RNZN) in 1941. There were:

- 2 Cruisers
- 2 Escort Vessels
- 1 Survey Vessel
- 1 Minesweeping Vessel

The prefix "royal" was granted by King George VI on 1 October 1941 and ships thereafter were prefixed with HMNZS (His/Her Majesty's New Zealand Ship).

== Ships of the New Zealand Division ==
Sortable list covering the period from the inception of the New Zealand Division of the Royal Navy in 1921 to the formation of the Royal New Zealand Navy on 1 October 1941.

Image	Name	Pennant	Class	Type	Com	Decom	Fate/notes
	HMS Achilles	70	Cruiser	Leander class	1936	1941	1941–1946 was HMNZS Achilles in the RNZN
	HMS Auckland	L61	Convoy sloop	Egret class	1938	1939	Nominated only.
	HMS Chatham		Cruiser	Town class	1920	1924	Replaced by Dunedin in 1924
	HMS Diomede	D92	Cruiser	Danae class	1926	1935	Replaced by Achilles in 1936
	HMS Dunedin	D93	Cruiser	Danae class	1924	1937	Replaced by Leander in 1937
	HMS Laburnum	T48	Convoy sloop	Acacia class	1922	1935	Flower-class sloop
	HMS Leander		Cruiser	Leander class	1937	1941	1941–1944 was HMNZS Leander in the RNZN
	HMS Leith	L36	Convoy sloop	Grimsby class	1934	1939	Acquired by the Royal Danish Navy in 1949 and renamed HDMS Galathea. Circumnavigated the world in 1950–52 doing deep-sea oceanographic research.
	RFA Nucula	L61	Fleet oiler		1924	1937	oil hulk 1937–1947
	HMS Philomel		Cruiser	Pearl class	1921	1941	"Cradle of the Navy." 1914–1921 was HMS Philomel in the NZ Naval Forces. 1941–1947 became HMNZS Philomel in the RNZN
	HMS Puriri	T02	Minesweeper	Converted merchant ship	1941	1941	14 May 1941 struck a German mine nine miles (14 km) northeast of the Whangarei heads and sank with the loss of five crew members.
	HMS Torch		Convoy sloop		1921	1924	1914–1921 was HMS Torch in the NZ Naval Forces. Also called a gunboat. Wrecked in Chatham Islands.
	HMS Veronica	T67	Convoy sloop	Acacia class	1920	1934	Flower-class sloop
	HMS Wellington	U65	Convoy sloop	Grimsby class	1935	1947	Survives as a museum ship moored on the River Thames, London.
	HMS Wakakura	T00	Minesweeper	Castle class	1926	1941	1941–1945 was HMNZS Wakakura in the RNZN

== Commanders ==
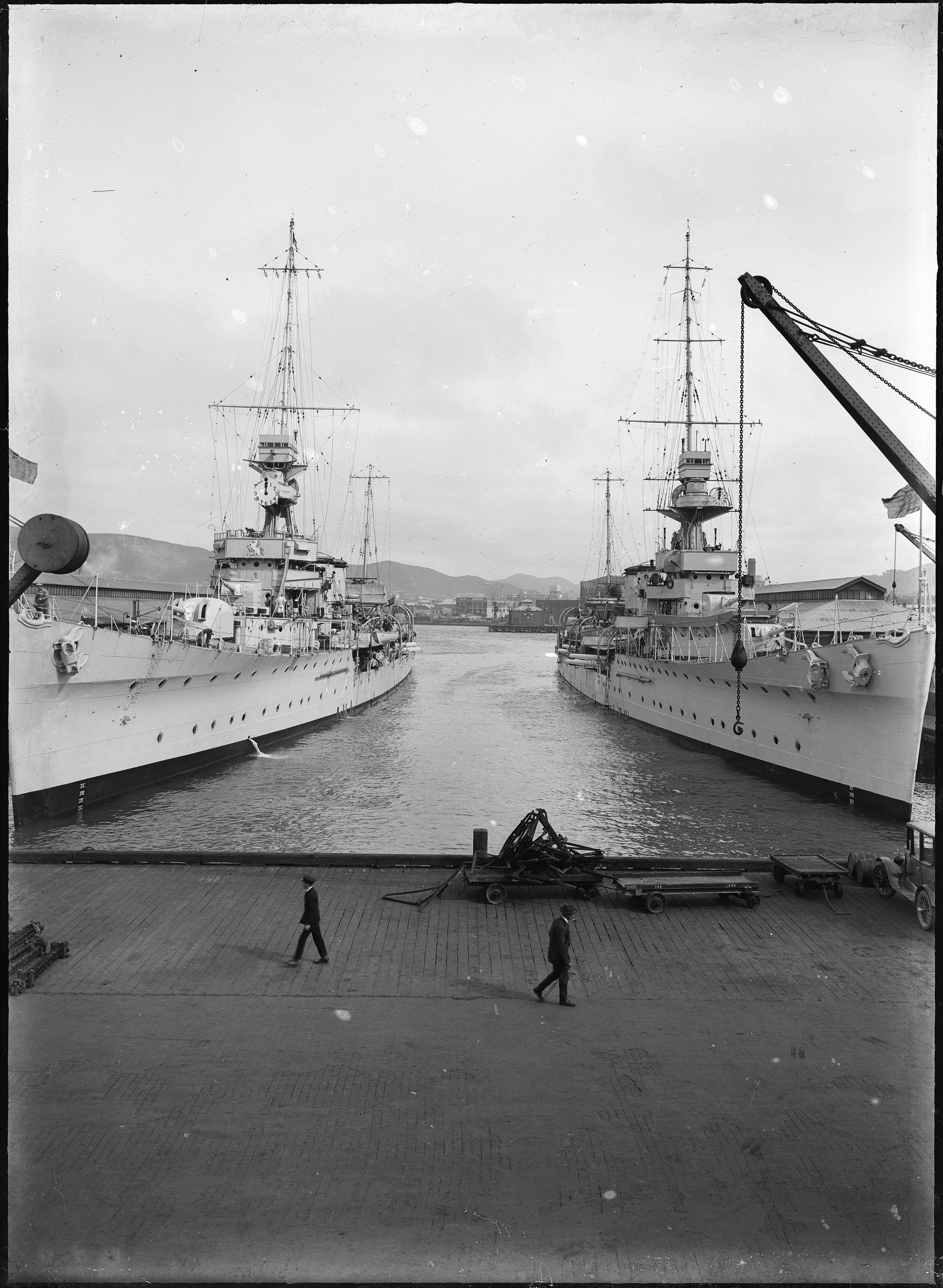
HMS Diomede and HMS Dunedin berthed in Wellington, ca 1928

Officers who commanded the New Zealand Division/Station include:

Rank	Name	Title	Term began
Commodore	Alan Hotham		March 1921
Commodore	Alister Beal, CMG, DSO		August 1923
Commodore	George Swabey, DSO		18 June 1926
Commodore	Geoffrey Blake, CB, DSO		19 July 1929
Rear Admiral	Fischer Watson, DSO		26 February 1932
Rear Admiral	The Hon. Edmund Drummond, MVO		March 1935
Commodore	Irvine Glennie		June 1938
Commodore	James Rivett-Carnac	CO HMNZS Leander & Commodore Commanding New Zealand Squadron	December 1938
Commodore	Henry Horan, DSC	First Naval Member	December 1939
Commodore	Edward Parry	First Naval Member of New Zealand Naval Board	May 1940 - October 1940

Irvine Glennie had the following posts:

- 24.03.1936 - 08.06.1938 Commanding Officer, HMNZS Achilles (cruiser) & Flag Captain to Rear-Admiral Commanding New Zealand Station
- 08.06.1938 - 01.1939 Promoted to Commodore, 2nd Class. Commanding Officer, HMNZS Achilles (cruiser) & till 14.11.1938 Commodore Commanding New Zealand Squadron

As of 22 April 1938, Captain Henry Horan was appointed a Commodore, 2nd class, and had the posts of:

- 22.04.1938 - 07.06.1938 Commodore Commanding New Zealand Station & First Naval Member of Naval Board (HMS Achilles)
- 08.06.1938 - 31.12.1940 Chief of Naval Staff, New Zealand, and First Naval Member of the Naval Board [Navy Office, Wellington]
- 01.01.1940 - 30.04.1940 Chief of Naval Staff and First Naval Member of Naval Board and Commodore Commanding New Zealand Squadron (HMNZS Leander)

After October 1940, Commodore Parry became the first Chief of Naval Staff and First Naval Member from October 1941 to June 1942.
