= Charles Speight =

Charles Speight may refer to:

- Charles Speight (businessman) (1865–1928), New Zealand brewer and businessman
- Charles Speight (rugby union) (1870–1935), New Zealand rugby union player and local politician
