= Fischer Watson =

Royal Navy Rear Admiral (1884 – 1960)

Rear-Admiral Fischer Watson CBE DSO*
- Born: 3 September 1884; Langport, England
- Died: 14 August 1960 (aged 75); Chichester, England
- Military career
- Allegiance: United Kingdom
- Branch: Royal Navy
- Service years: 1899–1935; 1939–1945
- Rank: Rear-Admiral
- Commands: New Zealand Division; HMS Nelson; HMS Caledon; HMS Velox; HMS Shakespeare; HMS Tempest; HMS Loyal
- Conflicts: First World War; Second World War
- Awards: Commander of the Order of the British Empire; Distinguished Service Order & Bar; Mention in Despatches (3)

Rear-Admiral Fischer Burges Watson, CBE, DSO & Bar (3 September 1884 – 14 August 1960) was a Royal Navy officer who served as commander-in-chief of the New Zealand Division.

== Naval career ==
Born the eldest son of Rear-Admiral Burges Watson and Marie Thérèse Fischer and educated at Ashdown House and the Royal Naval College, Dartmouth, Watson joined the Royal Navy as a cadet in 1899. In early June 1902 it was announced that he would be posted to HMS Magnificent, serving in the Channel Squadron, but the appointment was cancelled and later the same month he was posted as Midshipman on board the protected cruiser HMS Ariadne, about to become flagship on the North America and West Indies Station.

Watson served in the First World War as commanding officer of the destroyer HMS Loyal from the start of the war, of HMS Tempest from April 1917 and of HMS Shakespeare from September 1918. After the war he briefly commanded HMS Velox before being appointed assistant to chief of staff and maintenance captain at Portsmouth in 1920. He became commanding officer of the cruiser HMS Caledon in 1924, chief staff officer to the rear admiral-in-charge Gibraltar in 1926 and naval assistant to the second sea lord in 1928. He went on to be commanding officer of the battleship HMS Nelson in 1930 and commander-in-chief of the New Zealand Division in 1932. He retired in 1935 but was recalled in 1939 at the start of the Second World War during which he served on the staff of the commander-in-chief Western Approaches before becoming commodore of ocean convoys in October 1940, senior officer for landing ship tank flotilla in the Mediterranean Fleet in April 1943 and senior naval officer at Selsey in May 1944. He last appointment was as flag officer-in-charge at Harwich in September 1944 before retiring again in 1945.

In 1935, Watson was awarded the King George V Silver Jubilee Medal.

== Rugby union ==
Watson was capped twice for England in rugby union, playing matches in the 1908 and 1909 Home Nations, as a forward.

== Family ==
In 1909 he married Sybil Mona Caroline Holden; they had three daughters. Following the death of his first wife he married Mabel Harford Underwood in 1931.

Military offices
Preceded by Geoffrey Blake	Commander-in-Chief, New Zealand Division; 1932–1935	Succeeded by Edmund Drummond
