= 1926 Birthday Honours (New Zealand) =

Awards list for New Zealand

The 1926 King's Birthday Honours in New Zealand, celebrating the official birthday of King George V, were appointments made by the King on the recommendation of the New Zealand government to various orders and honours to reward and highlight good works by New Zealanders. They were announced on 3 July 1926.

The recipients of honours are displayed here as they were styled before their new honour.

== Knight Bachelor ==
- Charles Holdsworth – managing director of the Union Steamship Company of New Zealand Limited. In recognition of his services in the development of New Zealand.
- The Honourable Charles Ernest Statham – speaker of the House of Representatives.
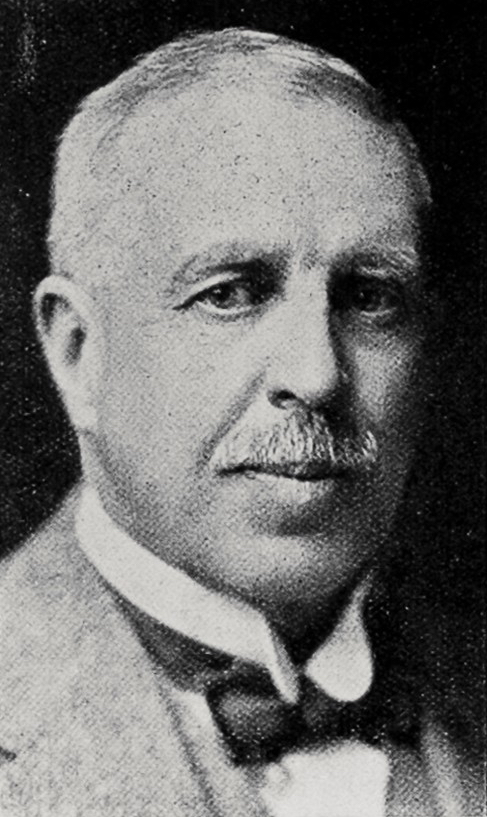
Sir Charles Holdsworth

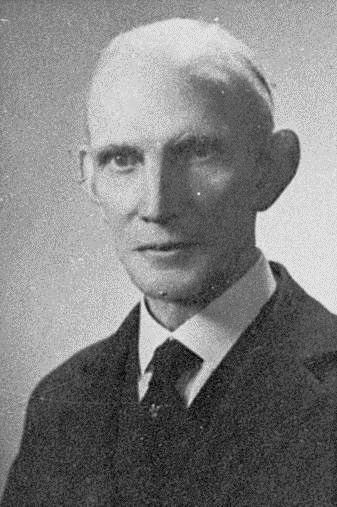
Sir Charles Statham

== Order of the Bath ==
=== Companion (CB) ===
Military division

- Captain (Commodore 2nd class) Alister Francis Beal CMG ADC RN – commodore commanding the New Zealand Division of the Royal Navy, and naval advisor to the New Zealand government.
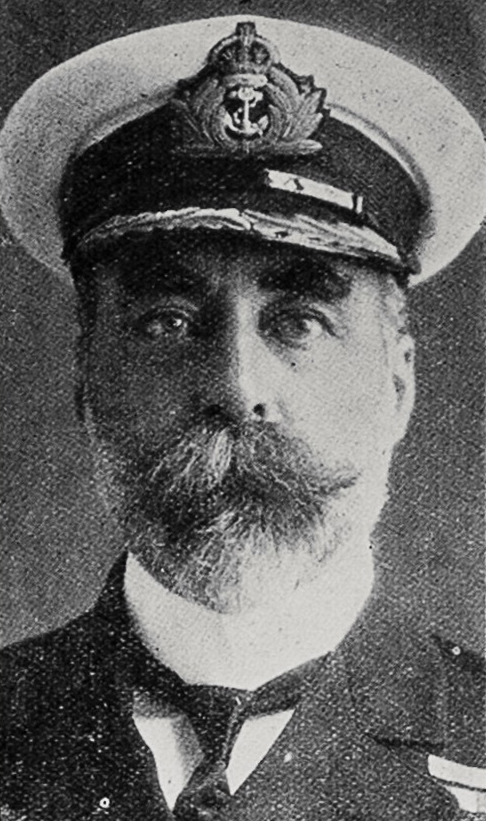
Alister Beal

== Order of Saint Michael and Saint George ==
=== Companion (CMG) ===
- John Sutherland Ross – of Dunedin; chairman of directors of the New Zealand and South Seas International Exhibition.
- Harold Livingstone Tapley MP – mayor of the City of Dunedin, and a director of the New Zealand and South Seas International Exhibition.
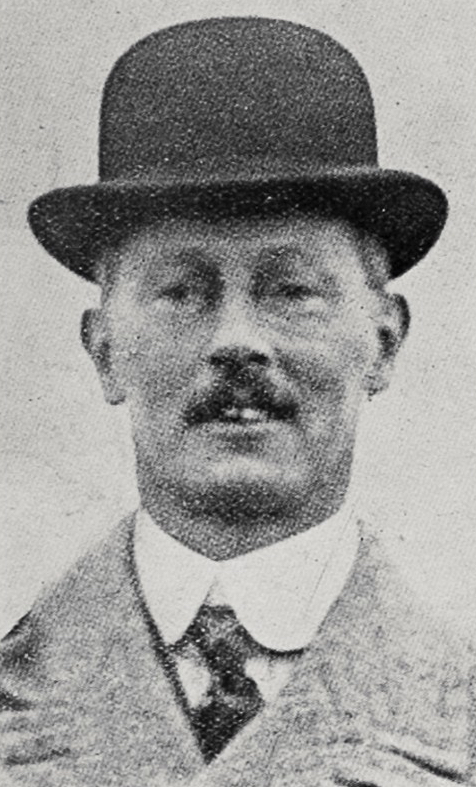
John Ross

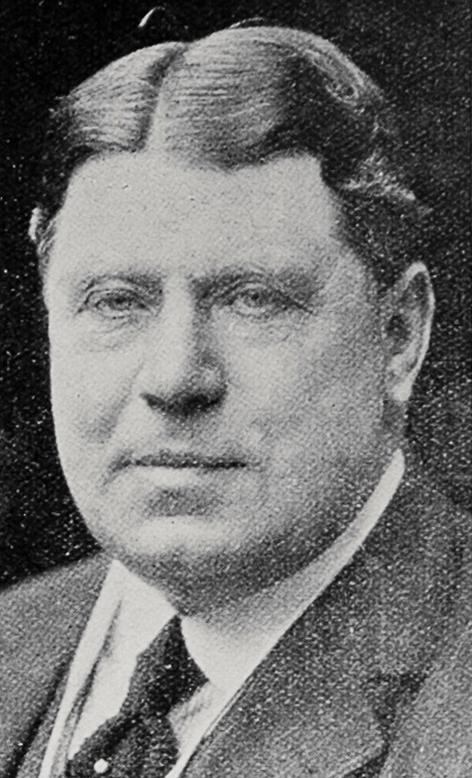
Harold Tapley

== Order of the British Empire ==
=== Dame Grand Cross (GBE) ===
- Christina Allen Massey CBE – of Wellington. For services to New Zealand.
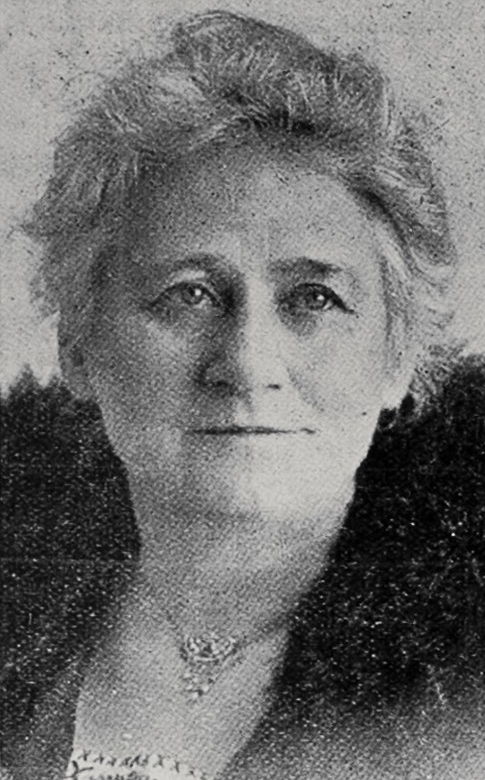
Dame Christina Massey

=== Commander (CBE) ===
Civil division

- Samuel Hurst Seager FRIBA – of Christchurch; a prominent architect.
- Charles Speight – of Dunedin; vice-chairman of the New Zealand and South Seas International Exhibition.
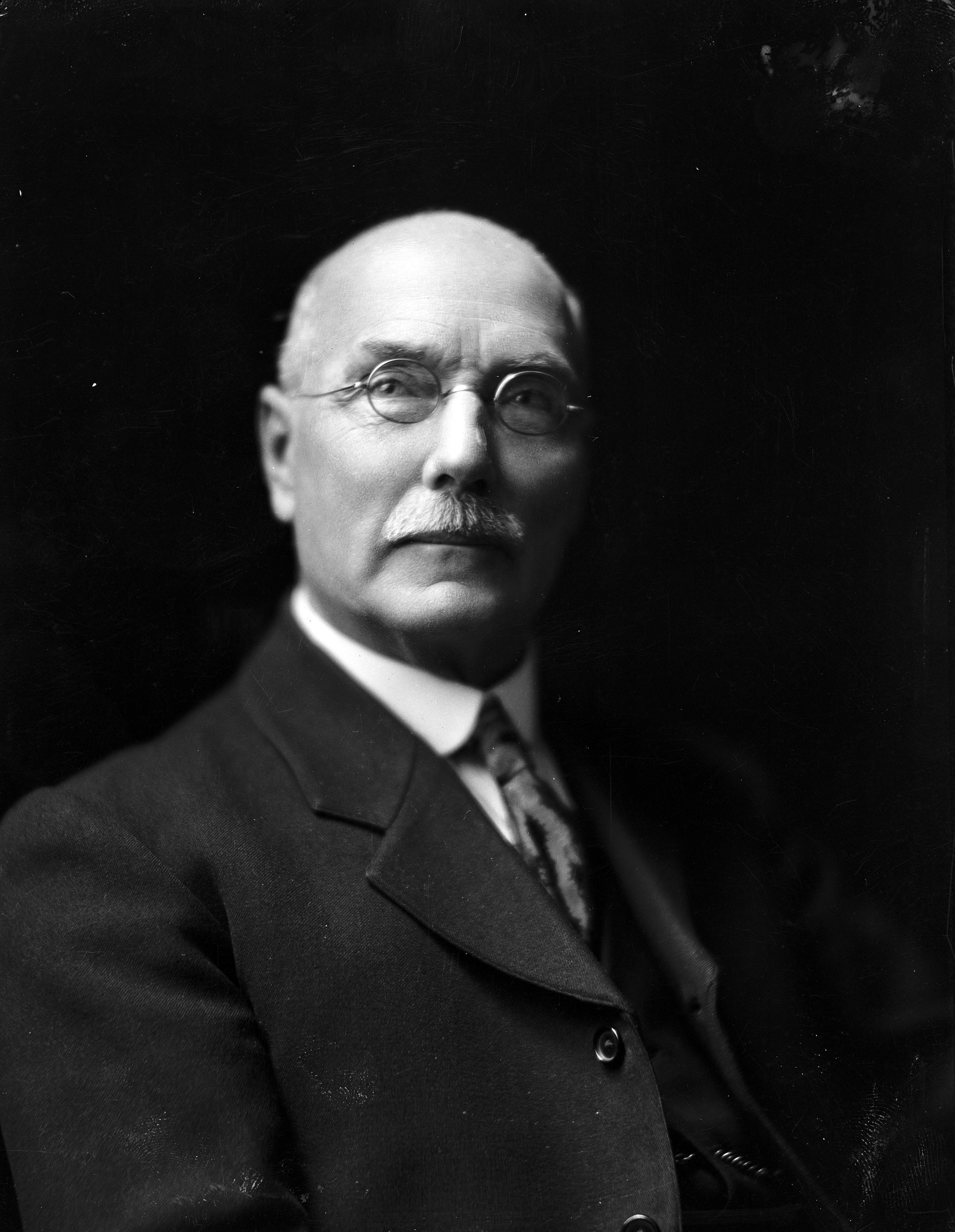
Samuel Hurst Seager

== Companion of the Imperial Service Order (ISO) ==
- Robert Edward Hayes – of Wellington; secretary to the Treasury.
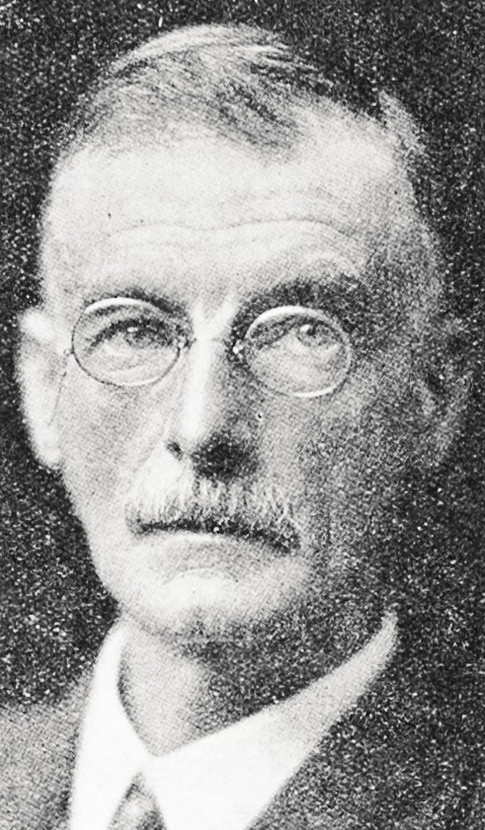
Robert Edward Hayes
