= Henry Horan =

Rear-Admiral Henry Horan CB DSC
- Born: 12 August 1890; Newcastle West, County Limerick, UK
- Died: 15 August 1961 (aged 71); Haslar, England
- Military career
- Allegiance: United Kingdom
- Branch: Royal Navy
- Service years: 1910–1941
- Rank: Rear-Admiral
- Commands: HMS Coventry; HMS Barham; New Zealand Division
- Conflicts: World War I World War II
- Awards: Companion of the Order of the Bath; Distinguished Service Cross

Rear-Admiral Henry Edward Horan CB DSC (12 August 1890 – 15 August 1961) was an Irish Royal Navy officer who became Commander-in-Chief of the New Zealand Division.

== Early life and education ==
Horan was born in Newcastle West, County Limerick to John Horan, a civil engineer, and Elizabeth Hannah Barker. He was educated at Stubbington House School. He entered Britannia Royal Naval College at Dartmouth in January 1906.

== Naval career ==
Horan entered the Royal Navy in 1910 and served in World War I taking part in the Battle of Heligoland Bight in 1914. He was appointed Commanding Officer of the cruiser HMS Coventry in 1931, Senior Naval Member on the Directing Staff at the Imperial Defence College in October 1935 and Commanding Officer of the battleship HMS Barham in 1937.

He also served in World War II as Commander-in-Chief of the New Zealand Division from December 1939 to April 1940 before retiring in 1941. In early retirement he served as a staff officer in Combined Operations Headquarters in Richmond Terrace, London. He was made a CB in the New Year Honours 1947.

Military offices
Preceded by James Rivett-Carnac	Commander-in-Chief, New Zealand Division; 1939–1940	Succeeded by Edward Parry
