= Irvine Glennie =

Royal Navy Admiral (1892–1980)

Admiral Sir Irvine Glennie KCB
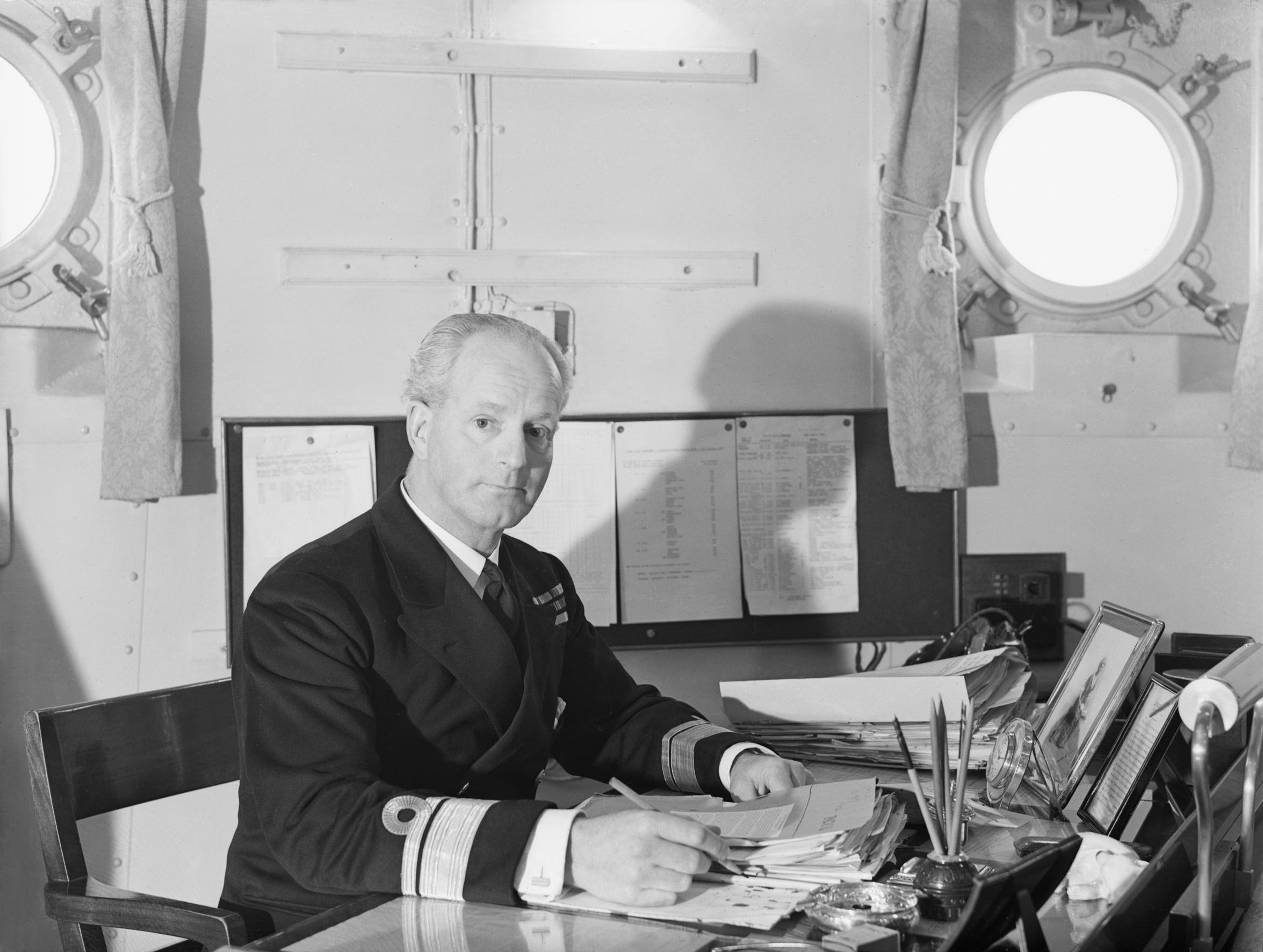
- Rear Admiral Glennie on board HMS Tyne when Rear Admiral (Destroyers), Home Fleet
- Born: 22 July 1892; Scotland
- Died: 8 September 1980 (aged 88); Lymington, Hampshire, England
- Military career
- Allegiance: United Kingdom
- Branch: Royal Navy
- Service years: 1905–1947
- Rank: Admiral
- Commands: America and West Indies Station (1944–45); HMS Hood (1939–41); New Zealand Division (1938); HMNZS Achilles (1936–39); HMS Blanche (1932–34); HMS Wishart (1927–28); HMS Westminster (1925–27)
- Conflicts: First World War; Second World War
- Awards: Knight Commander of the Order of the Bath; Mentioned in Despatches

Admiral Sir Irvine Gordon Glennie, KCB (22 July 1892 – 8 September 1980) was a Royal Navy officer who served as Commander-in-Chief, America and West Indies Station.

== Naval career ==
Educated as an officer cadet at the Royal Naval College, Osborne, and the Royal Naval College, Dartmouth, Glennie joined the Royal Navy in 1905 and served in the First World War in the Home Fleet and in the Grand Fleet. He joined the staff at the Royal Naval College, Dartmouth, in 1922 and then commanded destroyers from 1925. He was appointed flag captain commanding HMNZS Achilles and chief of staff to the Rear-Admiral Commanding the New Zealand Station in 1936, before becoming Commodore Commanding New Zealand Squadron in 1938.

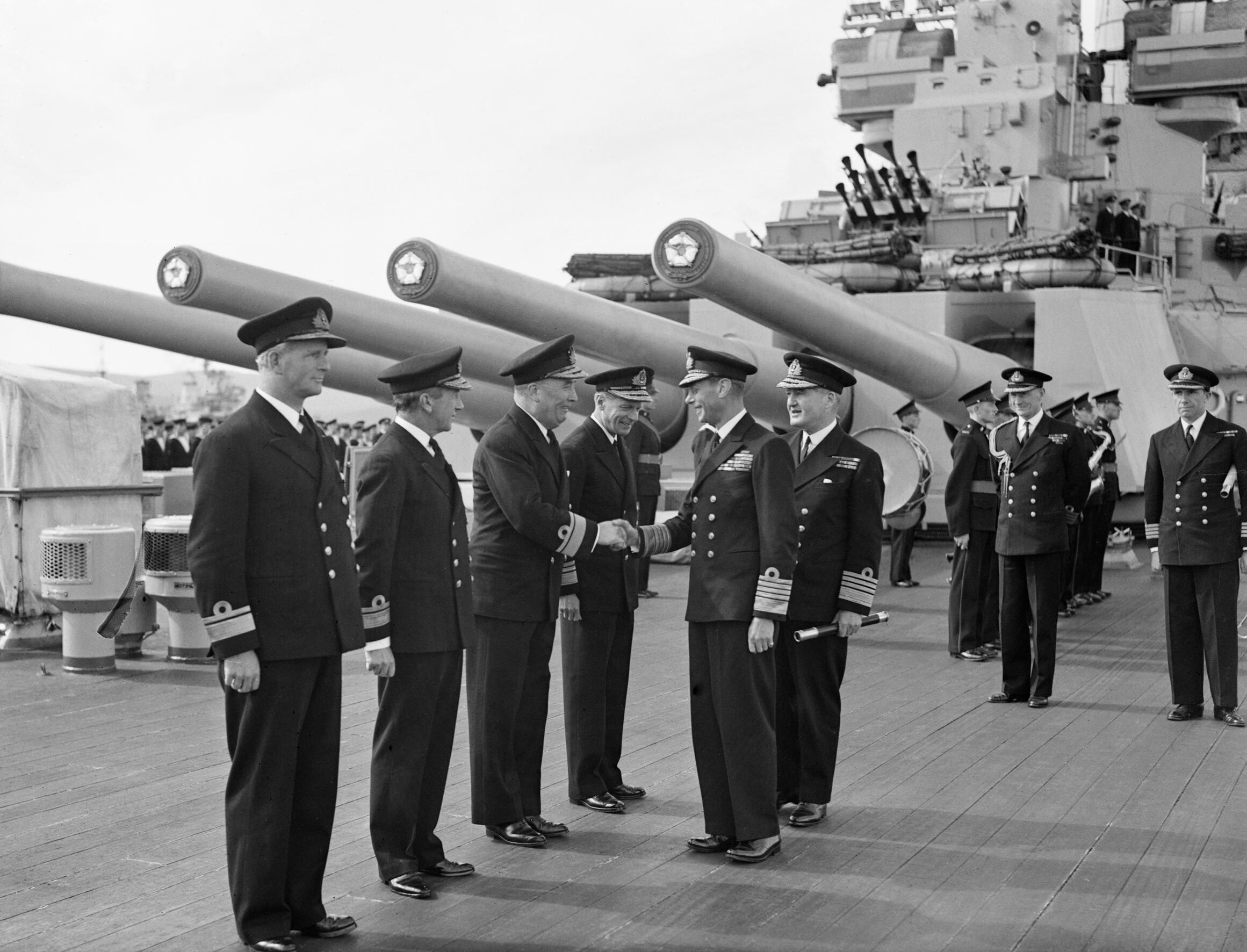
Rear Admiral Glennie, far left, meets King George VI aboard HMS Duke of York at Scapa Flow, August 1943

Glennie also served in the Second World War as flag captain commanding HMS Hood and chief of staff of the Battle Cruiser Squadron from 1939; it was in this capacity that he took part in the Attack on Mers-el-Kébir in July 1940. He then served as commander of destroyers in the Mediterranean Fleet from 1941, taking part in the Battle of Crete and preventing Axis troops from landing on that island in May 1941, before becoming commander of destroyers in the Home Fleet from 1943. He was made Senior Naval Officer, Western Atlantic, at Admiralty House, Bermuda, from 1944; this role was retitled the commander-in-chief of the America and West Indies Station in 1945. He welcomed President Harry S. Truman to Bermuda after the war, and retired in 1947.

Glennie died in 1980 at Lymington in Hampshire.

Military offices
Preceded by Edmund Drummond	Commander-in-Chief, New Zealand Division; June–December 1938	Succeeded by James Rivett-Carnac
Preceded by Sir Alban Curteis	Commander-in-Chief, America and West Indies Station; 1944–1945	Succeeded by Sir William Tennant
