= Geoffrey Blake (Royal Navy officer) =

Vice-Admiral Sir Geoffrey Blake KCB DSO
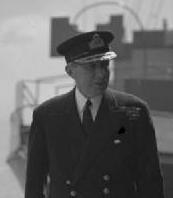
- Sir Geoffrey Blake
- Born: 16 September 1882; Alverstoke, Hampshire, England
- Died: 18 July 1968 (aged 85); Chelsea, London, England
- Military career
- Allegiance: United Kingdom
- Branch: Royal Navy
- Service years: 1897–1938; 1940–1945
- Rank: Vice-Admiral
- Commands: Battlecruiser Squadron (1936–37); New Zealand Division of the Royal Navy (1929–32); HMS Queen Elizabeth (1921–23)
- Conflicts: First World War; Second World War
- Awards: Knight Commander of the Order of the Bath; Distinguished Service Order; Mentioned in Despatches; Order of Saint Anna (Russia); Legion of Merit (United States)

Vice-Admiral Sir Geoffrey Blake, KCB, DSO (16 September 1882 – 18 July 1968) was an officer in the Royal Navy who served as Fourth Sea Lord from 1932 to 1935.

== Naval career ==
Blake was born at Alverstoke in Hampshire, the son of Thomas Blake and Fanny Leatry. As a boy, he attended Winchester College before entering the Royal Navy in 1897. He served in the First World War and at the Battle of Jutland, as gunnery commander aboard HMS Iron Duke.

In 1919, Blake was appointed naval attaché in Washington D. C., a position he held until 1921. He was then given command of HMS Queen Elizabeth, became Deputy Director of the Royal Navy Staff College in 1925 and was appointed director of the college in 1926. He was appointed Chief of Staff in the Atlantic Fleet in 1927 and First Member of the New Zealand Naval Board and Commodore commanding the New Zealand Division in 1929. He became Fourth Sea Lord and Chief of Supplies and Transport in 1932 and Vice Admiral commanding the Battlecruiser Squadron and second-in-command of the Mediterranean Fleet with his flag in HMS Hood in 1936.

Blake presided over the first board of enquiry into the sinking of Hood in 1941; the conduct of the inquiry was criticised as no verbatim record of witnesses' testimony was kept. A second inquiry was held, which came to the same conclusion although subsequently other theories have been advanced.

Blake also served in the Second World War as an Additional Assistant Chief of Naval Staff from 1940 and as Flag Officer, Liaison to the United States Navy in Europe from 1942 to 1945.

In retirement, Blake became Gentleman Usher of the Black Rod.

== Family ==
In 1911 Blake married Jean St. John Carr; they had two daughters, one of whom married the historian John Ehrman.

Military offices
Preceded by George Swabey	Commander-in-Chief, New Zealand Division; 1929–1932	Succeeded by Fischer Watson
Preceded by Sir Lionel Preston	Fourth Sea Lord; 1932–1935	Succeeded by Sir Percy Noble
Preceded by Sir Sidney Bailey	Commander, Battlecruiser Squadron; 1936–1937	Succeeded by Sir Andrew Cunningham
Government offices
Preceded by Sir William Mitchell	Black Rod; 1945–1949	Succeeded by Sir Brian Horrocks
