= Edmund Rupert Drummond =

Vice-Admiral The Honourable Edward Rupert Drummond CB MVO DL
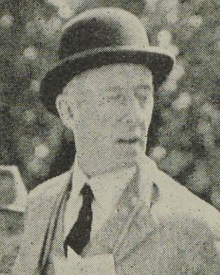
- Drummond in 1937
- Born: 8 May 1884
- Died: 9 September 1965 (aged 81)
- Spouse: Lady Evelyn Drummond (nee Butler)
- Children: Anne Drummond; Jean Constance Drummond; James Ralph Drummond
- Military career
- Allegiance: United Kingdom
- Branch: Royal Navy
- Rank: Vice-Admiral
- Commands: HMS Capetown; New Zealand Division
- Conflicts: World War I World War II
- Awards: Companion of the Order of the Bath; Member of the Royal Victorian Order; Commander of the Order of the Two Rivers (1934)

Vice-Admiral The Hon. Edmund Rupert Drummond CB MVO DL (8 May 1884 – 9 September 1965) was a Royal Navy officer who became Commander-in-Chief of the New Zealand Division.

== Early life and family ==
Drummond was the youngest son of James Drummond, 10th Viscount Strathallan and his second wife Margaret, Viscountess Strathallan (nee Smythe), daughter of William Smythe of Methven Castle. Drummond had one older half-brother from his father's first marriage, The Hon. William Huntly Drummond (later 11th Viscount Strathallan), as well four older siblings from his parents' union: James Eric Drummond (later 7th Earl of Perth and 12th Viscount Strathallan), Andrew Maurice Drummond, Margaret Cicely Drummond and Sybil Frances Drummond. Both his brother The Hon. Andrew Maurice Drummond his aunt The Hon. Frances Drummond served as a Page of Honour and Maid of honour respectively in the Household of Queen Victoria.

The family lived at Machany House in Perthshire, which had been historically used as the Dower house for the seat of the Viscounts Strathallan, Strathallan Castle. Drummond's father, the 10th Viscount Strathallan, died at Machany House in 1893, and Drummond's half brother William succeeded to the family titles and estates. His father's personal estate in England and Scotland was valued at £12,481 for probate in 1895.

During the early 1900s Strathallan Castle had been leased to Graeme Whitelaw M.P.. Following Whitelaw's departure from the district, in 1910 Drummond's older half-brother William Drummond, 11th Viscount Strathallan (who had also succeeded their seventh-cousin-twice-removed as Earl of Perth in 1902) sold the ancestral Strathmore Estates at Strathallan, Tullibardine, and Machany, which comprised 7,322 acres to industrialist Sir James Roberts, 1st Baronet.

Following the sale of the family's estates in 1910, Drummond's mother Margaret, Dowager Viscountess Strathallan vacated Machany House in March 1911; she and her two daughters had taken up permanent residence at No. 39 Elm Park Gardens in Chelsea, London by May 1911, where Margaret continued to live until her death in 1920. She died on 5 December 1920, leaving a personal estate of £10,166.

His older half-brother William, 6th Earl of Perth and 11th Viscount Strathallan, died in 1937, and was succeeded by Drummond's older brother Eric Drummond, 7th Earl of Perth.

== Naval career ==
Drummond was educated at the Royal Naval College Dartmouth; in 1906 he was promoted to the rank of lieutenant. He served in World War I as second in command of the cruiser HMS Caroline from 1914 and then as an officer in the cruiser HMS Cardiff from 1917.

Drummond served as the Chief Executive Officer of HMS Renown during the period of October 1921 to June 1922 when the ship was commissioned for an official tour of Japan and the Philippines undertaken by Edward, Prince of Wales, who later, as King, appointed Drummond as a Naval Aide-de-camp in June 1936.

He was appointed Commanding Officer of the cruiser HMS Capetown in 1927, Chief of Staff to the Commander-in-Chief, Portsmouth in 1930 and Chief of Staff to the Commander-in-Chief American and West Indies Station before becoming Commander-in-Chief of the New Zealand Division in 1935. He served in World War II as Captain of the Dockyard at Portland from August 1939 and as Chief of Staff to the Commander-in-Chief, Rosyth from 1942 until September 1945 when he retired.

== Marriage and descendants ==
In 1910 he married Evelyn Frances Butler, eldest daughter of Lord Arthur Butler (later 4th Marquess of Ormonde) and Chicago heiress Ellen, Lady Arthur Butler, with whom he had three children:

- Anne Drummond (1911 - 1985) married (1) in 1930 to Capt. Charles Michael Stratton (2) in 1941 to Lt. Col. Lawrence Bickmore (3) in 1947 to Lt. Col. Ian Arthur Murray (divorced in 1957), and (4) in 1964 to Brigadier James Charles Windsor-Lewis (who died in 1964).
  - John Mark Stratton (b. 1931) who was married in 1961 to Diana Smith (daughter of Eric Smith M.P. and granddaughter of Sir Everard Hambro)
    - James Michael Stratton (b. 1963)
    - Kate Miranda Stratton (b. 1965)
    - Andrew Eric Mark Stratton (b. 1968)
  - Margaret Anne Stratton (b. 1933) married (1) in 1961 to Richard Fortescue, 7th Earl Fortescue (divorced in 1987), and (2) in 1988 to Maj. Jocelyn Olaf Hambro.
    - Lady Laura Fortescue (b. 1962)
    - Lady Sarah Fortescue (b. 1963)
  - Peter Christopher Bickmore (b. 1943) who married Isabel FitzAlan-Howard, daughter of Lord Michael Fitzalan-Howard
- Jean Constance Drummond (1914 - 1997) married in 1947 to Lt. Col. Walter George Finney
  - Sarah Anne Finney (b. 1948) who married Giles Philip Curtis in 1971.
  - Rachel Mary Finney (b. 1950) who married John Jeremy Windham (son of Sir Ralph Winham) in 1976.
  - Elizabeth Jean Finney (b. 1952) who married Andrew William Kennedy Merriam (grandson of Sir Laurence Merriam) in 1979.
- James Ralph Drummond (1918 - 1944) (presumed dead following the disappearance of HMS Sickle)

Following Drummond's father-in-law's succession as Marquess of Ormonde in 1919, his wife Evelyn became known as Lady Evelyn Drummond.

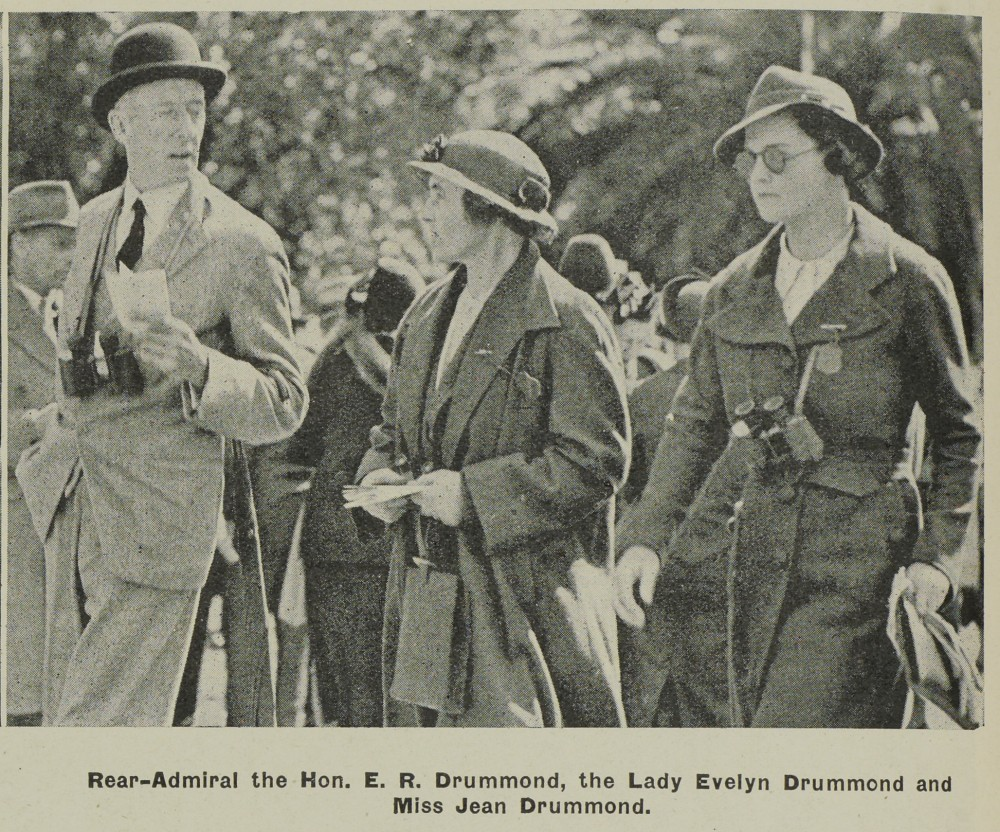
Rear-Admiral Edmund Rupert Drummond with his wife and daughter

== Personal life ==
Drummond's wife Lady Evelyn served as a First Officer (equivalent to the rank of Lieutenant Commander) in the Women's Royal Naval Service at Bletchley Park during the Second World War. Lady Evelyn was described as "one of a remarkable collection of junior officers," inspected in 1941 by WRNS Director Vera Laughton Mathews in the latter's memoir Blue Tapestry.

=== Residences ===
The 1921 United Kingdom census records that Capt. Drummond and Lady Evelyn Drummond lived at Blackbrook Grove in Fareham, Hampshire. Their household included a domestic Nurse, Housekeeper, Cook, Nurserymaid, Parlour maid, Kitchen maid, and two gardeners. Blackbrook Grove was later purchased in 1927 by the newly-created Anglican Diocese of Portsmouth as an official residence for the Bishop of Portsmouth, and the house was renamed Bishopswood.

The couple's electoral roll address from the period of c. 1918 - 1920 was the home of his mother, Margaret, Dowager Viscountess Strathallan, at No. 39 Elm Park Gardens in Chelsea, London. The couple were living at Elm Park Gardens in November 1919; records survive of an advertisement for a domestic maid made by Lady Evelyn in The Times, which noted that six maids were kept in the household. By 1924 their London address was 21 Moreton Terrace in Pimlico, Westminster. During the 1930s the couple lived at The Old Manor in Fareham, although the house was leased in 1934, and again from 1935–38 when Drummond was stationed in New Zealand.

The couple were close with Scottish Noblewoman Gwendolen Fitzalan-Howard, Duchess of Norfolk, who was also the Suo jure 12th Lady Herries of Terregles. Lady Evelyn and the couple's eldest daughter Anne stayed at Norfolk House, London from January to April 1929.

=== Later life and death ===
Following the conclusion of the Second World War, Drummond and his wife rented the 12,500 acre Garynahine Estate near Stornoway on the Isle of Lewis duries the 1950s, and he served as a Deputy Lieutenant of Ross and Cromarty. They departed Garynahine in 1959 when the estate's owners decided to sell the property, and during the 1960s they lived at No. 2 Queen's Acre in Windsor, Berkshire.

Drummond died in September 1965 at Windsor. His funeral was held at The Royal Chapel, Windsor Great Park; attendees included his nephew David Drummond, 8th Earl of Perth, Bernard Fitzalan-Howard, 16th Duke of Norfolk, and Mary Somerset, Duchess of Beaufort.

Military offices
Preceded by Fischer Watson	Commander-in-Chief, New Zealand Division; 1935–1938	Succeeded by Irvine Glennie
