= James Rivett-Carnac (Royal Navy officer) =

Royal Navy Vice-Admiral (1891–1970)

Vice-Admiral James Rivett-Carnac CB CBE DSC DL
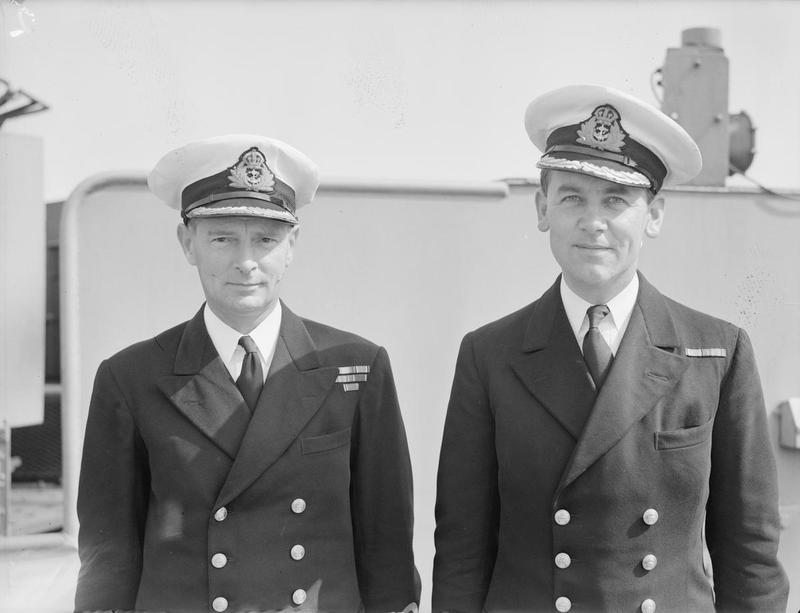
- Rivett-Carnac (left) on board HMS Rodney, April 1943
- Born: 12 February 1891
- Died: 9 October 1970 (aged 79)
- Military career
- Allegiance: United Kingdom
- Branch: Royal Navy
- Service years: 1910–1947
- Rank: Vice-Admiral
- Commands: HMS Rodney; Quartermaster (British Pacific Fleet); New Zealand Division
- Conflicts: First World War; Second World War
- Awards: Commander of the Order of the British Empire; Companion of the Order of the Bath; Distinguished Service Cross; Mentioned in despatches

Vice-Admiral James William Rivett-Carnac CB CBE DSC DL (12 February 1891 – 9 October 1970) was a Royal Navy officer who became commodore commanding the New Zealand Division.

== Naval career ==
Born the younger son of Rev. Sir Clennel George Rivett-Carnac, 6th Baronet, Rivett-Carnac joined the Royal Navy in 1910. and served in the First World War and was mentioned in despatches. Rivett-Carnac became commodore commanding the New Zealand Division in December 1938. He also served in the Second World War as Director of Training and Staff Duties at the Admiralty from April 1940 and as commanding officer of the battleship HMS Rodney from 1941 before becoming rear-admiral in charge of the Normandy beaches during the Operation Overlord, the Allied invasion of Europe, in 1944. In March 1945 he was appointed Rear-admiral Q, British Pacific Fleet until June 1945, then made acting vice-admiral with the new title of Vice-Admiral, Q British Pacific Fleet. He was responsible for organising logistical support of the BPF, including logistic activities ashore and for the ships of the Fleet Train until April 1946. He was mentioned in despatches twice during the war. He retired in 1947. In retirement he lived in Bury St Edmunds and became Deputy Lieutenant of Suffolk. He is buried in the churchyard of St. Martin's parish church in Fornham St. Martin in Suffolk.

== Family ==
He married Isla Nesta Blackwood.

Military offices
Preceded by Irvine Glennie	Commodore commanding the New Zealand Division; 1938–1939	Succeeded by Henry Horan
