= HMS Diomede (D92) =

Cruiser of the Royal Navy

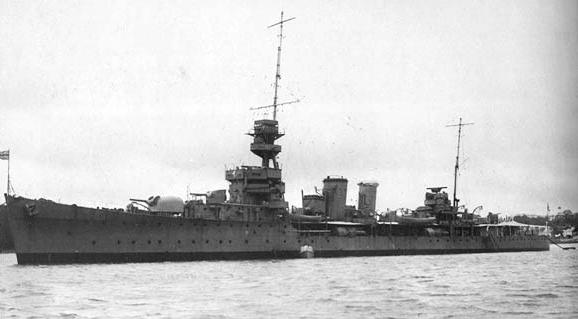
- HMS Diomede in 1938

History

United Kingdom
- Name: Diomede
- Ordered: March 1918
- Builder: Vickers, Barrow-in-Furness
- Laid down: 3 June 1918
- Launched: 29 April 1919
- Commissioned: October 1922
- Decommissioned: 5 April 1946
- In service: 1922
- Out of service: 1945
- Identification: Pennant number: 92 (Jun 22); I.92 (1936); D.92 (1940)
- Motto: Fortibus Feroces Frangitur
- Fate: Sold for scrap, 13 May 1946

General characteristics
- Class & type: Danae-class cruiser
- Displacement: 4,850 long tons (4,930 t)
- Length: 471 ft 2 in (143.61 m)
- Beam: 46 ft 3 in (14.10 m)
- Draught: 14 ft 3 in (4.34 m)
- Propulsion: 2 shafts; 2 geared steam turbines
- Speed: 29 knots (54 km/h; 33 mph)
- Range: 6,700 nmi (12,400 km; 7,700 mi) at 10 knots (19 km/h; 12 mph)
- Endurance: 24 days
- Capacity: 1,060 tons coal/oil
- Complement: 450
- Armament: 6 × single 6 in (152 mm) guns
- Armour: Deck: 1 in (25 mm); Belt: 3 in (76 mm); Conning tower: 6 in (152 mm)

HMS Diomede was a Danae-class cruiser of the Royal Navy. Constructed at Vickers Armstrong, Barrow, she was constructed too late to take part in World War I and was completed at the Royal Dockyard, Portsmouth. Between the wars, she served on the China Station, Pacific waters, East Indies Waters and from 1936 onwards, in reserve. In World War II she performed four years of arduous war duty, during which time she captured the crew of the German blockade runner Idarwald after she had chased that ship and when the crew scuttled Idarwald. Between 22 July 1942 and 24 September 1943 she was converted to a training ship at Rosyth Dockyard. In 1945 she was placed in reserve and scrapped a year later.

== Background ==
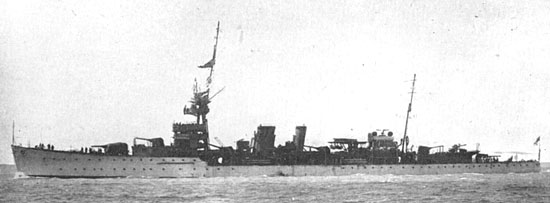
HMS Diomede as completed in 1922

During World War I intelligence reports suggested that the Germans were building a new class of cruiser which could outgun the existing C-class light cruisers. It was believed that an improved C class with an added super-firing 6-inch (152 mm) gun in front of the deckhouse (and the requisite increase of beam and adapting of superstructure) would maintain British naval superiority in a battle. In September 1916 the first three ships of the new class (Danae, Dauntless and Dragon) were launched and a second group (Delhi, Dunedin and Durban) was ordered in July 1917.

Diomede, was part of a third tranche ordered in March 1918. This group was to have comprised six vessels, but the end of the war saw this reduced to two, Diomede and Despatch. Diomede had been laid down Vickers Armstrong of Barrow-in-Furness in mid-1918, but after launching in 1919 work was suspended. However, in 1922 she was towed to the Royal Dockyard, Portsmouth and completed on 22 February. Like the second group of Danae-class vessels, Diomede was fitted with a trawler bow. Diomede was unique in her class in having an experimental fully enclosed 6-inch mounting in the "A" position. Before completion, the suitability of her conversion to a royal yacht had been discussed, but nothing came of the idea.

== Early career ==
Upon commissioning Diomede joined the 5th Light Cruiser Squadron on the China Station in 1922. In 1925 she was transferred to the New Zealand Division of the Royal Navy at Devonport where she served until 1935, apart from a refit in 1929–1930. In 1931 she rendered assistance to the town of Napier, New Zealand after the devastating Hawkes Bay earthquake, supplying medical personnel, equipment, guards and firemen, along with her sister ship Dunedin. Afterwards Diomede escorted the beach-damaged sloop Veronica to Auckland. The Executive officer at the time (1930–1933) was Commander, later Admiral Victor Crutchley, who was to later become entwined with the Pacific Campaign of World War II.

Upon the notification that the two cruisers of the New Zealand Division were to be replaced by Leander-class cruisers, in 1935 Diomede started her voyage home to Britain to be paid off into the reserve. En route the Abyssinian Crisis broke out and she was diverted to the 4th Light Cruiser Squadron, part of the East Indies Station based at Aden for possible action against the Italians. Upon relief by the cruiser Achilles on 31 March 1936 she was paid off and spent the next three years in the reserve fleet or as a troop ship.

== World War II ==
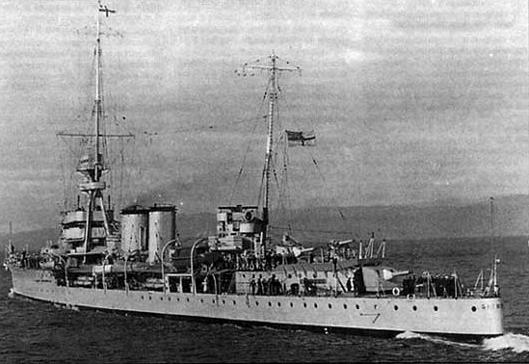
HMS Diomede in 1924 as in 1939

With the growing likelihood of war, Diomede was reactivated. 3 September 1939 found her with the 7th Cruiser Squadron serving as part of the Home Fleet on Northern Patrol duties. Before the despatch of the 7th Cruiser Squadron to the Mediterranean in 1940 in light of the Italian threat, Diomede was attached to the 8th Cruiser Squadron on the America and West Indies Station on shipping protection and patrolling duty. The home base of the squadron was the Royal Naval Dockyard in the Imperial fortress colony of Bermuda, where the French submarine Surcouf tied up alongside her not long before disappearing under mysterious circumstances. On 8 December 1940 she chased the German blockade runner Idarwald from Tampico, Mexico. Before a capture could be effected the crew of the German freighter set it afire and scuttled it off Cabo Corrientes, Cuba. The crew were rescued and captured. The US destroyer USS Sturtevant observed the proceedings.

In early 1942 Diomede joined the 9th Cruiser Squadron as part of the South Atlantic and West African Squadron. After more than a decade of steaming it was decided to retire her from front-line service and from 22 July 1942 to 24 September 1943 she converted into a training ship at Rosyth Dockyard. With the end of the war she was reduced to reserve. On 5 April 1946 she was sold for scrap to Arnott Young of Dalmuir and arrived there for breaking up on 5 May.

== Bibliography ==
- Campbell, N.J.M. (1980). "Great Britain". In Chesneau, Roger (ed.). Conway's All the World's Fighting Ships 1922–1946. New York: Mayflower Books. pp. 2–85. ISBN 0-8317-0303-2.
- Colledge, J. J.; Warlow, Ben & Bush, Steve (2020). Ships of the Royal Navy: The Complete Record of all Fighting Ships of the Royal Navy from the 15th Century to the Present (5th revised and updated ed.). Seaforth Publishing. ISBN 978-1-5267-9327-0.
- Dodson, Aidan (2026). "The Cadet Training Ships of the Royal Navy". In Jordan, John (ed.). Warship 2026. Osprey Publishing. pp. 156–174. ISBN 978-1-4728-7259-3.
- Friedman, Norman (2010). British Cruisers: Two World Wars and After. Barnsley, UK: Seaforth Publishing. ISBN 978-1-59114-078-8.
- Raven, Alan & Roberts, John (1980). British Cruisers of World War Two. Annapolis, Maryland: Naval Institute Press. ISBN 0-87021-922-7.
- Rohwer, Jürgen (2005). Chronology of the War at Sea 1939–1945: The Naval History of World War Two (Third Revised ed.). Annapolis, Maryland: Naval Institute Press. ISBN 1-59114-119-2.
- Whitley, M. J. (1995). Cruisers of World War Two: An International Encyclopedia. London: Cassell. ISBN 1-86019-874-0.
