= HMS Veronica (1915) =

Minesweeper of the Royal Navy

History

United Kingdom
- Name: HMS Veronica
- Builder: Dunlop Bremner & Company, Port Glasgow
- Laid down: January 1915
- Launched: 27 May 1915
- Completed: August 1915
- Identification: Pennant number: T87 in January 1918, later T67
- Fate: Sold for scrapping 22 February 1935

General characteristics
- Class & type: Acacia-class sloop
- Displacement: 1,200 long tons (1,219 t)
- Length: 250 ft (76 m) p/p; 262 ft 6 in (80.01 m) o/a
- Beam: 33 ft (10 m)
- Draught: 12 ft (3.7 m)
- Propulsion: 1 × 4-cylinder triple expansion engine; 2 × cylindrical boilers; 1 screw
- Range: 2,000 nmi (3,700 km) at 15 knots (28 km/h; 17 mph) with max. 250 tons of coal
- Complement: 77
- Armament: 2 × 12-pdr (76 mm) guns; 2 × 3-pdr (47 mm) AA guns

HMS Veronica was an Acacia-class sloop of the Royal Navy. She served during World War I. Post-war, she saw New Zealand service.

== Construction ==
Veronica was built by Dunlop Bremner & Company, Port Glasgow, Scotland. She was laid down in January 1915, launched on 27 May 1915, and completed in August 1915. The Acacia-class fleet sweeping sloops were adapted for escort work, minesweeping, and use as Q-ships.

== Operational history ==
=== World War I ===
During her World War I service, Veronica was damaged in the Mediterranean Sea 45 nautical miles (83 km) northwest of Alexandria, Egypt (31°43′N 29°17′E), by the Imperial German Navy submarine SM UB-42 on 14 April 1917. Veronica was repaired and returned to service.

=== New Zealand service ===
Veronica was in the New Zealand Division of the Royal Navy from 19 September 1920 to 24 February 1934, where she exercised with cruisers, toured New Zealand ports, took part in ceremonial occasions, and went on annual Pacific Island cruises. This was in conjunction with her sister ship Laburnum which was similar, but with small differences as they came from different commercial shipyards.

=== Hawke's Bay earthquake ===
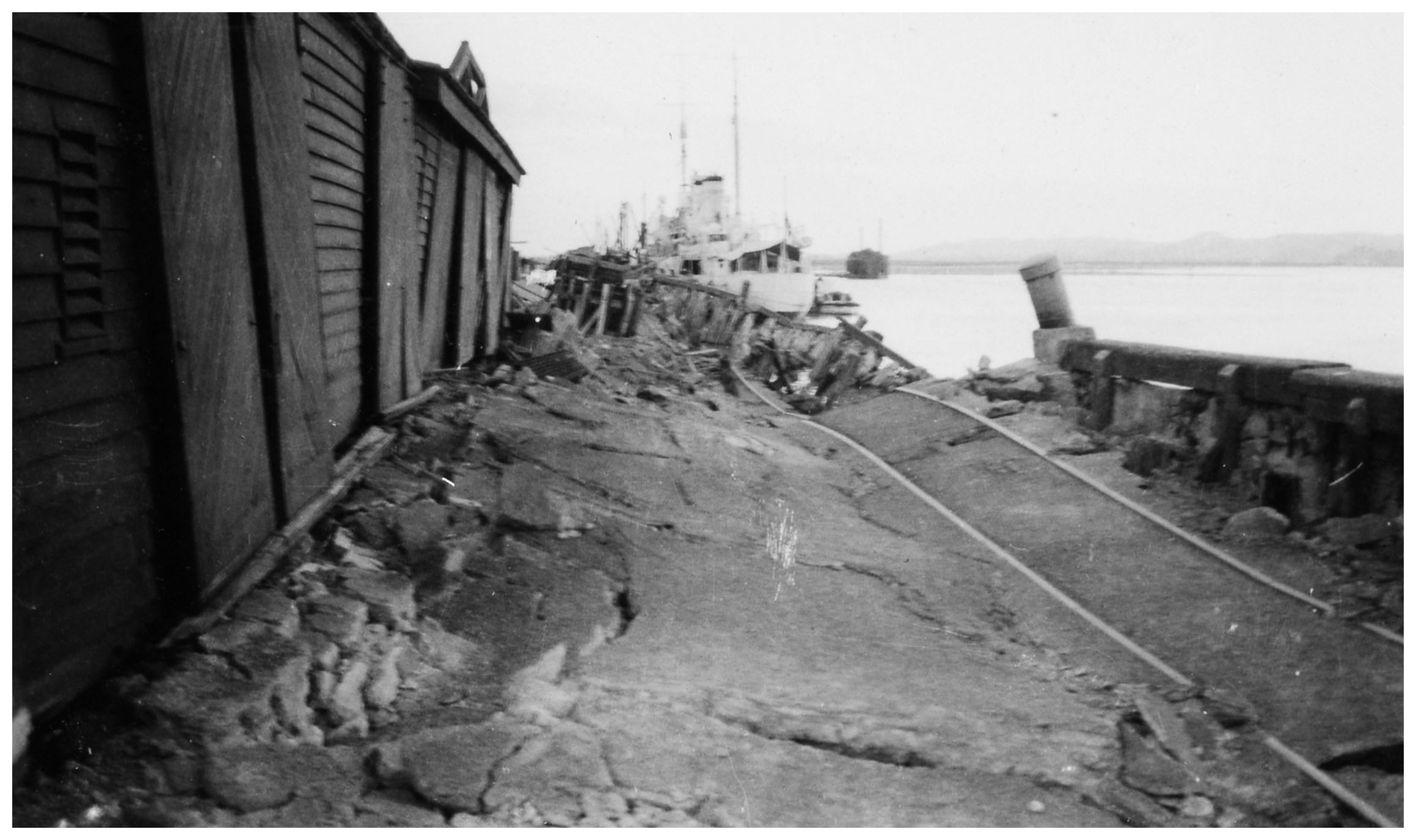
Veronica at the Wharf, 1931. Hawkes Bay Earthquake, Port Ahuriri

Veronica assisted survivors in the aftermath of the 1931 Hawke's Bay earthquake in New Zealand. Having berthed in Port Ahuriri only three hours before the earthquake, she radioed Auckland for help, which was provided by the light cruisers Dunedin and Diomede. She was subsequently docked for inspection for possible bottom damage as the seabed had risen up under her.

== Fate ==
Veronica left Auckland, New Zealand, on 24 February 1934 for paying off at Chatham, England. She was sold on 22 February 1935 to John Cashmore Ltd, and broken up at Newport, Wales, in 1935.

== Commemoration ==
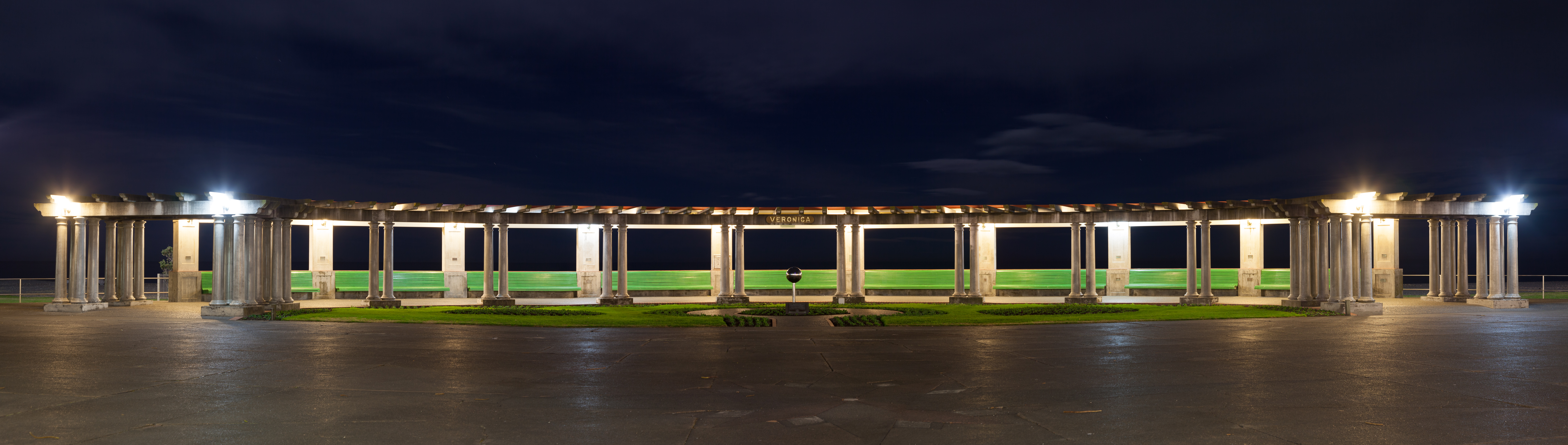
The Veronica Sunbay in Napier

A memorial to HMS Veronica, the Veronica Sunbay (initially called the Veronica Sun Bay), was built in 1934 and dedicated in 1937 on Napier's Marine Parade, commemorating her efforts after the city's 1931 earthquake. The beginning of the inscription reads:

The Veronica Sun Bay Originally erected in 1934 to commemorate the Hawke's Bay earthquake of 3rd February 1931. This memorial is named in honour of HMS Veronica and the outstanding service given by her officers and crew at the time of the disaster. Rebuilding of the Sun Bay was accomplished through the initiative and leadership of the Rotary Club of Napier and contributions from the citizens of Hawke's Bay and the Napier City Council. This plaque was unveiled at the dedication of the rebuilt memorial. It took place on the Sixtieth Anniversary of the earthquake – 3rd February 1991.

The bell of HMS Veronica is held at Hawke's Bay Museum, and rung at the New Year.
