= HMS Laburnum =

Minesweeper of the Royal Navy

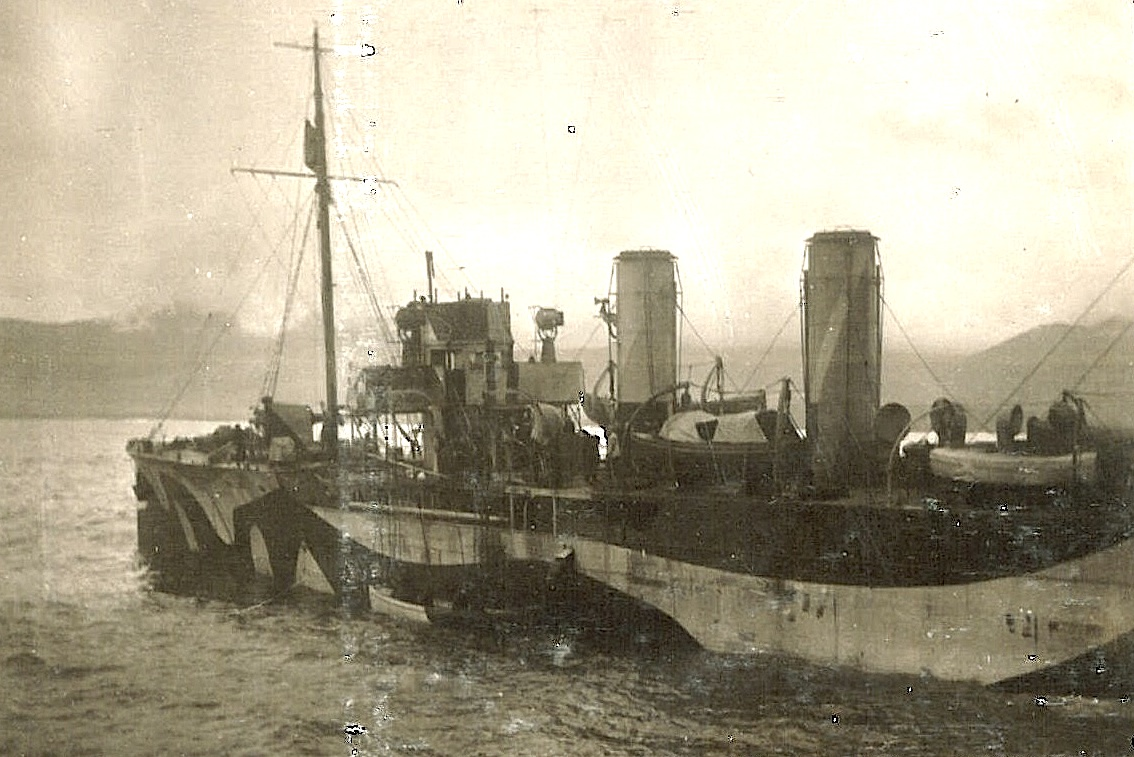
- HMS Laburnum in a photo taken in 1917 by Eric Murray from HMS Poppy

History

United Kingdom
- Name: HMS Laburnum
- Namesake: Laburnum
- Builder: Charles Connell and Company, Scotstoun
- Laid down: February 1915
- Launched: 10 June 1915
- Completed: August 1915
- Identification: Pennant number: T49 (January 1918), later T48
- Fate: Transferred to New Zealand Division of the Royal Navy, 11 March 1922

New Zealand
- Name: HMS Laburnum
- Acquired: 11 March 1922
- Fate: Transferred to Straits Settlement Naval Volunteer Reserve, 11 February 1935

Straits Settlements
- Name: HMS Laburnum
- Acquired: 11 February 1935
- Fate: Scuttled, 15 February 1942

General characteristics
- Class & type: Acacia-class sloop
- Displacement: 1,200 long tons (1,219 t)
- Length: 250 ft (76 m) p/p; 262 ft 6 in (80.01 m) o/a
- Beam: 33 ft (10 m)
- Draught: 12 ft (3.7 m)
- Propulsion: 1 × 4-cylinder triple expansion engine; 2 × cylindrical boilers; 1 screw
- Range: 2,000 nmi (3,700 km) at 15 kn (28 km/h) with max. 250 tons of coal
- Complement: 77
- Armament: 2 × 12-pdr (76 mm) guns; 2 × 3-pdr (47 mm) AA guns

HMS Laburnum was a Royal Navy Acacia-class sloop built by Charles Connell and Company, Scotstoun. She was scuttled during the fall of Singapore in 1942.

== Construction ==
She was laid down at the Scotstoun yard of Charles Connell and Company in February 1915, launched on 10 June 1915 and completed in August 1915. The Acacia-class fleet sweeping sloops were adapted for escort work, minesweeping and as decoy warships.

== Service history ==
=== First World War ===
Laburnum joined the First Sloop Flotilla on commissioning. On 4 September 1915, the passenger liner Hesperian was torpedoed without warning by the German submarine U-20 southwest of Queenstown (now called Cobh) in the south of Ireland with the loss of 32 lives. Laburnum was one of several ships, also including the seaplane carrier Empress and the sloops Marigold and Veronica, to go to Hesperian's aid. Attempts to tow Hesperian to port failed, with the stricken liner sinking on 6 September. The sinking of the Hesperian, which occurred despite an assurance to US President Woodrow Wilson from the German Chancellor Theobald von Bethmann Hollweg that no passenger liners would be sunk without warning, provoked protests from America that resulted in the submarine campaign against merchant shipping in British waters being suspended for several months.

On 24 April 1916, the Easter Rising, an armed rebellion by Irish republicans against British rule, began. Laburnum was ordered to Galway to defend the port on 25 April, arriving there on 26 April. On hearing reports that a group of rebels were advancing on the port, the Captain of Laburnum ordered her to open fire, with 10 shells being fired in the direction of the rebels and at a road on the outskirts of the city. On 28 April, Laburnum escorted a transport carrying troops to Galway.

On 8 February 1917, the German submarine U-81 torpedoed the passenger steamship Mantola 143 miles (230 km) WSW of Fastnet Rock, causing Mantola's crew to abandon ship. U-81 remained in the vicinity until chased away by Laburnum when she arrived on the scene 2 1/2 hours later. Laburnum rescued 176 survivors of Mantola's passengers and crew (seven crewmen had been killed by a capsizing lifeboat) and tried to tow the steamship by the stern, but was unable to make headway. Mantola sank on 9 February. On 17 February 1917, the Q-ship Farnborough was torpedoed by the German submarine U-83, but after a "panic party" faked abandoning ship, U-83 surfaced near Farnborough and was sunk by shellfire from the Q-ship. Farnborough herself was badly damaged by the torpedo, and was taken into tow by Laburnum and the sloop Buttercup after the destroyer Narwhal had taken off most of Farnborough's crew. Farnborough was beached at Mill Cove. On 25 February 1917 Laburnum was patrolling to the west of the Blasket Islands, off the west coast of Ireland, when she was ordered to meet up with and escort the liner Laconia which was Liverpool-bound from the United States. Uncertainty about Laconia's location delayed the rendezvous between the ships, with the result that Laconia was torpedoed by the German submarine U-50 before Laburnum could arrive on the scene. While Laburnum could not prevent Laconia sinking, she did manage to rescue 292 passengers and crew. Twelve passengers and crew were killed.

=== Far East service ===
She was in the New Zealand Division of the Royal Navy from 11 March 1922 to 11 February 1935, where she exercised with cruisers, toured New Zealand ports, took part in ceremonial occasions, and went on annual Pacific Island cruises. This was in conjunction with her sister ship Veronica which was similar, but with small differences as they came from different commercial shipyards.

She left Auckland on 1 February 1935 for Singapore, where she was paid off to become a drill and training ship for the Straits Settlement Naval Volunteer Reserve.

=== Drill ship at Singapore ===
As drill ship, Laburnum was equipped with independent wireless equipment, and housed a number of naval offices including Captain, Auxiliary Vessels and Captain, Extended Defences Office. Laburnum had her engines removed shortly after her arrival in Singapore in order to augment her accommodation. Hence she could not be fully utilised when war broke out in the Far East. With the evacuation of Penang, Laburnum also played host to the RNVR Penang Division, headed by Commander C C Alexander.

== Fate ==
Labernum was scuttled on 15 February 1942 when Singapore fell to Japanese forces. Her wreck was raised about 1946, and sunk off East Lagoon, Singapore, as part of an existing breakwater of old hulks, and finally removed and scrapped about 1967.
