= Alister Beal =

New Zealand Royal Navy officer

Vice-Admiral Alister Beal CB CMG DSO
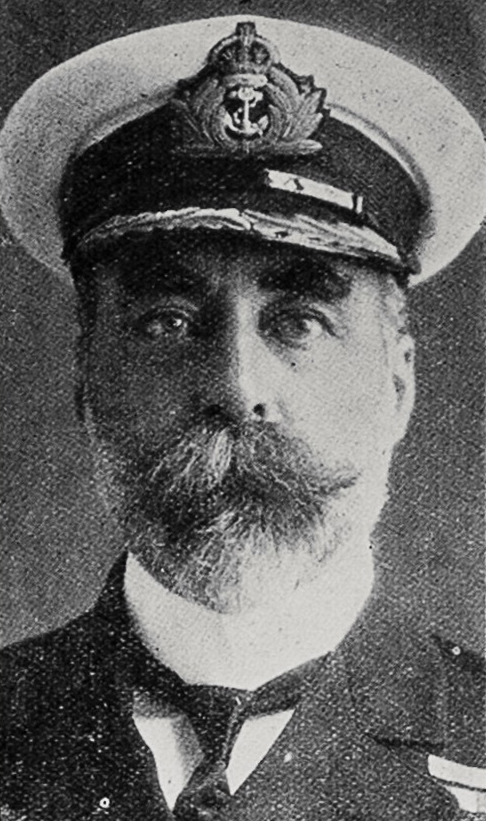
- Born: 21 March 1875; Glamis, Forfarshire, Scotland
- Died: 18 October 1962 (aged 87); Bromley, Kent, England
- Military career
- Allegiance: United Kingdom
- Branch: Royal Navy
- Service years: 1888–1926
- Rank: Vice-Admiral
- Commands: HMS Weymouth; HMS Chatham; New Zealand Division
- Conflicts: World War I Battle of Durazzo (1918)
- Awards: Commander of the Order of the British Empire; Companion of the Order of St Michael and St George; Distinguished Service Order; Silver Medal of Military Valor (Italy); Officer of the Legion of Honour (France)

Vice-Admiral Alister Francis Beal CB CMG DSO (21 March 1875 – 18 October 1962) was a Royal Navy officer who became Commodore Commanding the New Zealand Division.

== Naval career ==
Beal joined the Royal Navy as a 13-year-old on 15 July 1888. He was commissioned as a midshipman in 1894 and served in World War I becoming commanding officer of the cruiser HMS Weymouth in February 1918 and being awarded the DSO for his services at the bombardment of Durazzo in October 1918.

He went on to Command HMS Chatham (which had been lent to the New Zealand Station) in July 1923 before becoming Commodore Commanding the New Zealand Division in August 1923 until he retired in 1926. He was appointed a Companion of the Order of the Bath in the 1926 King's Birthday Honours and promoted to Vice-Admiral while on the retired list.

Beal was appointed as an Officer of the French Legion of Honour while serving on HMS Weymouth. He was awarded the Italian Silver Medal of Military Valor for operations at Durazzo on 2 October 1918.

== Family ==
He was married to Mabel Constance Annie Youl.

Military offices
Preceded by Alan Hotham	Commander-in-Chief, New Zealand Division; 1923–1926	Succeeded by George Swabey
