= George Swabey =

Vice-Admiral Sir George Swabey KBE CB DSO
- Born: 22 January 1881; Aspley Guise, Bedfordshire
- Died: 9 February 1952 (aged 71); Chichester, Sussex
- Military career
- Allegiance: United Kingdom
- Branch: Royal Navy
- Service years: 1895–1929; 1939–1945
- Rank: Vice-Admiral
- Commands: New Zealand Division
- Conflicts: World War I World War II
- Awards: Knight Commander of the Order of the British Empire; Companion of the Order of the Bath; Distinguished Service Order

Vice-Admiral Sir George Thomas Carlisle Parker Swabey KBE CB DSO (22 January 1881 – 9 February 1952) was a Royal Navy officer who became Commander-in-Chief of the New Zealand Division.

== Naval career ==
Educated at the Royal Naval College, Dartmouth, Swabey joined the Royal Navy in 1895, and was confirmed as Sub-lieutenant 19 July 1900. He saw early service at the pre-dreadnought battleship HMS Prince George in the Channel Fleet, and was promoted to lieutenant in July 1902.

He served in World War I as a Naval Observation Officer on the battleship HMS Lord Nelson, earning the DSO during operations at Gallipoli, before becoming Executive Officer of that ship. He was appointed deputy director of Naval Ordnance in 1921, captain of the Royal Naval College, Greenwich, in 1924 and commodore commanding the New Zealand Division in 1926 before retiring in 1929. He was promoted to Vice-Admiral while on the retired list in January 1935.

Swabey was recalled in September 1939 at the start of World War II and served as a Commodore of Convoys from 1940, Vice-Admiral in Charge at Portland from 1942 (in which capacity he was involved in planning and implementing the Normandy landings for US forces) and Naval Officer in Charge at Leith from 1944 before retiring again in 1945.

== Family ==
In 1920 he married Lois Ridley.

Military offices
Preceded by Alister Beal	Commander-in-Chief, New Zealand Division; 1926–1929	Succeeded by Geoffrey Blake
