= HMS Dunedin =

Cruiser of the Royal Navy

Coordinates: 03°00′S 26°00′W

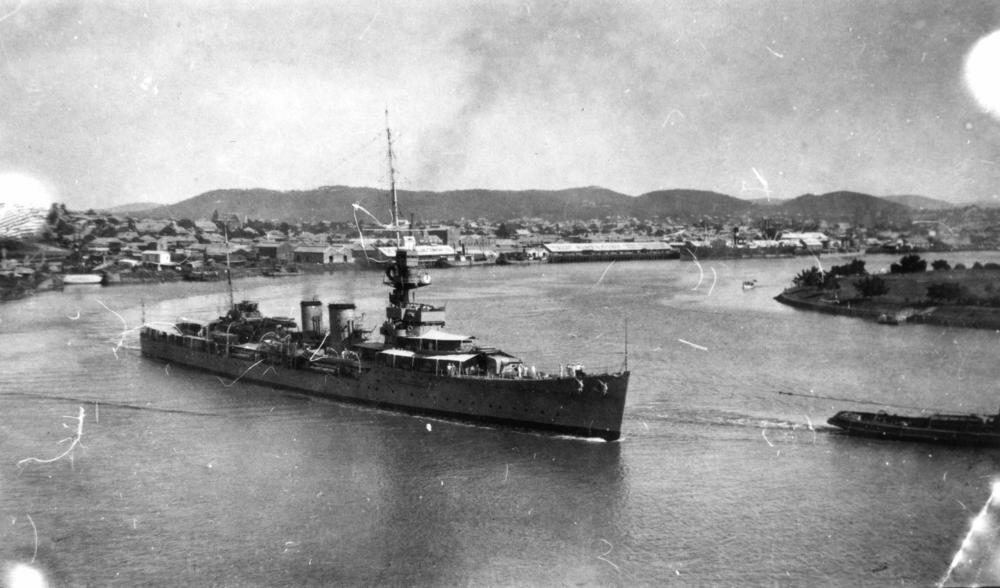
- Dunedin turning into Gardens Reach on the Brisbane River. South Brisbane wharves in background.

History

United Kingdom
- Name: HMS Dunedin
- Builder: Armstrong Whitworth Newcastle-on-Tyne: Hawthorn Leslie and Company, Hebburn
- Laid down: 5 November 1917
- Launched: 19 November 1918
- Commissioned: 13 September 1919
- Identification: Pennant number: 96 (Aug 19); 93 (Nov 19); I.93 (1936); D.93 (1940)
- Fate: Sunk, 24 November 1941

General characteristics
- Class & type: Danae-class light cruiser
- Displacement: 4,276 tons; Full: 5,603 tons; After 1924: 4,850
- Length: 445 ft (136 m)
- Beam: 46 ft 6 in (14.17 m)
- Draught: 14 ft 6 in (4.42 m)
- Propulsion: Six Yarrow-type water-tube boilers; Parsons geared steam turbines; Two shafts; 40,000 shp (30 MW)
- Speed: 29 knots (54 km/h)
- Range: 2,300 nmi (4,300 km)
- Complement: 462
- Armament: 1918: 6 x BL 6-inch (152 mm) L/45 Mark XII on single mountings CP Mark XIV (152 mm); 2 × 3-inch (76 mm) Mk II AA guns; 2 × 40 mm QF 2-pounder "pom-pom" AA guns; 12 × 21 inch (533 mm) torpedoes (4 triple launchers)
- Armour: 3 inch side (amidships); 2, 1¾, 1½ side (bow and stern); 1 inch upper decks (amidships); 1 inch deck over rudder

HMS Dunedin was a Danae-class light cruiser of the Royal Navy, pennant number D93. She was launched from the yards of Armstrong Whitworth, Newcastle-on-Tyne on 19 November 1918 and commissioned on 13 September 1919. She has been the only ship of the Royal Navy to bear the name Dunedin (named after the capital of Scotland, generally Anglicised as Edinburgh).

== Service history ==
In October 1920 she, with the other three British vessels, was sent to assure protection of the unloading of munitions intended for Poland, at Danzig.

In 1931 she provided assistance to the town of Napier, New Zealand, after the strong Hawkes Bay earthquake, in a task force with the sloop Veronica and the cruiser Diomede.

=== Second World War ===
Early in the Second World War, Dunedin was involved in the hunt for the German battleships Scharnhorst and Gneisenau after the sinking of the armed merchant cruiser Rawalpindi.

In early 1940 Dunedin was operating in the Caribbean Sea, and there she intercepted the German merchant ship Heidelberg west of the Windward Passage. Heidelberg's crew scuttled the ship before Dunedin could take her. A few days later, Dunedin, in company with the Canadian destroyer Assiniboine, intercepted and captured the German merchant ship Hannover near Jamaica. Hannover later became the first British escort carrier, Audacity. Between July and November, Dunedin, together with the cruiser Trinidad, maintained a blockade off Martinique, in part to bottle up three French warships, including the aircraft carrier Béarn.

On 15 June 1941, Dunedin captured the German tanker Lothringen and gathered some highly classified Enigma cipher machines that she carried. The Royal Navy reused Lothringen as the fleet oiler Empire Salvage. Dunedin went on to capture three Vichy French vessels, Ville de Rouen off Natal, the merchant ship Ville de Tamatave east of the Saint Paul's Rocks, and finally, D'Entrecasteaux.

Dunedin was part of the escort of Convoy WS 5A when it was attacked by the German heavy cruiser Admiral Hipper on 25 December 1940. The attack was repulsed by other ships of the escort, without losses to the convoy.

Dunedin was still steaming in the Central Atlantic Ocean, just east of the St. Paul's Rocks, north east of Recife, Brazil, when on 24 November 1941, at 1526 hours, two torpedoes from the German submarine U-124 sank her. Only four officers and 63 men survived out of Dunedin's crew of 486 officers and men.
