= HMS Tempest =

HMS Tempest was the name of two Royal Navy warships:

- HMS Tempest (H71) was an R-class destroyer. She was launched in January 1917 and scrapped in January 1937.
- HMS Tempest (N86) was a T-class submarine. She launched in June 1941 and was sunk by an Italian torpedo boat in February 1942.
