= Charles Speight (businessman) =

New Zealand brewer and businessman

Charles Speight CBE
- Born: 30 July 1865; Dunedin, New Zealand
- Died: 19 February 1928 (aged 62); Dunedin, New Zealand
- Occupations: Brewer, businessman
- Organizations: New Zealand Breweries; Waipori Falls Electric Power Company; Peninsula Ferry Company; Dunedin–Wanganui Shipping Company
- Known for: Speight's Brewery
- Spouse: Jessie McCulloch Brown
- Children: 5
- Parent(s): James Speight; Mary Jane Jenkinson
- Relatives: Norman Speight (son)
- Awards: Commander of the Order of the British Empire (1926)

Charles Speight CBE (30 July 1865 – 19 February 1928) was a New Zealand brewer and businessman.

Speight was born in Dunedin, New Zealand, in 1865. In the 1926 King's Birthday Honours Speight was appointed a Commander of the Order of the British Empire in recognition of his role as vice-chairman of the New Zealand and South Seas International Exhibition.

== See also ==
- Speight's
