= Danae-class cruiser =

Class of Royal Navy light cruisers

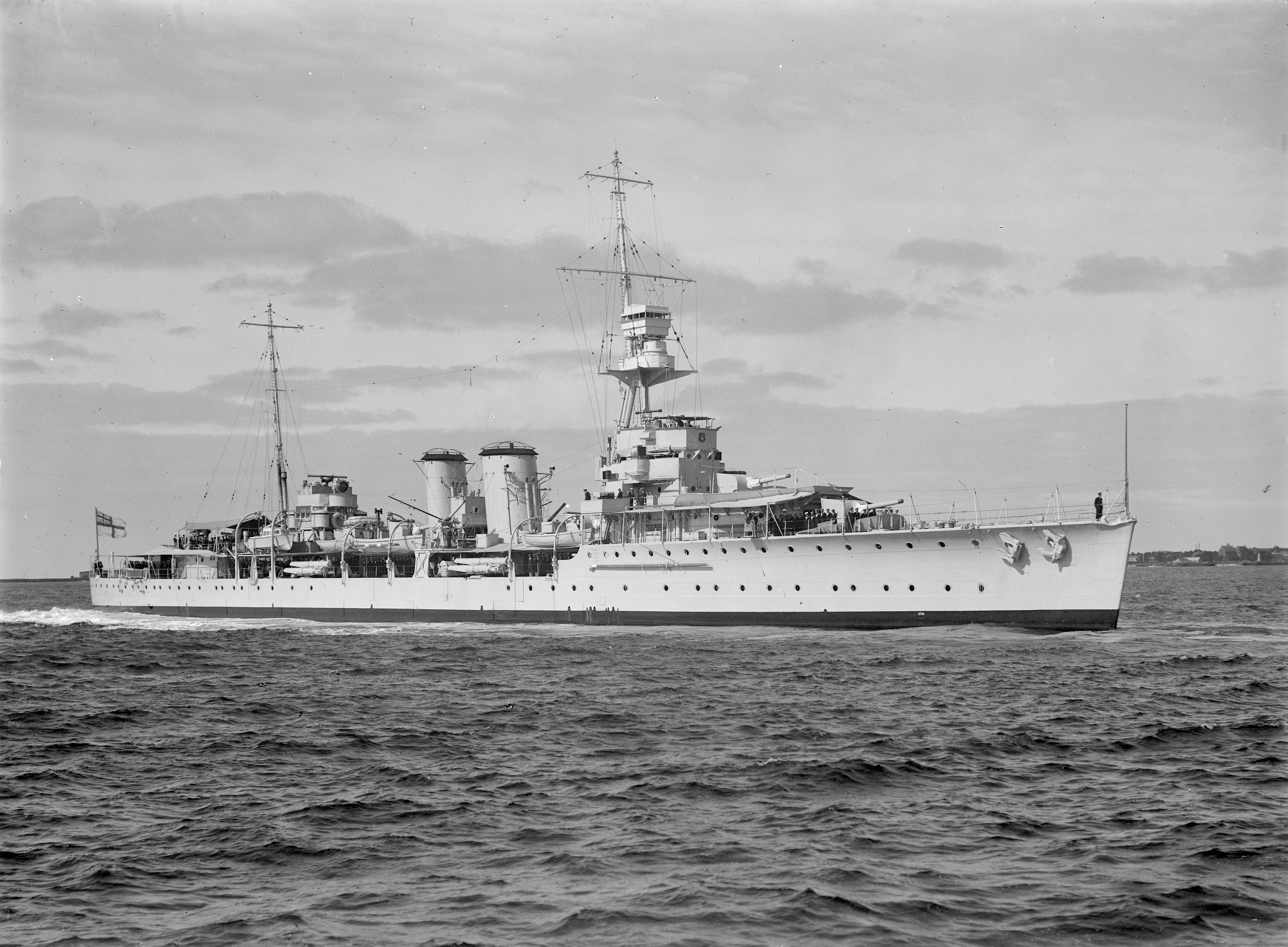
- Danae

Class overview
- Name: Danae class
- Builders: Armstrong Whitworth (3); Fairfield Shipbuilding (1); Palmers Shipbuilding (1); Scotts Shipbuilding (2); Vickers Limited (1)
- Operators: Royal Navy; Polish Navy
- Preceded by: C class
- Succeeded by: Emerald class
- In commission: 1918–1946
- Planned: 12
- Completed: 8
- Cancelled: 4
- Lost: 3

General characteristics
- Type: Light cruiser
- Displacement: 4,850 tons standard; 5,925 tons full
- Length: 445 ft (135.6 m) (p/p); 472.5 ft (144.0 m) (o/a)
- Beam: 46.5 ft (14.2 m) (47 ft (14 m) in Despatch and Diomede)
- Draught: 14.5 ft (4.4 m) (16.5 ft (5.0 m) full)
- Propulsion: Six Yarrow-type water-tube boilers; Parsons (Brown-Curtis in Dauntless, Diomede) geared steam turbines; Two shafts; 40,000 shp (30,000 kW)
- Speed: 29 knots (54 km/h; 33 mph) (27 knots full)
- Range: 2,300 nmi (4,260 km) at 27 knots (50.0 km/h)
- Complement: 450 / 469 war
- Armament: 6 × BL 6-inch (152.4 mm) L/45 Mark XII guns on single mountings CP Mark XIV (Diomede 1 × mount CP Mk.XVI); 2 × QF 3 inch 20 cwt L/45 Mk.I on mounts HA Mk.II; 2 × QF 2-pounder L/39 Mk.II on mounts HA Mk.II; 4 × triple tubes for 21-inch (533 mm) torpedoes
- Armour: Main belt: 1.5–2.25 in (38–57 mm) forward; 3 in (76 mm) amidships; 2.25–2 in (57–51 mm) aft; Upper deck:1 in (25 mm) over machinery; Main deck: 1 in over steering gear; Gunshields: 1 in

The Danae or D class consisted of eight light cruisers built for the Royal Navy at the end of World War I which also saw service in World War II.

== Design ==
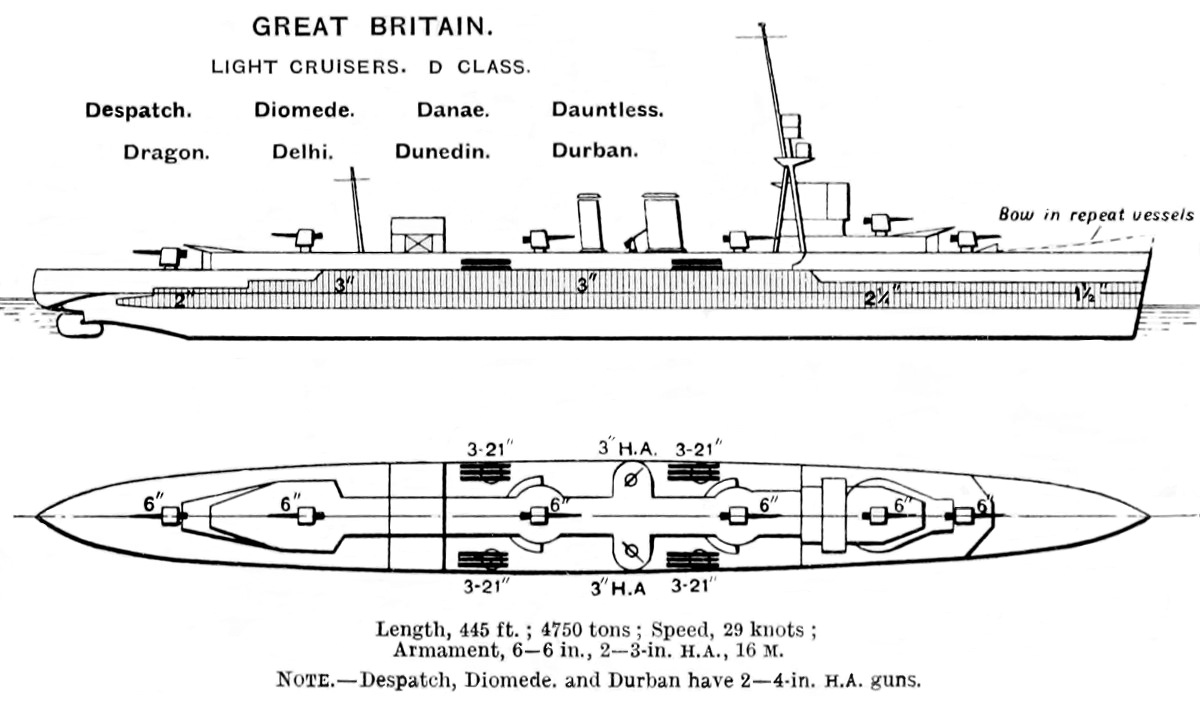
Right elevation and deck plan as depicted in Brassey's Naval Annual 1923

The Danaes were based on the design of the preceding C class series, but were lengthened by 20 feet (6 m) to allow a sixth 6-inch (152 mm) gun to be worked in between the bridge and the fore funnel. This gave an 'A', 'B', 'P', 'Q', 'X', 'Y' arrangement. Additionally, the twin torpedo tubes in the C class were replaced by triples, giving the Danaes a total of twelve tubes, the heaviest torpedo armament for a cruiser at the time. Machinery and general layout was otherwise the same as the Ceres group of C-class cruisers. However, Danae, Dauntless and Dragon were ordered before the Capetown group, and therefore did not incorporate the improved bow design of the latter; the C class were very wet forwards, and in the Capetowns sheer was increased forwards into a knuckled "trawler bow". Such was the success of the knuckled bow that it was incorporated into all subsequent British cruisers (except Birmingham of 1935 which was completed without). Despatch and Diomede had their beam increased by ½ foot to increase stability and Dragon and Dauntless were completed with a hangar for a floatplane built into the bridge, the compass platform being on top. Delhi, Dunedin, Durban, Despatch and Diomede were provided with flying-off platforms for a wheeled aircraft aft. Despatch and Diomede were completed with 4 inch anti-aircraft (A/A) guns vis 12 pounder (3 inch) guns in their sisters and Diomede had 'A' gun shipped in a weatherproof housing CP Mark XVI, an encouraging development for gun crews hitherto exposed to the worst of the elements on the fo'c'sle.

== Modifications ==
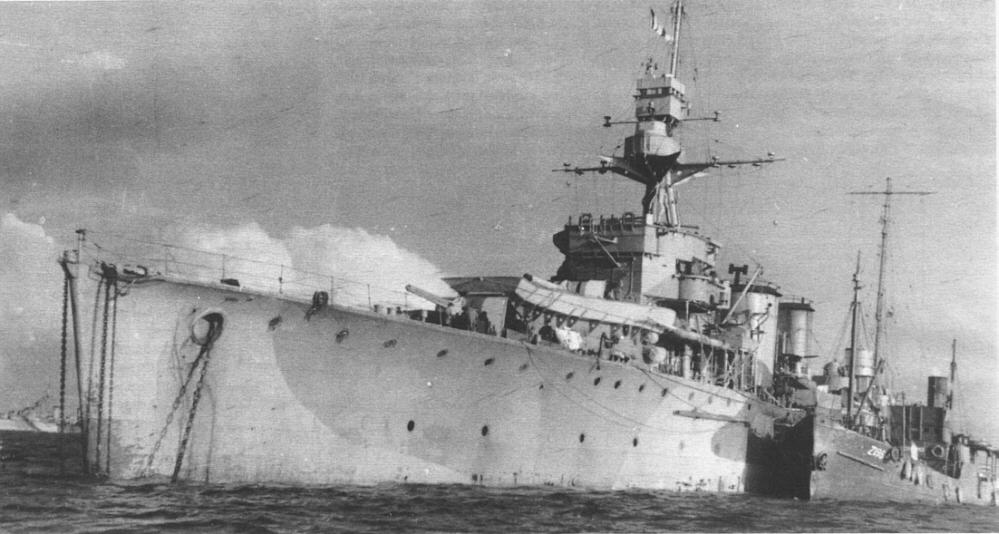
ORP Dragon, previously HMS Dragon

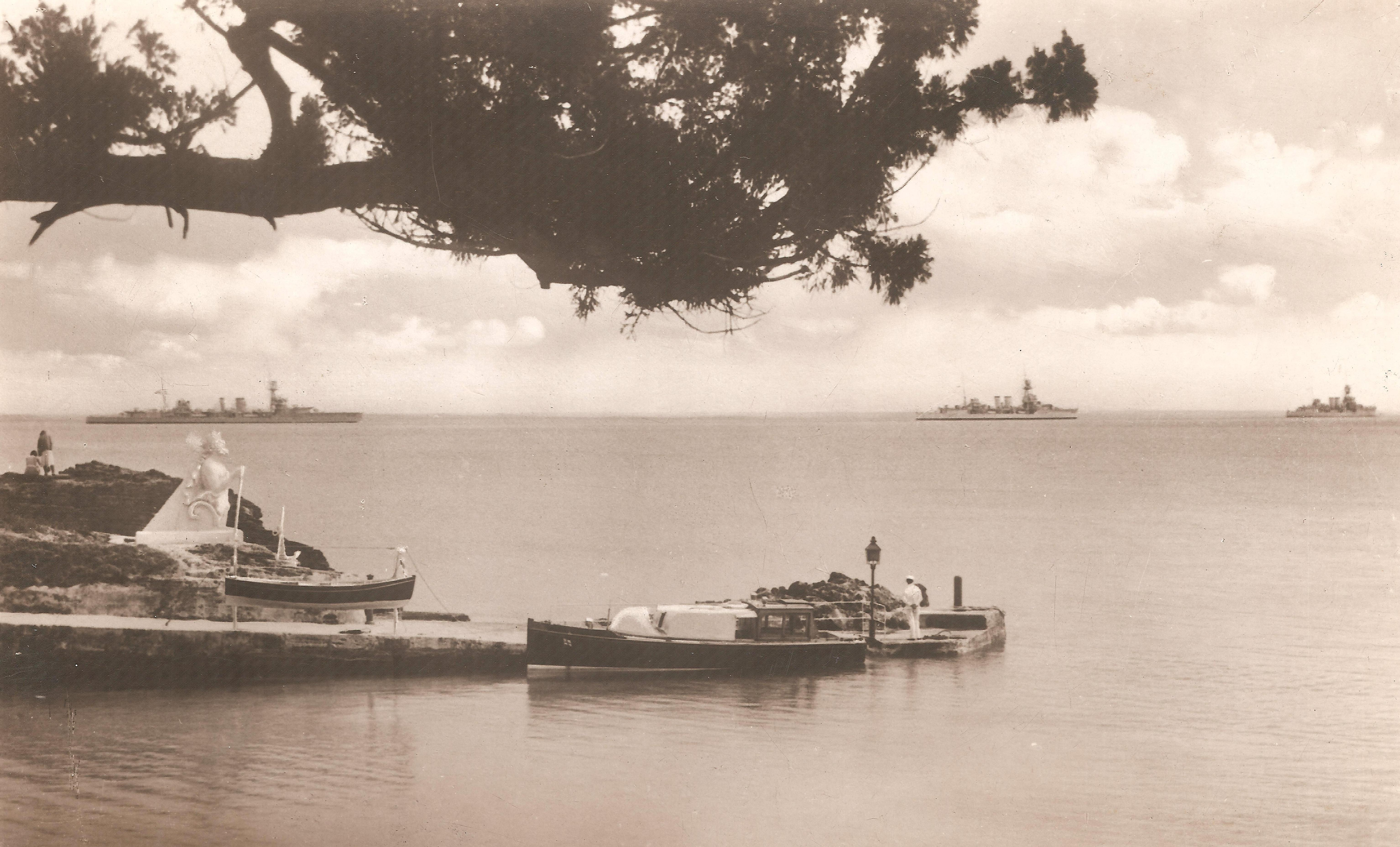
America and West Indies Station 1st Division (HMS Dragon, HMS Danae and HMS Despatch) off Admiralty House in 1931 as they depart their base at the Royal Naval Dockyard in the Imperial fortress of Bermuda to exercise on the open North Atlantic

The lessons of the Battle of Jutland were applied and protection was improved in detail. Additional torpedo tubes were installed and depth charge throwers were also included. The Mk XII 6-inch (152 mm) gun was retained but, in Diomede, a new prototype gun house (allowing greater elevation) was used and found to be most satisfactory.

Inter-war, all ships had their anti-aircraft armament standardised as three QF 4 inch Mark V guns on mountings HA Mark III, with a QF 2 pdr Mk.II gun in each bridge wing. All aircraft equipment were removed and Dragon and Dauntless had their bridges rebuilt along the lines of the rest of the class.

Early modifications in World War II included the addition of Radar Type 286 air warning at the foremast head and, later, Type 273 centimetric target indication set on the searchlight platform amidships. Between 6 and 8 20 mm Oerlikon guns were generally added, replacing the old 2 pounder guns in the bridge wings, on either side of 'P' and 'Q' guns and on the quarterdeck. In 1942, Dauntless (and in 1943, Danae) had the aft 4 inch A/A gun replaced by a quadruple mounting Mark VII for the 2 pounder Mark VIII gun and in 1943, Danae and Dragon had 'P' gun and the forward pair of 4-inch (102 mm) guns replaced by two such mountings and their Radar Type 282 equipped directors. Dragon and Danae were taken in hand again in 1943 and had the aft 4 inch / 2 pounder mountings replaced by a twin Mounting Mark XIX for the QF 4 inch Mark XVI gun. Danae also received twin in lieu of single Oerlikon mounts and later received a pair of single Bofors 40 mm guns. Diomede landed her torpedo tubes in 1943 and received one twin mount "Hazemeyer" Mark IV and two single mounts Mark III for Bofors guns.

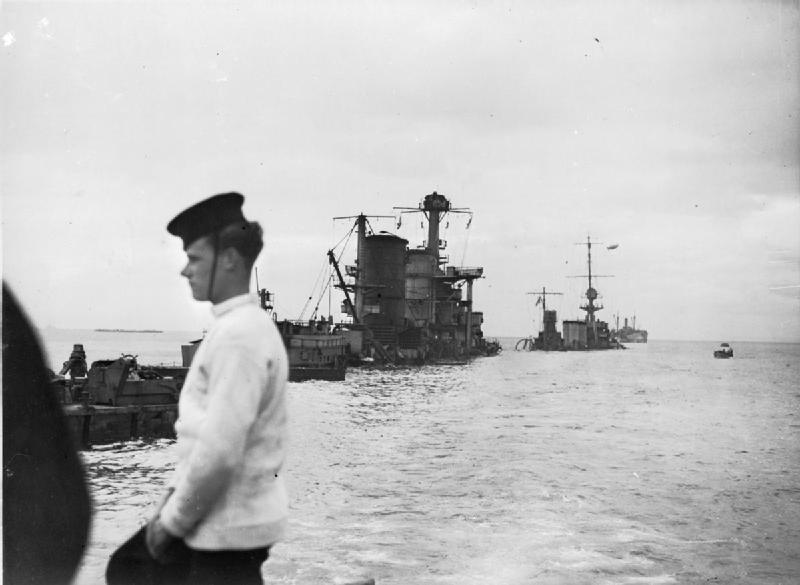
Durban, partially sunk as a breakwater

Between 1941 and 1942, Delhi was rebuilt in the United States as an anti-aircraft vessel. All armaments were removed, and five 5 inch L/38 Mark 12 guns in Mark 30 single mountings were added, controlled by a pair of Mark 37 Fire Control Systems. The guns were in all but the former 'P' position. She carried a new bridge and stepped light tripod masts fore and aft, carrying Type 291 air warning radar. A Type 273 target indication radar was added amidships and a Type 285 on the Mark 37 FCS for target ranging and bearings. The light armament consisted of two quadruple 2 pounder mounts Mark VII and their directors with Radar Type 282, a pair of twin Oerlikon mounts Mark V in the bridge wings and six single Mark III Oerlikon pedestal mounts.

Dragon and Durban were expended as breakwaters in support of the Normandy landings in June 1944, Dragon being replaced in Polish service by the Danae (as ORP Conrad) and Despatch was disarmed as a depot ship.

== Ships ==
Three ships were ordered in Sep 1916 under the War Emergency Programme:

Construction data
Ship name	Pennant no.	Builder	Ordered	Laid down	Launched	Completed	Fate
Danae	32 (Jul 18); 44 (Nov 19); I.44 (1936); D.44 (1940)	Sir W. G. Armstrong Whitworth and Company, High Walker	Sep 1916	11 Dec 1916	26 Jan 1918	18 Jul 1918	Transferred to the Polish Navy as ORP Conrad, 4 Oct 1944 – 28 Sep 1946; sold for breaking up, 22 Jan 1948
Dauntless	71 (Nov 18); 45 (Nov 19); I.45 (1936); D.45 (1940)	Palmers Shipbuilding and Iron Company, Jarrow	Sep 1916	3 Jan 1917	10 Apr 1918	2 Dec 1918	Sold for breaking up, 13 Feb 1946
Dragon	19 (Sep 18); 46 (Nov 19); I.46 (1936); D.46 (1940)	Scotts Shipbuilding and Engineering Company, Greenock	Sep 1916	24 Jan 1917	29 Dec 1917	16 Aug 1918	Transferred to Polish Navy, 15 Jan 1943; damaged by German Neger manned torpedo off Caen, 8 Jul 1944; written off and expended as breakwater off Normandy beaches, 20 Jul 1944
Delhi	6A (Nov 18); 74 (Nov 19); I.74 (1936); D.74 (1940)	Armstrong Whitworth	Jul 1917	29 Oct 1917	23 Aug 1918	7 Jun 1919	Sold for breaking up, 22 Jan 1948
Dunedin	96 (Aug 19); 93 (Nov 19); I.93 (1936); D.93 (1940)	Armstrong Whitworth	Jul 1917	5 Nov 1917	19 Nov 1918	Oct 1919 by Devonport Royal Dockyard	Torpedoed and sunk by the German submarine U-124 off Saint Paul's Rock in the South Atlantic, 24 Nov 1941
Durban	99 (Aug 21); I.99 (1936); D.99 (1940)	Scotts	Jul 1917	22 Jun 1918	29 May 1919	1 Sep 1921 by Devonport Royal Dockyard	Expended as breakwater off Normandy beaches, 9 Jun 1944
Despatch	10 (Jan 22); 30 (19??); I.30 (1936); D.30 (1940)	Fairfield Shipbuilding and Engineering Company, Govan	Mar 1918	8 Jul 1918	24 Sep 1919	2 Jun 1922 by Chatham Royal Dockyard	Sold for breaking up, 5 Apr 1946
Diomede	92 (Jun 22); I.92 (1936); D.92 (1940)	Vickers Limited, Barrow-in-Furness	Mar 1918	3 Jun 1918	29 Apr 1919	24 Feb 1922 by Portsmouth Royal Dockyard	Sold for breaking up, 5 Apr 1946
Daedalus	—N/a	Armstrong Whitworth	Mar 1918	—N/a	—N/a	—N/a	Cancelled 26 Nov 1918
Daring	—N/a	William Beardmore and Company, Dalmuir	Mar 1918	—N/a	—N/a	—N/a	Cancelled 26 Nov 1918
Desperate	—N/a	R. & W. Hawthorn Leslie and Company, Hebburn on Tyne	Mar 1918	—N/a	—N/a	—N/a	Cancelled 26 Nov 1918
Dryad	—N/a	Vickers	Mar 1918	—N/a	—N/a	—N/a	Cancelled 26 Nov 1918
