= History of the Faroe Islands =

The early details of the history of the Faroe Islands are unclear. It is possible that Brendan, an Irish monk, sailed past the islands during his North Atlantic voyage in the 6th century. He saw an 'Island of Sheep' and a 'Paradise of Birds', which some say could be the Faroes with its dense bird population and sheep. This does suggest however that other sailors had got there before him, to bring the sheep. Norsemen settled the Faroe Islands in the 9th or 10th century. The islands were officially converted to Christianity around the year 1000, and became a part of the Kingdom of Norway in 1035. Norwegian rule on the islands continued until 1380, when the islands became part of the dual Denmark–Norway kingdom, under king Olaf II of Denmark.

Following the 1814 Treaty of Kiel that ended the dual Denmark–Norway kingdom, the Faroe Islands remained under the administration of Denmark as a county. During World War II, after Denmark was occupied by Nazi Germany, the British invaded and occupied the Faroe Islands until shortly after the end of the war. Following an independence referendum in 1946 that took place unrecognized by Denmark, the Faroe Islands were in 1948 granted extended self-governance by the Danish Realm with the signing of the Home Rule Act of the Faroe Islands.

== Early Gaelic and Norse settlements ==
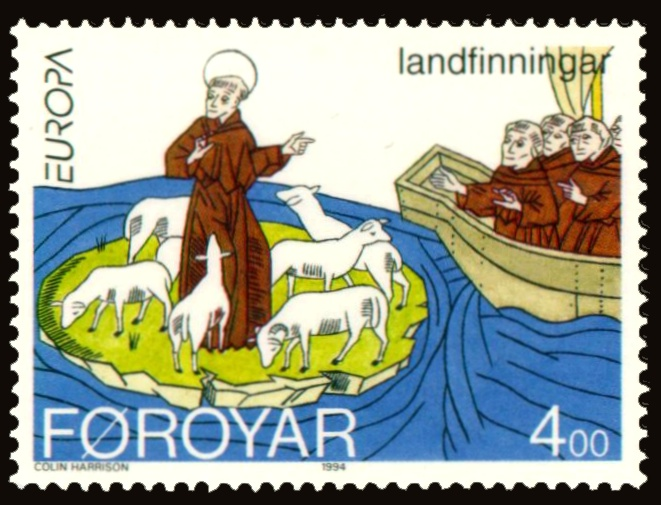
Faroese stamp depicting Saint Brendan discovering the Faroe Islands

There is some evidence of settlement on the Faroe Islands before Norse Viking settlers arrived in the ninth century AD. Scientific researchers found burnt grains of domesticated barley and peat ash deposited in two phases: the first dated between the mid-fourth and mid-sixth centuries, and another between the late-sixth and late-eighth centuries. Researchers have also found sheep DNA in lake-bed sediments, which were dated to around the year 500. Barley and sheep had to have been brought to the islands by humans. It is unlikely the Norse would have sailed near the Faroes long before the early 800s. The first settlers may have come from Britain or Ireland. Archaeologist Mike Church suggested that the people living there might have been from Ireland, Scotland or Scandinavia, or from all three.

According to a ninth-century voyage tale, the Irish saint Brendan visited islands resembling the Faroes in the sixth century. This description, however, is not conclusive.

The earliest text which has been claimed to be a description of the Faroe Islands was written by the Irish monk Dicuil c.825 in his work Liber de Mensura Orbis Terrae (description of the sphere of the earth). Dicuil had met a "man worthy of trust" who related to his master, the abbot Sweeney (Suibhne), how he had landed on islands in the far north after sailing "two days and a summer night in a little vessel of two banks of oars" (in duobus aestivis diebus, et una intercedente nocte, navigans in duorum navicula transtrorum).

"Many other islands lie in the northerly British Ocean. One reaches them from the northerly islands of Britain, by sailing directly for two days and two nights with a full sail in a favourable wind the whole time.... Most of these islands are small, they are separated by narrow channels, and for nearly a hundred years hermits lived there, coming from our land, Ireland, by boat. But just as these islands have been uninhabited from the beginning of the world, so now the Norwegian pirates have driven away the monks; but countless sheep and many different species of sea-fowl are to be found there..."

Norse settlement of the Faroe Islands is recorded in the Færeyinga saga, whose original manuscript is lost. Portions of the tale were inscribed in three other sagas: the Flateyjarbók, the Saga of Óláfr Tryggvason, and AM 62 fol. Similar to other sagas, the historical credibility of the Færeyinga saga is highly questioned.

Both the Saga of Ólafr Tryggvason and the Flateyjarbók claim that Grímr Kamban was the first man to discover the Faroe Islands. The two sources disagree, however, on the year in which he left and the circumstances of his departure. The Flateyjarbók details the emigration of Grímr Kamban as sometime during the reign of Harald Hårfagre, between 872 and 930 AD. The Saga of Óláfr Tryggvason indicates that Kamban was residing in the Faroes long before the rule of Harald Hårfagre, and that other Norse were driven to the Faroe Islands due to his chaotic rule. This mass migration to the Faroe Islands shows a prior knowledge of the Viking settlements' locations, furthering the claim of Grímr Kamban's settlement much earlier. While Kamban is recognized as the first Viking settler of the Faroe Islands, his surname is of Gaelic origin. Writings from the Papar, an order of Irish monks, show that they left the Faroe Islands due to ongoing Viking raids.

== Pre-14th century ==
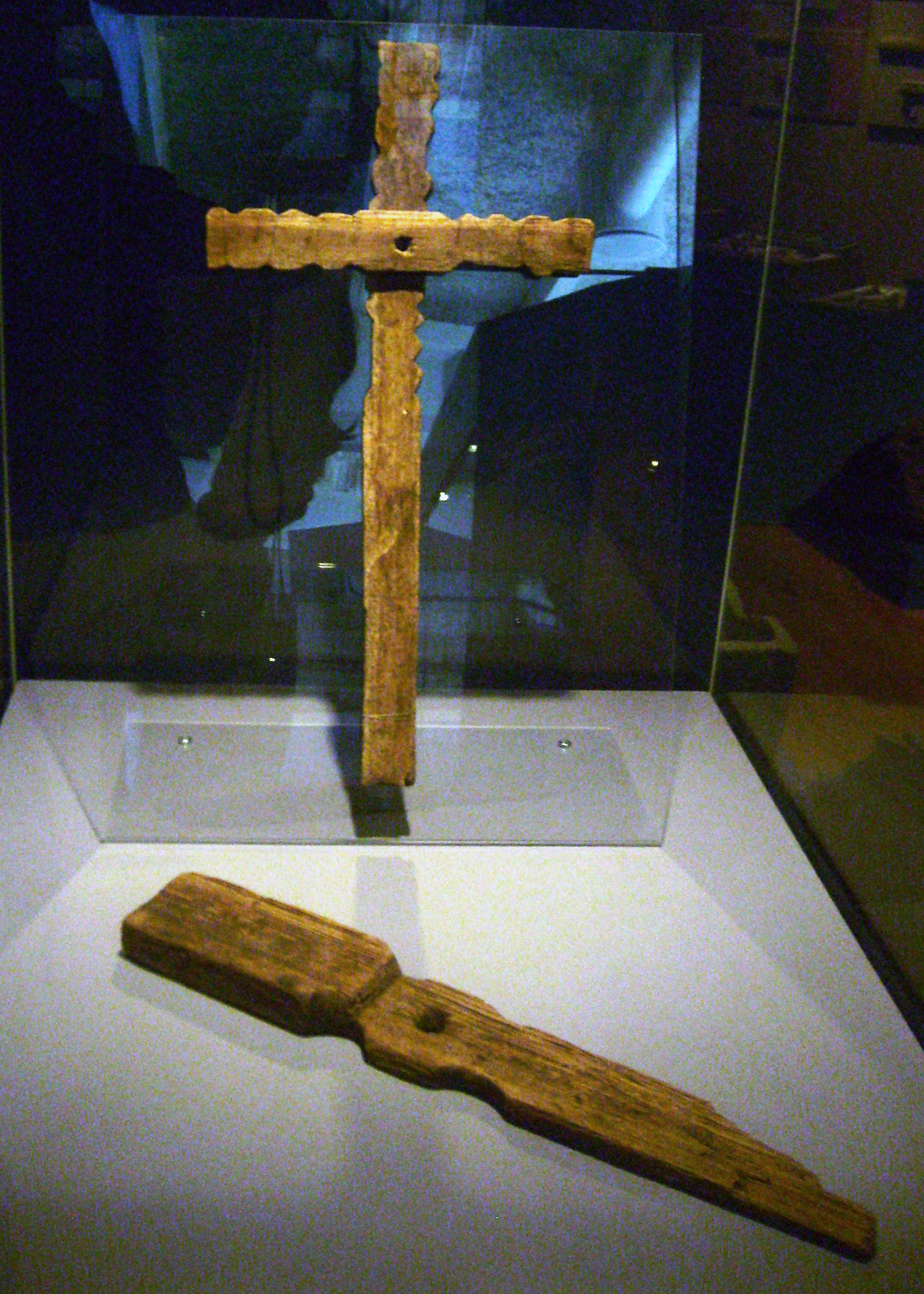
Wooden crosses from Toftanes dating to 860–970, indicating that Christianity existed in the Faroes before official Christianization

The name of the islands is first recorded on the Hereford Mappa Mundi (1280), where they are labelled farei. The name has long been understood as based on Old Norse fár "livestock", thus fær-øer "sheep islands".

The main historical source for this period is the 13th-century work Færeyinga saga (Saga of the Faroese), though it is disputed as to how much of this work is historical fact. Færeyinga saga only exists today as copies in other sagas, in particular the manuscripts called Saga of Óláfr Tryggvason, Flateyjarbók and one registered as AM 62 fol.

According to Flateyjarbók, Grímr Kamban settled in Faroe when Harald Hårfagre was king of Norway (872–930). A slightly different account is found in the version of Færeyinga saga in Ólafs Saga Tryggvasonar:

Maður er nefndur Grímur kamban; hann byggði fyrstur manna Færeyjar. En á dögum Haralds hins hárfagra flýðu fyrir hans ofríki fjöldi manna; settust sumir í Færeyjum og byggðu þar, en sumir leituðu til annarra eyðilanda.

There was a man named Grímr Kamban; he first settled in Faroe. But in the days of Harold Fairhair many men fled before the king's overbearing. Some settled in Faroe and began to dwell there, and others sought to other waste lands.

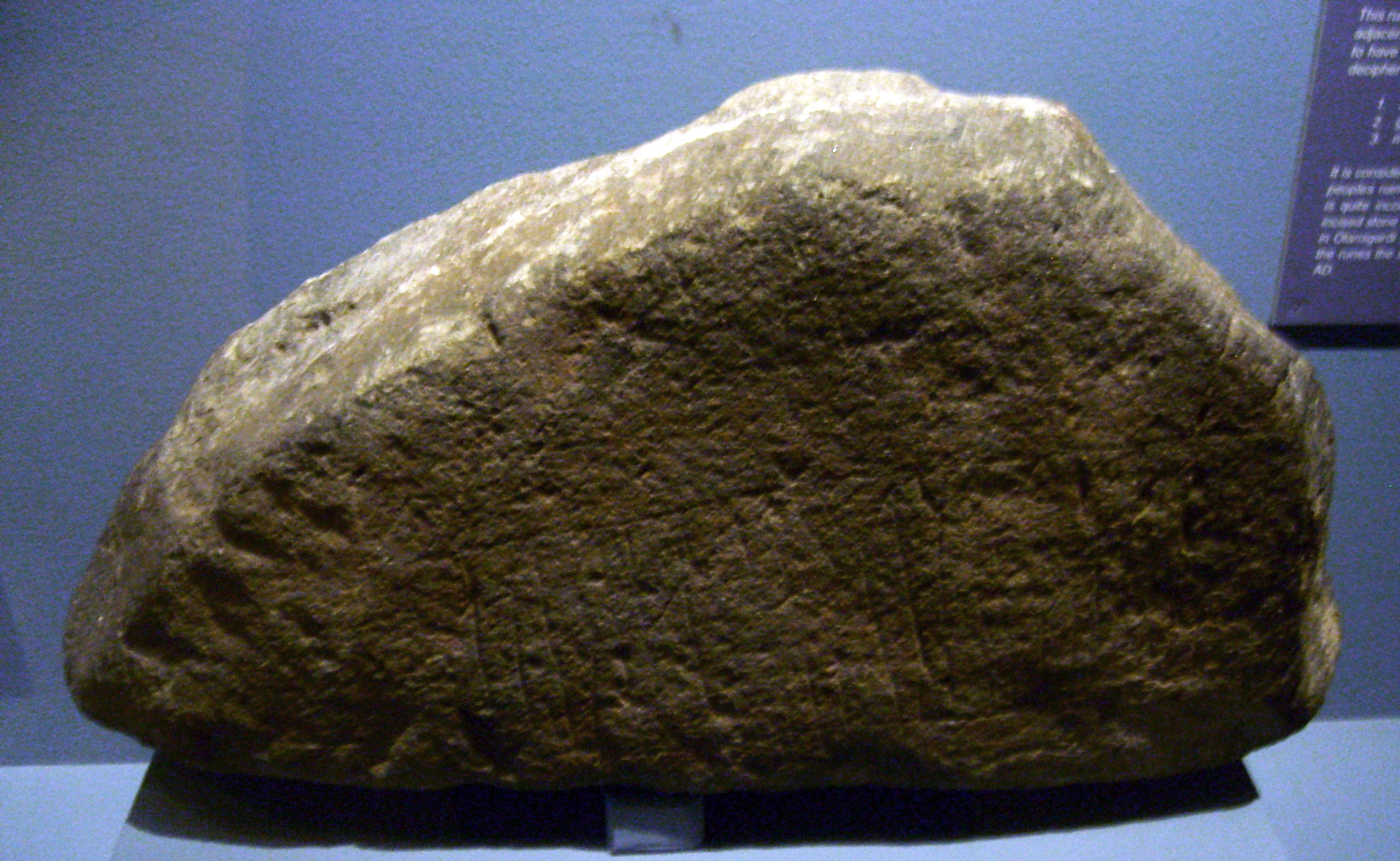
The Kirkjubøur runestone

The text suggests that Grímr Kamban settled in the Faroes some time before the flight from Harald Hårfagre, perhaps even hundreds of years before. His first name, Grímr, is Norse, but his last, Kamban, suggests a Gaelic origin (Cambán). He may have been of mixed Norse and Irish origin and have come from a settlement in the British Isles: a so-called Norse-Gael. The Norse-Gaels had intermarried with speakers of Irish, a language also spoken at the time in Scotland (being the ancestor of Scottish Gaelic). Evidence of a mixed cultural background in later settlers may be found in the Norse-Irish ring pins found in the Faroe Islands, and in features of Faroese vocabulary. Examples of such words (derived from Middle Irish) are: "blak/blaðak" (buttermilk), Irish bláthach; "drunnur" (animal tail), Irish dronn (chine); "grúkur" (head), Irish gruaig (hair); "lámur" (hand, paw), Irish lámh (hand); "tarvur" (bull), Irish tarbh; and "ærgi" (pasture in the outfield), Irish áirge (byre, milking place: Mod. Irish áirí). The discovery at Toftanes on Eysturoy of wooden devotional crosses apparently modelled on Irish or Scottish exemplars suggests that some of the settlers were Christian. It has also been suggested that the typical curvilinear stone-built walls enclosing early ecclesiastical sites in the Faroes (as in Norse settlements elsewhere) reflect a Celtic Christian style, seen in the circular enclosures of early ecclesiastical sites in Ireland. Indirect support for this theory has been found in genetic research showing that many Norse settler women in the Faroe Islands had Celtic forebears.

If there was settlement in the Faroes in the reign of Harald Hårfagre, it is possible that people already knew about the Faroes because of previous visitors or settlers.

The fact that immigrants from Norway also settled in the Faroe Islands is proven by a runestone (see Sandavágur stone) found in the village of Sandavágur on Vágoy Island. It says:

Þorkil Onundsson, austmaþr af Hrua-lande, byggþe þe(n)a staþ fyrst.

Thorkil Onundsson, eastman (Norwegian) from Rogaland, settled first in this place (Sandavágur)

This description "eastman" (from Norway) has to be seen together with the description "westman" (from Ireland/Scotland), which is to be found in local place-names such as "Vestmanna-havn" i.e. "Irishmen's harbour" in the Faroe Isles, and "Vestmannaeyjar" i.e. "Irishmen's islands" in Iceland.

At Toftanes barley grains and hazelnut shells have been found embedded in the floor 2 of viking houses and dated to around AD 900.

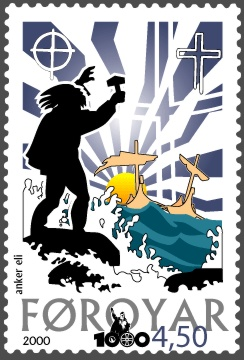
Faroese stamp depicting Tróndur í Gøtu raising the hammer of Thor against Christianity

According to Færeyinga saga there was an ancient institution on the headland called Tinganes in Tórshavn on the island of Streymoy. This was an Alþing or Althing (All-council.) This was the place where laws were made and disputes solved. All free men had the right to meet in the Alþing. It was a parliament and law court for all, thus the name. Historians estimate the Alþing to have been established from 800 to 900.

The islands were officially converted to Christianity around the year 1000, with the Diocese of the Faroe Islands based at Kirkjubøur, southern Streymoy, of which there were 33 Catholic bishops.

The Faroes became a part of the Kingdom of Norway in 1035. Early in the 11th century Sigmund or Sigmundur Brestisson, whose family had flourished in the southern islands but had been almost exterminated by invaders from the islands of the north, was sent from Norway, to where he had escaped, to take possession of the islands for Olaf Tryggvason, king of Norway. He introduced Christianity, and, though he was subsequently murdered, Norwegian supremacy was upheld and continued.

King Sverre of Norway was brought up in the Faroes, being stepson of a Faroese man, and relative to Roe, bishop of the islands.

== Foreign commercial interest: 14th century to Second World War ==
The 14th century saw the start of what would prove to be a long era of foreign encroachment on the Faroese economy. At this time trading regulations were set up so that all Faroese commerce had to pass through Bergen, Norway, in order to collect customs tax. Meanwhile, the Hanseatic League was gaining in power, threatening Scandinavian commerce. Though Norway tried to halt this, it was forced to desist after the Black Death decimated its population.

Norwegian supremacy continued until 1380, when the islands became part of the Kalmar Union. The islands were still a possession of the Norwegian crown since the crowns had not been joined. In 1380 the Alþting was renamed the Løgting, though it was by now little more than a law court.

In 1390s, Henry I Sinclair, Earl of Orkney, took possession of the islands (as vassal of Norway, however) and for some time they were part of the Sinclair principality in the North Atlantic.

Archaeological excavations on the islands indicate sustained pig keeping up to and beyond the 13th century, a unique situation when compared to Iceland and Greenland. The Faroese at Junkarinsfløtti remained dependent upon bird resources, especially puffins, far longer and to a greater degree than with any of the other Viking Age settlers of the North Atlantic islands.

English adventurers gave great trouble to the inhabitants in the 16th century, and the name of Magnus Heinason, a native of Streymoy, who was sent by Frederick II to clear the seas, is still celebrated in many songs and stories.

=== Reformation era ===
In 1535 Christian II, the deposed monarch, tried to regain power from King Christian III who had just succeeded his father Frederick I. Several of the powerful German companies backed Christian II, but he eventually lost. In 1537 the new King Christian III gave the German trader Thomas Köppen exclusive trading rights in the Faroes. These rights were subject to the following conditions: only good quality goods were to be supplied by the Faroese and were to be made in numbers proportionate to the rest of the market; the goods were to be bought at their market value; and the traders were to deal fairly and honestly with the Faroese.

Christian III also introduced Lutheranism to the Faroes, to replace Catholicism. This process took five years to complete, in which time Danish was used instead of Latin and church property was transferred to the state. The bishopric at Kirkjubøur, south of Tórshavn, where remains of the cathedral may be seen, was also abolished.

After Köppen, others took over the trading monopoly, though the economy suffered as a result of the Dano-Swedish war between Denmark–Norway and Sweden. During this period of the monopoly most Faroese goods (wool products, fish, meat) were taken to the Netherlands, where they were sold at pre-determined prices. The guidelines of the trading agreement, however, were often ignored or corrupted. This caused delays and shortages in the supply of Faroese goods and a reduction in quality. With the trading monopoly nearing collapse smuggling and piracy were rife.

=== 1600s onwards ===
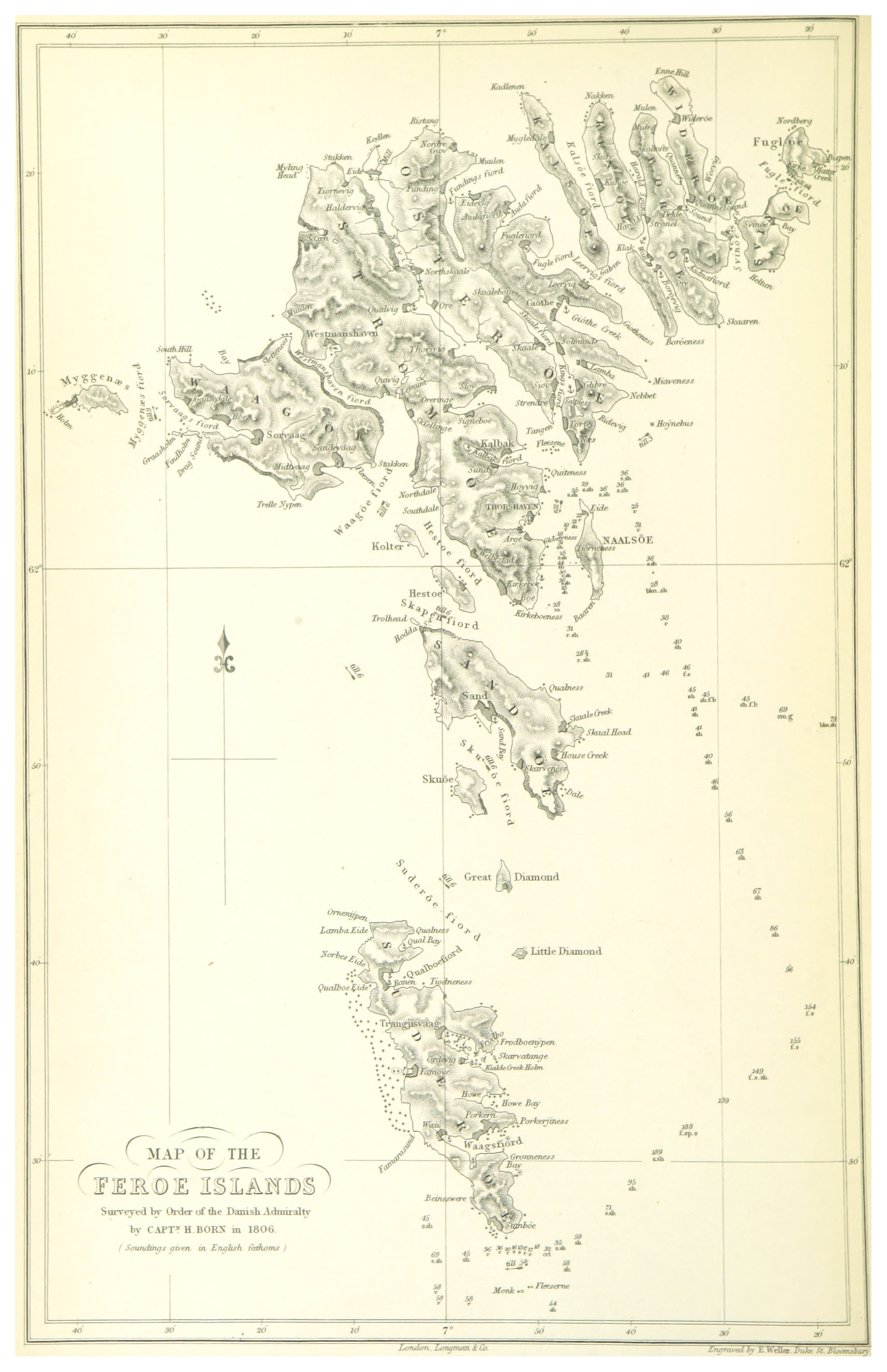
English map of the Faroe Islands in 1806

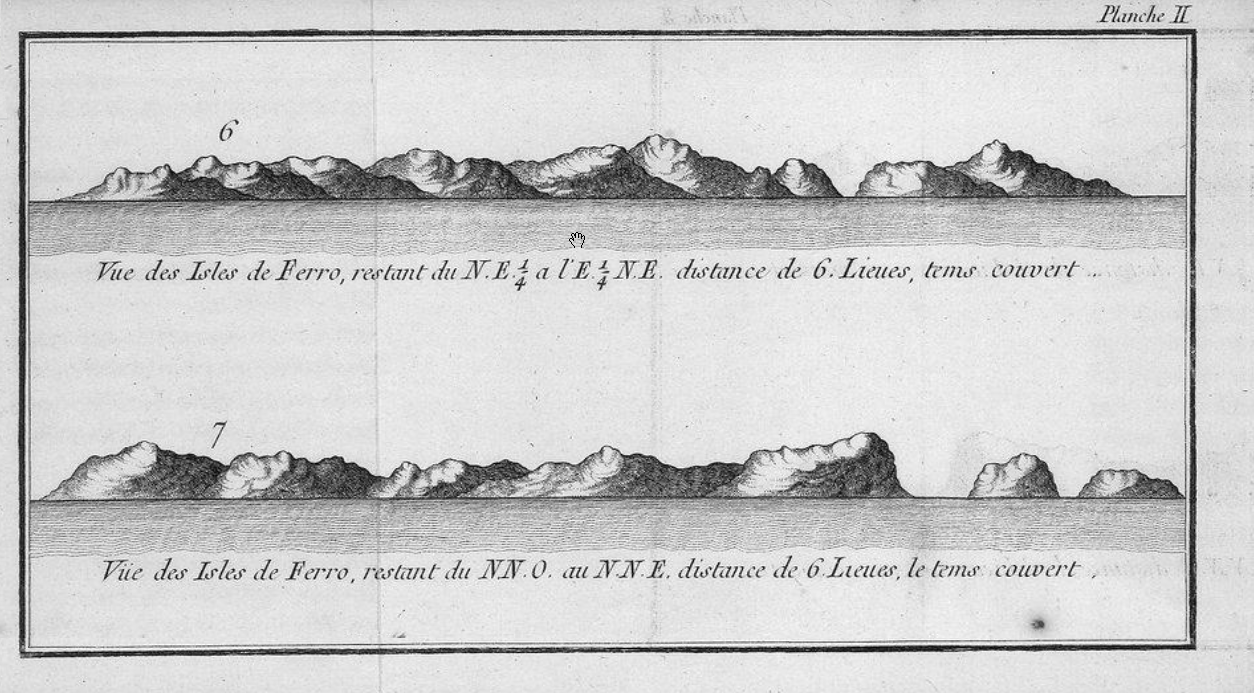
The Faroe Islands as seen by the French navigator Yves-Joseph de Kerguelen-Trémarec in 1767

The Danish king tried to solve the problem by giving the Faroes to the courtier Christoffer Gabel (and later on his son, Frederick) as a personal feudal estate. However, the Gabel rule was harsh and repressive, breeding much resentment in the Faroese. This caused Denmark–Norway, in 1708, to entrust the islands and trading monopoly once more to the central government. However, they too struggled to keep the economy going, and many merchants were trading at a loss. Finally, on 1 January 1856 the trading monopoly was abolished.

The Faroe Islands, Iceland and Greenland became a part of Denmark at the Peace of Kiel in 1814, when the union of Denmark–Norway was dissolved.

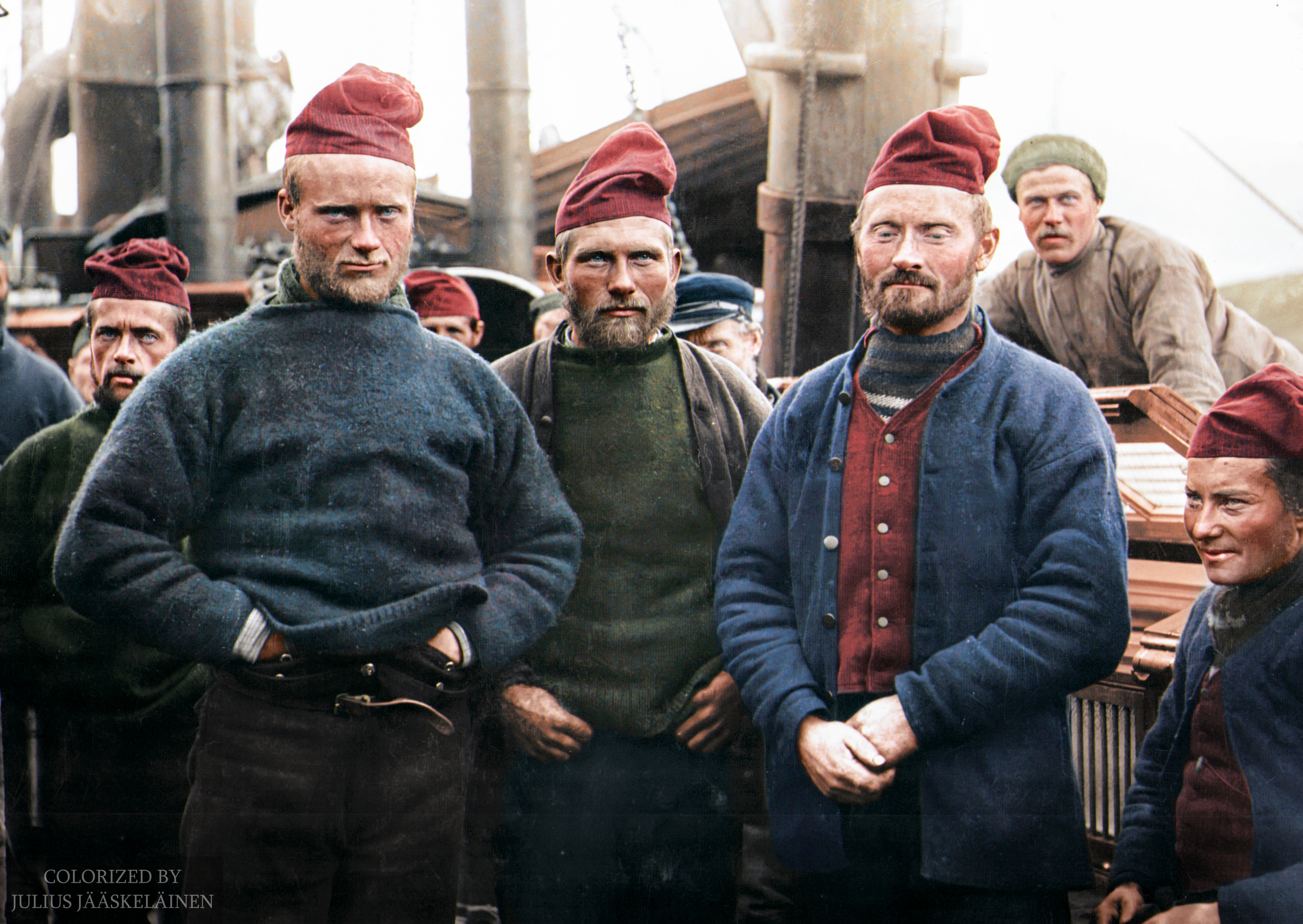
Faroese fishermen in 1898

In 1816 the Løgting (the Faroese parliament) was officially abolished and replaced by a Danish judiciary. Danish was introduced as the main language, whilst Faroese was discouraged. In 1849 a new constitution came into use in Denmark and was promulgated in the Faroes in 1850, giving the Faroese two seats in the Rigsdag (Danish parliament). The Faroese, however, managed in 1852 to re-establish the Løgting as a county council with an advisory role, with many people hoping for eventual independence. The late 19th century saw increasing support for the home rule/independence movement, though not all were in favour. Meanwhile, the Faroese economy was growing with the introduction of large-scale fishing. The Faroese were allowed access to the large Danish waters in the North Atlantic. Living standards subsequently improved and there was a population increase. Though Faroese was standardized as a written language in 1890, it was not allowed to be used in public schools until 1938, or in the church (Fólkakirkjan) until 1939.

== World War II ==
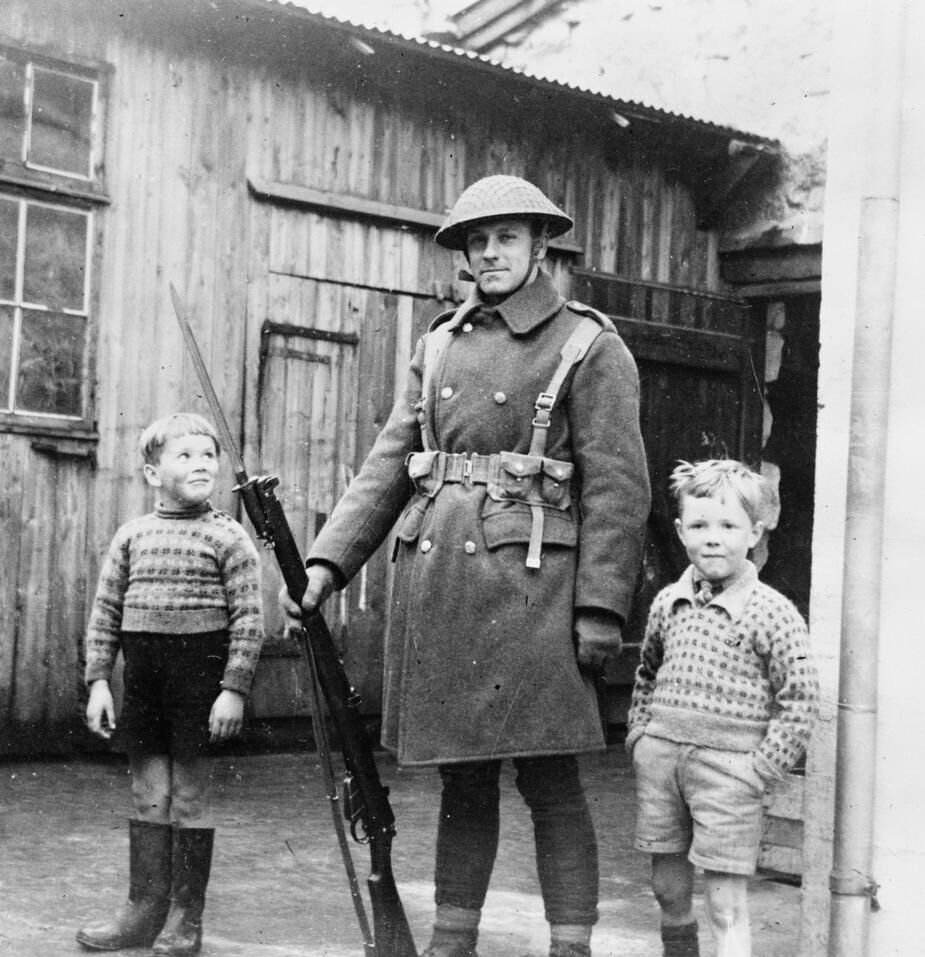
British Army soldier with local children in Tórshavn

During the Second World War, Denmark was invaded and occupied by Nazi Germany. The British subsequently made a pre-emptive invasion and occupation of the Faroes, known as Operation Valentine, to prevent a German invasion. Given their strategic location in the North Atlantic, the Faroes could have proved useful to Germany in the Battle of the Atlantic, possibly as a submarine base. Instead, the British forces built an airbase on Vágar, which is still in use as Vágar Airport. Faroese fishing boats also provided a large amount of fish to the UK, which was crucial given food rationing.

The Løgting gained legislative powers, with the Danish prefect Carl Aage Hilbert retaining executive power. The Faroese flag was recognized by British authorities. There were some attempts to declare complete independence in this period, but the UK had given an undertaking not to interfere in the internal affairs of the Faroe Islands nor to act without the permission of a liberated Denmark. The experience of wartime self-government was crucial in paving the way for formal autonomy in 1948.

The British presence was broadly popular (particularly given the alternative of a German occupation). Approximately 150 marriages took place between British soldiers and Faroese women, although the scale of the British presence on Vágar did lead to some local tensions. The British presence also left a lasting popularity for British chocolate and sweets, which are readily available in Faroese shops but uncommon in Denmark.

== Post-World War II: Home Rule ==
Following the liberation of Denmark and the end of World War II, the last British troops left in September 1945. Until 1948 the Faroes had the official status of a Danish amt (county). A referendum on full independence was held in 1946, which produced a majority in favour. This was, however, not recognised by the Danish Government or king, as only 2/3 of the population participated in the referendum, and the margin of victory for independence was extremely narrow (less than the number of invalid ballots). To resolve the crisis, the monarch dissolved the Løgting, leading to fresh legislative elections. The elections were won by an anti-independence majority; instead of independence, a high degree of self-governance was attained in 1948 with the passing of the Act of Faroese Home Rule. Faroese was now an official language, though Danish is still taught as a second language in schools. The Faroese flag was also officially recognised by Danish authorities.

In 1973 Denmark joined the European Community (now European Union). The Faroes refused to join, mainly over the issue of fishing limits.

The 1980s saw an increase in support for Faroese independence. Unemployment was very low, and the Faroese were enjoying one of the world's highest standards of living, but the Faroese economy was almost entirely reliant on fishing. The early 1990s saw a dramatic slump in fish stocks, which were being overfished with new high-tech equipment. During the same period the government was also engaged in massive overspending. National debt was now at 9.4 billion Danish krones (DKK). Finally, in October 1992, the Faroese national bank (Sjóvinnurbankin) called in receivers and was forced to ask Denmark for a huge financial bailout. The initial sum was 500 million DKK, though this eventually grew to 1.8 billion DKK (this was in addition to the annual grant of 1 billion DKK). Austerity measures were introduced: public spending was cut, there was a tax and VAT increase and public employees were given a 10% wage-cut. Much of the fishing industry was put into receivership, with talk of cutting down the number of fish-farms and ships.

It was during this period that many Faroese (6%) decided to emigrate, mainly to Denmark. Unemployment rose to as much as 20% in Tórshavn, and even higher in the outlying islands. In 1993 the Sjóvinnurbankin merged with the Faroe Islands' second largest bank, Føroya Banki. A third was declared bankrupt. Meanwhile, there was a growing international boycott of Faroese produce because of the grindadráp (whaling) issue. The independence movement dissolved on the one hand while Denmark found itself left with the Faroe Islands' unpaid bills on the other.

Recuperative measures were put in place and largely worked. Unemployment peaked in January 1994 at 26%, since which it fell (10% in mid-1996, 5% in April 2000). The fishing industry survived largely intact. Fish stocks also rose, with the annual catch being 100,000 in 1994, rising to 150,000 in 1995. In 1998 it was 375,000. Emigration also fell to 1% in 1995, and there was a small population increase in 1996. In addition, oil was discovered nearby. By the early 21st century weaknesses in the Faroese economy had been eliminated and, accordingly, many minds turned once again to the possibility of independence from Denmark. However, a planned referendum in 2001 on first steps towards independence was called off following Danish Prime Minister Poul Nyrup Rasmussen saying that Danish money grants would be phased out within four years if there were a 'yes' vote.

== See also ==
- Timeline of Faroese history
- Faroese language conflict

== Bibliography ==
- Church, MJ, Arge, SV, Brewington, S, McGovern, TH, Woollett, JM, Perdikaris, S, Lawson, IT, Cook, GT, Amundsen, C. Harrison, R, Krivogorskaya, Y and Dunar, E. (2005). Puffins, Pigs, Cod and Barley: Palaeoeconomy at Undir Junkarinsfløtti, Sandoy, Faroe Islands. Environmental Archaeology 10#2 pp: 179–197.
