= 970 =

Calendar year

970 in various calendars
- Gregorian calendar: 970; CMLXX
- Ab urbe condita: 1723
- Armenian calendar: 419; ԹՎ ՆԺԹ
- Assyrian calendar: 5720
- Balinese saka calendar: 891–892
- Bengali calendar: 376–377
- Berber calendar: 1920
- Buddhist calendar: 1514
- Burmese calendar: 332
- Byzantine calendar: 6478–6479
- Chinese calendar: 己巳年 (Earth Snake); 3667 or 3460 — to — 庚午年 (Metal Horse); 3668 or 3461
- Coptic calendar: 686–687
- Discordian calendar: 2136
- Ethiopian calendar: 962–963
- Hebrew calendar: 4730–4731
- Hindu calendars
- Vikram Samvat: 1026–1027
- Shaka Samvat: 891–892
- Kali Yuga: 4070–4071
- Holocene calendar: 10970
- Iranian calendar: 348–349
- Islamic calendar: 359–360
- Japanese calendar: Anna 3 / Tenroku 1 (天禄元年)
- Javanese calendar: 871–872
- Julian calendar: 970; CMLXX
- Korean calendar: 3303
- Minguo calendar: 942 before ROC 民前942年
- Nanakshahi calendar: −498
- Seleucid era: 1281/1282 AG
- Thai solar calendar: 1512–1513
- Tibetan calendar: ས་མོ་སྦྲུལ་ལོ་ (female Earth-Snake); 1096 or 715 or −57 — to — ལྕགས་ཕོ་རྟ་ལོ་ (male Iron-Horse); 1097 or 716 or −56

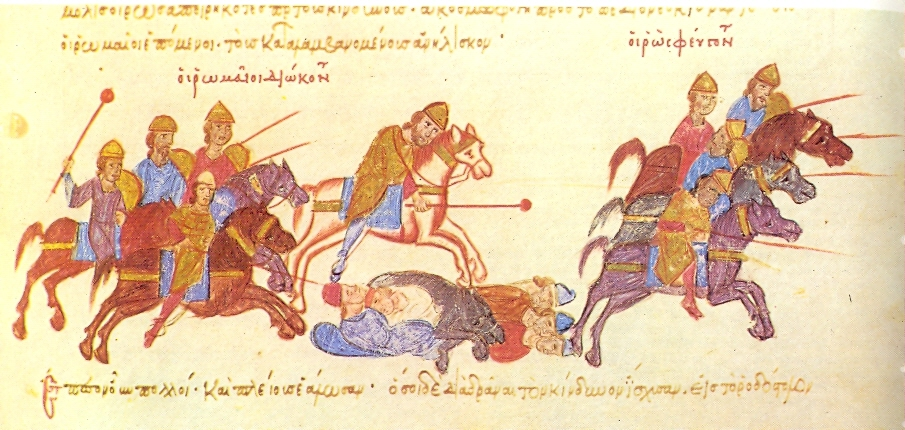
The Byzantines persecute the fleeing Rus'.

Year 970 (CMLXX) was a common year starting on Saturday of the Julian calendar, the 970th year of the Common Era (CE) and Anno Domini designations, the 970th year of the 1st millennium, the 70th year of the 10th century, and the 1st year of the 970s decade.

== Events ==
=== By place ===
==== Byzantine Empire ====
- Emperor John I delegates the war in the Balkans to his brother-in-law, the Domestic of the Schools Bardas Skleros, and to the eunuch general Peter Phokas, who begin to gather a Byzantine army in Thrace. At the news of this, a powerful Kievan expeditionary force (30,000 men), along with many Bulgarians and a Pecheneg contingent, is sent south over the Balkan Mountains. After sacking the Bulgarian stronghold of Philippolis (modern-day Plovdiv), they bypass the heavily defended city of Adrianople, and turn towards Constantinople.
- Battle of Arcadiopolis: John I dispatches an elite force (10–12,000 men) to delay the Kievan Rus'. The Byzantines under Bardas Skleros successfully ambush the Kievan-Bulgarian invaders at Arcadiopolis (modern Turkey). The battle turns into a complete rout, killing thousands. Grand Prince Sviatoslav I is driven out of Thrace and withdraws his forces to the fortress city of Silistra.
- Summer – Bardas Phokas (the Younger) and his family rebel against their own cousin, John I. Bardas is proclaimed 'emperor' by his troops at Caesarea, but the rebellion is extinguished by Bardas Skleros. Phokas and his relatives are captured and exiled to the island of Chios (Aegean Sea).

==== Europe ====
- Summer – Byzantine-Imperial truce: Emperor Otto I (the Great) meets with John I at Bari and accepts a permanent peace agreement. Pandulf I (Ironhead) is released from captivity in Constantinople (see 969).
- The oldest preserved document (by Otto I) mentions Leibnitz in Styria (modern Austria).
- Eric the Victorious becomes the first (documented) king of Sweden in Uppland.
- Skagul Toste leads a Viking expedition to England and demands Danegeld.

==== Africa ====
- Al-Hasan ibn Ubayd Allah, Ikhshidid governor of Palestine, is defeated and taken prisoner by General Ja'far ibn Fallah in Syria. Ending the Ikhshidid Dynasty as a ruling power.
- Construction is completed on Al-Azhar Mosque in Cairo, Egypt (the world's oldest Islamic university).

==== Asia ====
- A major volcano erupts in Lake Mashū, Japan (approximate date).

== Births ==
- Adelaide, German abbess and saint (d. 1015)
- Al-Sharif al-Radi, Persian Shi'ite scholar and poet (d. 1015)
- Bartholomew of Grottaferrata, Italian abbot (d. 1055)
- Constantine III, king of Scotland (approximate date)
- Fulk III of Anjou (the Black), French nobleman (d. 1040)
- Gerberga, German noblewoman (approximate date)
- Hedwig, French noblewoman (approximate date)
- Henry of Schweinfurt, German nobleman (d. 1017)
- Henry of Speyer, German nobleman (approximate date)
- Heribert, archbishop of Cologne (approximate date)
- Leif Erikson, Norse Viking explorer (approximate date)
- Otto II, duke of Lower Lorraine (approximate date)
- Procopius of Sázava, Czech hermit and abbot (d. 1053)
- Radim Gaudentius, Polish archbishop (approximate date)
- Richard of Verdun, French abbot (d. 1046)
- Rudolph III, king of Burgundy (approximate date)
- Sergius IV, pope of the Catholic Church (d. 1012)
- Sitt al-Mulk, Fatimid princess and regent (d. 1023)
- Wifred II, Spanish nobleman (approximate date)
- William III, French nobleman (approximate date)
- Xu Daoning, Chinese painter (approximate date)

== Deaths ==
- January 18 – Hatto II, archbishop of Mainz
- January 30 – Peter I, emperor of Bulgaria
- February 5 – Polyeuctus, patriarch of Constantinople
- February 22 – García I, king of Pamplona
- June 15 – Adalbert, bishop of Passau
- August 31 – Han Xizai, Chinese official (b. 902)
- November 1 – Boso, bishop of Merseburg
- Abu'l-Fadl ibn al-'Amid, Persian statesman
- Al-Qassab, Abbasid warrior-scholar
- Beinir Sigmundsson, Viking chieftain
- Brestir Sigmundsson, Viking chieftain
- Erenfried II, Frankish nobleman (approximate date)
- Fernán González, Frankish count of Castile
- Fujiwara no Saneyori, Japanese statesman (b. 900)
- Harald II (Greycloak), king of Norway
- Hasdai ibn Shaprut, Jewish diplomat (approximate date)
- Menahem ben Saruq, Jewish philologist (approximate date)
- Minamoto no Saneakira, Japanese nobleman (b. 910)
- Oswulf, bishop of Ramsbury (approximate date)
- Taksony, Grand Prince of Hungary (approximate date)
- Willa of Tuscany, queen consort of Italy
