= Ann Naddodsdóttir =

Possible daughter of Naddodd

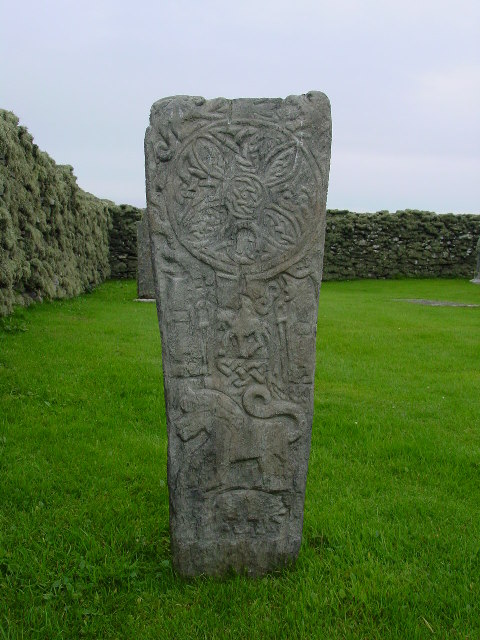
The stone with Ann's name on it

Ann Naddodsdóttir (Old Norse: Ann Naddoðsdōttir; fl. c. 10th century) was possibly a daughter of Naddoddr, the Viking attributed with the discovery of Iceland.

== Bressay Stone ==
Her name may appear on a gravestone outside the cemetery of a church in Bressay, Shetland. In 1864, a stone slab was found outside the cemetery, dating from the early 10th century. The slab features carved Christian crosses and decorations of Scandinavian origin on the front and back faces. It also has various lettering carved along the edges in the ogham alphabet.

In 1996, Celtic historian Katherine Forsyth from Harvard University managed to decipher the text as part of her Ph.D. dissertation.

One text says

- "᚛ᚉᚏᚏᚑᚄᚄᚉᚉ᚜ → CRRO[S]SCC (gaelic for "cross")
- "᚛ᚅᚐᚆᚆᚈᚃᚃᚇᚇᚐᚇᚇᚄ᚜" → NAHHTVVDDA[DD]S
- "᚛ᚇᚐᚈᚈᚏᚏ᚜" → DATTRR (Norse for "daughter")
- "᚛ᚐᚅᚅ" → [A]NN [--]

And the other says:

- " ᚁᚓᚅᚔᚄᚓᚄ ᚋᚓᚊᚊ ᚇᚇᚏᚑᚐᚅᚅ᚜" → BEN[I]SES MEQQ DDR[O]ANN (MEQQ is Gaelic for "Mac", son-of)

It mentions the following names: Nahhtvdda[dd]s, Ben[i]ses, Ddr[o]ann

See Ogham inscriptions

According to Dr. Forsyth (and other previous scientists) it can be translated in Old Norwegian to: "HER: KROSSUR: NADDODDSDÓTTIR: ANN" and: "(AV) BEINIR SONUR DRÓIN"

Dr. Forsyth (2020) has also noted the possibility of DATTRR representing a Pictish cognate of Gaulish duxtir, likewise meaning "daughter".

== Descendant theory ==
Forsyth says that this Ann Naddodsdóttir was a Faroese Viking. The son Beinir Dróinsson (MacDroan) who raised the grave might be identical to Beinir Sigmundsson who according to Færeyinga saga was the brother of Brestir Sigmundsson who together ruled their own half of the Faroe Islands. They both died in 970. Brestir's son Sigmundur Brestisson apparently introduced Christianity to the Faroe Islands in 999. If this is true Sigmundur was already of Christian faith at birth.
