= Ravnur Hólmgarðsfari =

Ravnur Hólmgarðsfari was a 10th century Norwegian sailor and merchant mentioned in the Færeyinga saga.

Ravnur was born in Tønsberg, Norway. His name indicates that he was a regular visitor to Novgorod, which implies that he was a merchant. In the summer of 970, Ravnur came to Tórshavn, capital of the Faroe Islands. There he offered the chief Tróndur í Gøtu the boys Sigmundur Brestisson and Tóri Beinisson as slaves for sale. Becoming aware that the two boys were sons of the brothers Bestir and Beinir, whom Tróndur had previously murdered, Tróndur rejected the offer. Tróndur instead offered Ravnur money so as to bring the boys away from the Faroes. The sagas report that Ravnur treated the boys excellently, bringing them back with him to Viken in Norway.
