= Sigmundsson =

Sigmundsson is a surname. Notable people with the surname include:

- Sigurd, the legendary dragonslayer, sometimes known with the patronymic Sigmundsson
- Þorgrímur Sigmundsson, Icelandic politician
- Beinir Sigmundsson (10th century – c. 970), chieftain in the Faroe Islands
- Brestir Sigmundsson (10th century -ca. 970), chieftain in the Faroe Islands
- Freyr Gauti Sigmundsson (born 1972), Icelandic judoka
- Ivar Sigmundsson (born 1942), Icelandic alpine skier
- Kristinn Sigmundsson (born 1951), Icelandic operatic bass

== See also ==
- Siegmundsburg
- Sigmundstor
