= Leivur Øssursson =

Faroese chieftain

Leivur Øssursson (Leif Øssursson)
- Born: circa 980; Possibly Norðragøta, Faroe Islands
- Died: Before 1047
- Occupation: Chieftain
- Known for: Reign during the Viking age in the Faroe Islands
- Spouse: Tóra Sigmundardóttir
- Father: Øssur Havgrímsson

Leivur Øssursson or Leif Øssursson (born ca. 980 - died before 1047) was a chieftain in the Faroe Islands, before they were taken over by Norway in 1035. Leivur's reign marked the beginning of the end of the Viking age, and the end of independence in the Faeroes.

Leivur Øssursson was the son of Øssur Havgrímsson. It is unclear when and where Leivur was born, but we know that it was before 983 when his father died at the age of 23. His birthplace was possibly Norðragøta, where his father lived with Tróndur í Gøtu in Hov. His father owned a farm at Skúvoy and other farms at Brestir and Beinir. He was married to Tóra Sigmundardóttir, the daughter of Sigmundur Brestisson and Turið Torkilsdóttir.

In 1024, King Olaf II of Norway invited some of the chieftains of the Faroes, including Tórolvur Sigmundsson and Leivur Øssursson, to travel to Norway to become his deputies. However, as long as Tróndur í Gøtu lived, it was clear that King Olaf would not have full control of the Faroes. After Tróndur í Gøtu's death in 1035, King Magnus Olafsson claimed control of the Faeroes. By the latter half of the 12th century, the Faroe Islands became firmly attached to the Kingdom of Norway.
