= Naddodd =

Norse Viking who discovered Iceland

- Born: late 8th century Kingdom of Agder
- Died: after 825; Faroe Islands
- Occupation: Explorer
- Known for: Discovering Iceland
- Children: Ann Naddodsdóttir

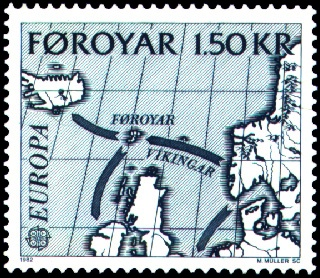
Route of the Vikings Faroe Postal Service, 15 March 1982

Naddodd (Old Norse: Naddoðr [ˈnɑdːoðr] or Naddaðr [ˈnɑdːɑðr]; Icelandic: Naddoður [ˈnatːɔːðʏr̥]; Faroese: Naddoddur; fl. c. 9th century) was a Norse Viking who is credited with the discovery of Iceland.

== Biography ==
Naddodd was born in Agder in what is today southern Norway. He was one of the earliest settlers on the Faroe Islands after Grímr Kamban became the first to settle there around 825.

Landnámabók, a medieval Icelandic manuscript, describes in considerable detail the settlement of Iceland (Icelandic: landnám) by the Norse in the 9th and 10th centuries. According to the Landnámabók, Iceland was discovered by Naddodd, who was sailing from Norway to the Faroe Islands, but got lost and drifted to the east coast of Iceland. Naddodd came upon the shore of a land with a bay and mountains near what is today the Icelandic town of Reyðarfjörður.

Although he climbed a mountain to look for smoke rising from fireplaces, he saw no sign of human activity. Naddodd decided to continue his journey to the Faroe Islands, but as he returned to his boat, it started to snow, so he named the land Snowland (Snæland). The island was later known as Iceland (Ísland) following the settlement of Hrafna-Flóki Vilgerðarson.

According to Landnámabók, Naddodd's wife, Jorunn, was a daughter of Olvir the Child-Sparer. Their sons Brondolf and Mar came to Iceland early in the Age of Settlement and established settlements there.

Naddodd was the probable father of Ann Naddodsdóttir from Shetland. Naddodd was distantly related to Erik the Red and his son, Leif Erikson.

== See also ==
- Ingólfr Arnarson
- Settlement of Iceland
