= Al-Qassab =

Muslim warrior-scholar, exegete and Hadith specialist

Personal life
- Born: Muhammad al-Karaji Karaj, Iran
- Died: 970
- Era: Islamic Golden Age
- Region: Iranian plateau

Religious life
- Religion: Islam
- Denomination: Sunni

Muslim leader
- Influenced: Ibn Hazm

Abu Ahmad Muhammad bin Ali bin Muhammad al-Karaji, better known as al-Qassab, was a Muslim warrior-scholar, exegete and specialist in Hadith studies. He has, at times, been confused with his son Abu al-Hasan Ahmad bin Muhammad bin Ali bin Muhammad al-Karaji.

== Life ==
Qassab lived in Karaj in Central Iran. He died in the year 360 according to the Islamic calendar, corresponding to 970 on the Gregorian calendar. Having been a soldier under the Abbasid Caliphate, he received the nicknamed Qassab or "the butcher" due to his skill on the battlefield and the large number of opponents he slayed.

In his exegesis of the Qur'an, he would often refer to linguistic arguments in order to prove his point. Qassab was noted among Muslim theologians as holding the view that the testimony of a convicted criminal could later be accepted in unrelated cases if they performed a public repentance for their own crime. Like Ibn Hazm who would come after him, Qassab did not accept the Hadith regarding rejection of the convict's testimony as authentically linked to the Islamic prophet Muhammad. The issue is a much debated one in Islamic law.

== Works ==
Qassab authored an exegesis of the Qur'an centered on its applications in Islamic law.

=== Edited works ===
- Nukat al-Qur'an al-Dallah 'ala al-Bayan. Eds. Ali al-Tuwaijiri, Ibrahim al-Junaydil and Shayi' al-Asmari. Dammam: Dar Ibn al-Qaiyim; Cairo: Dar Ibn 'Affan, 2003. 4 volumes.
