= Janus Djurhuus =

Faroese poet

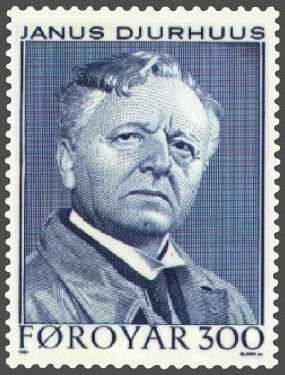
Janus Djurhuus on a stamp of the Faroe Islands issued in 1984

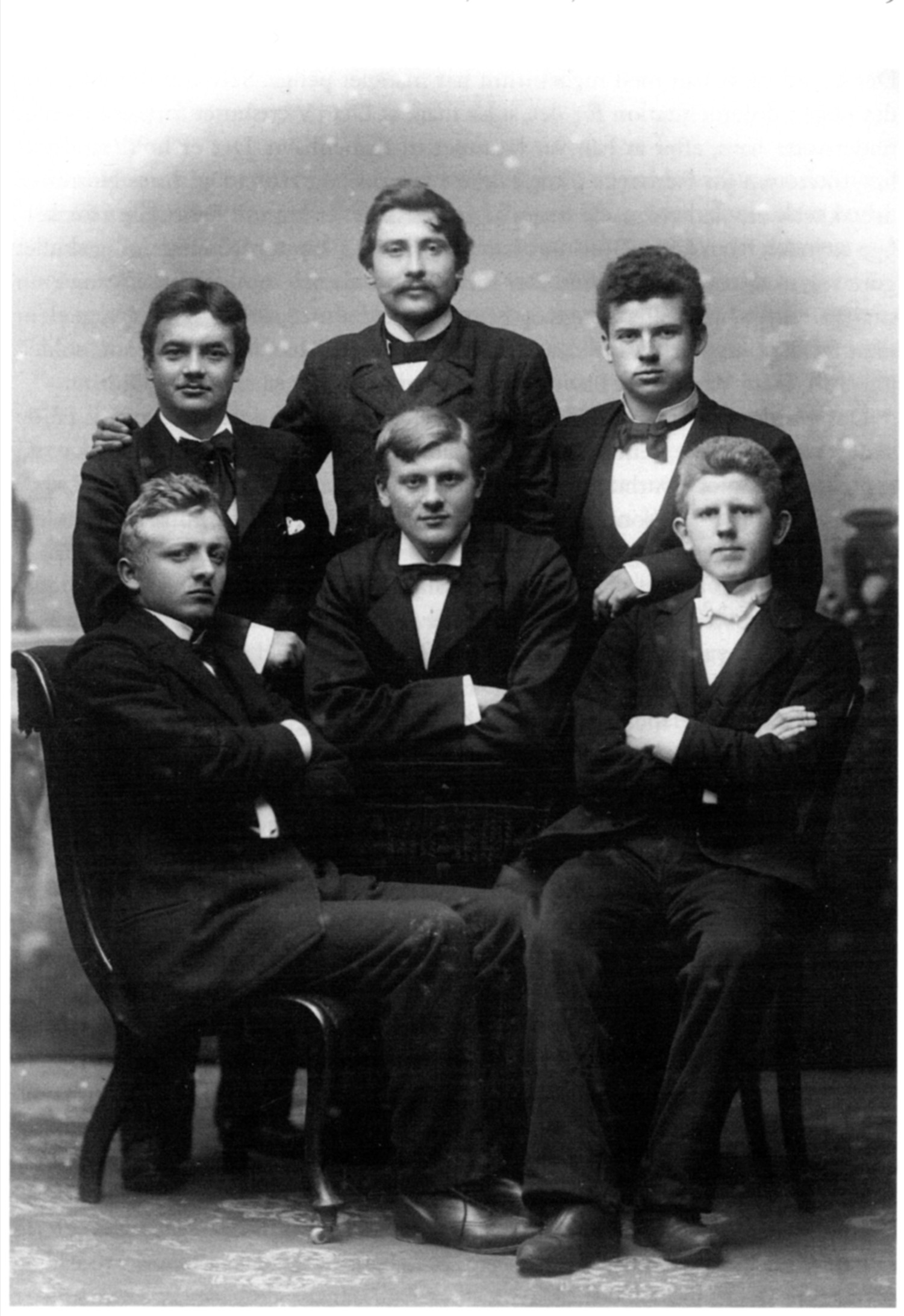
Janus Djurhuus (front row, left) in 1900 with (back row, left to right) Jákup Dahl, Magnus Dahl and Jógvan Waagstein; (front row) Petur Dahl and Oluf Skaalum

Jens Hendrik Oliver Djurhuus, called Janus Djurhuus, (26 February 1881, Tórshavn – 1 September 1948, Tórshavn) was the first modern Faroese poet. He and his younger brother Hans Andreas Djurhuus, also a poet, are called the Áarstova brothers after the house where they grew up.

== Life and work ==
Djurhuus's parents were Óla Jákup Djurhuus (1832–1909) and Else Marie née Poulsen, from Hósvík (1847–1897). He was a great-grandson of Jens Christian Djurhuus.

Djurhuus said that his "poetic baptism" came in school, when he heard Jákup Dahl (later a provost and Bible translator and author of the first school grammar of the Faroese language) declaim Jóannes Patursson's Nú er tann stundin komin til handa (Now is the hour come for acting), the anthem of the Christmas Meeting of 1888 which began the rise of Faroese nationalism.

Djurhuus trained as a lawyer. After passing the preliminary examinations in 1897, he went to Denmark for university preparation, first in Copenhagen and then in Bornholm. He passed the qualifying examinations in 1900, graduated with the cand. jur. degree in 1911, and then practised in Copenhagen until the late 1930s, when he returned to the Faroes to practise there. However, he kept in touch with his homeland through students.

His first published poem was "Blíð er summarnátt á Føroya landi", in 1901. In 1914 he published Yrkingar (Poems), the first collection of a single poet's work published in Faroese. He published four further collections of poems.

Djurhuus had also studied classical philology, and also published accomplished Faroese translations of Ancient Greek and Latin works, including some of Plato's Dialogues and poetry by Sappho, and (posthumously) a poetic translation of the Iliad. (He also published translations of poetic works by Goethe, Dante, Heinrich Heine and Gustaf Fröding). There is a story that on one occasion when a Greek steamer called at Tórshavn, he went on board and sent a cabin boy for the captain. On his arrival, he began to recite the Odyssey in Ancient Greek. The astonished captain joined in.

His poetry combines Classical and Norse mythology. The language of his poems draws on both modern Faroese and the language of the traditional ballads, as well as ancient and modern poetry in other Scandinavian languages; their rhythm is also influenced by ancient Greek and modern German poetry.

== Literary reputation ==
Djurhuus's poetry represented the breakthrough into modern literature in Faroese. His poetry has been judged "among the best" of modern Scandinavian writing, "splendid... of great vision and musicality" and some consider him the greatest Faroese poet, "the first Faroese writer of genius", "without a doubt a great poet".

He was a national romantic, but his works show what has been described as poetic idealisation and love of his homeland conflicting with "something of a revulsion from [its] reality" and as "doubt and pessimism, a result of the clash between [his] powerful, pathetic dream of beauty and petty, miserable reality". "Útlegd" (Exile—referring to his many years in Denmark) is an example of this pessimism.

== Selected works ==
=== Poetry ===
- Yrkingar. Copenhagen: Hitt Føroyska Studentafelagið, 1914. Rev. ed. 1923. OCLC 41390587
- Nyggjar Yrkingar. Copenhagen: Hitt Føroyska Studentafelagið, 1938. OCLC 465720164
- Carmina. Tórshavn: H.N. Jacobsen, 1941. OCLC 729143860
- Moriendo. Tórshavn: Norrøna forlagið, 1944. OCLC 19884120
- Yrkingar 1898-1948. Ed. Christian Matras. Copenhagen: Mentunargrunnur Studentafelagsins, 1988. OCLC 25370149 (Collected edition)

=== Translations ===
- Plato. Symposion—Gorgias. Copenhagen: Føroyingafelag, 1938. OCLC 44024260
- Homer. Ilionskvæði. Tórshavn, 1967. OCLC 559676478

== Honours ==
On 20 September 2004, the Faroese post office honoured Djurhuus with a block of ten stamps, designed by Anker Eli Petersen, depicting ten of his poems. It was chosen as the popular favourite amongst their stamp issues for the year.

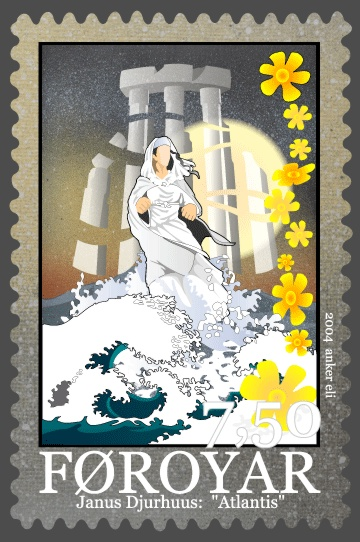
"Atlantis"

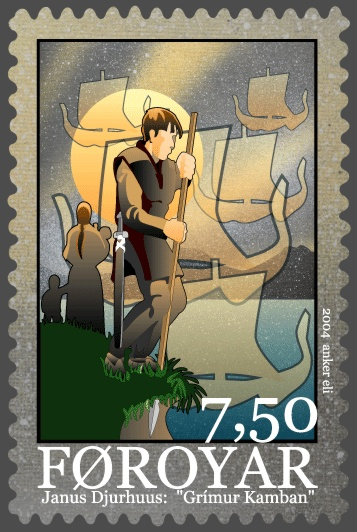
"Grímur Kamban"

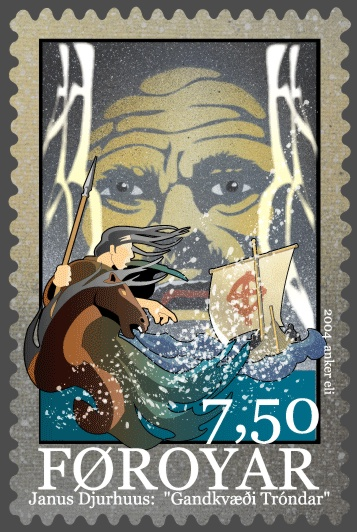
"Gandkvæði Tróndar" (Curse of Tróndur í Gøtu)

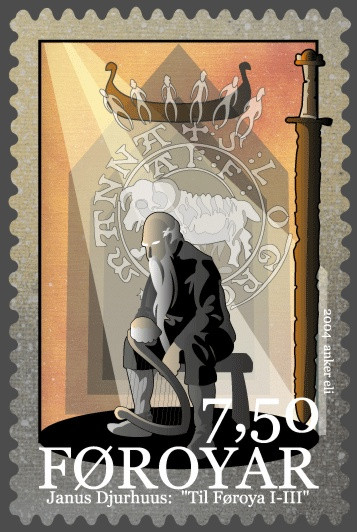
"Til Føroya I–III" (To the Faroes I–III)

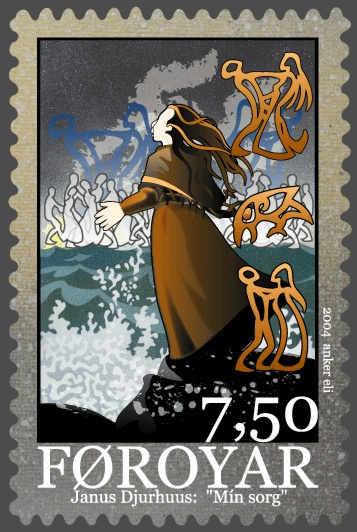
"Mín Sorg" (My Sorrow)

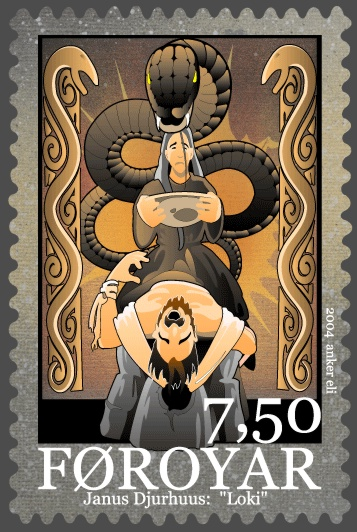
"Loki"

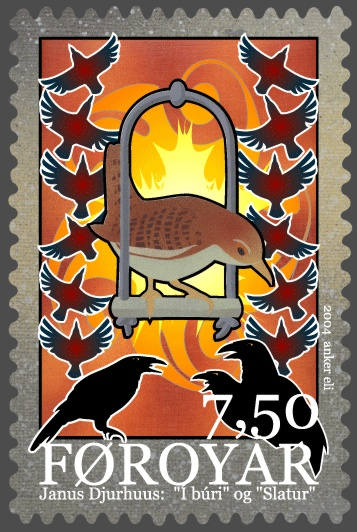
"I búri" and "Slatur" ("Songbird" and "Gossip")

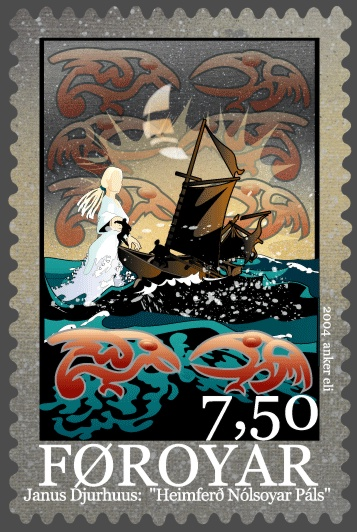
"Heimferð Nólsoyar Páls" ("Return of Nólsoyar Páll")

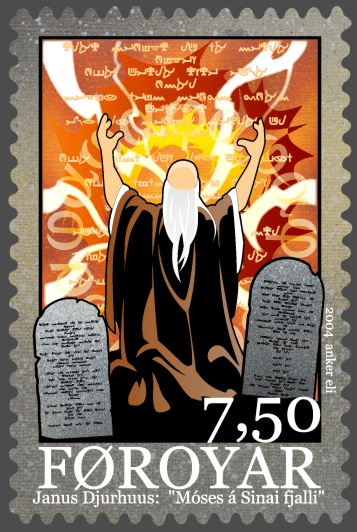
"Móses á Sinai fjalli" (Moses on Mount Sinai")

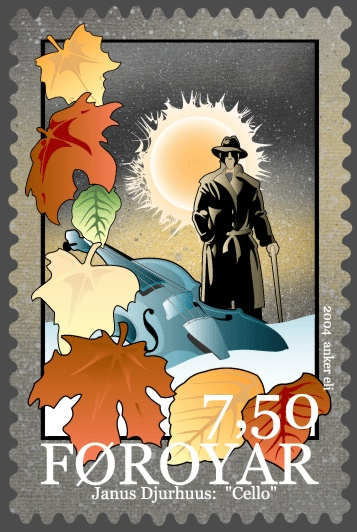
"Cello"

== Sources ==
- Chr. Holm Isaksen. Føroyskur skaldskapur í 19. øld: Páll Nólsoy; Jóannes Paturrson; J. H. O. Djurhuus. Bókmentagreinir 1. Tórshavn: Fannir, 1981. OCLC 472830743 (in Faroese)
- Hanus Andreassen. J.H.O. Djurhuus: ein bókmentalig ævisøga. Volume 1 1881 – 1904, Volume 2 1904 – 1929, Volume 3 1929 – 1948. Tórshavn: Mentunargrunnur Studentafelagsins, 1994–97. ISBN 978-99918-43-02-5 (in Faroese)
- Hanus Kamban, tr. Kirsten Brix. J. H. O. Djurhuus: en litterær biografi Volume 1 1881 – 1922, Volume 2 1922 – 1948. Odense University studies in Scandinavian languages and literatures 46. Odense: Odense University, 2001, 2002. ISBN 978-87-7838-604-5 (in Danish) (translation of above)
