= Grímur Kamban =

Norse explorer

- Born: 8/9th century Norway
- Died: 9/10th century Faroe Islands
- Occupation: Settler
- Known for: First Norse to appear in Faroe Islands

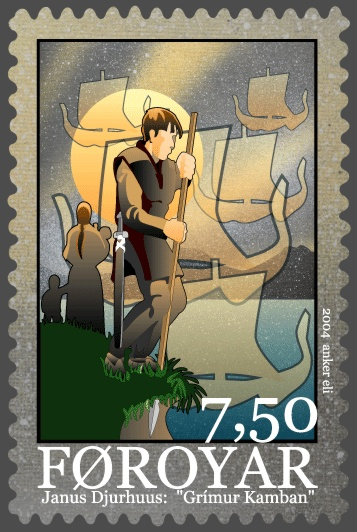
Faroese stamp issued in 2004 commemorating the poem Grímur Kamban by Janus Djurhuus

Grímur Kamban was, according to the Færeyinga saga, the first Norse settler in the Faroe Islands. The modern Faroese form of the name is Grímur, but it was Grímr in Old Norse and is often anglicised as Grim.

== Settlement of the Faroe Islands ==
The saga says he was a Norwegian Viking escaping the tyranny of the Norwegian King Harald (Haraldr Hárfagri). However, this is an error in this saga, because Harald's age was in the late 9th century, while the first Norse settlers reached the Faroes after 825.

"According to the Færeyinga saga... the first settler in the Faroe Islands was a man named Grímr Kamban – Hann bygdi fyrstr Færeyar, it may have been the land taking of Grímr and his followers that caused the anchorites to leave... the nickname Kamban is probably Gaelic and one interpretation is that the word refers to some physical handicap, another that it may point to his prowess as a sportsman. Probably he came as a young man to the Faroe Islands by way of Viking Ireland, and local tradition has it that he settled at Funningur in Eysturoy."

It is said that he settled down in Funningur on Eysturoy. The name funningur means finding. Excavations have shown Viking Age houses in this area, as well as all over the Faroes.

== Name ==
Grímr is an Old Norse name. The name Kamban indicates Celtic origins. Thus he could have been a man from Ireland, the Western Isles or the Isle of Man, where the Vikings already had settlements. Another theory says, he could have been an early Christianized Norwegian under the influence of Irish monks there.

If Gaelic, the first part of Kamban would originate in the Old Gaelic camb "crooked". The name Kamban is therefore most likely be derived from cambán "crooked one" (cf. Modern Irish camán, Scots Gaelic caman and Manx camane). The root camb is also found in the Gaelic names Campbell (originally caimbeul) "crooked-mouth" and Cameron (camshròn) "crooked nose", as well as the sports term cambóg, which in Gaelic refers to the type of stick used in games like hurling, hockey and golf.

== Tribute ==
On 20 September 2004, the Faroese post office issued a stamp including honoring the poem Grímur Kamban by Faroese poet Janus Djurhuus (1881–1948).

== See also ==
- Norse settlement in the Faroe Islands

== Related reading ==
- John Haywood (2016) Northmen: The Viking Saga, AD 793–1241 (Macmillan) ISBN 9781250106155
