= Færeyinga saga =

Saga of the Faroe Islands

Færeyinga saga, Old Norse for the Faroe-Islander Saga (Icelandic pronunciation:; Faroese: Føroyinga søga; Danish: Færingesagaen), the saga of the Faroe Islanders, is the story of how the Faroes were converted to Christianity and became a part of Norway, originally written down in the 13th century.

== Summary ==
The saga was written in Iceland shortly after 1200. The author is unknown and the original manuscript is lost to history, but passages of the original manuscript have been copied in other sagas, especially in two manuscripts: Óláfs saga Tryggvasonar en mesta and Flateyjarbók.

The different sagas differ somewhat on the first settlement of the Faroes. Historians have understood from the beginning of Færeyinga Saga in Flateyjarbók that Grímur Kamban settled in the Faroes when Harald Fairhair was king of Norway (c.872-930 AD). This does not correspond with the writings of the Irish monk Dicuil.

However, the version from Óláfs saga Tryggvasonar does correspond with the writings of Dicuil. The opening text is, "There was a man named Grímr Kamban; he first settled in Faroe. But in the days of Harald Fairhair many men fled before the king's overbearing." The first man to settle in the Faroe Islands is, according to this text, a man with a Norse first name and a Gaelic last name. This suggests that he might have come from Norse–Gael settlements to the south in Scotland or Ireland and probably was not Norwegian.

The text says that many men fled from Norway when Harald Fairhair was king there, but it also says that the isles were settled before that.

== Synopsis ==
The protagonist and antihero of the story is Þrándr Þorbjarnarson (in Modern Faeroese Tróndur í Gøtu), who lives at Gøta on Eysturoy. At the beginning of the story, the Faeroe Islands are split in two, with the northern islands ruled by Þrándr's cousins Brestir and Beinir Sigmundsson, while the southern islands are ruled from Suðuroy by a certain Hafgrímr. Þrándr manipulates the Sigmundssons and Hafgrímr into fighting a battle on Stóra Dímun, which results in the deaths of all three men. He then sells the Sigmundssons' young sons, Sigmundr Brestisson and Þórir Beinisson, into slavery in Norway and takes over the northern islands for himself; the southern islands are inherited by Hafgrímr's son Ǫzurr.

Sigmundr and Þórir are eventually freed by their owner, and they subsequently enter the service of Hákon illi, the Jarl of Hlaðir, for whom they fight in a series of campaigns, most notably the Battle of Hjörungavágr against the famous Jomsvikings. Having built up a reputation as warriors, they return home to the Faeroes, kill Ǫzurr Hafgrímsson and take control of the southern Faeroes. They then force Þrándr to turn over the northern islands to them as well, and they also coerce him into paying them weregild (compensation) for their fathers' deaths.

Around AD 995, the adventurer Olaf Tryggvason kills Jarl Hákon and becomes King of Norway. Óláfr is a Christian, and he promptly sets about trying to convert Norway and its neighbouring territories to this new religion. To this end he invites Sigmundr to Norway, persuades him to accept Christianity and instructs him to convert the Faeroe Islands. Sigmundr's initial attempt to promulgate the new religion at the Tórshavn þing is defeated by Þrándr, who mobilises the farmers against him, so he launches a night raid on Gøta, captures Þrándr and forces him to convert under threat of death. With their leader subverted, the Faroese pagans quickly yield, and the islanders adopt Christianity as their new religion.

Þrándr is keen to take revenge, but bides his time. Several years later he and his hot-tempered nephew Sigurðr Þorláksson launch a surprise attack on Sigmundr's farm on Skúvoy. Sigmundr and Þórir escape by leaping into the sea, and they subsequently attempt to swim all the way to Suðuroy, but the effort pushes them to the limits of their endurance. Þórir drowns just offshore, and although an exhausted Sigmundr manages to make it onto the beach he is then murdered by a local farmer, Þorgrímr inn illi, who desires his gold ring. Þorgrímr subsequently buries the corpses of Sigmundr and Þórir to prevent his crime being uncovered.

Þrándr seizes control of the Faeroes, granting half to Leifr Ǫzurarson (son of Ǫzurr Hafgrímsson). He makes several offers of compensation to Sigmundr's widow and her young sons, but they refuse. Eventually he proposes a marriage between Leifr and Sigmundr's daughter Þóra, which the latter accepts on condition that Þrándr track down her father's killer. Þrándr uses pagan necromancy to summon up the spirits of Sigmundr and Þórir, which relate to him how they died. Armed with this information, Þrándr confronts Þorgrímr, who confesses to killing Sigmundr and is promptly hanged at Tórshavn.

Þrándr, his nephew Sigurðr and Leifr continue to rule the Faeroe Islands for many years, extending through the reigns of the Norwegian kings Óláfr Haraldsson and Sveinn Knútsson. However, over time Sigurðr becomes overconfident, listening less and less to the advice of the cunning Þrándr, and he also becomes increasingly impetuous and violent, committing a series of brutal killings (including that of Leifr Þórisson, son of Þórir Beinisson) which make him unpopular with the islanders. Eventually Leifr Ǫzurarson and the three sons of Sigmundr Brestisson conspire to kill Sigurðr, although two of the Sigmundarsons are killed in the attempt and the third is crippled. As the last man left standing, Leifr Ǫzurarson is left as the sole ruler of the Faeroes, and the saga ends with him travelling to Norway to pay homage to the new king there, Magnús Óláfsson.
