= Stóra Dímun =

- Island
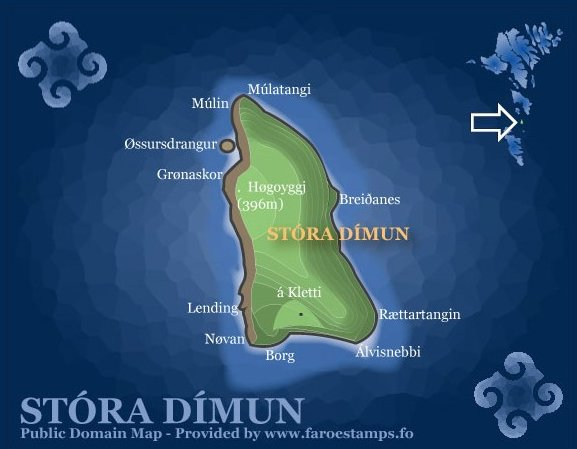
- Map of Stóra Dímun

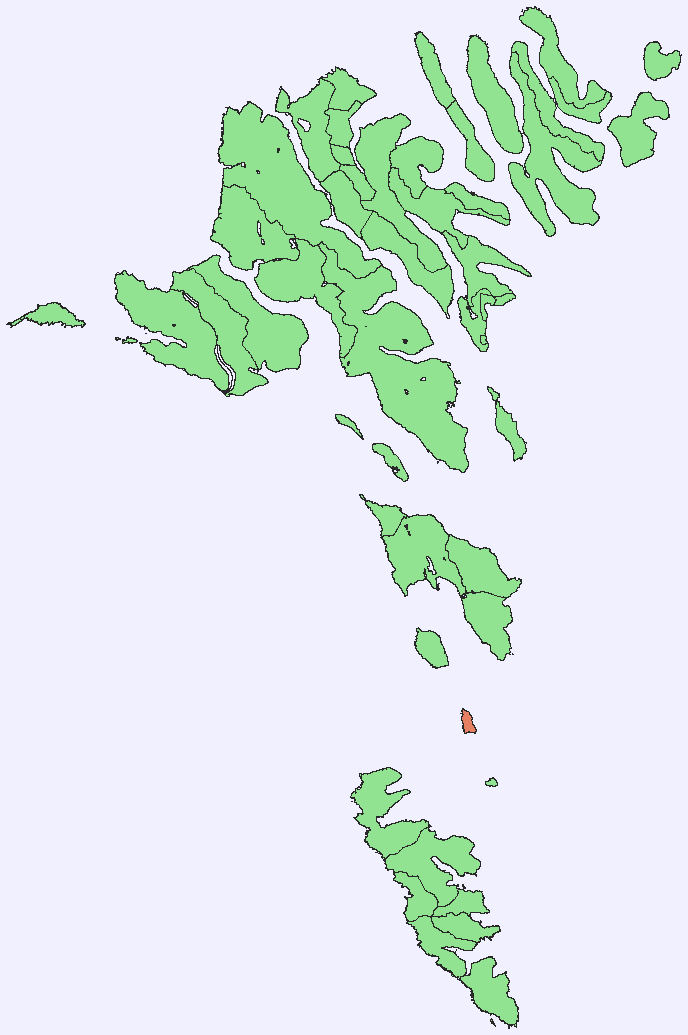
- Location within the Faroe Islands
- Coordinates: 61°41′N 6°44′W
- State: Kingdom of Denmark
- Constituent country: Faroe Islands

Area
  - Total: 2.5 km^{2} (0.97 sq mi)
- Highest elevation: 396 m (1,299 ft)

Population (September 2025)
  - Total: 5
  - Density: 2.0/km^{2} (5.2/sq mi)
- Time zone: UTC+00:00 (GMT)
  - Summer (DST): UTC+01:00 (EST)
- Postal code: FO 286
- Calling code: 298

Stóra Dímun (Danish: Stor Dímun) is an island in the southern Faroe Islands, sometimes only referred to as Dímun. It is accessible by sea only during periods of clear and calm weather, but there is a regular helicopter service twice a week all year. There is a lighthouse on the island. It is part of Skúvoy municipality.

== Etymology ==
The name 'Stóra Dímun' means 'Great Dimun', in contrast to 'Lítla Dímun' or 'Little Dimun'. According to the Faroese placename expert Jakobsen, 'Dimun' may represent a pre-Norse, Celtic placename element, with 'di' representing 'two'. Stora and Litla Dímun shows a pairing of two distinctive but separate localities in one name. Gammeltoft concluded Dímun is a Scandinavian place name for a double-peaked feature of a particular appearance, reflecting a linguistic contact between Scandinavians and Gaels.

== Population ==
Before 1920, the ruins of an old church were present, but these no longer exist. There are two peaks on Stóra Dímun: Høgoyggj (396 metres; 1,299 ft) and Klettarnir (308 metres; 1,010 ft). The island was once home to many families from the 13th century onwards, but in 2018 only seven people in two families made their home on the island. In September 2025 the island population was 5.

== The farm ==
There is only one farm at the Southside of the island, and it constitutes its only settlement. The farm benefits from soil that has been fertilized by the guano of millions of seabirds for thousands of years. This gives excellent grazing for the 450 ewes that the island supports. The farm is famed for their turnips and sheepskin, of which they produce some 300-400 each year.

Six to eight calves are slaughtered every year.

There is some tourism during the summer months.

== Important bird area ==
The island has been identified as an Important Bird Area by BirdLife International because of its significance as a breeding site for seabirds, especially European storm petrels (15,000 pairs), Atlantic puffins (40,000 pairs) and black guillemots (50 pairs).

== Gallery ==
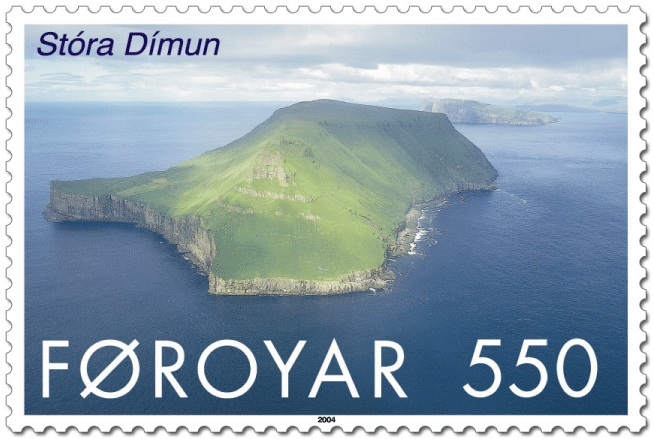
Aerial view of Stóra Dímun
Stamp FO 475 of Postverk Føroya
Issued: 16 Jan 2004

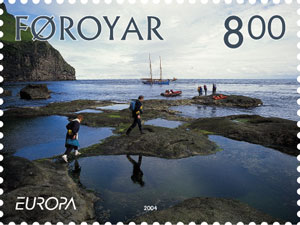
Coast of Stóra Dímun
Stamp FO 490 of Postverk Føroya
Issued: 2004

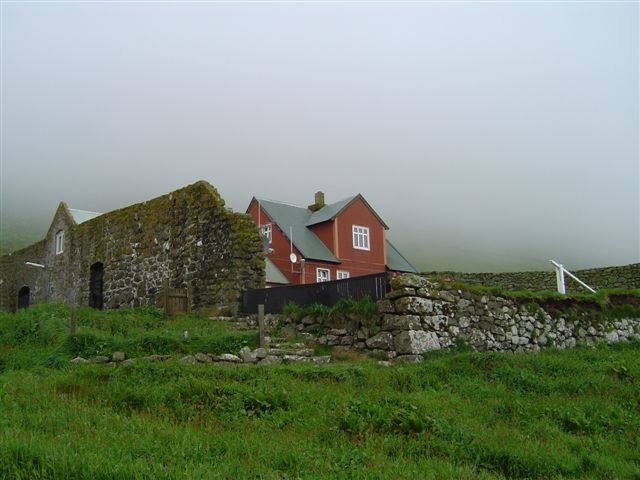
The farm on the island of Stóra Dímun

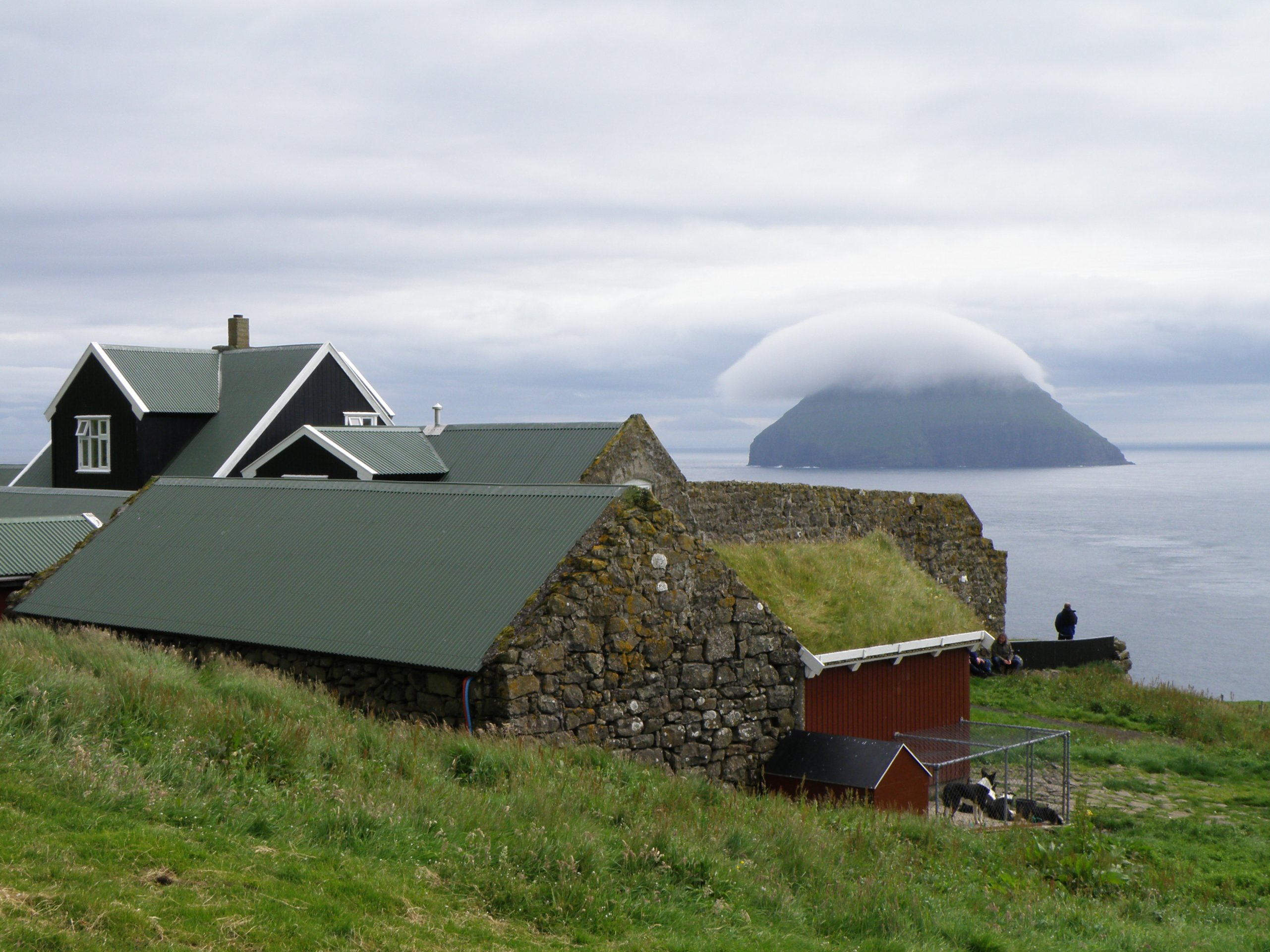
View towards unpopulated Lítla Dímun

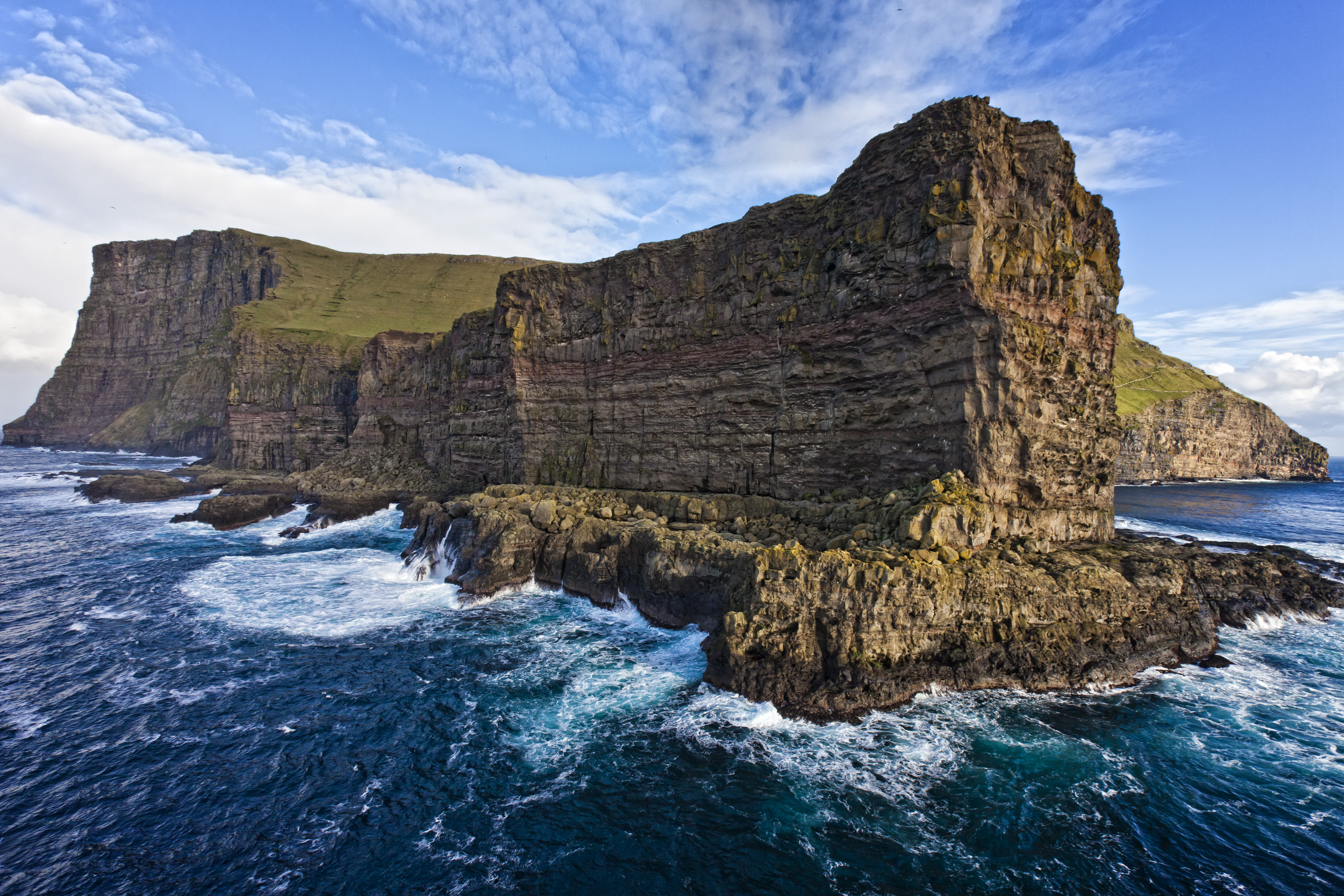
The Island's southern headland

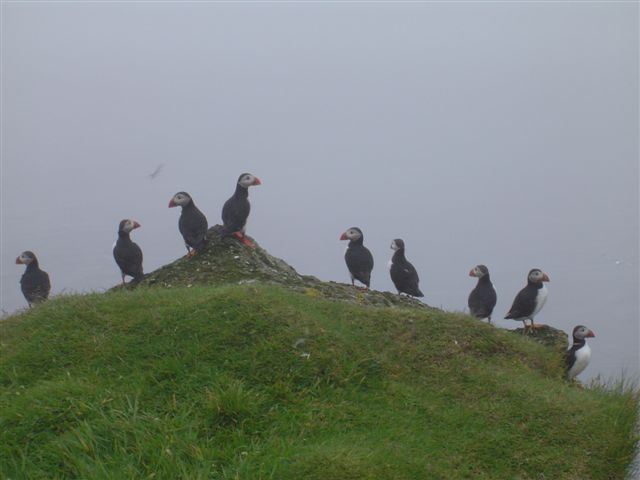
Puffins (Fratercula arctica) on Stóra Dímun
