= Beinir Sigmundsson =

Faroese chieftain

Beinir Sigmundsson (10th century – c. 970) was a chieftain in the Faroe Islands.

Beinir was the son of Sigmund the Elder. He was from Skúvoy. He ruled over half the archipelago along with his brother Brestir Sigmundsson. Together with Tóra he had the child Tóri Beinisson. Beinir and his brother were eventually murdered in 970 by rival chieftains Svínoyar-Bjarni and Havgrímur when they stayed at a farm on the island Stóra Dímun.

== Other Sources ==
- German Wikipedia article de:Beinir Sigmundsson
