= Tróndur í Gøtu =

Faroese Viking chieftain

- Born: c.945 Faroe Islands
- Died: 1035 (aged 89–90); Faroe Islands
- Parent(s): Torbjørn Gøtuskegg and Guðrún

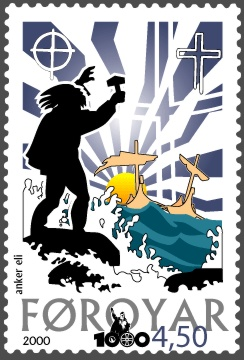
Tróndur í Gøtu raises the hammer of Thor against the arrival of Christianity in the Faroes, on a 2000 stamp

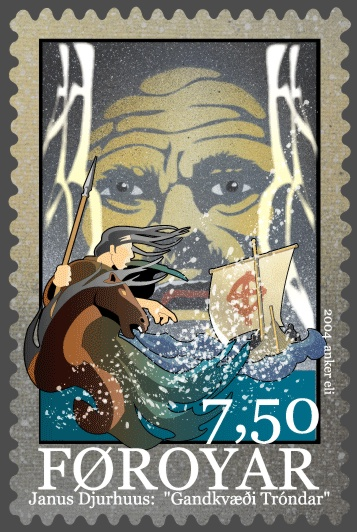
Tróndur í Gøtu pronounces his curse against Christianity and Sigmundur Brestisson; 2004 stamp illustrating Janus Djurhuus' poem

Tróndur í Gøtu (Icelandic: Þrándur í Götu, Old Norse Þrǫ́ndr í Gǫtu) (c. 945 – 1035) was a Viking Age chieftain in the Faroe Islands. He is remembered for his opposition to the importation of Christianity.

== Biography ==
Tróndur í Gøtu lived at his father's home in the village of Gøta on the island of Eysturoy. Initially Tróndur and his brother Thorlac drew lots to decide who should inherit the estate. After losing, Thorlac went to live in neighbouring islands with his wife. The siblings eventually lived together at Gøta with their children.

Tróndur opposed Christianization of the Faroes and pronounced a curse against the religion and rival chieftain Sigmundur Brestisson who was promulgating it. He and Brestisson are central figures in the Færeyinga saga, which tells the early history of the Faroe Islands and the coming of Christianity to the islands. This is also the subject of the poem "Gandkvæði Tróndar" by the Faroese poet Janus Djurhuus (1881–1948).

== Icelandic saying ==
Færeyinga saga was written in Iceland shortly after 1200. The saga is the oldest recorded source of the history of the Faroe Islands. It is commonly believed to have relied upon oral testimonies from the Faroe Islands. Tróndur í Gøtu became symbolic of resistance to royal power, with Icelanders now writing þrándur and götu in lower case.

The saying in the Icelandic language, vera einhverjum Þrándur í Götu (e. being someones Þrándur í Götu) or just að vera þrándur í götu (e. to be a þrándur í götu), means to be an obstacle to somebody.

== In popular culture ==
Faroese Tróndur í Gøtu still remains a popular folk character. The Faroese music band Týr wrote a song called "Tróndur í Gøtu" in honor of this famous Faroese warrior which was released in 2009 on the album By the Light of the Northern Star.
