= Brestir Sigmundsson =

Faroese chieftain

Brestir Sigmundsson (10th century-ca. 970) was a chieftain in the Faroe Islands.

Beinir was from Skúvoy. He was the son of Sigmund the Elder. Together with Cesilia, he had the son Sigmund Brestisson (961-1005) who was the first to bring Christianity to the islands. Jointly with his brother Beinir Sigmundsson, he ruled over half of the Faroe Islands. Brestir and his brother were eventually murdered by the rival chieftains Svínoyar-Bjarni and Havgrímur when they stayed at a farm on the island Stóra Dímun.

== Other Sources ==
- German Wikipedia article de:Brestir Sigmundsson
