= Sigmundur Brestisson =

Faroese Viking chieftain

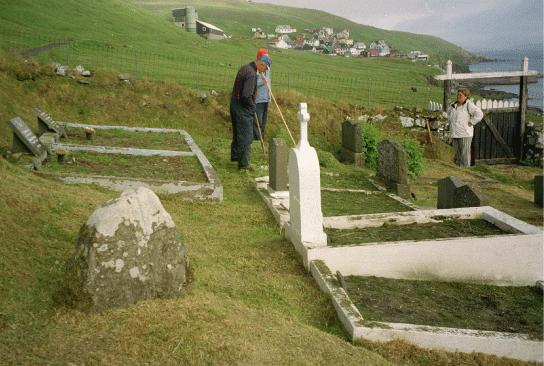
- The tomb of Sigmundur (on the left) in the graveyard of Skúvoy church
- Born: 961; Skúvoy, Faroe Islands
- Died: 1005 (aged 43–44); Sandvík, Faroe Islands
- Spouse: Turið Torkilsdóttir
- Children: Tóra, Tórálvur, Steingrímur, Brandur and Heri.
- Parent(s): Brestir Sigmundsson and Cæcilia.

Sigmundur Brestisson (961–1005) was a Faroese Viking chieftain, and was responsible for introducing Christianity to the Faroe Islands in 999, according to the Færeyinga saga. He is one of the main characters of the Færeyinga saga.

According to the Færeyinga saga, emigrants who left Norway to escape the tyranny of Harald I of Norway, settled in the islands about the beginning of the 9th century. Early in the 11th century, Sigmundur, whose family had flourished in the southern islands but had been almost exterminated by invaders from the north, was sent back to the Faroe Islands, whence he had escaped, to take possession of the islands for Olaf Tryggvason, king of Norway.

Sigmundur was the first Faroe Islander to convert to the Christian faith, bringing Christianity to the Faroes at the decree of Olaf Tryggvason. Initially Sigmundur sought to convert the islanders by reading the decree to the Alting in Tórshavn, but was nearly killed by the resulting angry mob. He then changed his tactics, went with armed men to the residence of the chieftain Tróndur í Gøtu and broke in his house by night. He offered him the choice between accepting Christianity or face beheading; he chose the former.

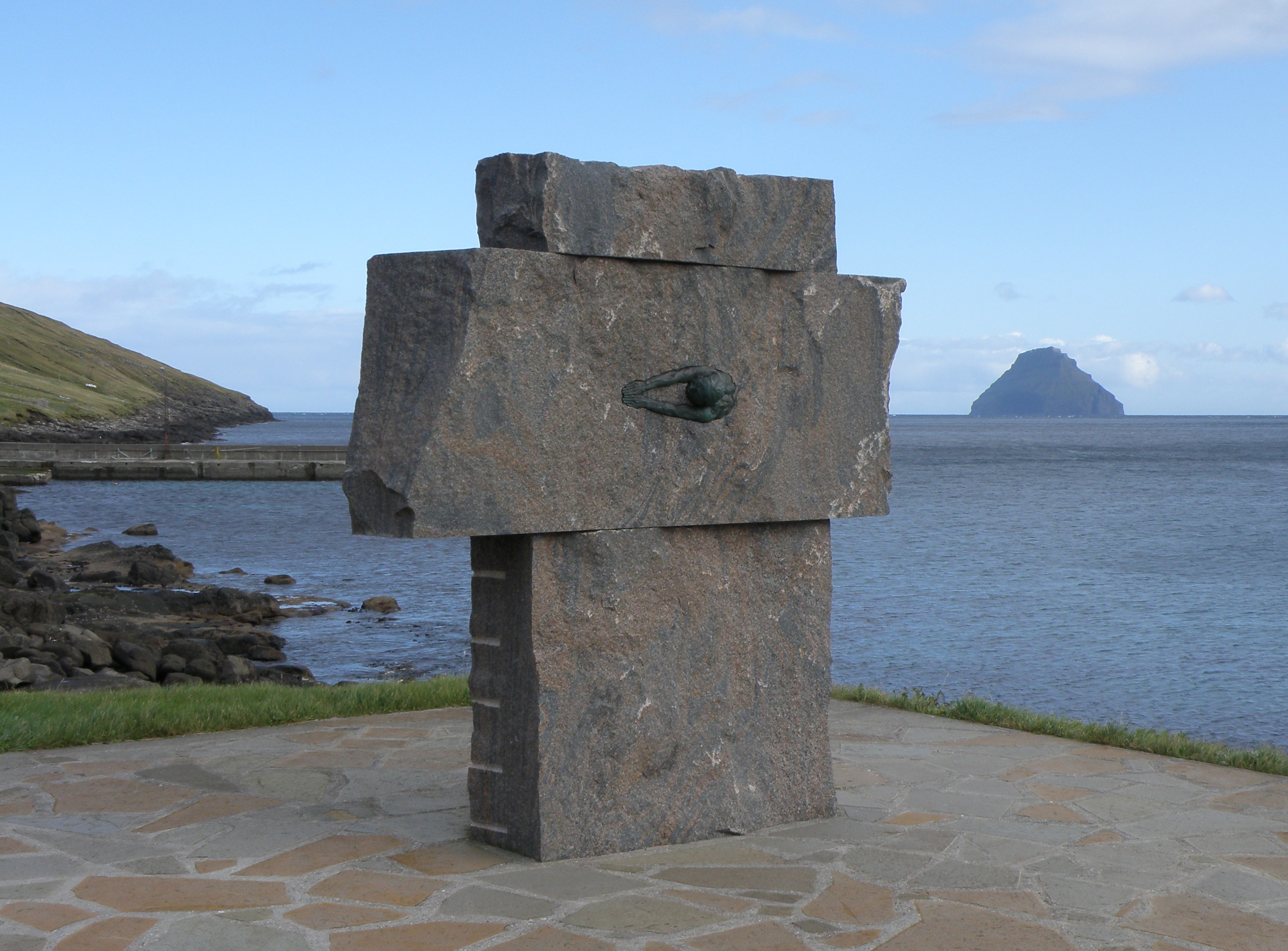
Monument in Sandvík, made by sculptor Hans Pauli Olsen in 2006 in memory of Sigmundur Brestisson.

Later, in 1005, Tróndur í Gøtu attacked Sigmundur by night at his yard in Skúvoy, whereupon he fled by swimming to Sandvík on Suðuroy. He reached land in Sigmundargjógv in Sandvík, but a farmer in the village killed the exhausted Sigmundur, and stole his precious golden arm ring.

According to tradition, his gravestone is located in the so-called Sigmundarsteinur in Skúvoy. It bears a carved cross and was part of the old church.
