= Faroese Music Awards =

Faroese music prize award ceremony

Faroese Music Awards (short form: FMA, in Faroese: Føroysku Tónlistavirðislønirnar) is a Faroese music prize award ceremony, which was established in 2014, after the former Faroese music prize Planet Awards was abolished when the producers Portal.fo were sold to new owners. Faroese Music Awards honours Faroese music, singers, musicians, composers etc. and is a cooperation between the Faroese national broadcasting company Kringvarp Føroya, the Nordic House in Tórshavn and others like the Miðlahúsið (Sosialurin and the internet portal In.fo).

The Faroese Music Awards were presented for the first time on 15 March 2014 in the Nordic House in Tórshavn, where 22 prizes were awarded. The Faroese Music Awards ceremony have been held every year since then, normally on a Saturday night in early March. The musical categories have been changed several times since the first FMA event.

== The Winners of FMA 2022 ==
The 2022 Faroese Music Awards ceremony took place on 2022 was the ninth year of this event. It was held in the Nordic House in Tórshavn on 12 March 2022.

Pop & Rock category

- Album of the Year: "Cazador de Ostras" – Teitur
- Song of the Year: "Hey Amanda" – Brimheim
- Female Singer of the Year: Brimheim
- Male Singer of the Year: Teitur
- Band of the Year: Brimheim

Open category

- Album/concert of the Year: "Fonetika" – BA Tónlist
- Composition of the Year: "Mourner’s Adagio" – Óli Jógvansson
- Singer/soloist of the Year: Ernst Remmel
- Ensemble/Choir of the Year: EKA

Other awards

- New Artist of the Year: Horrse
- Producer of the Year: Jens L. Thomsen
- Music Video of the Year: "Alt annað enn vanligt" – Maria Tórgarð
- Album Artwork of the Year: "Gonguteigatúnatos" – Kirstin Helgadóttir
- Song Lyric of the Year: "Sóleyan" – Elin Brimheim Heinesen
- Listeners' Choice Award: Ester Skála
- Music Export Award: Mahogni Music Publishing
- Lifetime Achievement Award: Martin Joensen

== The Winners of FMA 2021 ==
The 2021 Faroese Music Awards ceremony took place on 7 March 2021 in the form of a televised virtual event with nine pre-recorded musical performances.

- Lifetime achievement: Robert McBirnie
- Best female singer: Eivør
- Best male singer: Teitur
- Best album: ‘Modern Era’ – Teitur
- Best song: ‘Kanska’ – Einangran
- Best singer or solo artist: Jákup Lützen
- Best album or live performance: Kata – ‘1902’
- Best arrangement: ‘Bei’ Konsørn (video)
- Best new artist: Brimheim
- Best video: ‘Sleep on it’ – Eivør
- Best producer: Høgni Lisberg and James Thomas for ‘Within a man’
- Best lyric: ’Mánasegl’ – Marjun Syderbø Kjelnes
- Best album cover: Snorri Eldjarn Snorrason for ’Eivør’
- Public vote award: Hallur Joensen

== The Winners of FMA 2020 ==
Faroese Music Awards 2020 were held at the Nordic House in Tórshavn. Due to the COVID-19 outbreak, the award ceremony was held without a present audience, and music performances were recorded in advance. The winners at the FMA 2020 were as follows:

Pop/rock

- Female Artist of the Year: Jasmin
- Male Artist of the Year: Pól Arni Holm
- Song of the Year: Kostbar – Ingi Poulsen
- Album of the Year: I Know It's Over – Jasmin
- Band or Artist of the Year: Joe & The Shitboys

Open Category

- Singer or solo performer of the Year: Janus Rasmussen
- Band or Choir of the Year: Tórshavnar Big Band
- Album or Concert of the Year: Klingra – Afenginn
- Composition of the Year: Songs of solitude and night – Sunleif Rasmussen
- New Name of the Year: Marius DC
- Music Video of the Year: Fremmed – The River (by Atli Brix Kamban)
- Producer of the Year: Janus Rasmussen
- Lyrics of the Year: Klingra – Afenginn
- Album Cover of the Year: Annika Arge Gregoriussen (Catch – Plúmm)
- Listener Award: Ingi Poulsen
- Special Award: Kristian Blak

== The Winners of FMA 2018 ==
The 2018 FMA show was co-hosted by Rolant Waag Dam and Kristian Blak in the Nordic House.

- Best Female singer: Kristina Baerendsen
- Best New Artist: Silvurdronger
- Best Album: Ingalvur av Reyni
- Best Band: Alda Magna
- Best Producer: Hans Poulson
- Best Album Cover: Kapnas spælir Blak

== The Winners of FMA 2017 ==
The 2017 FMA show was held in the Nordic House on 11 March 2017.

- Best Song: "Alright" by Danny and The Veetos
- Best Female singer: Lena Anderssen
- Best Male singer: Heiðrik á Heygum
- Best Singer/soloist: Eivør Pálsdóttir
- Best newcomer: Konni Kass
- Best Artist/Band: Danny and The Veetos
- Best Artist/Group: ORKA
- Best Composition: "Symphony no. 2 – The Earth Anew" – Sunleif Rasmussen
- Best Producer: Niclas Johannesen, for producing Eagle In The Sky with Lena Anderssen
- Best Album: Eagle In The Sky – Lena Anderssen
- Best Album/Concert: At The Heart Of A Selkie – Eivør Pálsdóttir and DR Big Band
- Best Song lyrics: "Verð mín", written by Marjun Syderbø Kjælnæs, performed by Eivør Pálsdóttir on At The Heart Of A Selkie.
- Best Music video: "Einaferð var tað eg", GUT Productions – Director: Búi Dam.

== The Winners of FMA 2016 ==
- Best Female Singer: Eivør Pálsdóttir
- Best Individual singer: Eivør Pálsdóttir
- Best Composition: "Territorial Songs" by Sunleif Rasmussen
- Best CD: Territorial Songs by Sunleif Rasmussen
- Best Album: Double releases Slør and Bridges by Eivør Pálsdóttir
- Best Album Artwork: Slør with Eivør Pálsdóttir

== Nominations in 2016 ==
=== Nominations across the categories ===
==== Best producer of the year ====
- Tróndur Bogason
- Bunkarin
- Kaj Johannesen
- Jákup Zachariassen
- Jens L. Thomsen

==== Best new artist or band of the year ====
- Alvi Joensen
- Elinborg Pálsdóttir
- Hamradun
- Hulda
- Jógvan Joensen
- Kátir Kallar
- Mahanna
- Punjab
- Ragnar Finsson

==== Best music video of the year ====
- Hamferð - Deyðir varðar
- Byrta - Aftur og aftur
- Byrta - Andvekur
- Brynjolfur - Chain glass
- Ranchus – Clog

=== Nominations of Folk, Country and Blues ===
==== Best female or male singer of the year ====
- Annika Hoydal
- Árni Johannesen
- Hallur Joensen
- Hanus G. Johansen
- Sofus Hansen

==== Best band/artist of the year ====
- Annika Hoydal
- Froðbiar Sóknar Bluesorkestur
- Hallur Joensen
- Hanus G. & Cantabile
- Punjab

==== Best album of the year ====
- Endurljós – Annika Hoydal
- Heitur kossur – Hanus G. & Cantabile
- If the Ocean was Wine – Froðbiar Sóknar Blues Orkestur
- Lívið er ein lítil løta – Hallur Joensen
- The Flying Elephant – Punjab

==== Best song of the year ====
- "Hairy Woman" – Punjab
- "Saknur" - Hanus G. & Cantabile
- "Kári Kálvalíð" – Hallur Joensen
- "Lívið er ein lítil løta" – Hallur Joensen
- "Run to You" – Punjab

== FMA 2015 ==
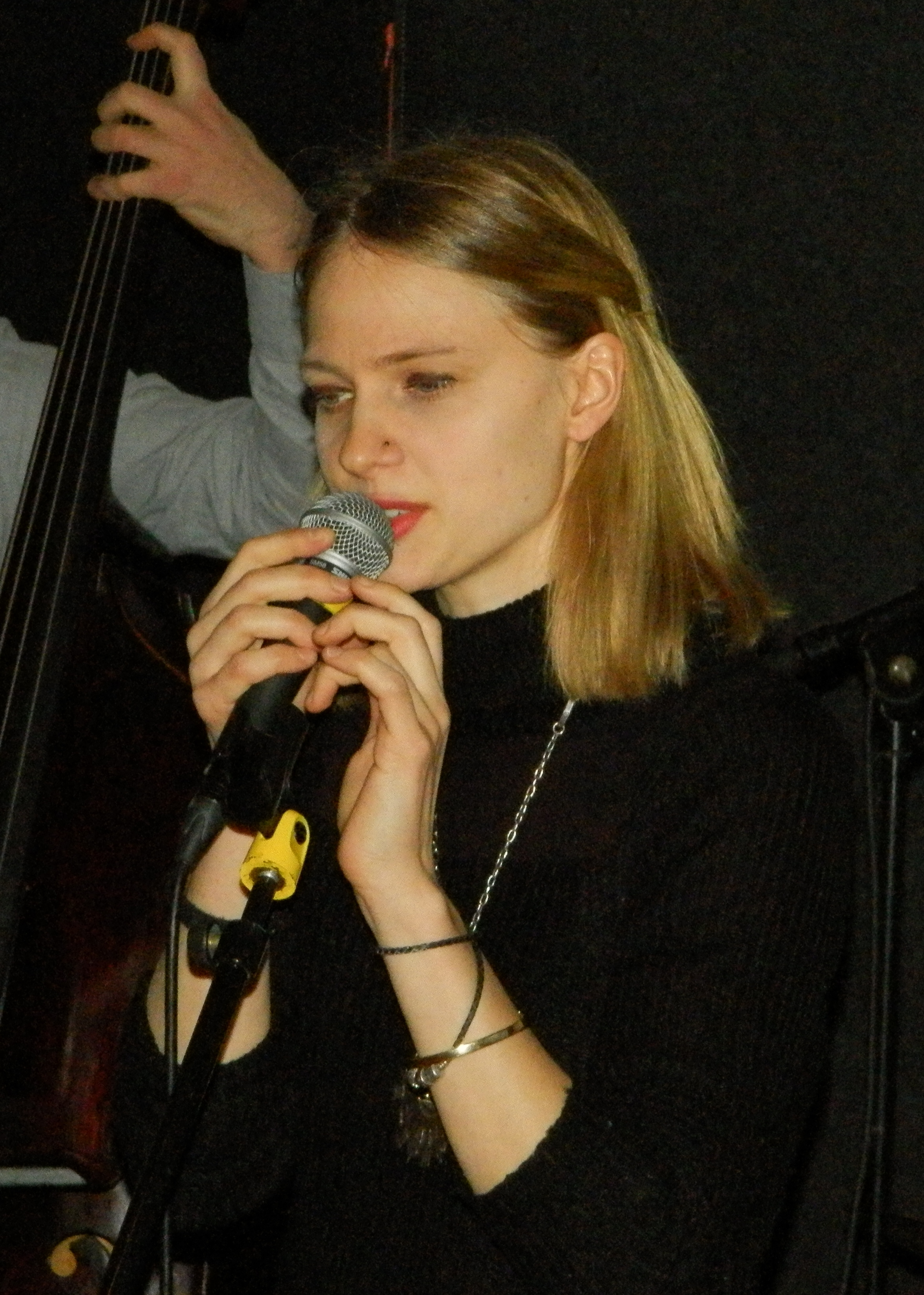
Greta Svabo Bech won the prize Female singer of the year and the song "Myrkablátt", which she sings and composed was awarded with the prize Song of the year in the Pop/Rock category.

FMA 2015 was held in the Nordic House in Tórshavn on 14 March 2015.

The following artists performed:

- Greta Svabo Bech
- Yggdrasil
- Xperiment
- Vágaverk
- Týr
- Tollarar Og Syndarar
- Systrar
- Signar í Homrum
- Sakaris
- Quarter To Three
- Hallelujah Sofus
- Dánjal á Neystabø
- AVE
- Alvi Joensen

== The Winners of FMA 2015 ==
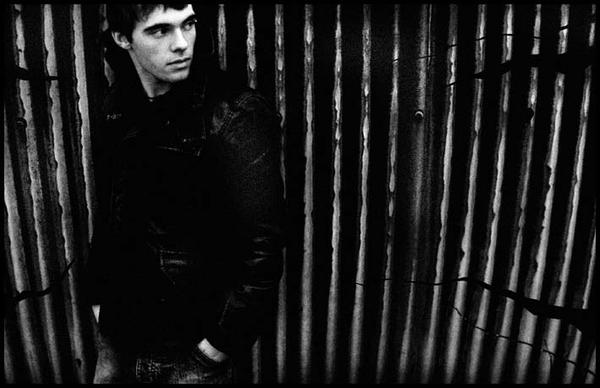
Høgni Lisberg (HOGNI) won the prize Album of the year in the category Pop/Rock, he won for the album Call for a Revolution. Photo: Bárður Eklund.

=== Pop/Rock category ===
- Male singer of the year: Benjamin Petersen.
- Female singer of the year: Greta Svabo Bech.
- Song of the year: Myrkablátt (also known as: Einsamallast í Føroyum), Greta Svabo Bech sings and composed. Elin á Rógvi wrote the text. The song was a part of the radio-advent calendar Nivinaja which Elin á Rógvi wrote.
- Album of the year: Call for a Revolution with HOGNI (Høgni Lisberg)
- Band or artist of the year: AVE

=== Open category ===
- Best singer or artist of the year: Dávur Juul Magnussen.
- Best band or choir of the year: Yggdrasil
- Best musical composition of the year: Nordisk messe by Sunleif Rasmussen for mixed choir and symphony orchestra.
- Best album or concert of the year: Høvdingar hittast, album by the British composer Gavin Bryars, published in 2014, performed in the Nordic House in Tórshavn in 2011, Eivør Pálsdóttir and Rúni Brattaberg sang at the concert. The music was played by Aldubáran and Eystanljóð.

== FMA 2014 ==
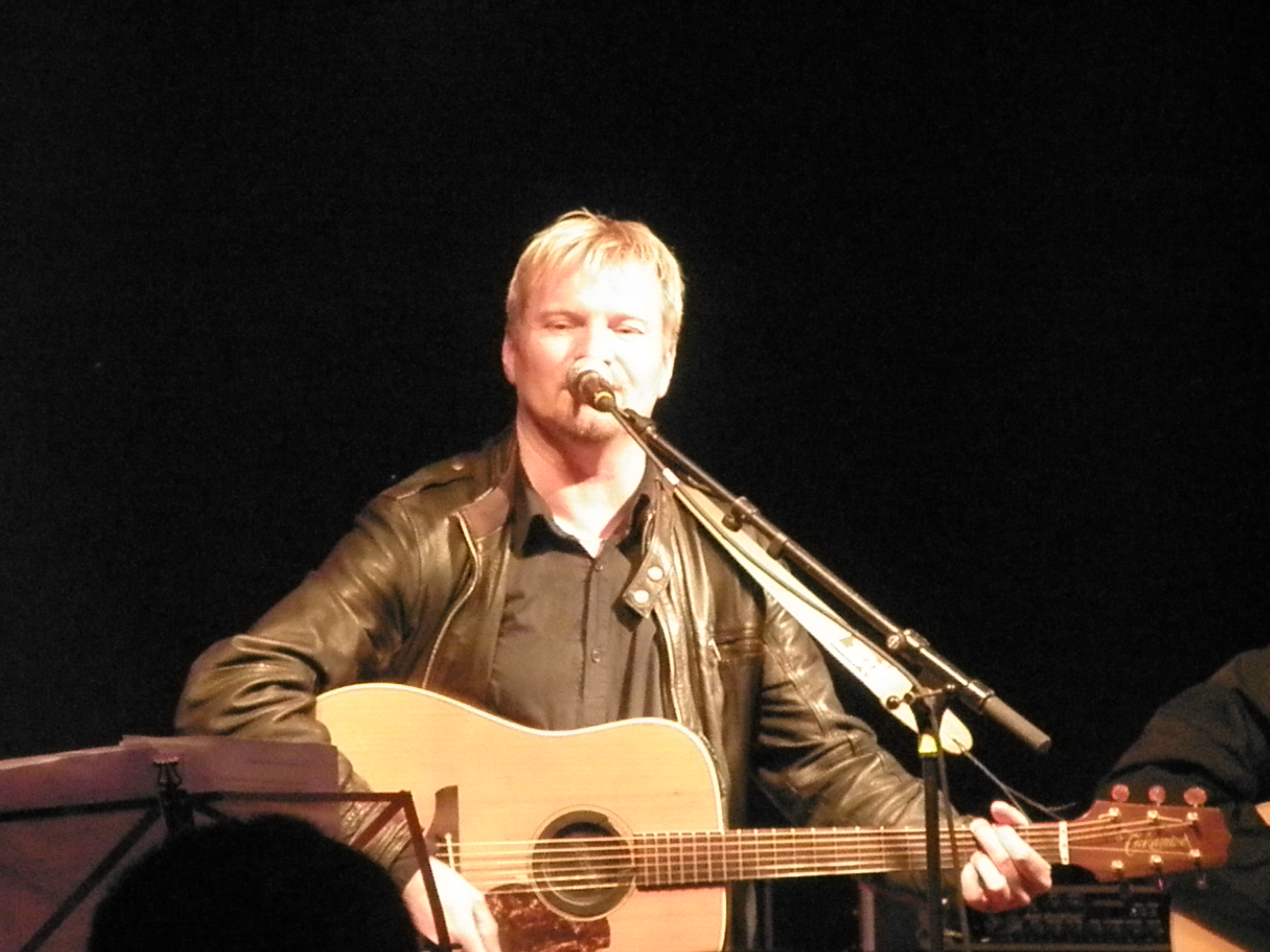
Hallur Joensen won the prize Best male singer in the pop category.

The show was broadcast on the national Faroese radio live. The hosts were Barbara Holm and Eyðfinn Jensen. There were also performances by various Faroese artists and bands:

- Jóannes Andreasen
- Jens Marni Hansen
- Marius Ziska
- The Absent Silver King
- Kári Sverrisson
- Hallur Joensen & Kristina Bærendsen
- Kamarkórið
- Leila av Reyni
- Allan Tausen
- Reduce to Ash
- LoverLover
- Døgg Nónsgjógv
- Cantabile
- Hanus G. Johansen

== The winners of FMA 2014 ==
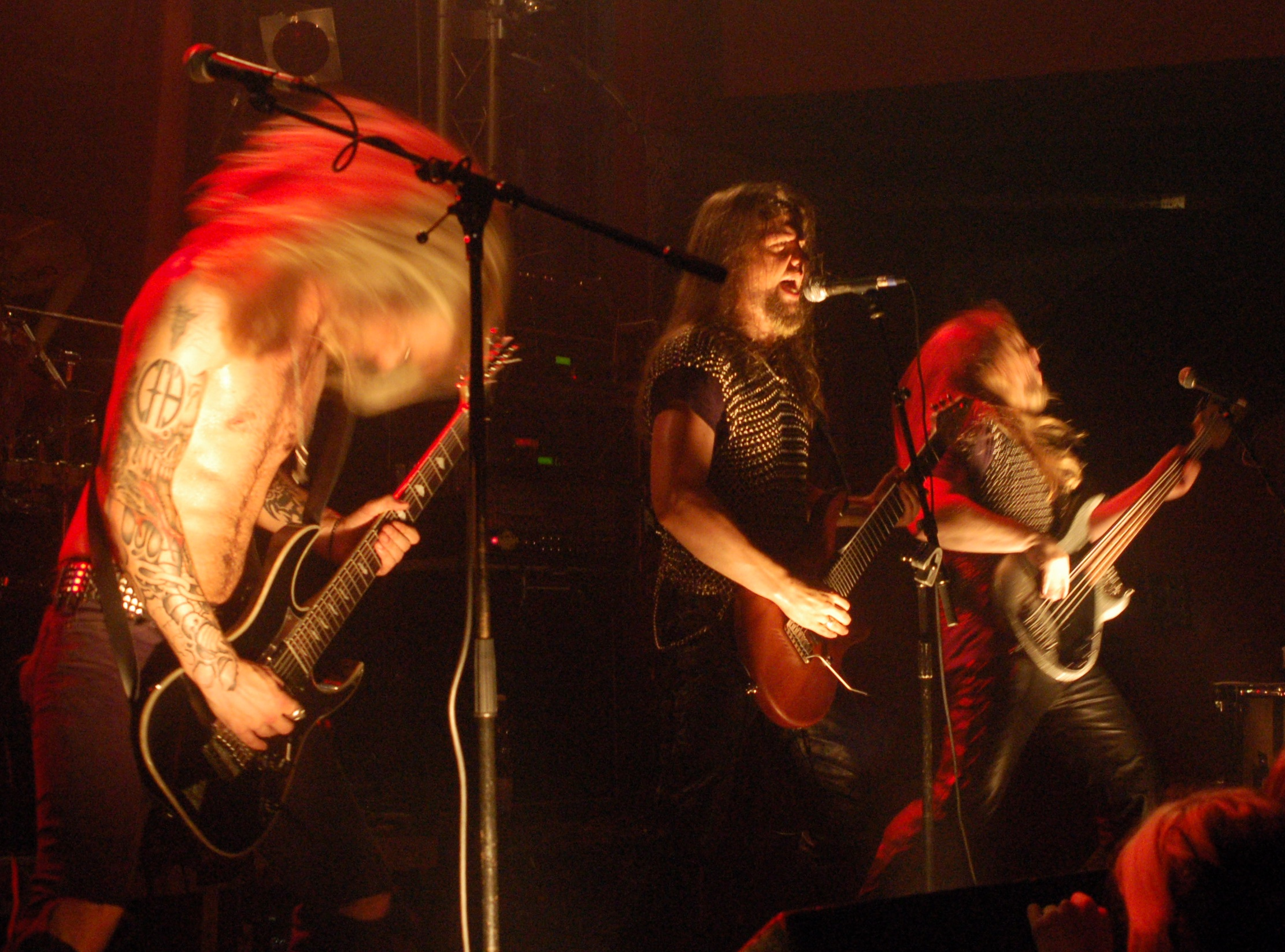
Týr won the prize as Best band of the year in the category Rock/Metal, Jazz, Blues og Folk

=== Rock/Metal, Jazz, Blues and Folk category ===
- Best band of the year: Týr
- Best singer of the year: Jón Aldará (lead singer in Hamferð)
- Best album of the year: Týr
- Best song of the year: Tokan – Marius and Svavar Knútur

=== Open category ===
- Best album of the year: Eivør for Lítla Skrímsl
- Best artist/band: The Quartet of Betesda (choir)
- Best melody: Eivør for Lurta nú

=== Pop category ===
- Best male singer of the year: Hallur Joensen
- Best female singer of the year: Greta Svabo Bech
- Best song of the year: Døgg Nónsgjógv for the song Tú tók mína hond
- Best album of the year: Byrta
- Best band/artist of the year: Byrta
- Best live band of the year: Swangah

=== Other prizes ===
- Best new band of the year: Byrta
- Best producer of the year: Baroli Music
- Best music video of the year: Greta Svabo Bech for Broken Bones, director: Jamie Quantrill
- FMA prize of honour: Simme
- Best new thinker of the year: HOYMA (home concerts in Eysturoy) with Jón Tyril and others
- Best text of the year: Jóanes Nielsen and Kári Sverrisson for the song Lívið er júst sum tað er (poem by Jóanes Nielsen), which Kári Sverrisson has composed and sung
- Best album cover of the year: Týr's Valkyrja

== Nominations 2014 ==
=== Rock/Metal, Jazz, Blues and Folk category ===
==== Best singer or artist of the year ====
- Kári Sverrisson
- Jón Aldará
- Høgni Lisberg

==== Best band or artist of the year ====
- Týr
- Hamferð
- Kári Sverrisson & Bendar Spónir

==== Best album of the year ====
- Valkyrja – Týr
- Evst – Hamferð
- Nøkur fá fet aftrat – Kári Sverrisson & Bendar Spónir

==== Best song of the year ====
- "Stóra lívmóðurin" – Kári Sverrisson & Bendar Spónir
- "Tokan" – Marius and Svavar Knútur
- "Nation" – Týr

=== Open category ===
==== Best artist or band of the year ====
- Eivør
- Bendar Spónir
- Kvartettin í Betesda

==== Best album of the year ====
- Motion/Emotion – Sunleif Rasmussen
- Skrímslið, lítla systir mín - Eivør
- Hvussu bendir man spónir - Bendar Spónir

==== Best melody/værk ====
- Lurta nú – Eivør
- Motion/Emotion – Sunleif Rasmussen
- Hin nýggi sangurin – Bendar Spónir

=== Pop category ===
==== Best male singer of the year ====
- Teitur
- Høgni Reistrup
- Knút
- Jens Marni
- Hallur Joensen

==== Best female singer of the year ====
- Greta Svabo Bech
- Guðrið Hansdóttir
- Guðrun Pætursdóttir Háberg
- Døgg Nónsgjógv
- Laila Carlsen

==== Best album of the year ====
- Byrta – Byrta
- Story Music – Teitur
- Undirgangstónar – Swangah
- Áðrenn vit hvørva – Høgni Reistrup
- With Stars & Legends – Hallur Joensen

==== Best song of the year ====
- "Loyndarmál" – Byrta
- "Tú tók mína hond" – Døgg Nónsgjógv
- "Shut Up & Sing" – Greta Svabo Bech
- "Rock And Roll Band" – Teitur
- "Heyah" – Allan Tausen

==== Best band/artist of the year ====
- Byrta
- Teitur
- Greta Svabo Bech
- Høgni Reistrup
- Swangah

=== Best upcoming band/artist ===
- Byrta
- Døgg Nónsgjógv
- Greta Svabo Bech
- The Absent Silver King
- LoverLover
- Flamma
- Allan Tausen
- Laila av Reyni
- Jákup Lützen

=== Best music video of the year ===
- All in – Tú, : Polar Films Entertainment
- Lena Anderssen – The Fighter, director: Lene Drachmann
- Byrta – Norðlýsið, director: Heiðrik á Heygum
- Eivør – True Love, director: Heiðrik á Heygum
- Greta Svabo Bech – Broken Bones, director: Jamie Quantrill
