= G! Festival =

Faroese musical festival

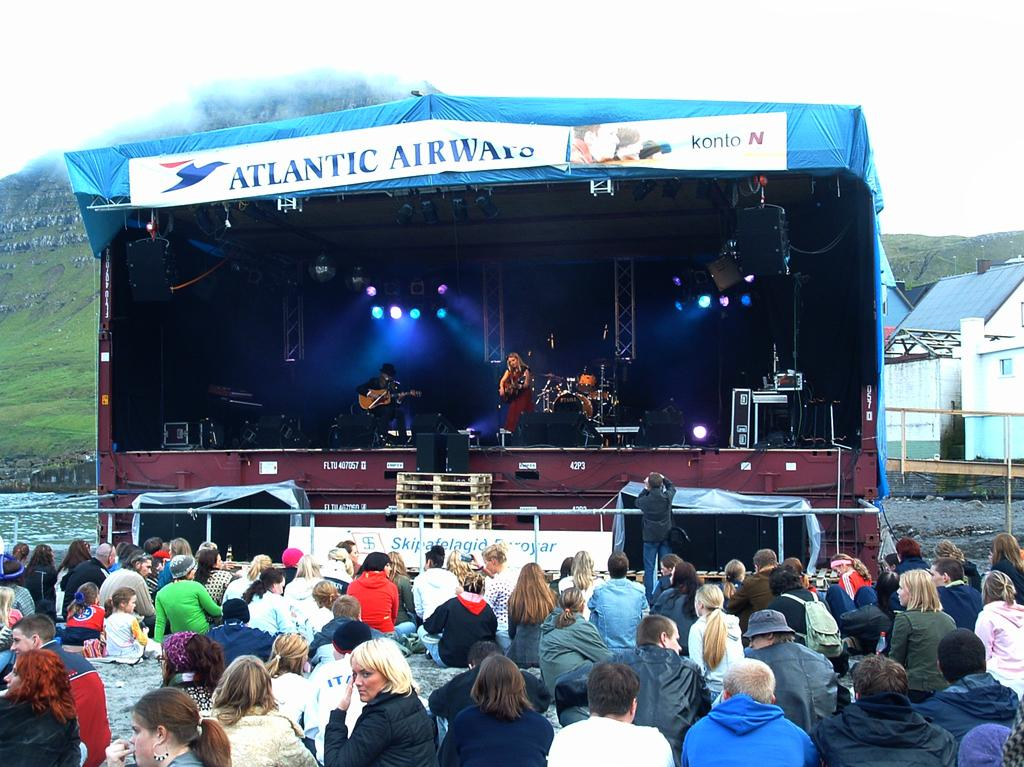
- Eivør performing with Bill Bourne at the G! Festival 2004
- Genre: Alternative rock, Punk, Rock, Pop, Metal, Christian music, World music
- Dates: Three days, mid or late in July
- Locations: Syðrugøta, Faroe Islands
- Years active: 2002 - present

The G! Festival (commonly known as G!, in Faroese also called G! Festivalur or G! Festivalurin) is a Faroese musical festival, held annually at the seaside village Syðrugøta in Eysturoy in mid or late July, but always before Ólavsøka. It is one of the two largest music festivals on the Faroe Islands, the other being Summarfestivalurin. It was founded by Sólarn Solmunde and musician Jón Tyril, both locals. Jón is also the present chairman of the festival.

== History ==
The G! Festival was the first real outdoor music festival ever held on the Faroe Islands. Around 1000 people bought tickets to the first festival in 2002, and ticket sales have grown steadily ever since. In 2005 the G! Festival arrangers announced the festival sold out, with ticket sales of 6000. An estimated 2000 to 4000 people partook in the music festival from outside the festival area, mainly in boats on the sea or in the hills and roads surrounding the area. It is believed that a fifth of the entire population of the Faroe Islands partook in the 2005 festival.

In 2005 Jón Tyril received the M.A. Jacobsen Distinguished Prize for Cultural Achievement for his work with G! Festival.

G! Festival cooperates annually with Iceland Airwaves. Each year, a group from the G! roster will perform at Airwaves and vice versa.

== Specific years ==
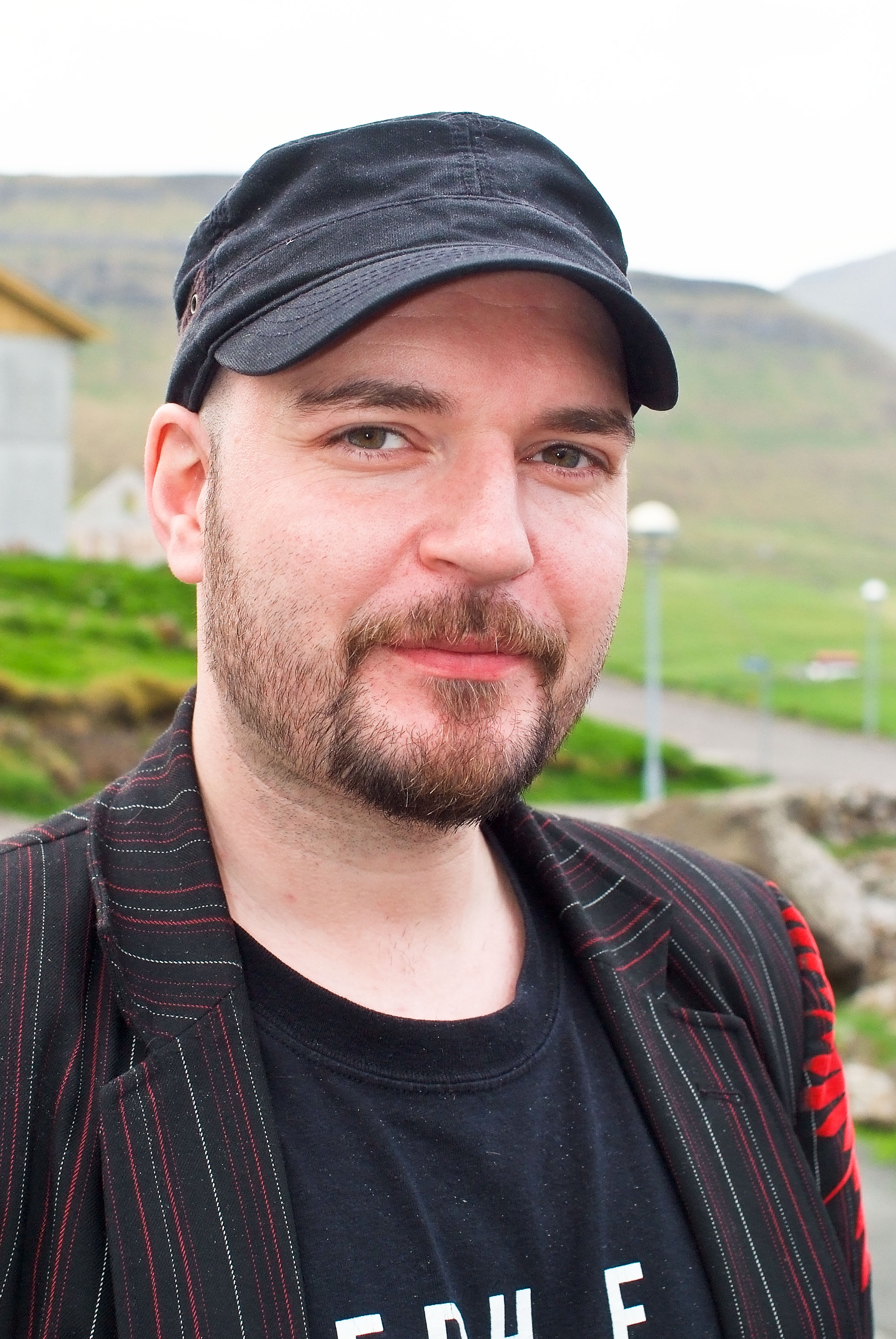
Jon Tyril, co-founder and chairman

=== 2003 ===
The 2003 festival featured artists such as Bomfunk MC’s (FI), Úlpa (IS), Xploding Plastix (NO), Glorybox (DK), Clickhaze (FO).

=== 2004 ===
The 2004 festival featured artists such as Kashmir (DK), Lisa Ekdahl (SE), Russ Taff (US), Temple of Sound (UK), Darude (FI), Gåte (NO).

=== 2005 ===
The 2005 festival featured artists such as Nephew (DK), Blue Foundation (DK), Beats and Styles (FI), Glenn Kaiser (US), Hjálmar (IS), Afenginn (DK), Europe (SE), Eivør Pálsdóttir (FO), Teitur (FO).

=== 2006 ===
The 2006 festival featured artists such as Mugison (IS), Animal Alpha (NO), Beth Hart (US), Kaizers Orchestra (NO), Outlandish (DK), Infernal (DK), Eivør Pálsdóttir (FO), Teitur (FO).

=== 2007 ===
The 2007 festival featured artists such as Natasha Bedingfield (UK), Guillemots (UK), Young Dubliners (US), The Dixie Hummingbirds (US), Nephew (DK), Hatesphere (DK), Serena Maneesh (NO), Adjágas (NO), Polkaholix (DE), Pétur Ben (IS), Dr. Spock (IS), Eivør Pálsdóttir (FO), Teitur Lassen (FO), Lena Anderssen (FO), Boys In A Band (FO), Sic (FO) Metronomy (UK)

=== 2009 ===
The 2009 festival featured artists such as Spleen United (DK), Mr Flash (FR), Familjen (SE), Katzenjammer (NO), Nathan James (US), Veto (DK), The Haunted (SE), Valravn (FO/DK), Boys In A Band (FO), Annika Hoydal (FO), Teitur Lassen (FO), Heiðrik á Heygum (FO), Bet Your Are William (FO), Lena Anderssen (FO), Dánjal á Neystabø (FO), Frændur (FO), Tinganest (FO).

=== 2010 ===
The 2010 festival featured artists such as Arch Enemy (SE), Moto Boy (SE), FM Belfast (IS), Eivør Pálsdóttir (FO), Nephew (DK), Lucy Love (DK), Týr (FO) and The Ghost (FO).

=== 2011 ===
The 2011 festival featured artists such as Travis (UK), The Tennessee Mafia Jug Band (US), Annemarie Zimakoff (DK), Mugison (IS), Petur Pólson (FO), Orka (FO), Andy Irvine (IRE), Guðrið Hansdóttir (FO), Fallulah (DK), Skálmöld (IS), Hamferð (FO), Guðrun & Bartal (FO), Blind Boys of Alabama (US), Movits! (SE), Meshuggah (SE), Týr (FO), Sic (band)(FO), Nive Nielsen and the Deer Children (GR) and more.

=== 2012 ===
The 2012 festival featured artists such as Kapten Röd (SE), Raske Penge (DK), Retro Stefson (IS), Hogni (FO), Eivør Pálsdóttir (FO), Amsterdam Klezmer Band (NL) 200 (FO), Teitur Lassen (FO), Rosa Lux (DK), Nanook (GL) Hamferð (FO) Guðrið Hansdóttir (FO), JPFT Soundsystem (DK), Benjamin (FO), Brynjolfur (FO), Gipsy Train (FO), Villu Veski (EE), Momentum (IS), SAKARIS (FO), Marius Ziska (FO), Frændur (FO), Knút (FO), Kaj Klein (FO), KGB (IS), Lív Næs (FO), Kiasmos (FO/IS) and more.

=== 2013 ===
The 2013 G!festival featured artists such as Nephew (DK), Karin Park (SE), Ásgeir Trausti (IS), Reptile Youth (DK), Alina Devecerski (SE), Laid Back (DK), Den Sorte Skole (DK), Eivør Pálsdóttir (FO), Hamferð (FO), Byrta (FO), 200 (FO), Teitur Lassen (FO), Marius Ziska (FO), Benjamin (FO), Angist (IS), Earth Divide (FO), Hogni (FO), Boys In A Band (FO), Kári Sverrisson w/ Bendar Spónir (FO), Yggdrasil (FO), Brynjolfur (FO), LV & Okmalumkoolkat (US/SA), MRC Riddims (US), Fredo (UK), Himmerland (DK), Sun Glitters (LX), Lula Rose (DE), Afenginn (DK) and more.

=== 2014 ===
The 2014 G!festival featured artists including Sister Sledge (US), Moddi (NO), Týr (FO), Kaleo (IS), Lydmor (DK) and more.

=== 2015 ===
The 2015 G!festival featured artists including Dizzy Mizz Lizzy (DK), Hackney Colliery Band (UK), At the Gates (SE), Jamie Woon (UK) and more.

=== 2016 ===
The 2016 G!festival featured artists including Steve'n'Seagulls (FI), SBCR AKA The Bloody Beetroots DJ SET (IT), Dub Phizix & Strategy (UK), Songhoy Blues (ML), Lucy Rose (UK), Hudson Taylor (IE) and Gabrielle Aplin (UK), Hot 8 Brass Band (US), Phlake (DK), Federspiel (AT), Annika Hoydal (FO) and more.

=== 2017 ===
The 2017 G!festival featured artists including Toto (US), MØ (DK), Kristoffer Kristofferson (US), Bilderbuch (AT), Suspekt (DK), Alphaville (DE), Bombino (NE), Monophonics (US), Fil Bo Riva (IT), Baskery (SE), Reykjavíkurdætur (IS), Brothers Moving (DK), Desert Mountain Tribe (UK), Teitur (FO), Konni Kass (FO), 200 (FO), Orka (FO) Elinborg (FO), Son of Fortune (FO), Frederik Elsner (GL) and more.

=== 2018 ===
The 2018 G!festival featured artists including Rag'n'Bone Man (UK), Ben Gibbard (US), Harlem Gospel Choir (US), Faithless DJ SET (UK), Scarlet Pleasure (DK), Ba Cissoko (GN), Brothers Moving (DK), Eivør (FO), Teitur (FO), Hamferð (FO), Úlfur Úlfur (IS), Marius Ziska (FO), Son of Fortune (FO), Nelson Can (DK), Hogni (FO), and more.

=== 2019 ===
The 2019 G!festival featured artists including Fatboy Slim (UK), Vok (IS), Eivør (FO), Jennifer Cardini DJ SET (FR), Phlake (DK), Ferris & Sylvester (UK), Noah Carter (DK), Greta Svabo Bech (FO), Týr (FO), Marius Ziska (FO), Emmsje Gauti (IS), Marius Ziska (FO), Joe & The Shitboys (FO), Simon Littauer (DK), Anna Lann (LV) and more.

=== 2020 ===
The 2020 G!festival featured artists including Saving Grace feat. Robert Plant & Suzi Dian (UK), Specktors (DK), Tessa (DK), Joe & The Shitboys (FO), Eivør (FO), Marius DC (FO) and more. Cancelled because of COVID-19.

=== 2021 ===
The 2021 G!festival featured artists including Aurora (NO), When Saints Go Machine (DK), Tessa (DK), Eivør (FO), Boy Pablo (NO), Skatebård (NO), Jóipé & Króli (IS), Gaye Su Akyol (TR), Swangah (FO), Calby (DK), Hamferð (FO), La Fleur (SE), Høgni (FO), Lena Anderssen (FO), Janus Rasmussen (FO), Emil Lange (DK), Huun-Huur-Tu (RU), Brimheim (FO), Greta (DK), Son Of Fortune (FO), LaLaLar (TR), The Holy (FI), Antti Paalanen (FI), Yasmyn (EE) and many more. Cancelled because of COVID-19.

=== 2022 ===
The 2022 G!festival featured artists including José González (SE), Tessa (DK), Eivør (FO), Ásgeir (IS), Teitur (FO), Daði Freyr (IS), Carlene Carter (US), The Jillionaire (TT), Priya Ragu (CH), Guðrið Hansdóttir (FO), Marius Ziska (FO), TERR (BR), Brynjolfur (FO), Suchi (NO), Pom Poko (NO), SONS (BE), Lucky Lo (DK/SE), Tarante Groove Machine (ISR), and many more.

=== 2023 ===
The 2023 G!festival featured artists including Eivør (FO), Sturle Dagsland NO, SOOLKING (DZ), When Saints Go Machines DK, Saint Levant (PS/FR), Yann Tiersen (FR), and more.
