= Si Vis Pacem, Para Bellum (disambiguation) =

Si vis pacem, para bellum is a Latin phrase.

Si Vis Pacem, Para Bellum may also refer to:

- Si Vis Pacem, Para Bellum, a 2010 album by Sic
- Si Vis Pacem, Para Bellum (album), a 2020 album by Seether
- "Si Vis Pacem, Para Bellum" (Star Trek: Discovery), a 2017 television episode
