= Elinborg =

- Elinborg 2026

Background information
- Born: Elinborg Pálsdóttir; 4 December 1996 (age 29); Syðrugøta, Faroe Islands
- Occupation: Singer-songwriter
- Website: elinborgmusic.com

Elinborg Pálsdóttir (born 4 December 1996), known mononymously as Elinborg, is a Faroese singer-songwriter. Born and raised in the small town of Syðrugøta, she released her first EP album in 2015. Her musical output spans several genres, such as electronic, folk, world, and country.

She's Eivør Pálsdóttir's younger sister.

== Career ==
In August 2015, she released her first album of four songs, written by herself in Faroese. The album, titled Spor, was produced by Høgni Lisberg. In the same year, she performed at the G! Festival.

Ever since Elinborg released her first album, she has been a regular on the live circuit around the Faroe Islands. In 2016, she performed at the summer festival Ólavsøka and Voxbotn, and won Best Live Act of The Year, at the Faroese Music Awards (FMA).

In 2017, she released her second album, Landið sum eingin sær, co-produced by Høgni Lisberg, Allan Tausen and Hans Marius Ziska.

In May 2018, she released her single Brimið, which was featured in the Norwegian Netflix TV series Ragnarok.

In 2022, she graduated from The Rhythmic Music Conservatory with the Musician bachelor degree. She collaborated with her sister Eivør, Tróndur Bogason, Hallur Jonson and the Norwegian producer, drummer, Trond Bersu to produce her third album, Vera. The album’s name translates from Faroese into “being”, and includes 5 songs written by herself in her native language. Elinborg showcased the tracks of Vera during autumn, as she joined her sister Eivør's 2022 European tour.

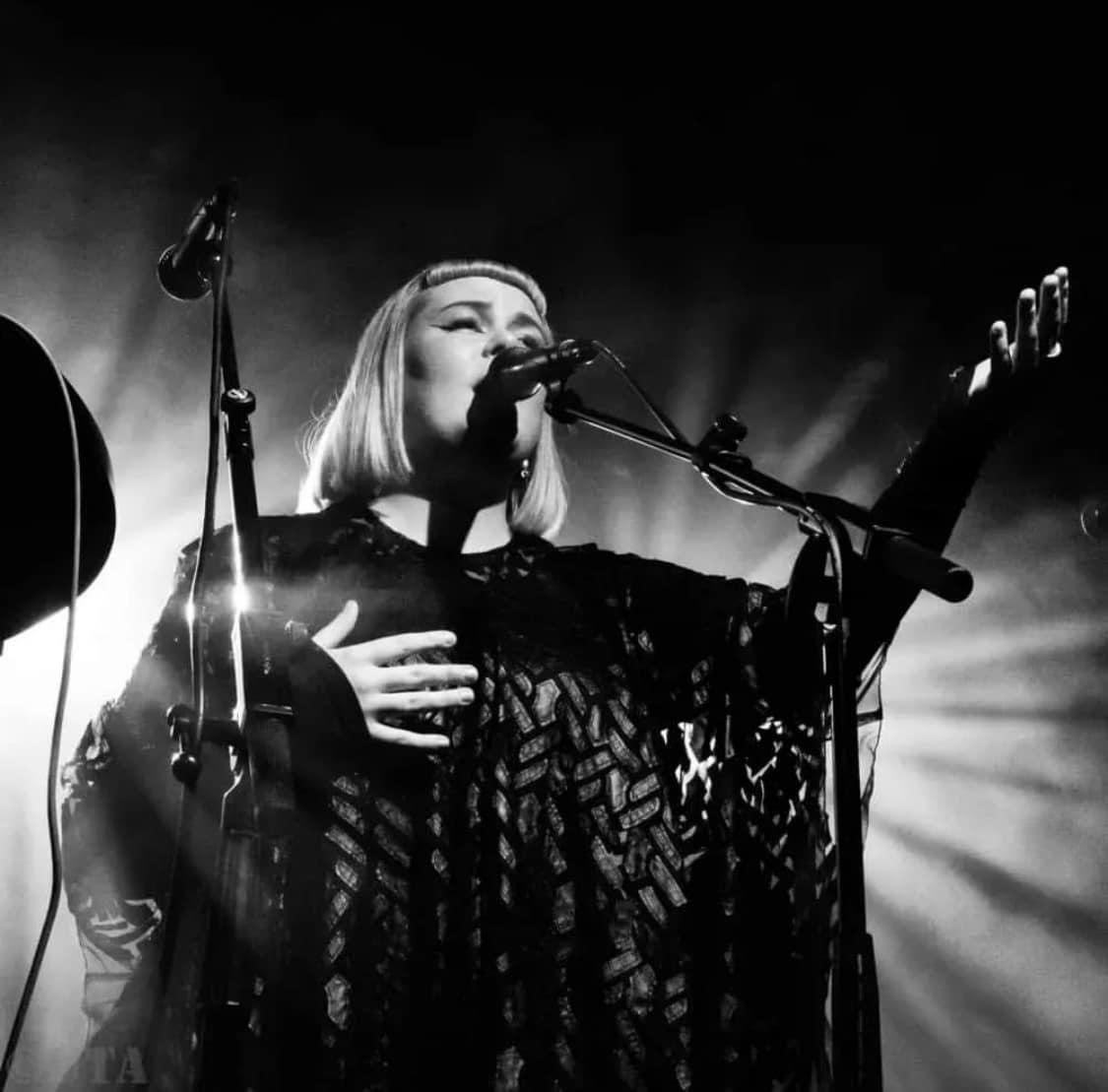
Elinborg singing in a concert

In June 2023, Elinborg released her single "Í verju tíni", which translates into "In your protection". The song is about love; how it can be beautiful and safe, but also scary.
