= Elinborg (given name) =

Elinborg is a given name. Notable people with the name include:

- Elínborg Halldórsdóttir (born 1962), Icelandic rock musician
- Elinborg Lützen (1919–1995), Faroese graphic designer
- Elinborg Pálsdóttir (born 1996), Faroese singer-songwriter
