= Syðrugøta =

- Village
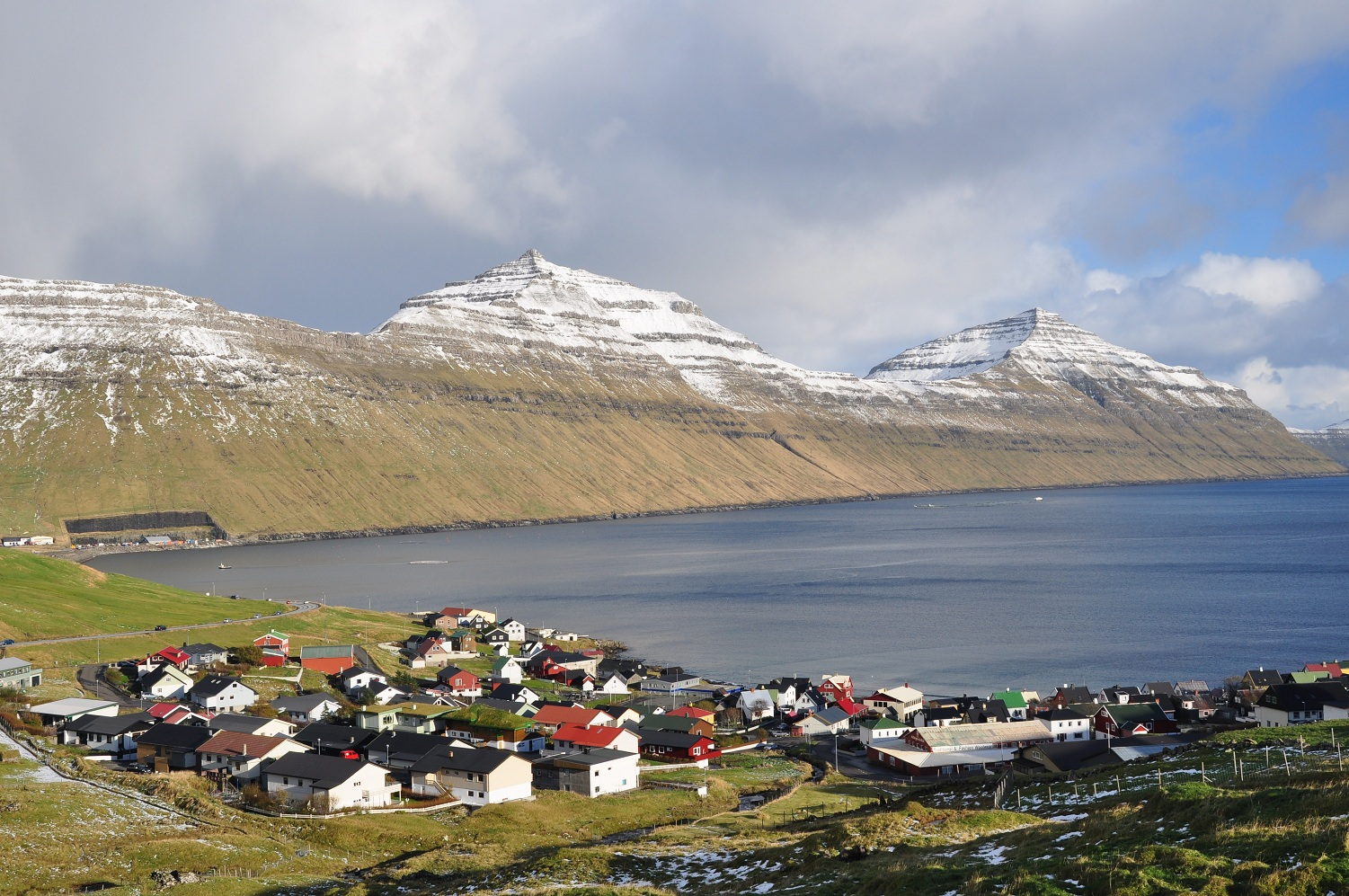
- View of Syðrugøta

- Location in the Faroe Islands
- Coordinates: 62°11′12″N 6°45′12″W
- State: Kingdom of Denmark
- Constituent country: Faroe Islands
- Island: Eysturoy
- Municipality: Eystur Municipality

Population (September 2025)
  - Total: 512
- Time zone: GMT
  - Summer (DST): UTC+1 (EST)
- Postal code: FO 513
- Climate: Cfc

Syðrugøta (Danish: Sydregøte) is a village on the east coast of the Faroese island of Eysturoy in Eystur Municipality.

As of January 2024, it has a population of 506. Its postal code is FO 513.

Tróndur í Gøtu, the Viking Age chieftain known for his opposition to the arrival of Christianity, is said to have lived in the village.

Archaeological excavations, the most recent of which was in 2006, revealed evidence of Syðrugøta being one of the oldest settlements in the Faroe Islands. Many believe that Norse chieftain Tróndur í Gøtu lived and had his chiefdom in Syðrugøtu - among reasons why being both the horizon view and the short distance to his fleet stationed at Undir Gøtueiði. Unexcavated ruins of past farmhouses remain buried in Syðrugøtu.

== Varðin í Gøtu ==
One of the most influential and wealthy companies in the Faroe Islands, Varðin í Gøtu, is based in Syðrugøta. Varðin í Gøtu owns several large fishing vessels, trawlers, like Tróndur í Gøtu, Finnur Fríði, Jupiter, and Saksaberg. The trawlers fish mackerel, herring, capelin and blue whiting. Varðin í Gøtu is the parent company for these limited companies: Driftin, Desin, Hvanngarður, Krossbrekka, Hvamm, Gulenni (which owns fishing vessels), Varðin Pelagic (a pelagic fish factory), and Uppisjóvarhavnin (the harbour in Tvøroyri where Varðin Pelagic was built in 2012). The CEO of Varðin í Gøtu is Jákup Jacobsen, also known as Dunga Jákup. His son Bogi Jacobsen is the CEO of Varðin Pelagic and board member of all of Varðin's subsidiary companies. Around 350 people work for the companies of Varðin í Gøtu.

== Music ==
G! Festival is an annual Faroese festival held in Syðrugøta, and it is one of the largest festivals in the Faroe Islands. The village also where singer Eivør Pálsdóttir and her sister Elinborg were born.

== Notable residents ==
- Eivør (born 1983), singer-songwriter
- Elinborg (born 1996), singer-songwriter
- Sámal Petur í Grund (born 1958), Sjálvstýri party leader and member of the Løgting

== Gallery ==
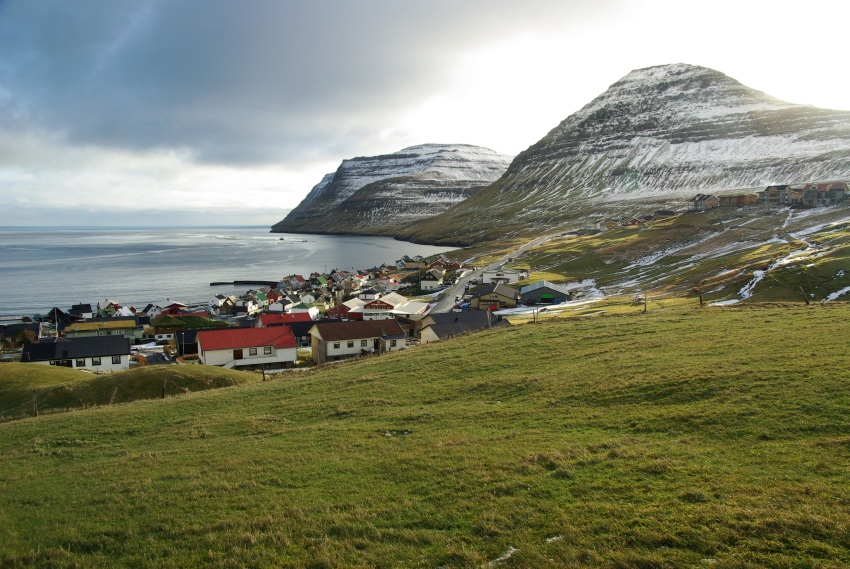
View of Syðrugøta

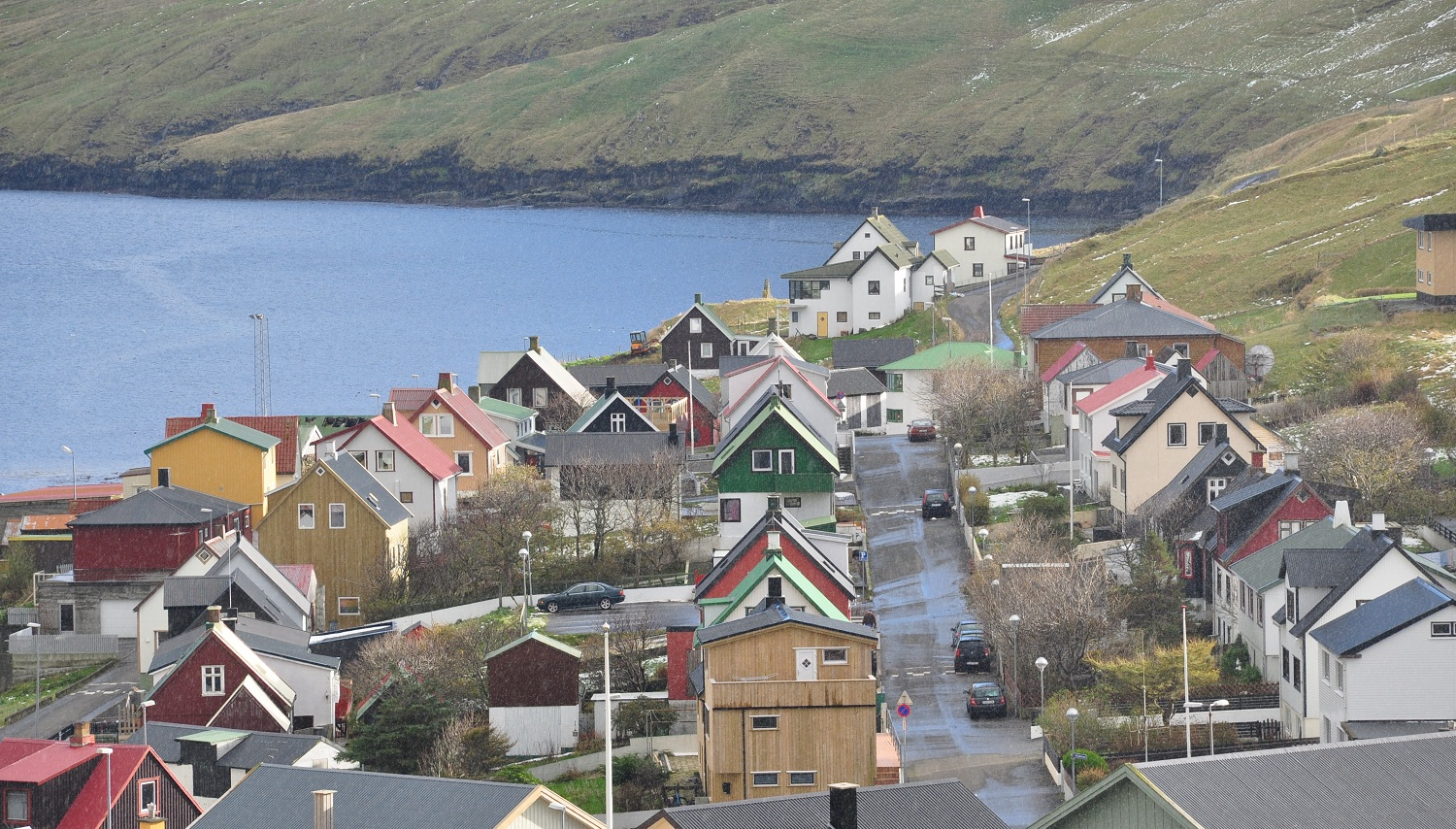
Street in Syðrugøta

== See also ==
- List of towns in the Faroe Islands
