= Vilst er síðsta fet =

Studio album by Hamferð
- Released: 14 December 2010
- Recorded: Summer 2010
- Genre: Doom metal
- Length: 30:31
- Label: Tutl Records
- Producer: Theodor Kapnas

Singles from Vilst er síðsta fet
- 1. "Harra Guð títt dýra navn og æra" Released: 2010

Vilst er síðsta fet (Lost is the last step) is the debut EP by the Faroese doom metal band Hamferð. It was released on December 14, 2010 via Tutl Records.

== Track listing ==
1. "Harra Guð títt dýra navn og æra" (God the Lord, Thy Precious Name and Honour) – 4:45
2. "Vráin" (The Alcove) – 8:25
3. "Aldan revsar eitt vargahjarta" (The Wave Smites a Wolf's Heart) – 8:37
4. "At enda" (To an End) – 8:57

== Personnel ==
Hamferð

- Jón Aldará – Vocals
- John Áki Egholm – Guitars
- Theodor Kapnas – Guitars
- Esmar Joensen – Keyboards
- Tinna Tótudóttir – Bass
- Remi Kofoed Johannesen – Drums

Additional musicians and production

- Astrid Lindh – Percussion on the intro of Harra Guð títt dýra navn og æra
- Björn Guo – Violin on At enda
- Karl Appelgren – Grand piano on At enda
- Mastering – Peter in de Betou
- Reamping of distorted guitars – Greg Tomao
