= Dan Clews (album) =

Studio album by Dan Clews
- Released: 15 December 2009
- Genre: Folk, folk-rock, acoustic pop
- Length: 34:24
- Producer: Giles Martin

Dan Clews chronology
The Good Mile (2005)	Dan Clews (2009)	Tourist in My Own Backyard (2014)

Professional ratings
Review scores
Source	Rating
Record Collector	4/5 stars

Dan Clews is the debut solo album from English folk singer-songwriter Dan Clews, released on 15 December 2009.

== Track listing ==
All tracks are written by Dan Clews

No.	Title	Length
1.	"Lucid And Sincere"	3:44
2.	"Day & Night"	2.49
3.	"Out In The Garden"	4.33
4.	"Move Too Fast"	5.37
5.	"Saltry Man"	3.33
6.	"The Ripening Of Time"	4.37
7.	"Kings For Blood"	2.59
8.	"I Am Invincible"	3.03
9.	"This Car"	1:58
10.	"Islands In The Blue"	3:58
