= Boys in a Band =

Faroese indie rock band

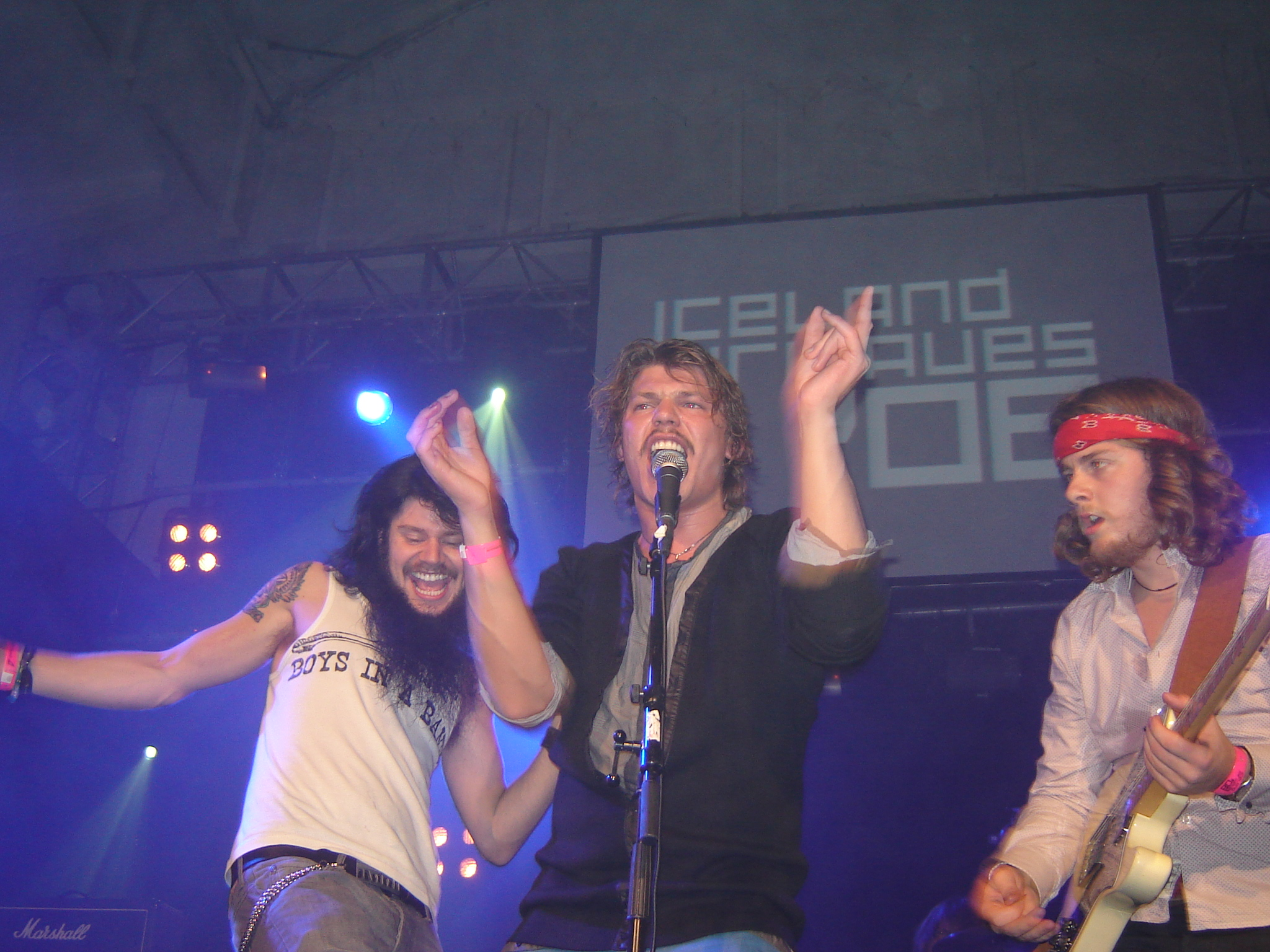
- Boys in a Band at Iceland Airwaves 2008

Background information
- Also known as: BIAB
- Origin: Norðragøta, Eysturoy, Faroe Islands
- Genres: Alternative rock, indie rock
- Years active: 2006–present
- Labels: Independent
- Members: Pætur Zachariasson; Heri Schwartz; Heini; Símun Sakaris; The Rógvi

Boys in a Band are an indie rock band from the Faroe Islands. Formed in 2006 in Gøta, the group comprises vocalist/guitarist Pætur Zachariasson, guitarist Heini, bassist Símun Sakaris, drummer The Rógvi, and Heri Schwartz on hammond organ. The band members claim to play Cowboy Rock. They are the winners of Global Battle of the Bands (2007) (GBOB).

== History ==
=== 2006 ===
Boys in a Band formed in September 2006. The same year, they took part in the international music competition GBOB, earning second spot. Through 2006, they managed to become one of the most popular live acts in the Faroes, and despite never having released a record, this secured them a nomination in the annual Planet Awards, a local Faroese award show, which is sponsored by the daily paper Sosialurin. The band managed to win their nomination, which was in the category "best newcomer 2006".

=== 2007 ===
The following year, the band continued taking part in competitions. Firstly in a local songwriting contest which was part of the bi-annual Nordic showcase AME (Atlantic Music Event). Here, their song "Secrets to Conceal" came in third place.

Later that year, the boys entered the GBOB competition one more time. This time proved more lucky and the band went on to take first place in the world finals, ahead of over 3,000 other bands from 25 different countries. The prize was $100,000 (US), and a world tour.

In 2007, they performed live at the Roskilde Festival (DK), Spot (DK), G! Festival (FO), and Iceland Airwaves (IS).

=== 2008 ===
In January 2008, Boys in a Band went to London to record their first album with Ken Thomas, who is best known for his work with the Icelandic group Sigur Rós and Depeche Mode's singer Dave Gahan. 2008 proved to be the most fruitful and busy year yet for the band. They played festivals like Eurosonic (NL), by:Larm (NO), Canadian Music Week (CA), SXSW (US), The Great Escape (UK), and SPOT (DK). In July, they broke the world record for most shows in 24 hours, playing no less than 24 gigs in the Faroe Islands.

The boys played at Iceland Airwaves in Reykjavík again in October 2008.

== Music ==
Boys in a Band describe their music as "Bob Dylan on amphetamine", due to the energetic nature of their old-school songs, which, among others, are inspired by Dylan, as are their lyrics. According to the boys, their music is a mixture of new rock and roll with traditional American folk/blues roots, adding, "This, together with the band's strict dress code, is the recipe for cowboy rock, a genre yet only mastered by Boys in a Band."

Boys in a Band are still unsigned and their first album, Black Diamond Train, was released in the Faroe Islands on 19 July 2008.
