= Tourist in My Own Backyard =

Studio album by Dan Clews
- Released: 28 April 2014
- Genre: Folk, folk rock, acoustic pop
- Length: 38:26
- Label: George Martin Publishing

Dan Clews chronology
Dan Clews (2009)	Tourist in My Own Backyard (2014)

Tourist in My Own Backyard is the second solo album from English folk singer-songwriter Dan Clews. It was released on 28 April 2014.

== Music videos ==
Three music videos were commissioned for Tourist in My Own Backyard: "Take One Away", "That's Enough for Me", and the lead single, "Edge of the World".

The video for "Take One Away" was directed by Zac Moss. Clews would later compose and perform the soundtrack to Exile, a short 2013 horror film directed by Moss. The soundtrack, inspired by the work of drone metal bands such as Earth and Sunn O))), would be a departure from Clews's singer-songwriter background.

== Track listing ==
All tracks are written by Dan Clews

No.	Title	Length
1.	"Take One Away"	3:10
2.	"Broken People"	5:04
3.	"Bring You Round"	3:30
4.	"My Angels Keep Me Safe"	4:16
5.	"I Still Feel"	4:06
6.	"Pixie Poem"	2:59
7.	"That's Enough for Me"	3:18
8.	"Edge of the World"	3:21
9.	"Same Old Roots"	4:09
10.	"Only Love"	3:57

Two tracks are re-recordings of songs from Dan Clews and the Stars Above's LP, The Good Mile (2005): "Bring You Round" (previously recorded as "We'll Bring You Round") and "Pixie Poem".
