= Eivør (singer) =

Faroese singer-songwriter (born 1983)

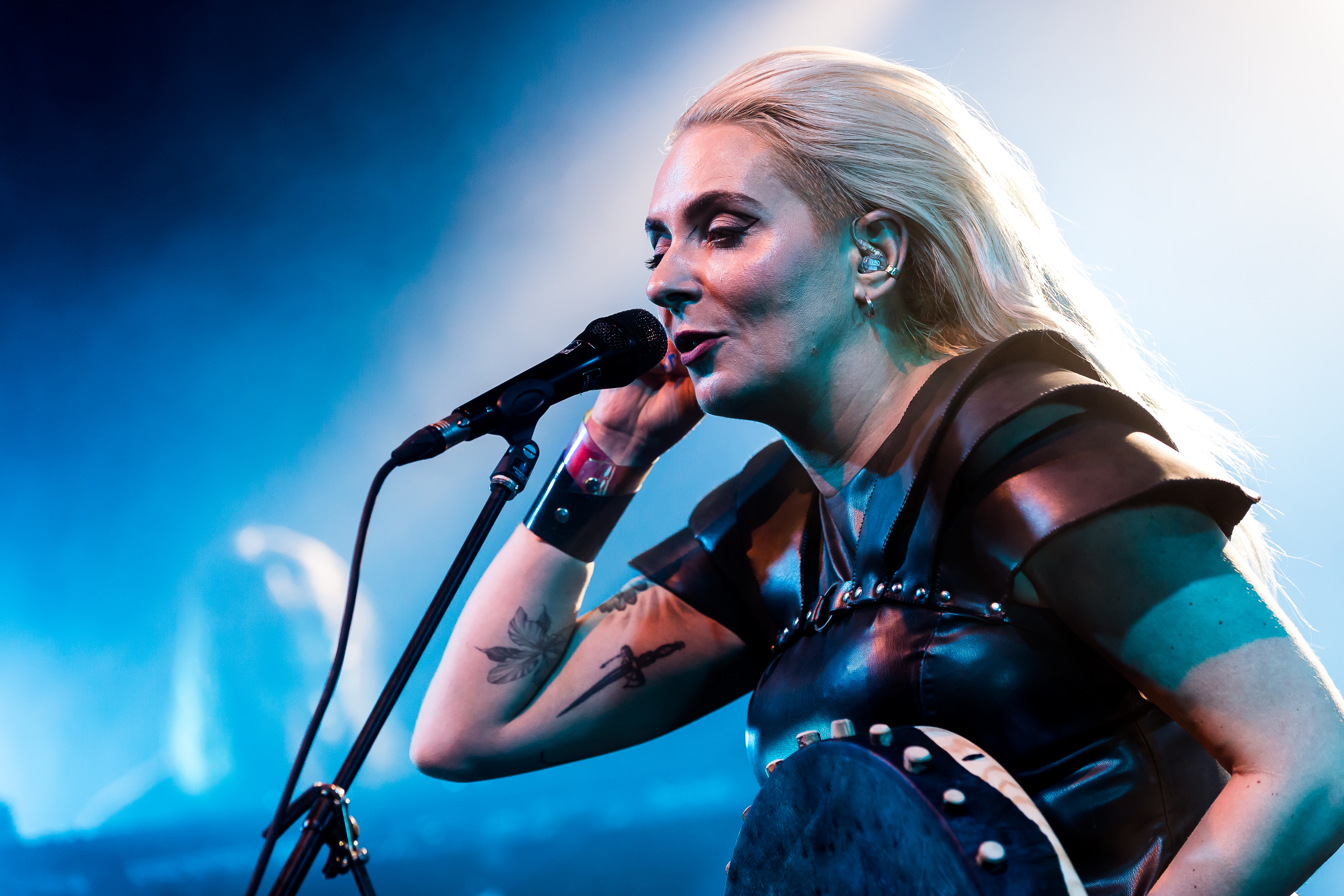
- Eivør performing at the Täubchenthal in Leipzig, 2022

Background information
- Born: Eivør Pálsdóttir; 21 July 1983 (age 43); Syðrugøta, Faroe Islands, Kingdom of Denmark
- Genres: Art pop; chamber pop; synth pop; folk pop; folk rock; electropop; jazz; Nordic folk
- Occupations: Singer, songwriter
- Instruments: Bodhrán; kalimba; guitar
- Years active: 1996–present
- Labels: TUTL; Season of Mist
- Spouse: Tróndur Bogason (m. 2012)
- Website: eivor.com

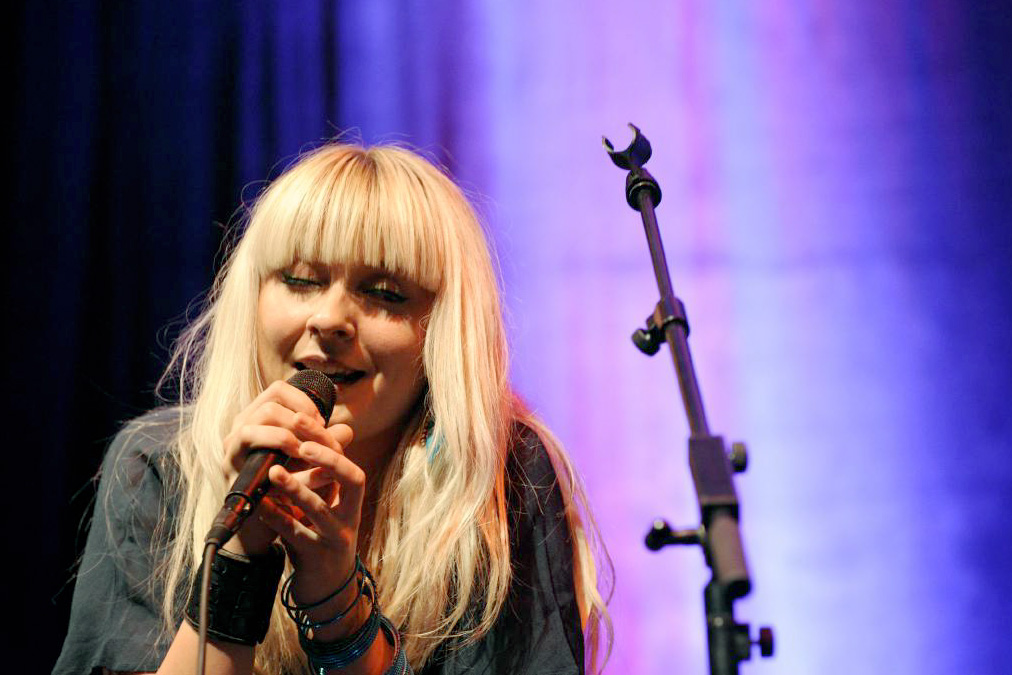
Eivør Pálsdóttir, Moers festival 2009

Eivør Pálsdóttir (Faroese pronunciation: [ˈaivøːɹ ˈpʰɔl̥sˌtœʰtɪɹ]; born 21 July 1983), known mononymously as Eivør, is a Faroese singer-songwriter. Born and raised in Syðrugøta, she had her first televised performance at the age of 13. Over the course of her decades-long career, her musical output has spanned a wide range of genres such as folk, art pop, jazz, folk rock, classical and electronica.

She is the elder sister of singer Elinborg.

== Career ==
In 1999, at the age of 15, she became the lead singer in Clickhaze. The following year, she released her first self-titled album, Eivør Pálsdóttir, and then won the 2001 Prix Føroyar song contest as part of the band Clickhaze. She moved to Reykjavík in 2002 to study music, releasing an album with Yggdrasil the same year. Her second solo album, Krákan, released in 2003 and was nominated in three categories at the Icelandic Music Awards, winning Best Singer and Best Performer – an honour normally only reserved for Icelandic artists. The same year, she participated in Söngvakeppnin with the song "Í Nótt", reaching 6th place.

In 2004, Eivør was named Ársins Føroyingur (Faroe Islander of the Year).

In 2005, the DR Big Band released its 40th anniversary album, with all songs written and sung by Eivør. The same year, her performance of Úlfhamssaga led to her winning the awarded the Icelandic Gríma award. In 2007, Eivør's 5th album Mannabarn was released; an English-language version, Human Child, was released on the same day.

In 2010, she released the album Larva, marking a stark departure away from her folk sound, moving towards a more experimental and electronic musical style.

She married the Faroese composer and long-time collaborator Tróndur Bogason in 2012; the same year, she released the album Room, which won three awards at the Faroese Music Awards: Best Female Singer, Best Artist and Best Album of the Year. The following year, she covered "Den vilda" by One More Time in Icelandic, which charted on Tónlist TV.

In 2015, Eivør released two companion albums, Bridges and Slør, sung in English and Faroese respectively. Describing the writing process in an interview with Stacja Islandia, she said that "[it] kept coming to me in such a manner that I would write a lyric in English and straight afterwards a lyric in Faroese would arrive – a kind of mirror image or reflection. Most of the songs were written together in pairs. The albums are therefore two different works yet also a unity. This has been my dream project for over 2 years now."

In 2016, she collaborated with Bear McCreary on the soundtrack for God of War, performing it with a live orchestra at the E3 2016 Sony press conference. She collaborated with the DR Big Band once again that same year, releasing the orchestral album At the Heart of a Selkie. In 2018, she collaborated with John Lunn on the soundtrack to The Last Kingdom. In 2020, she released the album Segl. She became the cover artist first time of ÖMC Dergi (Dergi), Turkey's biggest digital music magazine, to promote her new album Segl. 2022 saw her collaborating again with Bear McCreary on the soundtrack for God of War Ragnarök, the sequel to 2018's game.

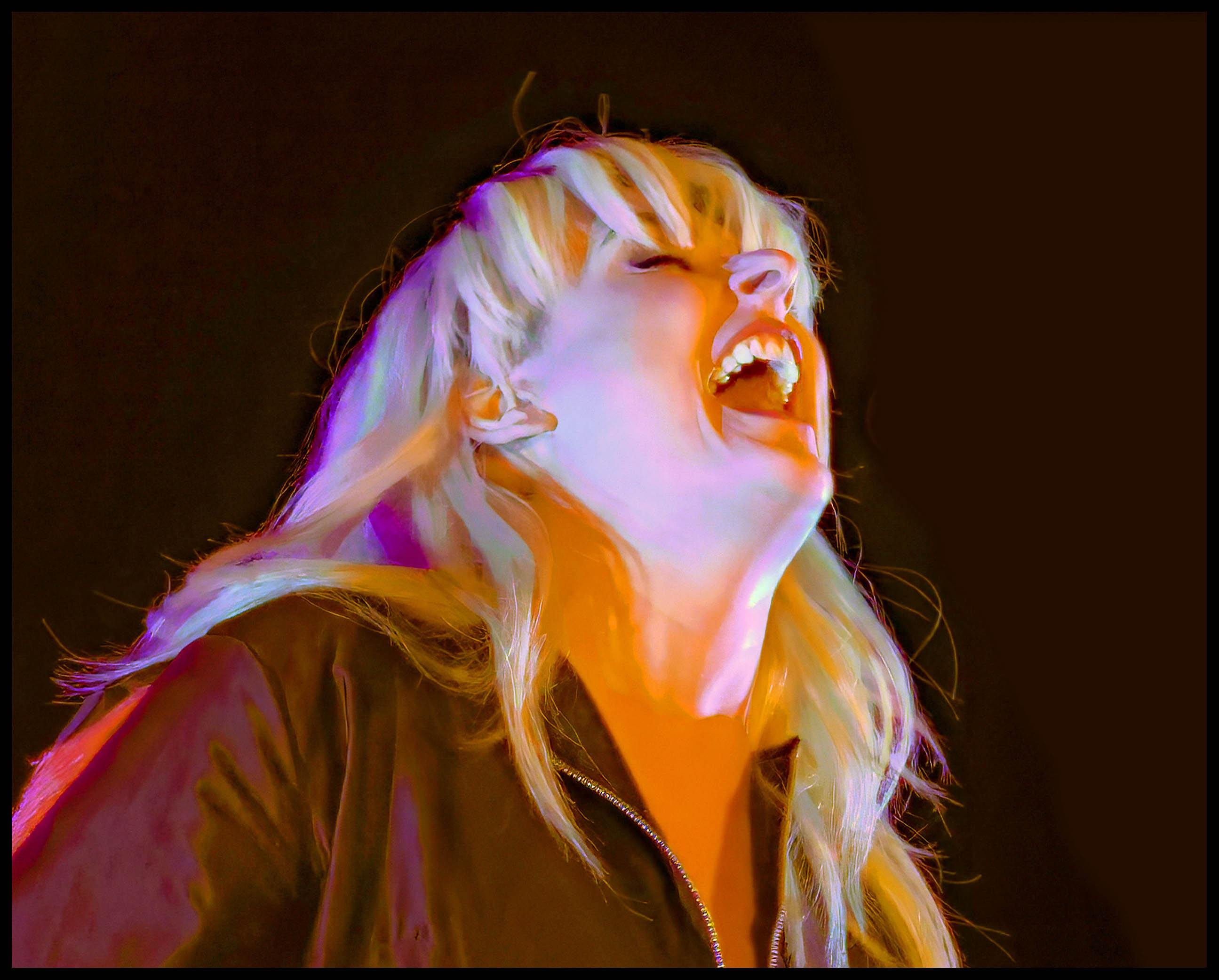
Eivør at Iceland Airwaves, 2018

Describing the about album process in an interview with Alp Kılıç, she said that "I think that every album I make is marked by where I am in my life creatively and also personally, and every album has elements from my previous work entwined with new elements which I am curious to explore. Slør is very much about home sickness and returning back to my roots. Segl is more about looking out and navigating though unknown places." ÖMC Dergi (Dergi) announced for the first time the Segl album and Segl Tour news in Turkey. In 2021, she received Nordic Council Music Prize.

In September 2023, independent label Season of Mist announced on Instagram that Eivør had signed with them.

In July 2025, the label Nuclear Blast announced the signing of a deal with Eivør.

== Discography ==
=== Solo studio albums ===
- Eivør Pálsdóttir (2000)
- Krákan (2003)
- Eivør (2004)
- Human Child (2007)
- Mannabarn (2007, Faroese version of Human Child)
- Larva (2010)
- Room (2012)
- Bridges (2015)
- Slør (2017)
- Segl (2020)
- Enn (2024)
- Tungl (2026)

=== Collaborative albums ===
- Trollabundin (with Danish Radio Big Band, 2005)
- Manstu Gamla Daga (with Iceland Symphony Orchestra, and Ragnheiður Gröndal, 2011)
- The Color of Dark (with Ginman, 2014)
- At the Heart of a Selkie (with Peter Jensen & the Danish Radio Big Band, and the Danish National Vocal Ensemble (SHD175, Tutl Records, 2016)

=== EPs ===
- Clickhaze EP (HJF 91, Tutl Records, 2002)
- Undo Your Mind EP (Copenhagen Records 2010)
- Eivor EP (Copenhagen Records 2014)

=== Live albums ===
- Eivör Live (Copenhagen Records 2009)
- London Solo Sessions (Live) EP, (Tutl Records, A&G Records Ltd., 2017)
- Live in Tórshavn (Norse Music, 2018)
- Segl Live in Concert (Norse Music, 2022)

=== Soundtracks ===
- The Last Kingdom Original Television Soundtrack (with John Lunn) (Carnival, 2018)
- The Last Kingdom: Destiny Is All (With John Lunn and Danny Saul) (Carnival, 2023)

=== Singles ===
- "Undo Your Mind" (2010)
- "Dansaðu vindur" (2013)
- "Faithful Friend" (2015)
- "Remember Me" (2015)
- "In My Shoes" (2017)

=== Guest appearances and collaborations ===
- Nephew feat. Eivør – "Police Bells and Church Sirens" (2010)
- Vamp – "I Full Symfoni II" (live album) (2010)
- Beginner's Guide to Scandinavia (Nascente/Demon Music Group, 2011)
- Nik & Jay feat. Eivør – "Bølgerne ved Vesterhavet" (2012)
- Vamp – "Liten Fuggel" (2012)
- Hamferð – "Sinnisloysi" from Evst (2013)
- The Last Kingdom television soundtrack (2015) – vocals; in score by John Lunn
- The Banner Saga 3 video game soundtrack (2018) – vocals, score by Austin Wintory
- God of War video game soundtrack (2018) – vocals, throat and drums; score by Bear McCreary
- Worakls feat. Eivør – "Red Dressed" (2019)
- Lydmor feat. Eivør – "Nevada" (2021)
- God of War Ragnarök video game soundtrack (2022) – vocals; score by Bear McCreary
- The Singularity - concept rock album by Bear McCreary (2024)

== Filmography ==
- Eivør: True Love (2013) – Main actress
- 111 Góðir Dagar (2021) – Supporting actress

== Honours ==
- 2004 Faroe Islander of the Year
- 2006 Planet Awards – Best female singer (Faroese music awards)
- 2009 Planet Awards – Best female singer
- 2006 Best Danish female folk from Jylland (Årets danske Folk Vokalist)
- 2012 Planet Awards – Best female singer / Best artist / Best album for Room
- 2013 Nominated for the Nordic Council Music Prize
- 2013 DJBFA (Danish Jazz, Beat and Folkmusic Authors) Award
- 2021 The Nordic Council Music Prize
