= Evst (album) =

Studio album by Hamferð
- Released: October 11, 2013
- Studio: Studio Bloch
- Genre: Doom metal
- Length: 45:19
- Label: Tutl
- Producer: Theodor Kapnas

Evst (Topmost) is the first full-length album by the Faroese doom metal band Hamferð. It was released on October 11, 2013, in the Faroe Islands via Tutl.

== Reception ==
In a positive review, the Sonic Seducer noted the album's mix of melancholic doom metal and clean song and instrumental parts.

== Track listing ==
No.	Title	Length
1.	"Evst" (Topmost)	5:50
2.	"Deyðir varðar" (Dead Beacons)	8:45
3.	"Við teimum kvirru gráu" (With the Calm Gray Ones)	7:25
4.	"At jarða tey elskaðu" (To Bury the Beloved)	4:07
5.	"Sinnisloysi" (Madness)	8:46
6.	"Ytst" (Outermost)	10:26

== Personnel ==
Hamferð

- Jón Aldará – Vocals
- John Áki Egholm – Guitars
- Theodor Kapnas – Guitars
- Esmar Joensen – Keyboards
- Jenus Í Trøðini – Bass
- Remi Kofoed Johannesen – Drums

=== Additional musicians and production ===
- Eivør Pálsdóttir – vocals on Sinnisloysi
- Seismic audio arrangement – ORKA with Jens L. Thomsen, Uni Árting and Theodor Kapnas
- Production, engineering and mixing – Theodor Kapnas
- Mastering – Tony Lindgren
- Reamping of distorted guitars – Greg Tomao
- Artwork – Jón Sonni Jensen
