= Tróndur í Gøtu (2010 ship) =

Fishing trawler launched in 2010

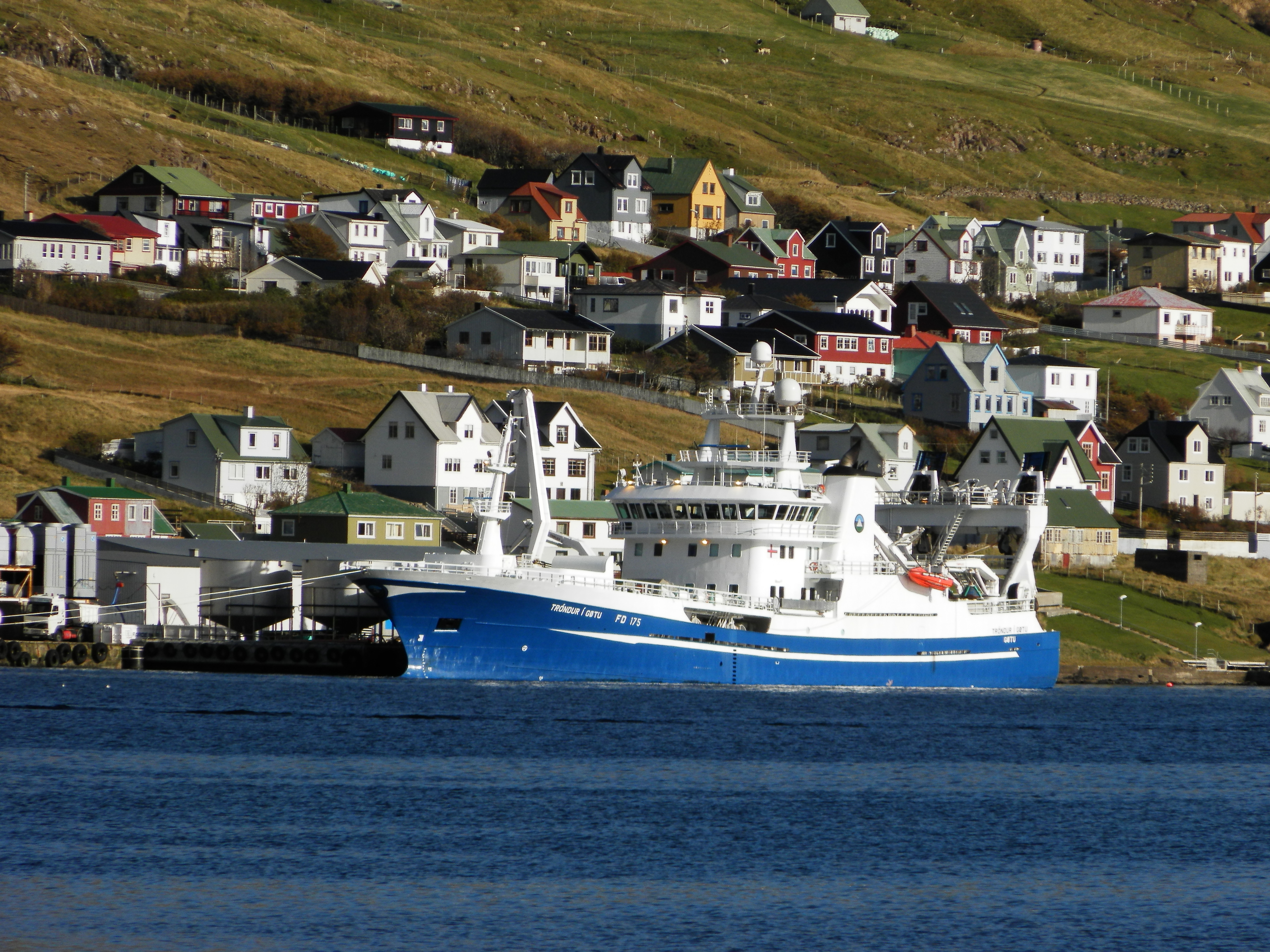
- Tróndur í Gøtu

History
- Name: Tróndur í Gøtu
- Owner: Varðin
- Operator: Varðin
- Port of registry: Gøta, Faroe Islands
- Builder: Karstensens Skibsværft A/S, Skagen, Denmark
- Cost: 260 million Danish kroner
- Identification: IMO number: 9463255; Calling sign: XPXM
- Status: Fishing pelagic fish

General characteristics
- Tonnage: 3,524 GT
- Length: 81 m (265 ft 9 in)
- Draught: 7.20 m (23 ft 7 in)
- Installed power: Wärtsila 12V32, 6.000 KW; Light engine: 1) Wärtsila 6L20, 1.110 KW; 2) Wärtsila 8L20, 1.450 KW; 3) Wärtsila 300HS, 300 KW

Tróndur í Gøtu is a Faroese a fishing trawler and purse seiner. It belongs to the Faroese company Varðin, based in Syðrugøta. Tróndur í Gøtu is active in the pelagic fishing industry and fishes mainly mackerel, herring, capelin and blue whiting in the sea around the Faroe Islands and elsewhere, depending on where the Faroe Islands gets fishing quotas. The ship was built in 2010 on Karstensens Skibsværft A/S in Skagen, Denmark. Tróndur í Gøtu lands most of its catches to the pelagic fish factory Varðin Pelagic in Tvøroyri and to Havsbrún in Fuglafjørður.
