= Valkyrja =

Swedish black metal band

- Origin: Stockholm, Sweden
- Genres: Black metal
- Years active: 2004–present
- Label: World Terror Committee
- Members: Simon Wizén; A. L. Jocke Wallgren; Vlad Lefay
- Website: www.valkyrja.se

Valkyrja is a black metal band from Stockholm, Sweden formed in 2004. The band's line-up consists of Simon Wizén, A. L., Jocke Wallgren, and Vlad Lefay.

== History ==
The band released their first demo in the same year under the name Funeral Voices. The demo was re-released on cassette on September 11, including additional material, on underground label Deathkrush Productions – re-titled Far Beyond. Their debut album was recorded at Necromorbus Studio in March / April of '07 and released in autumn of the same year by German label Northern Silence Productions as a CD in jewel case, special edition CD in a metal case and 12" LP on black / marble wax. They recorded their second album in June/July 2009 at Necromorbus Studio in Stockholm, Sweden. The album, 'Contamination', was released on January 15, 2010 through Metal Blade Records.

They recorded their third album, 'The Antagonist's Fire', in June/July 2013 again at Necromorbus Studio in Stockholm, and again produced by Tore Stjerna, and the album was released on 11 November 2013 through World Terror Committee. Neil Pretorious of About.com reviewed the album, awarding it 4/5, writing that "this is an ace album on all fronts. That patented Swedish vibe is all over the place, the delivery is tight and energetic and the production is surprisingly crisp." Marcos Garcia of Metal Temple also praised the album, giving it 9/10, writing that "they really show a musical style that deserves our attention."

== Discography ==
=== Albums ===
- The Invocation of Demise – CD & 12" LP, 2007, Northern Silence / Cassette, 2008, Ancient Dreams / CD Reissue, 2009, Metal Blade Records
- Contamination – CD, 01/15/2010, Metal Blade Records
- The Antagonist's Fire – CD & 12" LP, 11/11/13, World Terror Committee

=== Demos ===
- Funeral Voices – CD, 2005, self-released
- Far Beyond – Cassette, 2005, DeathKrush

== Band members ==
=== Current members ===
- S.W. - Guitars (2004–present)
- RSDX – Vocals (2016–present)
- Jocke Wallgren – Drums (2007–2010, 2011–present)
- V.P. - Bass (2010–present)

=== Past members ===
- J. Lindgren – Bass (2004–2007)
- Skall – Drums (2004–2006)
- Xephroth – Guitars (2004–2005)
- A. Hed – Guitars (2005–2010)
- M.A. - Bass (2007–2010)
