= Dan Clews =

British singer-songwriter

- Born: Daniel Clews; 21 March 1980 (age 46)
- Origin: Sevenoaks, Kent, England
- Genres: Folk, folk-rock, acoustic pop
- Occupations: Musician, record producer
- Instruments: Guitar, vocals
- Years active: 2005–present
- Formerly of: Dan Clews and the Stars Above

Daniel Clews (born 21 March 1980) is a British-born singer-songwriter from Sevenoaks, Kent, England.

== Musical career ==
Clews spent years on the UK's live circuit before moving to Sweden and beginning collaborations with local artists which resulted in two releases with his backing band The Stars Above, one of which helped Clews secure a publishing deal with George Martin Music.

Clews's first solo album, Dan Clews, was released on 15 December 2009. The album received support from national and regional radio in the form of several spot plays on the Bob Harris Radio 2 show. The album received favourable reviews in the December 2009 issues of Mojo, Uncut Record Collector and The Guardian.

Clews recorded over 20 sessions for BBC regional radio stations and appeared on the Bob Harris Radio 2 show broadcast 10 July 2010.

Clews is a co-founder of We Teach Music, which provides private tuition and music workshops in Kent.

== Discography ==
Dan Clews and the Stars Above

- The Good Mile (2005)

Dan Clews

- Dan Clews (2009)
- Tourist in My Own Backyard (2014)
- While Middle England Mows Its Lawn (2017)
