= Sic (band) =

Faroese band

SIC
- Origin: Tórshavn, Faroe Islands
- Genres: Metalcore, thrash metal, death metal
- Years active: 2002–present
- Label: Tutl Records (2007–present)
- Members: Mikkjal Hansen; Eddie Jacobsen; Frans Arge Galán; Gudmar Hansen; Dennis Buhl

SIC is a metalcore/thrash metal band from Tórshavn, the capital of the Faroe Islands.

== History ==
=== 2002–2006: The first steps ===
The band was formed in 2002 by guitarist Eddie Jacobsen. In 2003 singer Mikkjal G. Hansen joined the band and in February 2005 the fold was joined by drummer Magnus Hansen, guitarist Frans Arge Galán and bassist Gudmar Hansen. SIC remained focused on what their music should sound like and were constantly writing and rearranging songs in anticipation for their debut album Pandemonium.

=== 2007: Debut album ===
SIC hooked up with producer Tommy Hansen at Jailhouse Studios, in Denmark. In September 2006 the band began recording their debut album, the process of which took 15 days. The album was released on 26 February 2007 via Tutl Records and was warmly embraced by the media and fans worldwide. Print magazines and webzines from countries such as Peru, Germany, Norway, Denmark, Greece, UK, USA etc. all gave positive feedback on Pandemonium.

=== 2007–2009: The Pandemonium years ===
In November 2007, SIC hired independent band manager Orpheus Spiliotopoulos (Scar of The Sun, Kinetic, ex-Dreamtone & Iris Mavraki's Neverland). That same month, SIC shot its second official music video, in Greece, for the song "Rosegarden In Hell" with Greek director Achilleas Gatsopoulos who had previously directed the video for Dark Tranquillity's "Monochromatic Stains" and had also worked in the art department for such movies as Charlie and the Chocolate Factory and Harry Potter and the Prisoner of Azkaban. The video premiered on MTV Denmark's Headbangers Ball, presented by the show's host and VJ Anne Lindfjeld on 13 April 2008.

During 2007–2008, the band promoted its debut album by playing numerous live gigs, mainly in their home country, in Iceland and in the UK, as well as in Greece, with the highlight of this period being the band's appearance at Sweden's famous Metaltown Festival in June 2008.

On 19 February 2009, SIC ventured off in its first ever large-scale European tour starting with Norway where the band played six gigs, supported by Norwegian metal act Goddamn. The tour continued On 2 April with the band providing live support for Danish act Hatesphere on their "Alive and Dressed To The Nines Tour 2009" which counted twenty six shows throughout Germany, Austria, Denmark , The Netherlands, Slovenia, Slovakia , Switzerland and the Czech Republic. The particular tour also featured Artas (Austria) and The Dying (Belgium) during its first half, Bloodwork (Germany) and Six Reasons to Kill (Germany) on the second half, and during two shows on the entire leg, famous French death metal act Gojira was the headliner.

After the leg with Hatesphere was complete on 3 May 2009, the band continued its touring activities directly into the UK, for the second time in its career, were SIC spent the entire month performing gig after gig in over 15 cities all over the country. Support on select dates came from Ten Tonne Dozer (Shetland Islands, UK), Def-Con One (UK) and Attica Rage (UK) among others. After the entire tour was over, the band returned to the Faroe Islands in early June 2009 to perform at several local summer festivals, such as the prestigious G! Festival and Við Múrin.

=== 2010–present: Fighters They Bleed ===
In late December 2009, Magnus Hansen departed from SIC in order to take some time off to sort out personal matters. Later SIC announced that the temporary replacement of Magnus Hansen would be Dennis Buhl (Evil Masquerade, ex Hatesphere).

On 21 August the band released its second album, tentatively titled Fighters They Bleed, which is also the title for one of their new songs. The album was mixed and mastered at Antfarm Studios, in Åarhus, Denmark, by Tue Madsen. Tue has also been working with metal bands such as Dark Tranquillity and Hatesphere.

In March 2013 they won the local competition Wacken Metal Battle for the Faroe Islands. They will therefore play at the Wacken Open Air in Germany in August 2013.

== Band members ==
=== Current members ===
- Mikkjal Hansen – vocals (2003–2021)
- Eddie Jacobsen – guitar (2002–present)
- Dennis Buhl – drums (2010–present)
- Ísak Petersen – bass (2013–present) (live)
- Henning Jensen – guitar (2013–present) (live)

=== Former ===
- Magnus Hansen – drums (2005–2009)
- Kári Skibenæs – drums (2002–2005)
- Meinhard Joensen – bass (2003–2005)
- Gudmar Hansen – bass (2005–2013)
- Frans Arge Galán – guitar (2005–2013)

== Discography ==
=== Demos ===
- Reasons

=== Full length ===
- Pandemonium (2007, Tutl Records)
- Si Vis Pacem, Para Bellum (2010, Tutl Records)
- Fighters They Bleed (2011, Mighty Music – 2010, Tutl Records)

=== Video singles ===
- To Dare to Risk to Regret
- Rosegarden in Hell
