= Afenginn =

Danish folk music group

- Origin: Copenhagen
- Genres: Post-classical; nordic folk; neo-folk; chamber pop
- Years active: 2002–present
- Labels: Tutl, Westpark Music
- Members: Kim Rafael Nyberg; Rasmus Krøyer; Niels Skovmand; Erik Olevik; Ulrik Brohuus; Knut Finsrud; Jonas Nakel
- Past members: Andrzej Krejniuk; Aske Jacoby; Rune Kofoed
- Website: http://www.afenginn.com

Afenginn (lit. 'intoxication' or 'strength' in Old Norse) is a post-classical, nordic folk band formed in Copenhagen in 2002.

== History ==
The band was formed in 2000, after Rune Kofoed and Kim Rafael Nyberg had seen each-others ads looking for band members. The group began meeting in an old industrial yard in the harbour area of Copenhagen along with Andrzej Krejniuk. Initially, they experimented with different styles and genres, but eventually were inspired by Hedningarna to pursue a folk style. In 2002, Niels Skovmand and Rasmus Krøyer joined the band. Afenginn played their first concert at Dragens Hule, an underground club in Copenhagen, in May the same year. They went on to perform at Odense Folk Festival and Kulturhavn Copenhagen later that year. In 2003, the band recorded their first EP “Tivoli Invaliid” in Reersø with Bjarke Slot.

=== Retrograd ===
In March 2004, Afenginn went on tour to the Faroe Islands and the islands of the North Atlantic playing a total of 7 concerts. The Faroese label TUTL Records attended some of the concerts and offered Afenginn a record deal for their first album, which was then recorded in July. The resulting album, Retrograd, was released in October of 2004 and was followed by a Scandinavian tour. Retrograd won the Danish Music Award for “Best World Album”.

In 2005, the band began working on a orchestral project titled "Nordlyd: Afenginn in Symphony". The concert series was built around an orchestration of Afenginn's music, performed by the band and a complete symphony orchestra.

=== Akrobakkus ===
Afenginn began preparing their second album, Akrobakkus, in January 2006. The album was recorded in February and featured Zlatko Buric and cimbalom performer George Mihalache, among others. The album was nominated in several categories at the "Danish Folk and World Music Awards".

After Akrobakkus' release in April of 2006, the band's base player, Andrzej Krejniuk, left the group was eventually replaced by Aske Jacoby. Between 2006 and the release of their third album, Afenginn performed several festivals, including Dranouter Festival, By:Larm, and South by Southwest.

=== Reptilica Polaris ===
The band began producing their third album, Reptilica Polaris, in November of 2007 from Jacoby's studio. In 2008, they received a grand from the Danish Arts Council's “Young Elite” program, which awarded the band 400,000 DKK over the following two years. Reptilica Polaris was released in June 2008. The album featured Finnish poet Timo Haapaniemi's abstract syntax error poems and was orchestrated for a male choir, brass band, and the members of Afenginn. The band went on to receive the Danish Music Award for “Best Contemporary Artist” following its release.

=== Bastard Etno ===
Afenginn signed with the German label Westpark Music in 2009 for their next album. The band's fourth album, Bastard Etno, was recorded in a single week. The album was released in November of 2009 and followed by a European tour, including performances at G! Festival and Roskilde Festival. In 2010, it received the Danish Music Award for “World Album of the Year”.

The Cross Connection Ballet Company debuted the ballet SOMA at Bellevue Teatret in 2010, based on Afenginn's music. In 2011, the band took a break. Aske Jacoby left the band and was replaced on bass by Erik Olevik. The band returned for a tour of Canada, Denmark, and Germany.

In 2012 the production Decenniale was set up at Husets Teater in Copenhagen, celebrating the Afenginn's 10th anniversary.

=== Lux and Opus ===
In late 2011, Afenginn recorded the demo for their fifth album, Lux. The album was recorded live in the studio in August 2012 and was completed in three days. It was released on 28 January 2013 by Westpark Music.

Their 6th album Opus is primarily instrumental, and each movement centers around a text sung by Ólavur Jákupsson and written by Nyberg's childhood friend Timo Haapaniemi in an invented language playfully based on Latin.

== Discography ==
- "Tivoli Invaliid" (EP, 2003)
- Retrograd (October 2004)
- Akrobakkus (April 2006)
- Reptilica Polaris (June 2008)
- Bastard Etno (November 2009)
- Lux (January 2013)
- Opus (May 2016)

== Members ==
- Kim Nyberg — Mandolin, the main composer of the band's songs
- Rasmus Krøyer — Clarinet
- Niels Skovmand — Violin
- Erik Olevik — Bass guitar and double bass
- Rune Kofoed — Drums

Former members:

- Aske Jacoby — bass (2006–2011)
- Andrzej Krejniuk – bass (2002–2006)
