= Flamma =

Roman-Syrian gladiator

Flamma (from Latin flamma 'flame') was a gladiator from the Roman province of Syria.

== History ==
Flamma's now-lost gravestone from Sicily, possibly from Palermo, is the only known source recording his life and achievements. The gravestone's epitaph reads, in Latin:

Flamma sec(utor), vix(it) an(nis) XXX;

pugna<vi>t XXXIIII, vicit XXI,

stans VIIII, mis(sus) IIII, nat(ione) Syrus;

hui<c> Delicatus coarmio merenti fecit.

This translates to:

Flamma, secutor. He lived 30 years.

He fought 34 times, won 21 times,

drew 9 times, and was spared 4 times. Syrian by birth.

Delicatus made (this tomb) for a worthy comrade-at-arms.

The epitaph identifies Flamma as a secutor, or "chaser", a class of gladiator who wore heavy armour and fought with sword and shield. Secutors generally fought retiarii, lightly-armoured gladiators whose weapons were the trident and net. The number of fights Flamma engaged in is higher than most gladiators. Many have lower numbers like Purricina Iuvenus (ILS 5107) who fought 5 times or Glaucus of Modena (ILS 5121) who fought 7 times. According to his epitaph, Flamma fought 34 times and won 21 of his matches.

It is a common misconception that Flamma was offered his freedom four times but refused in order to remain a gladiator. Gladiators were occasionally granted the rudis, a wooden sword that symbolized their freedom. Flamma's epitaph, however, does not state that he was ever granted the rudis. Instead, it states that he was granted missus four times. Missus, or missio, was the mercy granted to a gladiator after he surrendered. When missio was denied, the defeated gladiator was executed in the arena by the victor.

Details of Flamma's death are unknown.

== In popular culture ==
Flamma is featured in episode six of the 2025 National Geographic documentary Gladiators: Warriors of the Ancient World.
