= Lena Anderssen =

Faroese/Canadian singer-songwriter

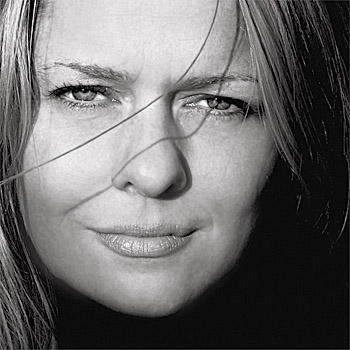

Background information
- Born: Lena Anderssen
- Origin: Tórshavn, Faroe Islands
- Genres: Pop
- Occupations: singer and songwriter
- Instruments: Vocals, guitar
- Years active: 1996—present
- Labels: Independent, ArtPeople
- Website: lenamusic.com

Lena Anderssen is a Faroese/Canadian singer-songwriter with five albums to her name. Her latest album Eagle in the Sky was chosen as Album of the Year on the Faroe Islands at the Faroese Music Awards in 2017. Both her previous albums Letters From The Faroes (2012) and Let Your Scars Dance (2008) also won Album of the Year in The Faroe Islands. Although the lyrics to her songs are all written in English, she is also fluent in both Faroese and Danish. Anderssen is known for her intimate and intense live performances, as well as for having several of her songs featured in TV series like 90210, Scrubs, Felicity, Nikita, Alias, and Miami Social.

== Biography ==
=== Early career ===
Anderssen was born in the Faroe Islands to a Canadian father and a Faroese mother but moved to Canada when she was two years old. Her family relocated numerous times in the following years to Victoria and Vancouver in British Columbia; Thunder Bay, Ontario; and Montreal, Quebec. Just before she turned 17, Anderssen moved back to the land of her birth with her mother and three siblings.

Norwegian drummer Remi Fagereng was visiting a coffee shop in the Faroese capital of Tórshavn, where Anderssen worked, when he overheard her singing to herself and realized her talent. Weeks later, she joined his cover band, Next Step.

=== Long Distance ===
After playing one of the main characters in the successful Faroese musical Skeyk, Anderssen began collaborating with its musical composer, Niclas Johannesen. Together, they wrote the songs that comprised her debut album Long Distance, which was produced by Johannesen and released in the Faroe Islands only.

At the beginning of the new millennium, Anderssen and Johannesen partnered with the Danish Music Awards-winning producer, Óli Poulsen, to produce three songs. One song, "I Still Love You," became a hit when it was released as a radio single in the Faroe Islands.

=== Songwriting ===
During their first three years of collaborative work, the songwriting team of Anderssen and Johannesen penned more than 100 songs, including "Waiting In The Moonlight," which became a breakthrough hit for Faroese vocalist Brandur Enni in 2002. That same year they wrote 10 songs for the Faroese National Radio for use in a Christmas radio play entitled "Stjørnan í Hvarv." The songs were later included in an album of the program, which was released during the Christmas season of 2003.

=== Can't Erase It ===
Anderssen worked with Johannesen and Poulsen again on her next album, Can't Erase It, which was released in Denmark under Danish independent label ArtPeople. The album was chosen as Album of the Week on Danmarks Radio's Programme 4 (P4) as well as on the commercial station Sky Radio. Anderssen promoted the album while touring with American singer-songwriter Beth Hart. Notably, the title track was offered as a free MP3 download on a music website sponsored by Coca-Cola and Paste Magazine. It was one of ten songs in the "European Beats" category of a joint-venture podcast program called "For the Love of Music".

=== Let Your Scars Dance ===
In 2006, Anderssen began work on her third album, Let Your Scars Dance. She traveled to the famous Abbey Road Studios in London, England, to record a live performance of the song "Stones in My Pocket" and put finishing touches on several other tracks. Dan Clews provided the arrangements for the session. The album was released in the Faroe Islands on 30 April 2007 and in Denmark on 27 October 2008. Let Your Scars Dance was chosen as Album of the Year at the Planet Awards in December 2007. In February 2008, readers of Dimmalætting, the oldest and most acclaimed newspaper of the Faroe Islands, voted Let Your Scars Dance as Album of The Year.

=== Letters From The Faroes ===
In November 2011 Lena released her critically acclaimed album "Letters From The Faroes" which was chosen Album of the Year at the Planet Awards in December 2011. The album was scheduled to be released in Denmark in October 2012 through Danish label Artpeople. In November 2012 Danmarks Radio's Programme 4 (P4) chose Letters From The Faroes as Album of the Week. The album was scheduled to be released in Poland in 2013 by MJM Music.

== Discography ==
- Long Distance (1998)
- Can't Erase It (2005)
- Let Your Scars Dance (2008)
- Letters From The Faroes (2011)
- Eagle in the Sky (2016)
- State of the Land (2024)
