= Svavar Knútur =

Icelandic singer-songwriter

Svavar Knútur is the stage name of Icelandic singer-songwriter Svavar Knútur Kristinsson, from the Northwest of Iceland and the Eastfjords, but living in the town of Akureyri. He sings in Icelandic and English and collaborated with Czech singer-songwriter Markéta Irglová on his album Ölduslóð (Way of Waves). He has in recent years toured extensively around Europe as well as doing some touring of Australia and North America. Svavar Knútur is one of the founding members and curators of the Melodica festival, curating the Reykjavík branch of the festival. In the German town of Schleswig Svavar Knútur has played multiple times on the Norden Festival in 2018, 2019 and 2023.

== Album history ==
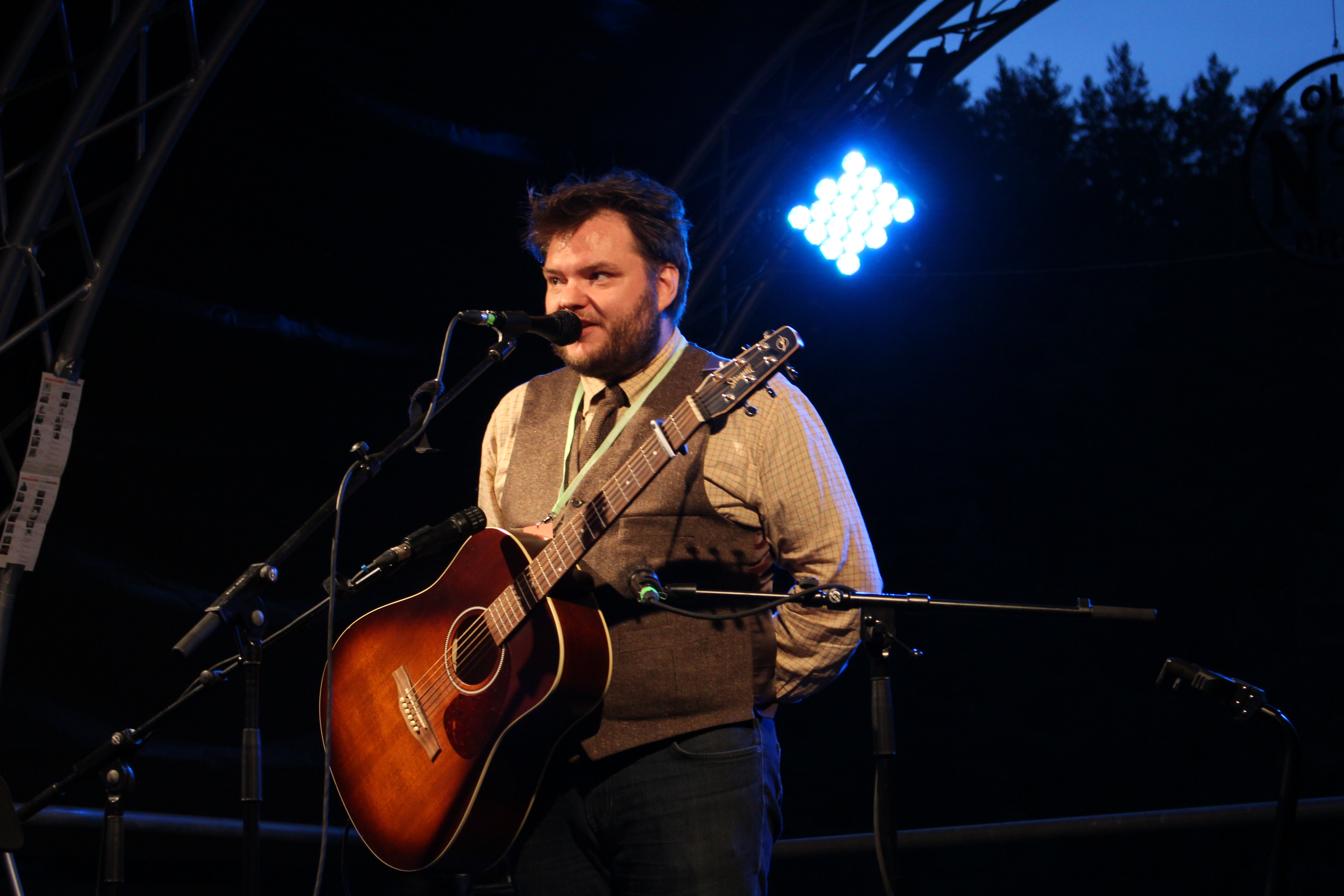
Svavar Knútur at the Acoustic Lakeside Festival 2017

Knútur has released six solo albums beginning in 2009 with "Kvöldvaka (Songs by the Fire)". In 2010, he presented "Amma (Songs for my Grandmother)" and in 2012 his "Ölduslóð (Way of Waves)". In 2015 "Brot (The Breaking)" was released.

In September 2018 Knútur released the album "Ahoy! Side A" via Dimma and Nordic Notes. A story of new beginnings and the challenges of a new world. It contains five new songs and four "Repaintings" of older songs. Most recently, the album "Ahoy! Side B" was released in April 2024.

== Discography ==
- Kvöldvaka (Songs by the fire) (Dimma, 2009)
- Amma (Songs for my Grandmother) (Beste! Unterhaltung, 2010)
- Glæður With Kristjana Stefáns (Dimma, 2011)
- Ölduslóð (Way of Waves) (Beste! Unterhaltung, 2012)
- Songs of Weltschmerz, Waldeinsamkeit and Wanderlust EP (Beste! Unterhaltung; Dimma, 2015)
- Brot (The Breaking) (Nordic Notes, 2015)
- My Goodbye Lovelies (Nordic Notes, 2017)
- AHOY! SIDE A (Nordic Notes, 2018)
- Morgunn (Acoustic Version) Single (2020)
- Bil (Between) EP (Nordic Notes, 2020)
- Faðmlög with Kristjana Stefáns (Nordic Notes, 2020)
- The tide is rising Single (2021)
- Hope and Fortune Single feat. Irish Mythen (2021)
- Unanswered with Lucy Ward and Adyn Townes (2023)
- AHOY! SIDE B (2024)
- Ahoy! Double LP (2024)
