= Annika Hoydal =

Faroese Singer and Actress

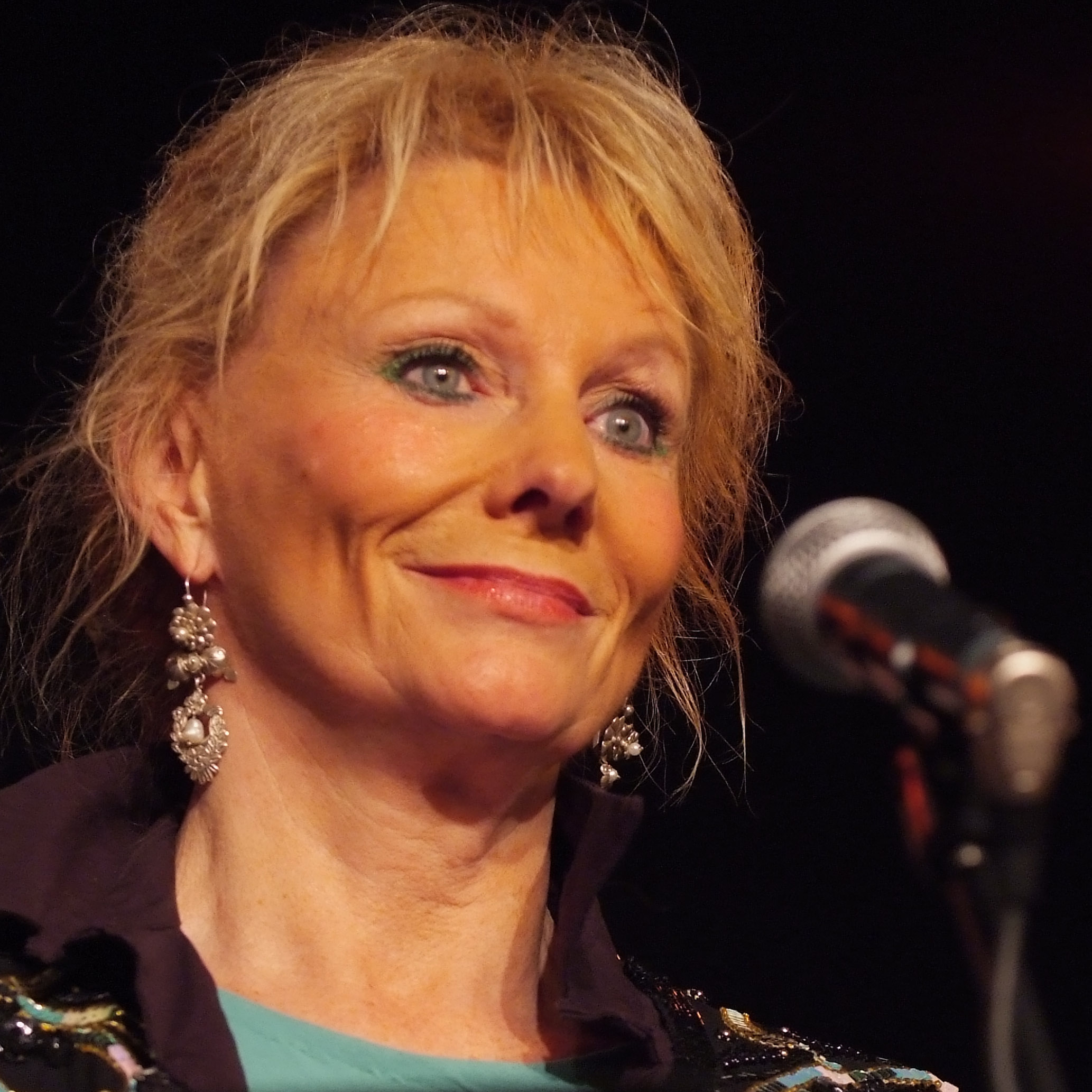
- Born: 19 November 1945 (age 79); Tórshavn, Faroe Islands
- Occupation(s): Singer; Actress

Annika Hoydal (born 19 November 1945) is a Faroese singer and actress. Hoydal was a contestant for the 1979 Dansk Melodi Grand Prix and was nominated for the 2016 Faroese Music Awards.

== The Hoydal family ==
The family name Hoydal takes name after a neighbourhood in Tórshavn named Hoydalar, it is in a valley near Hoyvík. Faroese writer and politician Karsten Hoydal (1912–1990) was born in Hoydalar. Karsten Hoydal and his wife Marie Louise Falk-Rønne have four children: Annika Hoydal, Gunnar Hoydal, born 1941 is a writer, Kjartan Hoydal, born 1941 (Gunnar and Kjartan are twins) was secretary of the North East Atlantic Fisheries Commission (NEAFC) and is now director of sp/f Skrivarastova Fish and Film. They have another son called Egil. Høgni Hoydal, a politician is Kjartan Hoydal's son.
