= Den Sorte Skole =

- Origin: Copenhagen
- Genre: Plunderphonics
- Years active: 2004–present
- Members: Martin Højland; Simon Dokkedal
- Past members: Martin Fernando Jakobsen (2004–11)
- Website: densorteskole.net

Den Sorte Skole (English: "The Black School") is a Copenhagen-based DJ, producer, and composer collective, known for creating music using diverse samples. They were formed in 2004 by Simon Dokkedal, Martin Højland, and Martin Fernando Jakobsen, who has been on leave since 2011. The group's work has been described as creating "sample symphonies".

== History ==
Den Sorte Skole started out as a hip-hop and reggae DJ crew. He soon became the Danish frontrunner practicing the concept of mash-up DJing. They gathered a large following in Denmark by making surprising blends of legends like Neil Young with Dj Premier and Janis Joplin with Dj Format live on turntables. This resulted in their first release – the mixtape, Lektion No. 1 from 2006.

Three years later, Lektion No. 1 was followed by Lektion No. 2 from 2008 – a more complex mix of vinyl samples gathered from a much more genre-diverse group of music. Anatolian progressive rock, British horror movie soundtracks, and forgotten Danish folk tunes came together with dark hip-hop beats and explosive thunderclaps from early dub-step and drum'n'bass. Though still a mixtape, Lektion No. 2 became the best-reviewed release in Denmark in 2008 and Den Sorte Skole went on several sold-out tours.

In January 2010 Roskilde Festival challenged the Den Sorte Skole to create an anniversary concert celebrating the festival's 40-year history from 1971 to 2010. They undertook the task with great awe and humility and spent months digging through Roskilde's vast musical catalogue. The result was a massive 2-hour celebration with 30,000 people that was hailed in the leading Danish daily Politiken as "a demonstration of the historical superiority of the Roskilde Festival containing both legends and the diversity of shifts in musical expression through the years past".

== Lektion III ==
Thousands of samples lifted off more than 250 old vinyl records from 51 countries on six continents. Two years of work followed by a failed attempt to clear the samples with IFPI Denmark.

This is the background to Copenhagen duo Den Sorte Skole's album Lektion III. A 1.5-hour long musical odyssey that blends elements from Moroccan traditional songs, Indian hymns, and field recordings of Cameroonian Pygmies to forgotten Yugoslav psych, French avant-garde noise, and early German electro into a dark and giddy trip through musical history and beyond.

The album juxtaposes samples from different genres and periods, combining recordings of Indian tabla players with German synthesizer pioneers, Iraqi oud players with French percussionists, and Indonesian singers with voodoo preachers from the Bahamas.

"It's been a long time since the idea of an artist sampling another's work could be considered shocking or transgressive", Canadian RVA Magazine wrote in their review. Den Sorte Skole's work could. They have sampled the whole world and managed to avoid the clichés of forced cultural crossings. They have made a sample-based album without focusing on beats, distinguishing it from most sample-based music. To put it simply – Den Sorte Skole made an album from samples, but you can't hear that! Isolated elements from old records from around the globe are merged like they were destined to meet. Their music simply subsumes its component elements into a cohesive whole with the greatest of ease.

Due to their unsuccessfully attempt to clear the samples with IFPI Denmark, Lektion III can't be sold on iTunes, Boomkat etc. but is now available as a free – and 'illegal' – download from their website. With the album comes a 40-page booklet going into depth with the artists they have sampled on Lektion III, the process of making it, and the legal and musical context it was made.

Lektion No. 3 was released on 22 April 2013.

== Lektion No. 2 ==
Lektion No. 2 was released in May 2008. This 65-minute mixtape was created from more than 400 vinyl samples, ranging from the Spanish International Brigades, British soft porn soundtracks, and Turkish women's liberation anthems to rap legends and doom boom from the deep eighties. "Lektion #2″ was the best reviewed Danish release in 2008.

== Lektion No. 1 ==
In February 2006, Den Sorte Skole released their first full-length mixtape. A 74 LP mix recorded on four turntables and three mixers with an overall idea to bring together artists stretching from Neil Young and Janis Joplin over Company Flow to Afrika Bambaataa. "Lektion # 1" was awarded "Best Danish Hip Hop album of 2006" by the leading Hip Hop magazine in Denmark.
