= Lív Næs =

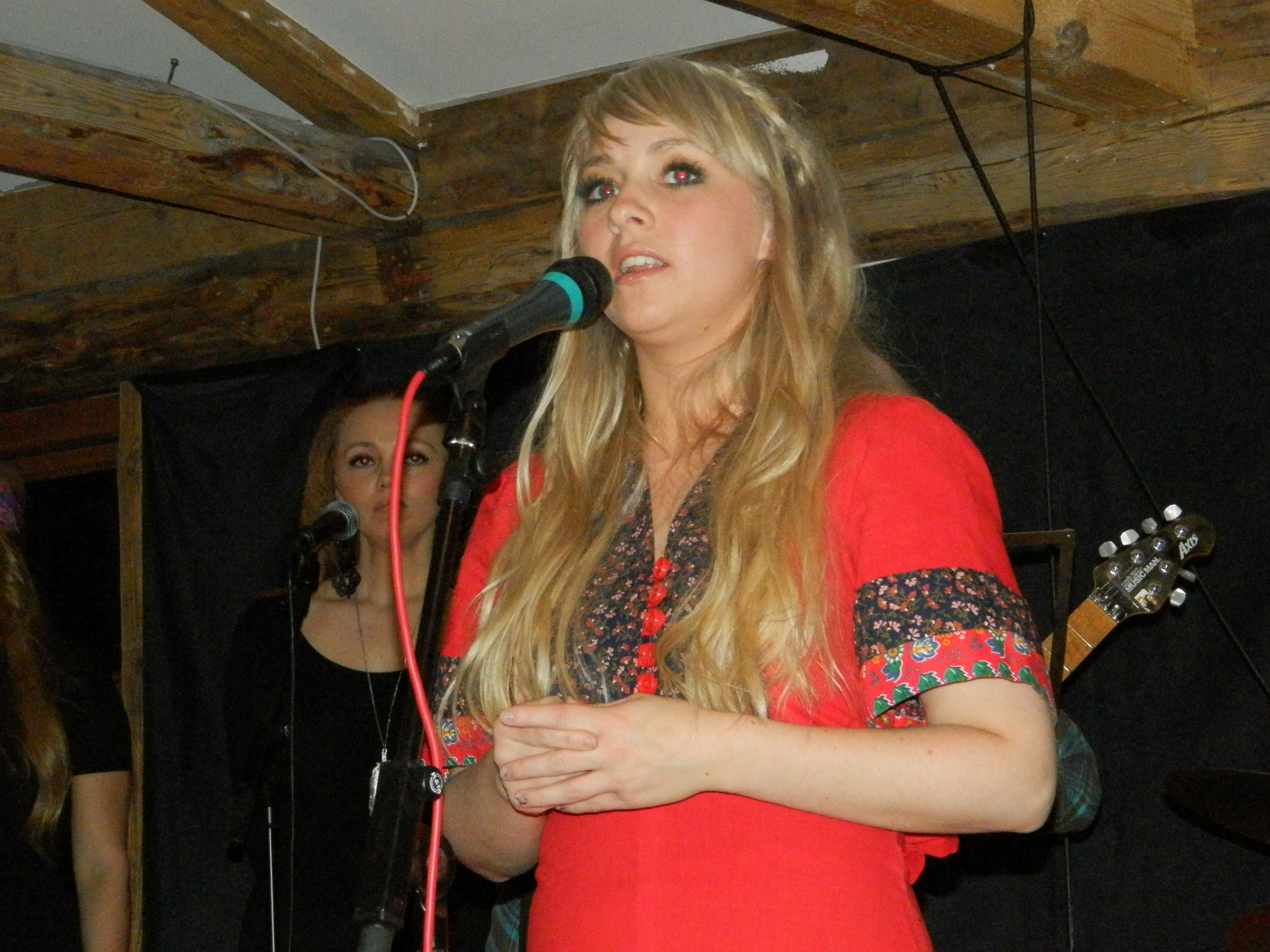
- Næs in 2013

Background information
- Born: 1988 (age 36–37)
- Origin: Faroe Islands
- Genres: Folk
- Occupation: Singer-songwriter

Lív Næs (born 1988) is a Faroese singer-songwriter and musician. With her partner Tróndur Enni, the duo play Faroese folk-music with a soft pop vein. They have released several albums and singles, including the 2012 album Keldufar, featuring fairytale poetry from her grandfather Johannes Andreas Næs. In 2014 she performed at the Sørvágs Country & Blues Festival. She was a finalist representing Denmark in the 77th Eurovision Memories Contest in Hannover with the song "Grind", and finished 6th.
