= Brothers Moving =

Danish-American musical group

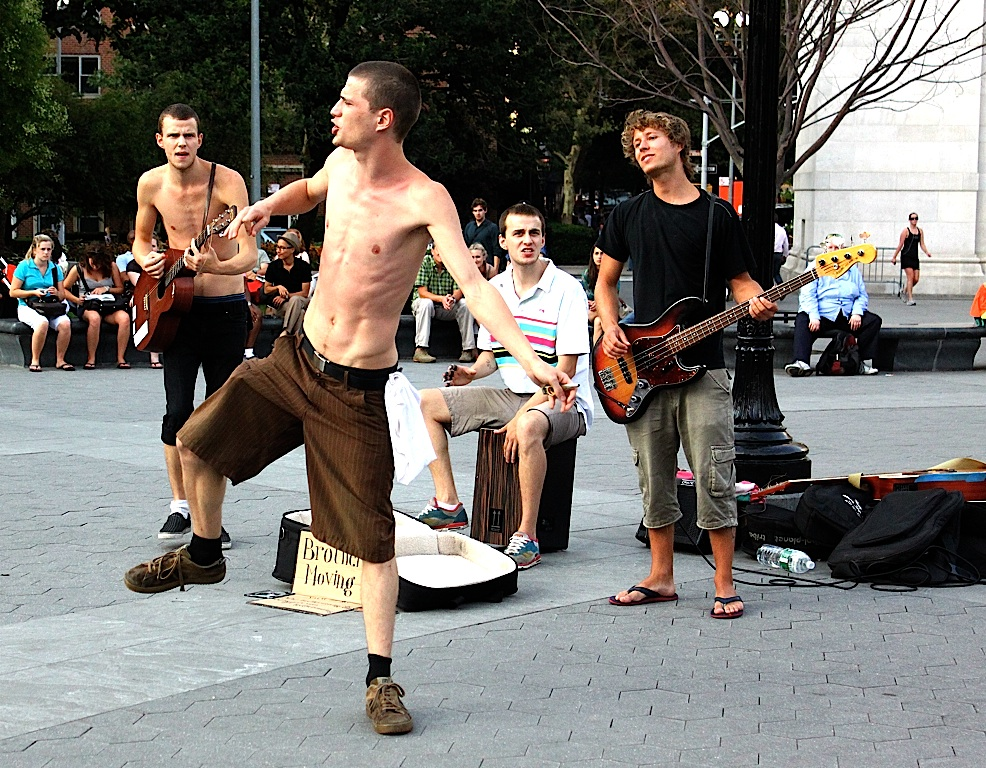
- Brothers Moving during a street performance in Washington Square Park, NY in 2009

Background information
- Origin: Djursland, Denmark & New York City, NY
- Genres: Blues, folk, funk, reggae, rock'n'roll
- Years active: 2008–present
- Members: Esben Knoblauch; Nils Sørensen; Mathias Warny; Collin DeJoseph
- Past members: Simon Knoblauch; Aske Knoblauch; Cyron Melville; Lennart Brian Kiel
- Website: www.brothersmoving.net

Brothers Moving is a Danish band formed in New York City in 2008 by brothers Esben Knoblauch (lead vocal, guitar, kazoo), Aske Knoblauch (lead guitar) and Simon Knoblauch (cajón) along with Nils Sørensen (bass). The quartet is known for mixing genres and singing in both English and Danish, and their musical style is inspired by blues, funk, reggae, folk and early rock and roll.

== Career ==
While Brothers Moving stuck to their roots and independence as street musicians, they quickly began gigging regularly in smaller clubs, at private parties and at fashion events in and around New York City.

In 2009 they passed auditions for the MUNY (Music Under New York) membership.

Although Brothers Moving received little attention in their home country, the band's popularity has grown in other places. This is in large part due to a video filmed on a cellphone by a spectator in Union Square, NY, which captured the band performing the Cab Calloway classic "Minnie the Moocher" during one of their street sets. In 2016 they headlined their debut concerts in Moscow and Saint Petersburg, which appeared to sell out and were well received by the public. Later that same year, Brothers Moving also performed at Fusion Festival in Germany, and at Stereoleto Festival in Saint Petersburg.

Brothers Moving's self-titled debut album was recorded in the spring of 2012, and released independently on July 18, 2012. The album contained mainly songs from their street set, along with a few original compositions.

They have continued to release singles and albums, releasing their second album, Autonomy, in 2018, and a single, "Keep on talking to yourself," in 2020.

== Members ==
- Esben Knoblauch – lead vocals, rhythm guitar, kazoo, backing vocals (Aug 2008–present)
- Nils Sørensen – bass, harmonica, backing vocals (Aug 2008–present)
- Collin DeJoseph – piano, backing vocals (Sept 2022–present)
- Mathias Warns Røhl – drums, backing vocals (Sept 2022–present)

Former members

- Aske Knoblauch – lead guitar, lead vocals, backing vocals (Aug 2008–Sept 2022)
- Simon Knoblauch – cajón, backing vocals (Aug 2008–Jan 2010; Jan 2012–Feb 2013; July 2016–Jan 2019)
- Cyron Melville – drums (Feb 2019–Dec 2019)
- Lennart Brian Kiel – drums (Dec 2019–Dec 2020)

Touring musicians

- Johannes Bohn Christensen – drums (Jan 2021–present)

Former touring musicians

- Bram Kincheloe – cajón (Nov 2009–Dec 2010)
- Thomas Biilman – cajón (Mar 2013–Oct 2013)
- Collin DeJoseph – cajón, backing vocals (Jul 2014–Jul 2016); piano, backing vocals (Jul 2016–Sept 2022)
- Pil Knoblauch – cajón, backing vocals (Sept 2016–Jan 2019)
- Lennart Brian Kiel – drums, backing vocals (Feb 2019–Dec 2019)
- Mathias Warny Røhl – drums, backing vocals (Jan 2021–Sept 2022)

== Discography ==
=== Studio albums ===
- 2012: Brothers Moving (self-released)
- 2018: Autonomy (self-released)

=== Live releases ===
- 2008: Live @ Hudson River (currently unavailable)
- 2009: Live @ Roots Cafe (currently unavailable)

=== EPs and singles ===
- 2012: Sorte Sigøjner (self-released)
- 2012: Train (self-released)
- 2020: Keep on Talking to Yourself (self-released)
- 2020: To Feel Alive (self-released)
- 2021: Minnie the Moocher (self-released)
- 2021: Tea Room Sessions (self-released)
- 2022: Choppin’ (self-released)
- 2022: Pickin’ (self-released)
- 2024: Strummin’ (self-released)
