= Hamferð =

Faroese doom metal band

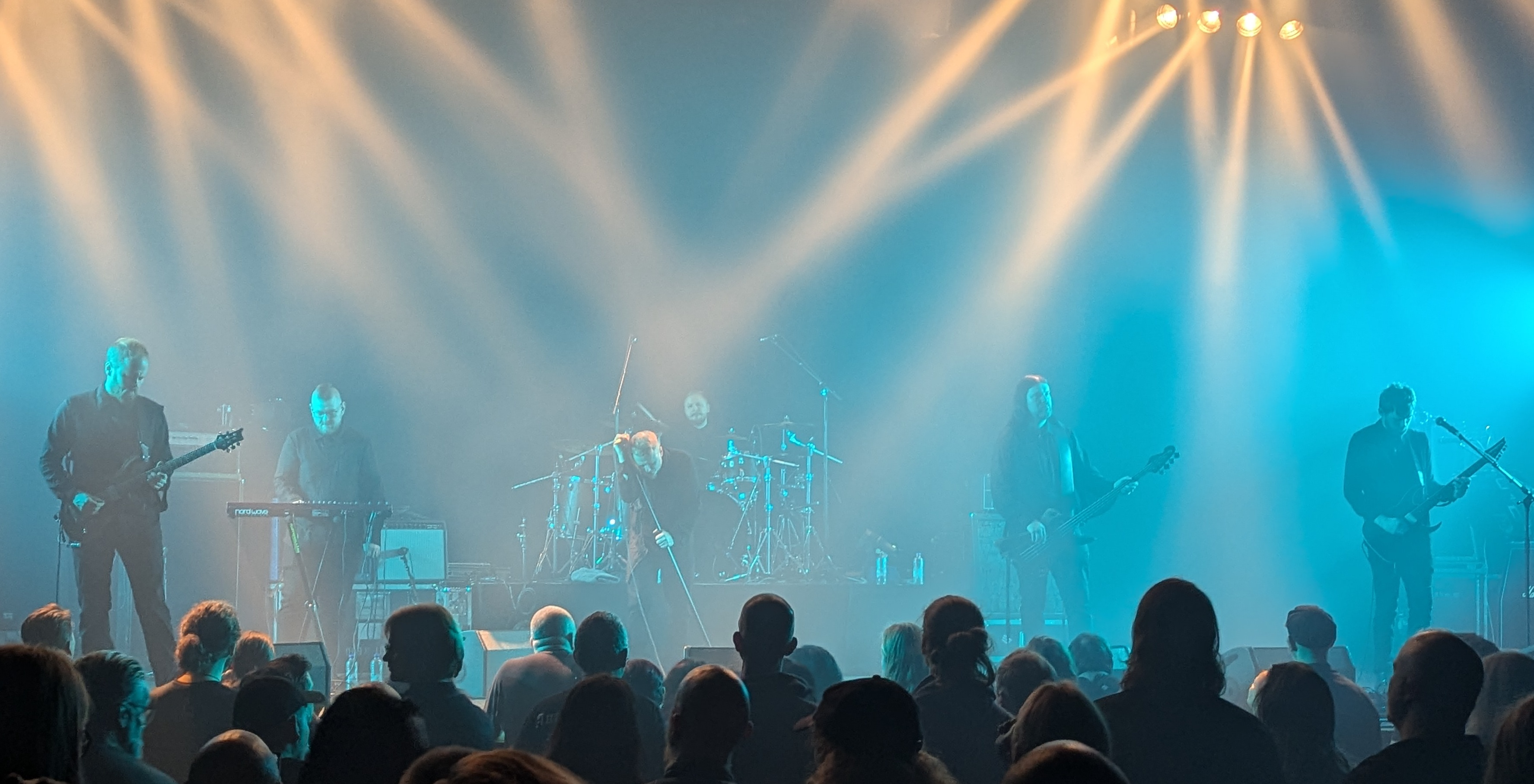
- Hamferð performing in 2024

Background information
- Origin: Tórshavn, Faroe Islands
- Genres: Doom metal, death-doom
- Years active: 2008−present
- Labels: Tutl Records
- Members: Eyðun í Geil Hvannastein; Theodor Kapnas; Esmar Joensen; Jón Aldará; Jenus í Trøðini; Remi Kofoed Johannesen
- Past members: Tinna Tótudóttir; Ísak Petersen; John Áki Egholm
- Website: hamferd.com/bio

Hamferð is a Faroese doom metal band from Tórshavn, formed in 2008.

== History ==
John Egholm (guitar) founded the band in 2008; he called Remi Johannesen (drums) and they started jamming. The first show was in a band competition called GBOB (Global Battle of the Bands) and Hamferð actually reached the national final of the competition. Meanwhile, Theodor Kapnas (guitar), who was studying audio engineering in Sweden, joined the band and most of the writing happened online. At that time Hamferð were joined by current keyboard member Esmar Joensen to complete the lineup. During fall of 2009 Hamferð recorded their first demo, containing the tracks "Opið Hav" and "Ódn" and, in January 2010, joined another band competition in the Faroe Islands called Sement. Theodor, Tinna, and Jón were all abroad. Consequently, John handled the vocals and two stand-in members were chosen: Harald í Kálvalíð (guitar) and Jenus í Trøðini (bass).

During summer 2010 Hamferð appeared on several well-known festivals in the Faroe Islands, including Summarfestivalurin and the G! Festival. Shortly after their concerts on both festivals Kerrang! critiqued their performances and handed them an impressive 4 out of 5 stars.

After parting ways with Tinna Tótudóttir (replaced by Jenus í Trøðini) in November/December 2011, Hamferð supported the Dead Tyrants European Tour, including Finnish pagan metal band Moonsorrow and Faroese folk metal band Týr. In December 2011, Jón Aldará stated that the band was concentrating on writing new music for its first full-length album. The album, Evst, was eventaually released in 2013. On 24 March 2012, the band won the Faroese edition of Wacken Metal Battle, getting the chance to play at Wacken Open Air 2012. On 3 August 2012, the band won even this competition, getting also a worldwide record deal with the German label Nuclear Blast.

In December 2012 Hamferð won a Faroese music prize at the annual Planet Awards in the category Band of the Year. Two years earlier Hamferð won a Planet Award in the category Best new band of the year Hamferðs' main influence is said to be the Faroe Islands themselves, "where the sea and the long cold winter play the major role as main contributors."

In early January 2014, lead singer Jón Aldará also joined the Finnish band Barren Earth – replacing former vocalist and founder Mikko Kotamäki, who had parted ways with the band "due to conflicting schedules."

== Members ==
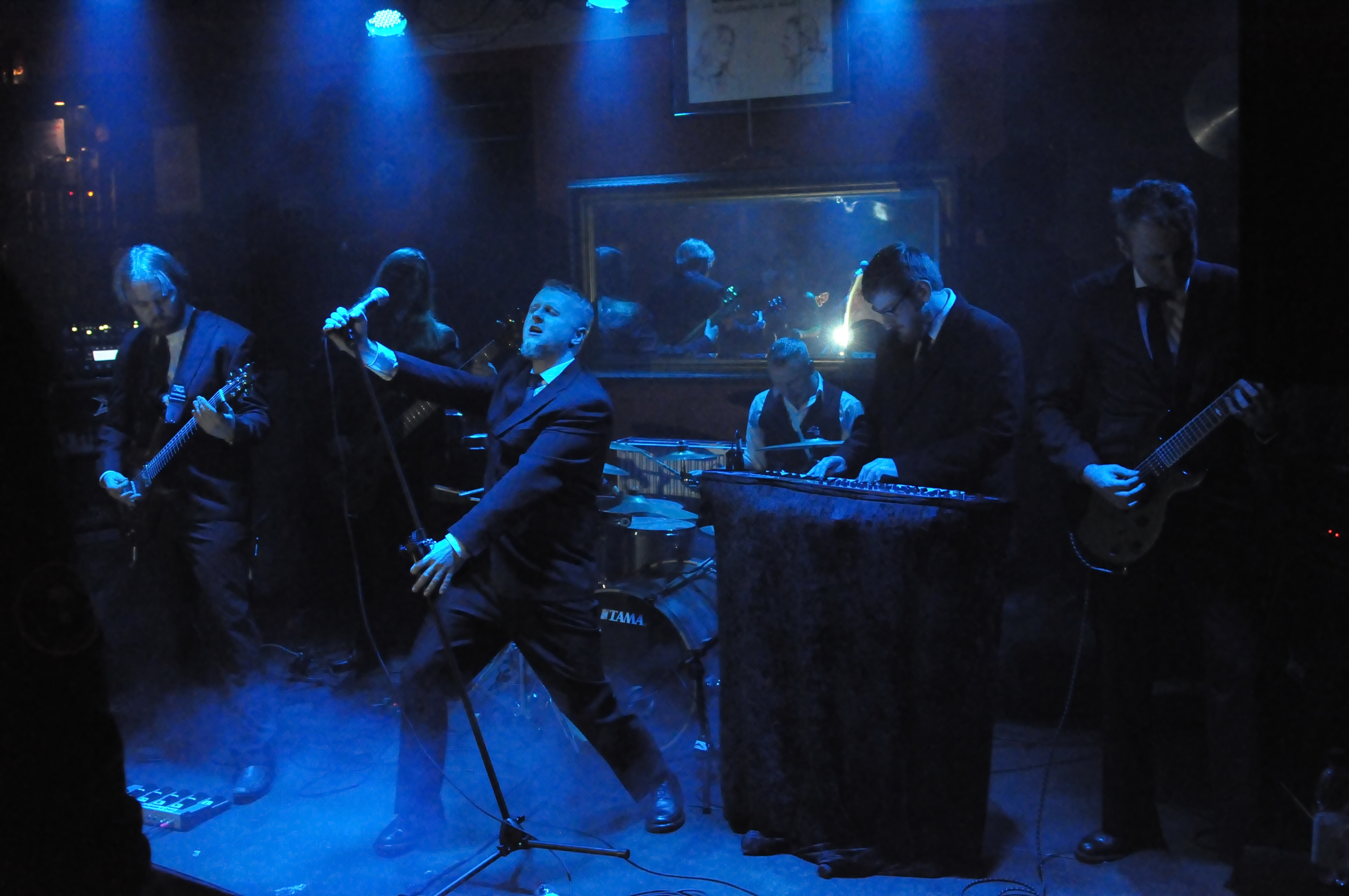
Hamferð performing in 2014

=== Current members ===
- Jón Aldará – vocals (2008–present)
- Eyðun í Geil Hvannastein – guitars (2020–present)
- Theodor Kapnas – guitars (2009–present)
- Esmar Joensen – keyboards (2009–present)
- Ísak Petersen – bass (2014–present)
- Remi Kofoed Johannesen – drums (2008–present)

=== Former members ===
- Tinna Tótudóttir – bass (2008–2011)
- Jenus Í Trøðini – bass (2011–2014)
- John Áki Egholm – guitars (2008–2020)

== Discography ==
- Vilst er síðsta fet (2010)
- Evst (2013)
- Támsins likam (2018)
- Men Guðs hond er sterk (2024)
