= Høgni Lisberg =

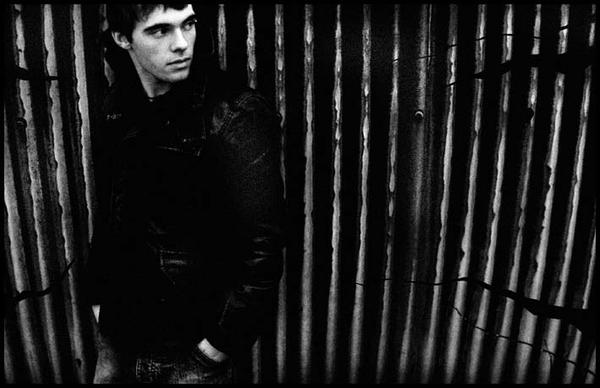

Background information
- Born: Høgni Lisberg; 7 June 1982 (age 43); Tórshavn, Faroe Islands
- Genres: Indie rock, Alternative rock
- Years active: 1998–present
- Labels: Mahogni Music Tutl
- Website: HOGNI.COM

Høgni Lisberg (born 7 June 1982) is a Faroese musician.

== Band and personal history ==
Høgni was born in 1982 and is son of Sørin Lisberg and Hallbjørg Eliassen. His father is son of Knút Lisberg, who is cousin to Jens Olivur Lisberg (1896–1920) where his great-grandfather, and thus Jens Olivurs uncle, lived Johan í Smiðjuni. Høgni lived together with his two younger sisters in Leirvík, where he grew up. He moved to Copenhagen in 2004.

Høgni Lisberg, also known from ethno-rock band Clickhaze fame, released his first solo album, Most Beautiful Things in 2003. The album reached number 2 on Tutl Records’ sales charts on the Faroe Islands. This led Høgni to huge success in both his home country and in Switzerland, where the press gave him a lot of publicity during his Switzerland tour in 2004. In 2005 Høgni played at the Danish Nibe Festival, the exclusive Faroese bi-yearly showcase Atlantic Music Event, and the largest music festival on the Faroe Islands, the G! Festival. Between 2006-2011 Høgni toured and played at SXSW, Midem, Roskilde Festival, Iceland Airwaves, Italia Wave Love Festival, as well as warming up for Badly Drawn Boy and Paolo Nutini.

== Releases ==
Høgni's first solo album Most Beautiful Things was released in 2003, only a year after his previous unit Clickhaze was dissolved.

In 2006, Høgni released the album Morning Dew. The album was recorded at the renowned Lundgaard Studios in Denmark by ex-Clickhaze bass player Jens L. Thomsen, and mixed by Óli Poulsen.

In 2008, the album "Haré! Haré!" was released. The song "Bow Down" is featured in the video games NBA 2K11 and NBA 2K16. The song was also used for a nationwide TV spot in the U.S. for US Open tennis in 2012. The songs "Big Personality" and "Soul Company" were both played during episodes in the fourth season of MTV reality series, Jersey Shore (TV series).

In 2012 the album "Con Man" was released. The single "Under Streetlights" was also released separately with a music video.

In 2013 the self-titled EP "HOGNI" was released. The EP contains four songs, all sung in Faroese.

On September 22, 2014 the album "Call for a Revolution" was released.

On December 2, 2019 the single "The Lady of Mocksby" was released. Throughout 2020, five singles were released which would all later be featured in the album "Within a Man" on August 14 that year.

== Discography ==
=== With Clickhaze ===
- "EP" (2002)

=== Solo releases ===
- "Most Beautiful Things" (2003)
- "Morning Dew" (2006)
- "Haré! Haré!" (2008)
- "Under Streetlights" (single) (2012)
- "Con Man" (2012)
- "HOGNI" (EP) (2013)
- "Call for a Revolution" (2014)
- "Within a Man" (2020)
