= 2001 in the Faroe Islands =

- Decades: 1980s; 1990s; 2000s; 2010s; 2020s
- See also: History of the Faroe Islands; Timeline of Faroese history; List of years in the Faroe Islands

Events in the year 2001 in the Faroe Islands.

== Incumbents ==
- Monarch – Margrethe II
- High Commissioner – Vibeke Larsen (until 1 November); Birgit Kleis onwards
- Prime Minister – Anfinn Kallsberg

== Events ==
- A planned independence referendum is cancelled when Denmark states it would result in a sudden halt in Danish subsidies.

== Sports ==
- 2001 Faroe Islands Cup
