= 2024 in the Faroe Islands =

- Decades: 2000s; 2010s; 2020s
- See also: History of the Faroe Islands; Timeline of Faroese history; List of years in the Faroe Islands

Events in the year 2024 in the Faroe Islands.

== Incumbents ==
- Monarch – Margrethe II (until 14 January), Frederik X
- High Commissioner – Lene Moyell Johansen
- Prime Minister – Aksel V. Johannesen

== Holidays ==
- 1 January – New Year's Day
- 28 March – Maundy Thursday
- 29 March – Good Friday
- 31 March – Easter Sunday
- 1 April – Easter Monday
- 25 April – Flag Day
- 26 April – Day of Prayer
- 9 May – Feast of the Ascension
- 19 May – Pentecost
- 20 May – Whit Monday
- 5 June – Constitution Day
- 28 July – St. Olaf's Eve
- 29 July – St. Olaf's Day
- 24 December – Christmas Eve
- 25 December – Christmas Day
- 26 December – Boxing Day
- 31 December – New Year's Eve

== Sports ==
- 2024 Faroe Islands Premier League

== Deaths ==
- 20 February – Anfinn Kallsberg, 76, politician, prime minister (1998–2004).
- 8 July – Jógvan Sundstein, 91, politician, prime minister (1989–1991).
- 7 August – Lisbeth L. Petersen, 85, politician, member of the Løgting (1990–2008) and Folketing (2001–2005).
