= 2002 in the Faroe Islands =

- Decades: 1980s; 1990s; 2000s; 2010s; 2020s
- See also: History of the Faroe Islands; Timeline of Faroese history; List of years in the Faroe Islands

Events in the year 2002 in the Faroe Islands.

== Incumbents ==
- Monarch – Margrethe II
- High Commissioner – Birgit Kleis
- Prime Minister – Anfinn Kallsberg

== Events ==
- 30 April – 2002 Faroese general election.
- The G! Festival is held for the first time.

== Sports ==
- 2002 Faroe Islands Cup
