= 2021 in the Faroe Islands =

- Decades: 2000s; 2010s; 2020s
- See also: History of the Faroe Islands; Timeline of Faroese history; List of years in the Faroe Islands

Events in the year 2021 in the Faroe Islands.

== Incumbents ==
- Monarch – Margrethe II
- High Commissioner – Lene Moyell Johansen
- Prime Minister – Bárður á Steig Nielsen

== Events ==
Ongoing: COVID-19 pandemic in the Faroe Islands

=== April ===
- 6 April – The general cargo ship MV Hellutangi was beached by a storm in Faroe Islands waters, and was discovered on Vagar island.

== Sports ==
- 24 August – 5 September: Faroe Islands at the 2020 Summer Paralympics
- 2021 Faroe Islands Cup
