= 2012 in the Faroe Islands =

- Decades: 1990s; 2000s; 2010s; 2020s
- See also: History of the Faroe Islands; Timeline of Faroese history; List of years in the Faroe Islands

Events in the year 2012 in the Faroe Islands.

== Incumbents ==
- Monarch – Margrethe II
- High Commissioner – Dan M. Knudsen
- Prime Minister – Kaj Leo Johannesen

== Events ==
- The Geytin film festival is established.
- 3 May: 2012 Faroese municipal merger referendum

== Sports ==
- FC Hoyvík, plays their first season in the Faroese Football League.
