= 2008 in the Faroe Islands =

- Decades: 1980s; 1990s; 2000s; 2010s; 2020s
- See also: History of the Faroe Islands; Timeline of Faroese history; List of years in the Faroe Islands

Events in the year 2008 in the Faroe Islands.

== Incumbents ==
- Monarch – Margrethe II
- High Commissioner – Dan M. Knudsen
- Prime Minister – Jóannes Eidesgaard (until 26 September), Kaj Leo Johannesen (from 26 September)

== Events ==
- 19 January – 2008 Faroese general election

== Sports ==
- 15 March – 14 July: 2008 Faroe Islands Cup
