= 2027 in the Faroe Islands =

- Decades: 2000s; 2010s; 2020s
- See also: History of the Faroe Islands; Timeline of Faroese history; List of years in the Faroe Islands

Events in the year 2027 in the Faroe Islands.

== Events ==
=== Predicted and scheduled ===
- 3–9 July – 2027 Island Games

== Holidays ==
- 1 January – New Year's Day
- 25 March – Maundy Thursday
- 26 March – Good Friday
- 28 March – Easter Sunday
- 29 March – Easter Monday
- 23 April – Day of Prayer
- 25 April – Flag Day
- 6 May – Feast of the Ascension
- 16 May – Pentecost
- 17 May – Whit Monday
- 5 June – Constitution Day
- 28 July – St. Olaf's Eve
- 29 July – St. Olaf's Day
- 24 December – Christmas Eve
- 25 December – Christmas Day
- 26 December – Boxing Day
- 31 December – New Year's Eve
