= 2005 in the Faroe Islands =

- Decades: 1980s; 1990s; 2000s; 2010s; 2020s
- See also: History of the Faroe Islands; Timeline of Faroese history; List of years in the Faroe Islands

Events in the year 2005 in the Faroe Islands.

== Incumbents ==
- Monarch – Margrethe II
- High Commissioner – Birgit Kleis (until 1 August); Søren Christensen onwards
- Prime Minister – Jóannes Eidesgaard

== Events ==
- 31 August – The Hoyvík Agreement with Iceland comes into effect.
- The Centre of Maritime Studies and Engineering is established.

== Sports ==
- 15 March – 14 July: 2005 Faroe Islands Cup
