= 2026 in the Faroe Islands =

- Decades: 2000s; 2010s; 2020s
- See also: History of the Faroe Islands; Timeline of Faroese history; List of years in the Faroe Islands

Events in the year 2026 in the Faroe Islands.

== Incumbents ==
- Monarch – Frederik X
- High Commissioner – Lene Moyell Johansen
- Prime Minister – Aksel V. Johannesen

== Events ==
- 26 March – 2026 Faroese general election.

=== Predicted and scheduled ===
- 12 August – A total solar eclipse is predicted to occur at the Moon's descending node of the orbit in North America and Europe. The total eclipse will pass over the Arctic, Greenland, Iceland, the Atlantic Ocean, northeastern Portugal and northern Spain. It will also partly pass over the Faroe Islands.

== Holidays ==
- 1 January – New Year's Day
- 2 April – Maundy Thursday
- 3 April – Good Friday
- 5 April – Easter Sunday
- 6 April – Easter Monday
- 25 April – Flag Day
- 1 May – Day of Prayer
- 14 May – Feast of the Ascension
- 24 May – Pentecost
- 25 May – Whit Monday
- 5 June – Constitution Day
- 28 July – St. Olaf's Eve
- 29 July – St. Olaf's Day
- 24 December – Christmas Eve
- 25 December – Christmas Day
- 26 December – Boxing Day
- 31 December – New Year's Eve

== Sports ==
- 2026 Faroe Islands Premier League
