= 2006 in the Faroe Islands =

- Decades: 1980s; 1990s; 2000s; 2010s; 2020s
- See also: History of the Faroe Islands; Timeline of Faroese history; List of years in the Faroe Islands

Events in the year 2006 in the Faroe Islands.

== Incumbents ==
- Monarch – Margrethe II
- High Commissioner – Søren Christensen
- Prime Minister – Jóannes Eidesgaard

== Events ==
- 18 January – Undrið FF was founded in Tórshavn.
- The Samtak national Trade union federation was established.
- The Norðoyatunnilin officially opened.

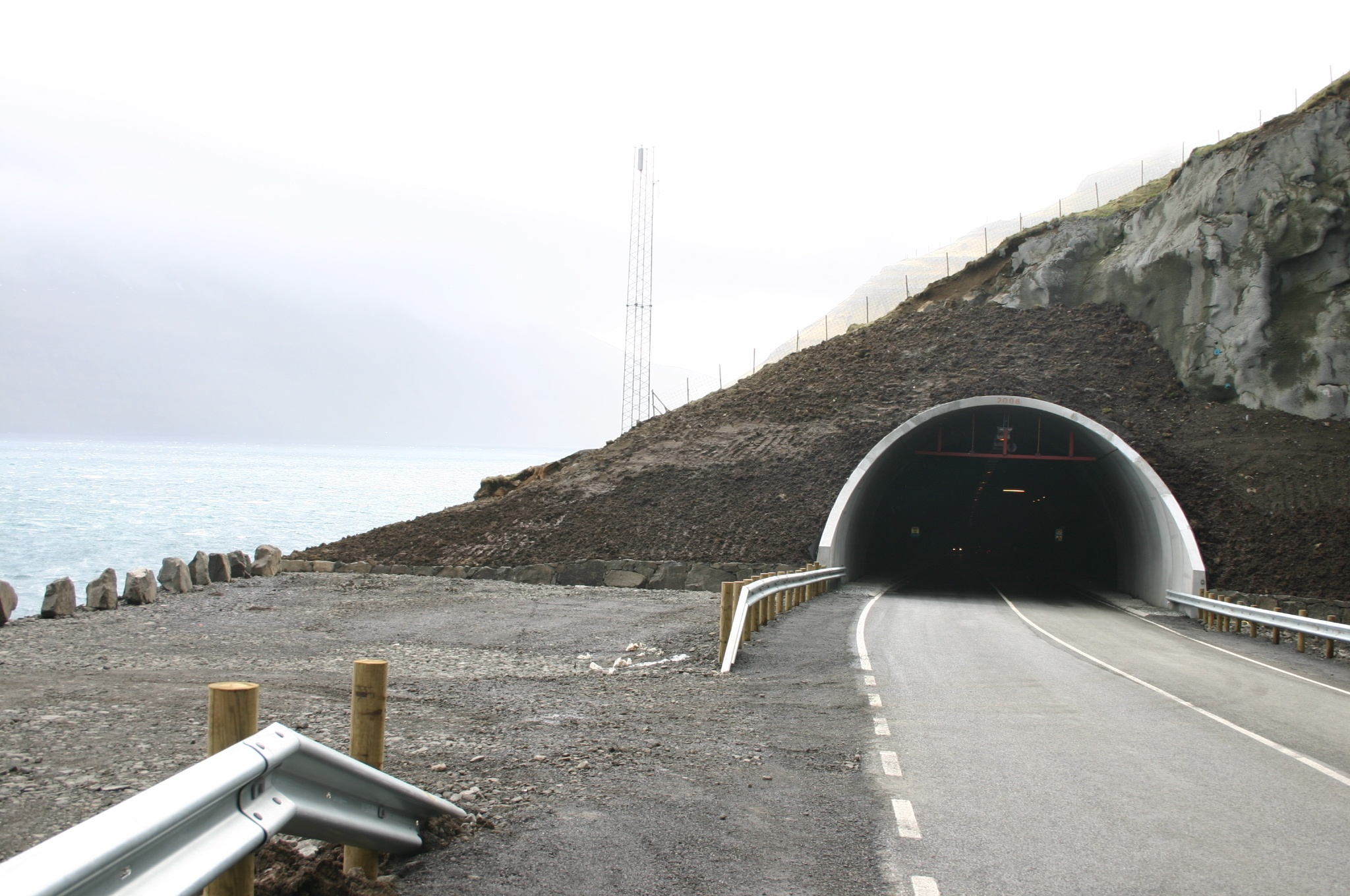
Norðoyatunnilin

== Sports ==
- 15 March – 14 July: 2006 Faroe Islands Cup
