= 2022 in the Faroe Islands =

- Decades: 2000s; 2010s; 2020s
- See also: History of the Faroe Islands; Timeline of Faroese history; List of years in the Faroe Islands

Events in the year 2022 in the Faroe Islands.

== Incumbents ==
- Monarch – Margrethe II
- High Commissioner – Lene Moyell Johansen
- Prime Minister – Bárður á Steig Nielsen (until 22 December), Aksel V. Johannesen (from 22 December)

== Events ==
=== April ===
- 31 October – 2022 Danish general election (Faroese constituency only)
- 8 December – 2022 Faroese general election

== Sports ==
- 5 March – 22 October: 2022 Faroe Islands Premier League
