= 2014 in the Faroe Islands =

- Decades: 1990s; 2000s; 2010s; 2020s
- See also: History of the Faroe Islands; Timeline of Faroese history; List of years in the Faroe Islands

Events in the year 2014 in the Faroe Islands.

== Incumbents ==
- Monarch – Margrethe II
- High Commissioner – Dan M. Knudsen
- Prime Minister – Kaj Leo Johannesen

== Sports ==
- 2014 Faroe Islands Cup
- 2014 Faroe Islands Premier League
