= 2019 in the Faroe Islands =

- Decades: 1990s; 2000s; 2010s; 2020s
- See also: History of the Faroe Islands; Timeline of Faroese history; List of years in the Faroe Islands

Events in the year 2019 in the Faroe Islands.

== Incumbents ==
- Monarch – Margrethe II
- High Commissioner – Lene Moyell Johansen
- Prime Minister – Aksel V. Johannesen (until 16 September), Bárður á Steig Nielsen (from 16 September)

== Events ==
- 5 June – 2019 Danish general election
- 31 August – 2019 Faroese general election

== Sports ==
- 19 March – 26 October: 2019 Faroe Islands Premier League
