= 2025 in the Faroe Islands =

- Decades: 2000s; 2010s; 2020s
- See also: History of the Faroe Islands; Timeline of Faroese history; List of years in the Faroe Islands

Events in the year 2025 in the Faroe Islands.

== Incumbents ==
- Monarch – Frederik X
- High Commissioner – Lene Moyell Johansen
- Prime Minister – Aksel V. Johannesen

== Events ==
- 4–16 May – 2025 UEFA Women's Under-17 Championship
- 4 December – The Løgting votes 17–16 to legalize abortion up to the end of the 12th week of pregnancy.

== Holidays ==
- 1 January – New Year's Day
- 28 March – Maundy Thursday
- 18 April – Good Friday
- 20 April – Easter Sunday
- 21 April – Easter Monday
- 25 April – Flag Day
- 16 May – Day of Prayer
- 29 May – Feast of the Ascension
- 5 June – Constitution Day
- 8 June – Pentecost
- 9 June – Whit Monday
- 28 July – St. Olaf's Eve
- 29 July – St. Olaf's Day
- 24 December – Christmas Eve
- 25 December – Christmas Day
- 26 December – Boxing Day
- 31 December – New Year's Eve

== Sports ==
- 2025 Faroe Islands Premier League
