= 2016 in the Faroe Islands =

- Decades: 1990s; 2000s; 2010s; 2020s
- See also: History of the Faroe Islands; Timeline of Faroese history; List of years in the Faroe Islands

Events in the year 2016 in the Faroe Islands.

== Incumbents ==
- Monarch – Margrethe II
- High Commissioner – Dan M. Knudsen
- Prime Minister – Aksel V. Johannesen

== Sports ==
- 2016 Faroe Islands Cup
- Faroe Islands at the 2016 Summer Paralympics
- Suðuroy: Tvøroyrar Bóltfelag, FC Suðuroy and Royn Hvalba announce that they would merge, forming TB/FC Suðuroy/Royn.

== Deaths ==
- 3 January: Demmus Hentze, 92, politician, Finance Minister (1975–1981).
