= 2020 in the Faroe Islands =

- Decades: 2000s; 2010s; 2020s
- See also: History of the Faroe Islands; Timeline of Faroese history; List of years in the Faroe Islands

Events in the year 2020 in the Faroe Islands.

== Incumbents ==
- Monarch – Margrethe II
- High Commissioner – Lene Moyell Johansen
- Prime Minister – Bárður á Steig Nielsen

== Events ==
Ongoing: COVID-19 pandemic in the Faroe Islands

- 4 March – The first confirmed case of COVID-19 is reported in the Faroe Islands.
- 10 December – The Eysturoyartunnilin, a large undersea road tunnel under the Tangafjørður sound, connecting the island of Streymoy to the island of Eysturoy is opened.

== Sports ==
- 2020 Faroe Islands Cup
