= 2004 in the Faroe Islands =

- Decades: 1980s; 1990s; 2000s; 2010s; 2020s
- See also: History of the Faroe Islands; Timeline of Faroese history; List of years in the Faroe Islands

Events in the year 2004 in the Faroe Islands.

== Incumbents ==
- Monarch – Margrethe II
- High Commissioner – Birgit Kleis
- Prime Minister – Anfinn Kallsberg (until 3 February) Jóannes Eidesgaard onwards

== Events ==
- 20 January – 2004 Faroese general election.

== Sports ==
- 2004 Faroe Islands Cup
