= 2015 in the Faroe Islands =

- Decades: 1990s; 2000s; 2010s; 2020s
- See also: History of the Faroe Islands; Timeline of Faroese history; List of years in the Faroe Islands

Events in the year 2015 in the Faroe Islands.

== Incumbents ==
- Monarch – Margrethe II
- High Commissioner – Dan M. Knudsen
- Prime Minister – Kaj Leo Johannesen (until 15 September); Aksel V. Johannesen onwards

== Events ==
- 15 September: 2015 Faroese general election
  - The Cabinet of Aksel V. Johannesen is formed.

== Sports ==
- 2015 Faroe Islands Cup

== Deaths ==
- 20 May: Ebba Hentze, 84, writer.
