= 2018 in the Faroe Islands =

- Decades: 1990s; 2000s; 2010s; 2020s
- See also: History of the Faroe Islands; Timeline of Faroese history; List of years in the Faroe Islands

Events in the year 2018 in the Faroe Islands.

== Incumbents ==
- Monarch – Margrethe II
- High Commissioner – Lene Moyell Johansen
- Prime Minister – Aksel V. Johannesen

== Sports ==
- 2018 Faroe Islands Cup
