= Hov Dås =

Hill in Denmark containing barrows

Coordinates: 56°59′27″N 8°48′55″E

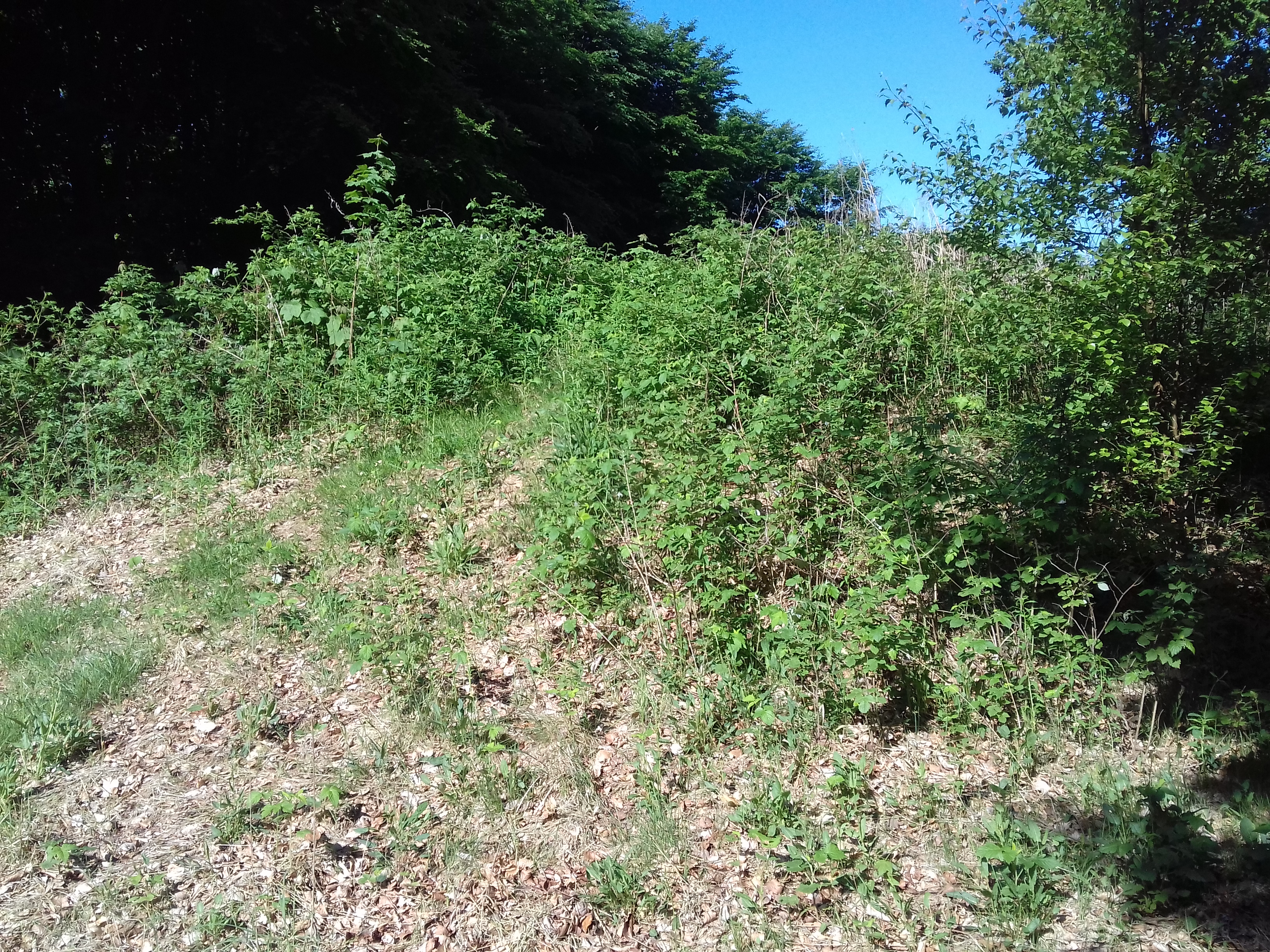
Inside the Hov Dås one can see this barrow (there are two barrows inside this area)

Hov Dås (before 1948 spelled Hov Daas) is a large hill in Denmark of prehistoric and bronze age interest because it contains a couple of long barrows type of bronze and prehistoric burial types, and tumulus on top. It is situated in Jutland, in the community of Thisted. It is 54 m wide and 3 m high.

In contemporary times, Hov Dås hill is used for grundlovsmøder by the Danes, which are meetings every year on 5 June to celebrate free speech and the constitution day of democracy in Denmark.
