= Josty =

Building in Copenhagen, Denmark

Coordinates: 55.6737°N 12.53°E

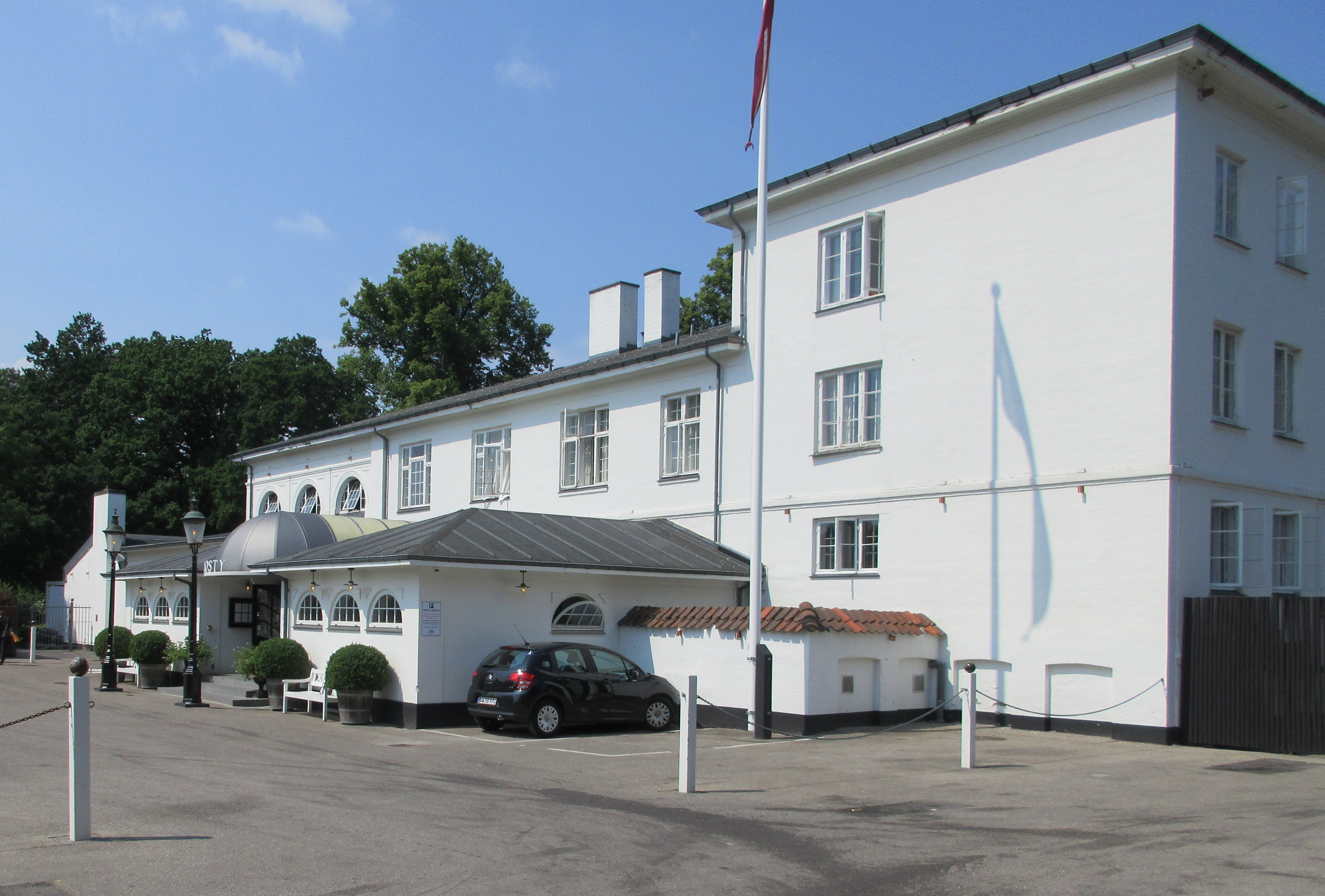
Josty in 2016

Josty is a historic restaurant venue situated inside Frederiksberg Gardens, off Pile Allé, in the Frederiksberg district of Copenhagen, Denmark. It is now mainly operated as an event venue but also has a small number of hotel rooms and operates a café on the Veranda facing the park in the summer time. The current building is from 1899 but the place traces its history back to a pastry café which opened at the site in 1824.

== History ==
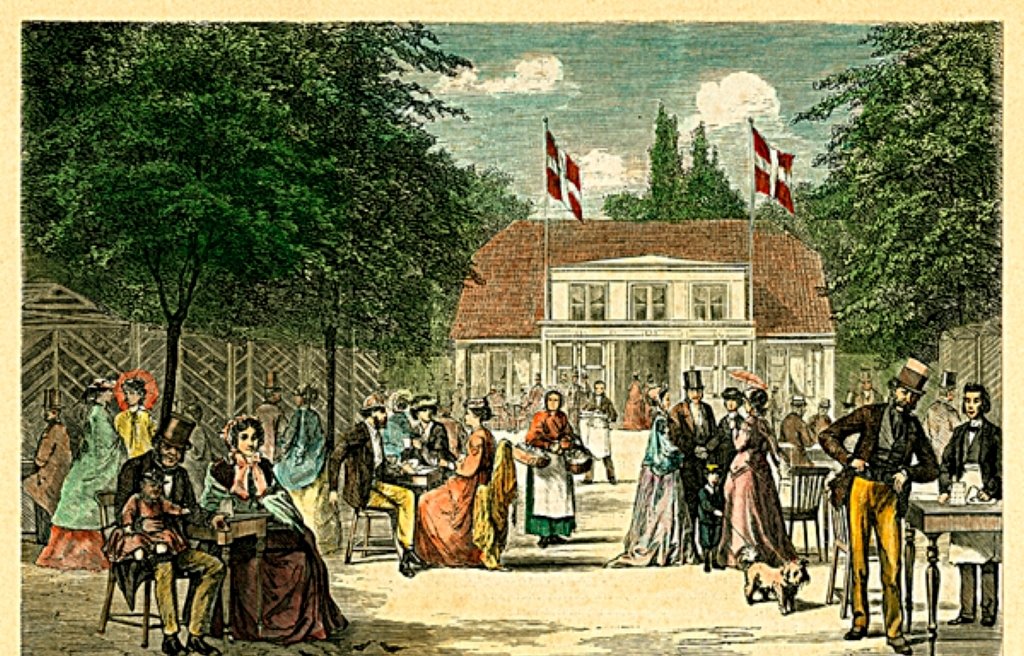
Josty's Pavilion

In the late 18th century Frederiksberg became a popular excursion destination for citizens from Copenhagen. Some 30 guest houses and entertainment establishments opened in the area, especially along Allégade, Pile Allé and Frederiksberg Alleé. The place that would later turn into Josty's Pavilion was opened by the Italian sculptor Angostino Taddei in 1813. In 1824, it was taken over by Anton Joss. Born in 1790 in the small village of Aver, Graubünden, Switzerland, he moved to Copenhagen in 1812 where he opened a pastry bakery under the name Josty on Østerbrogade (current No. 24). In 1824, Lord Chamberlain Adam Wilhelm Hauch, a frequent guest of the establishment, arranged for King Frederick VI to grant Josty a license to open a pastry shop at Frederiksberg Gardens. He constructed a new pavilion at his own expense that same year.

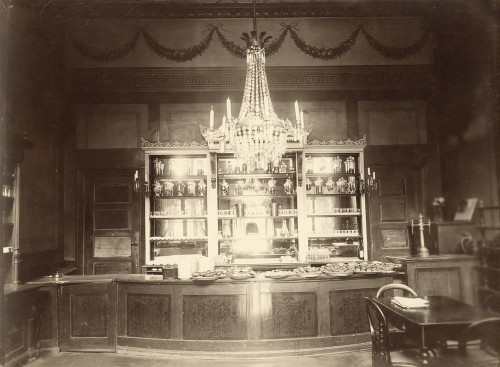
The buffet in Josty's Pavilion in 1899

When Anton Josty died in 1853 his only son, who was born 1832 and was also named Anton Josty, took over the business, running it until his death in 1899. Under the leadership of Anton Josty, his widow and children replaced the old pavilion with a significantly larger restaurant building. The Josty family owned the place until 1937.

== Today ==
Present day Josty plays host to celebrations, meetings and other events for up to 320 guests. It also has eight hotel rooms. The restaurant currently serves brunch and a café is operated on the veranda facing the park in the summer time. An à la carte restaurant is expected to open in 2016.
