= Cai A. Vagn-Hansen =

Danish civil servant (1911–1990)

Cai Andrias Vagn-Hansen (14 October 1911 – 23 November 1990) was a Danish civil servant.

== Biography ==
He graduated with a Master of Laws degree in 1936 and was secretary in the Ministry of the Interior from 1937 to 1945. He then served as county governor of the Faroe Islands from 1945 to 1948, when this title expired, and Vagn-Hansen became the Faroe Islands' first High Ombudsman. He resigned in 1954, and then became county governor of Aabenraa-Sønderborg County until the municipal reform in 1970 and was subsequently county governor of South Jutland County until his retirement in 1981.
