= MV Hellutangi =

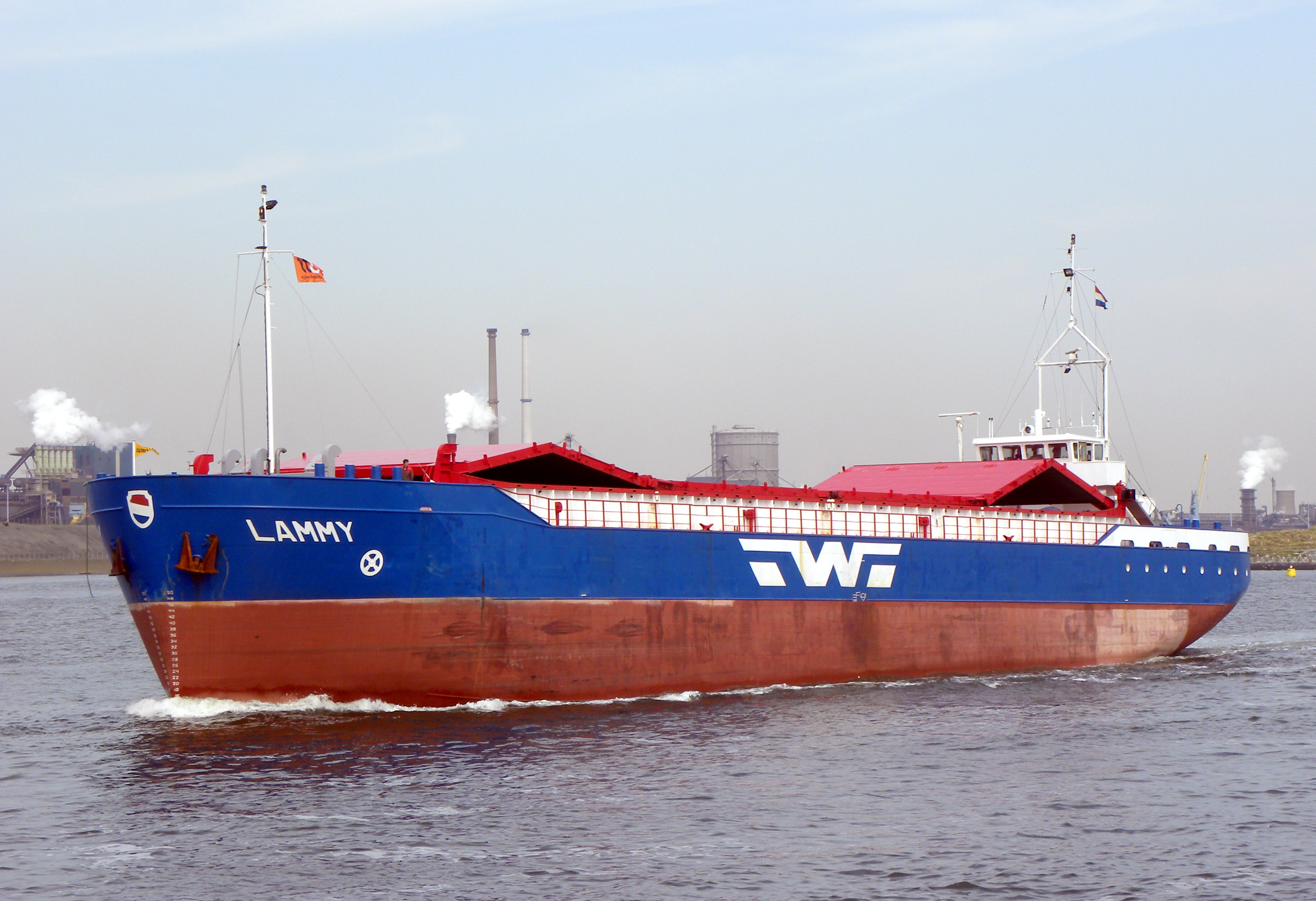
- As Lammy in 2009

History

Faroe Islands
- Name: 1986–1994: Alblas (Netherlands); 1994–2002: Salvinia; 2002–2009: Lammy; 2009–2018: Rova (Antigua and Barbuda); 2018–2021: Hellutangi (Faroe Islands)
- Owner: P/F Luna, Sandavágur
- Port of registry: Miðvágur, Faroe Islands
- Builder: Gebr. Buijs Scheepsbouw B.V., Krimpen aan den IJssel
- Yard number: 40
- Launched: 1 October 1986
- In service: 22 December 1986
- Fate: Beached in the Faroe Islands in 2021

General characteristics
- Type: General cargo ship
- Tonnage: 2,798 DWT
- Length: 79 m (259 ft 2 in)
- Beam: 12 m (39 ft 4 in)
- Height: 7.3 m
- Installed power: Caterpillar diesel, type 3512 DITA, 1600 rpm, 876 kW
- Propulsion: Single propeller
- Speed: 12 kn

MV Helluntangi was a general cargo ship under the Faroe Islands flag. According to the vessel tracking service provider, VesselFinder, the ship has a summer deadweight of 2,798 tonnes, an overall length of 79 meters, and a beam of 12 meters. It was beached by a storm in Faroe Islands waters, and was discovered on Vagar island on April 6, 2021. The crew were all evacuated and reported safe. The evacuation was executed using an AugustaWestland AW101 helicopter. An AQS Tor boat which was on the Hellutangi fell off and suffered damage.

The ship was commissioned for Dutch owners in 1986 by Gebroeders Buys, Krimpen aan den IJssel as Alblas. Sold and renamed Salvinia in 1994, Lammy in 2002 and Rova in 2009. In 2019, the vessel was completely rebuilt and outfitted as a feeding barge designated for fish farms by Poltramp Yard S.A. in Świnoujście, Poland. The ship was used as a fish farm support vessel with a homeport in Miðvágur. The owner was P/F Luna in Sandavágur.
