= Miss Faroe Islands =

- Formation: 1991
- Type: Beauty pageant
- Headquarters: Tórshavn
- Location: Faroe Islands
- Members: Miss Universe
- Official language: Faroese
- Website: missfaroeislands.com

Miss Faroe Islands is a national beauty pageant in the Faroe Islands.

== History ==
The pageant was held for the first time in 2017. Miss Earth Denmark 2015 Turið Elinborgardóttir is a consultant for the pageant.

== Titleholders ==
Year	Miss Faroe Islands
2019	Monika Midjord Nolsøe
2018	Benita Winther Jensen

== Faroe Islands at International pageants ==
=== Miss Universe Faroe Islands ===
- : Declared as Winner
- : Ended as runner-up or top 5/6 qualification
- : Ended as one of the finalists or semifinalists
- : Ended as special awards winner

Year	Miss Faroe Islands	Placement at Miss Universe	Special Awards	Notes
Did not compete since 2019—present
2018	Benita Winther Jensen	Did not compete		
