= Frederiksberg Gardens =

Park in Frederiksberg Municipality, Denmark

Frederiksberg Gardens and Søndermarken
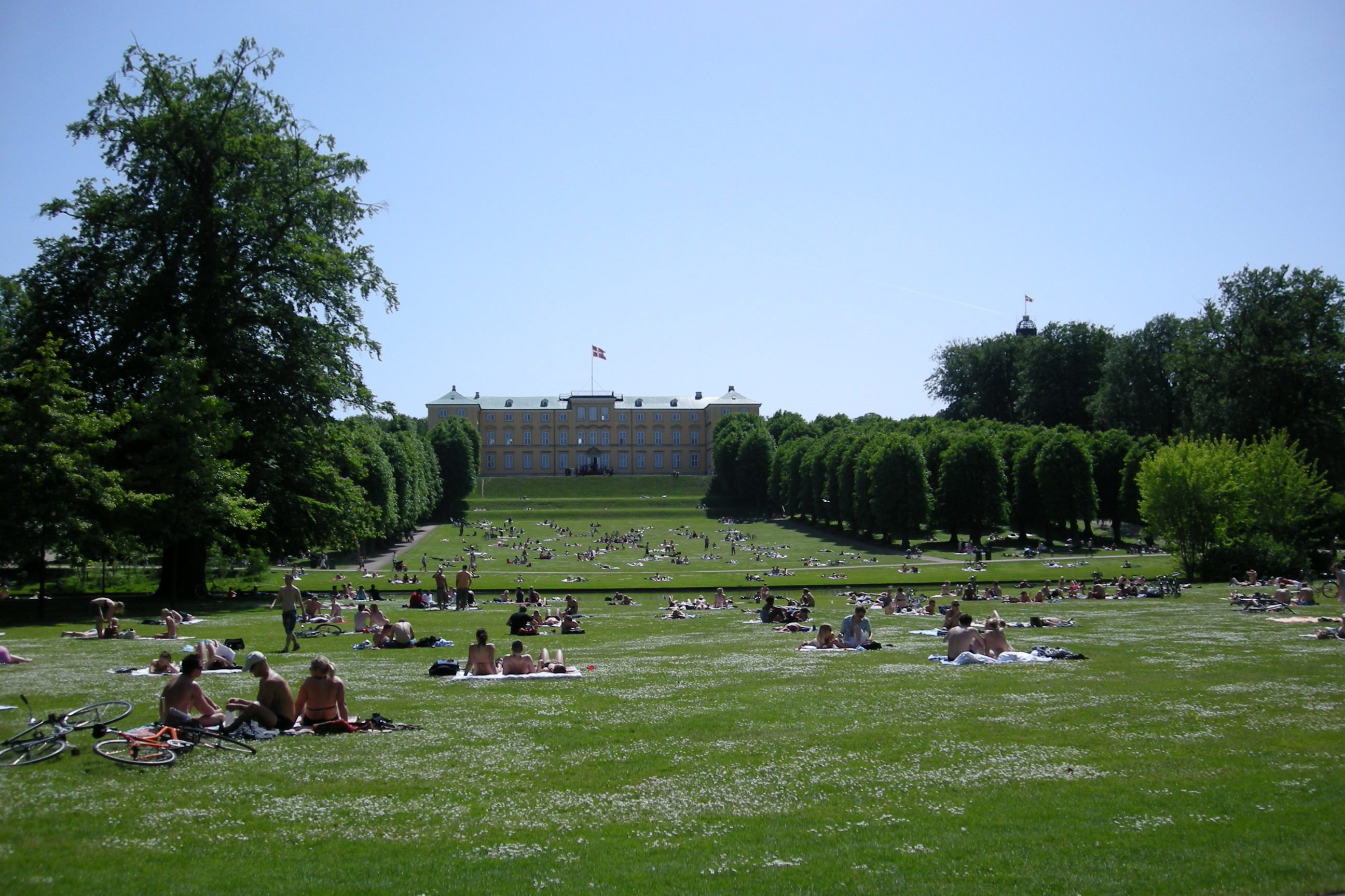
- Frederiksberg Gardens with Frederiksberg Palace

- Location within Denmark
- Type: Public park
- Location: Frederiksberg, Copenhagen
- Coordinates: 55°40′30″N 12°31′30″E
- Area: Frederiksberg Gardens 31,7 hectares Søndermarken 32,3 hectares
- Created: 1699
- Operator: State owned. Slots- og Ejendomsstyrelsen
- Open: All year

Frederiksberg Gardens (Danish: Frederiksberg Have) is one of the largest and most attractive greenspaces in Copenhagen, Denmark. Together with the adjacent Søndermarken it forms a green area of 64 hectares at the western edge of Inner Copenhagen. It is a romantic landscape garden designed in the English style.

== History ==
=== The original Baroque garden ===
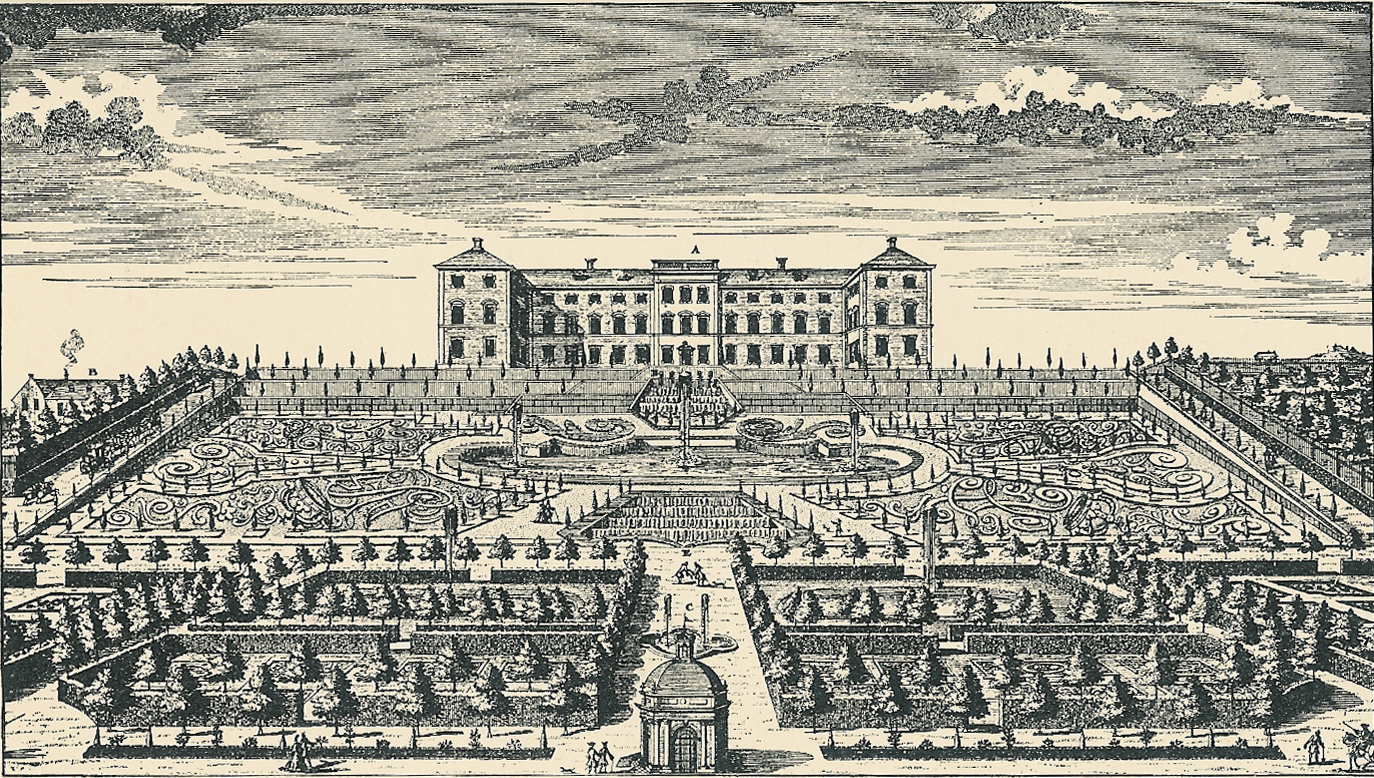
The parterre in front of the palace in 1718

Frederiksberg Gardens was established by King Frederik IV in connection with the construction of Frederiksberg Palace as his new summer retreat on high grounds atop Valby Hill. Work on the project began in the last half of the 1690s with inspiration from Italy and France which Frederick, at that time still Crown Prince, had visited on several occasions. He commissioned the eminent Swedish architect Nicodemus Tessin to draw a proposal and the final plan was subsequently made by Hans Heinrich Scheel, a captain in the Corps of Royal Engineers.

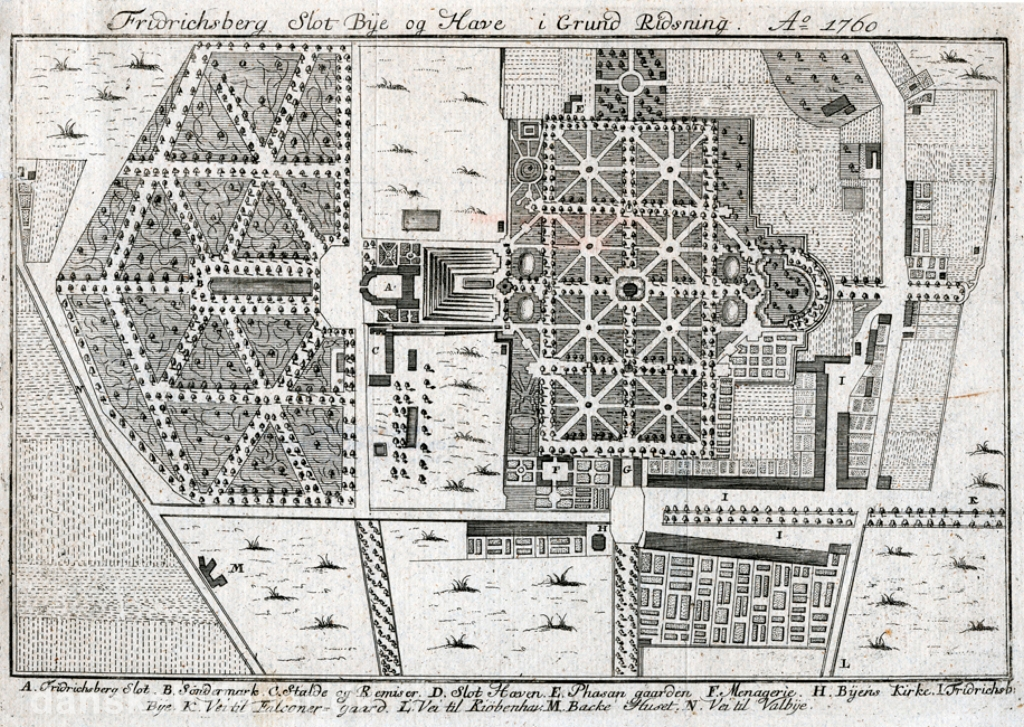
Plan of the park in 1760

The plan involved a parterre with a complex system of cascades on the sloping terrain in front of the new palace. It was fed by a complicated but inefficient system of pumps which never came to work properly.

In the end, Johan Cornelius Krieger, who was at the time also working on an extension and adaption of Fredensborg Palace, north of Copenhagen, was called upon to redesign the parterre. Unusually of the time, he gave up the parterre completely and instead transformed the slope into a series of terraces.

=== The Romantic garden ===
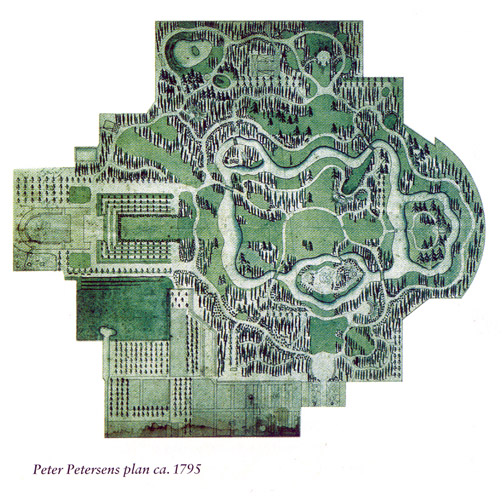
Plan by P. Petersen from 1795 of the Romantic landscape garden

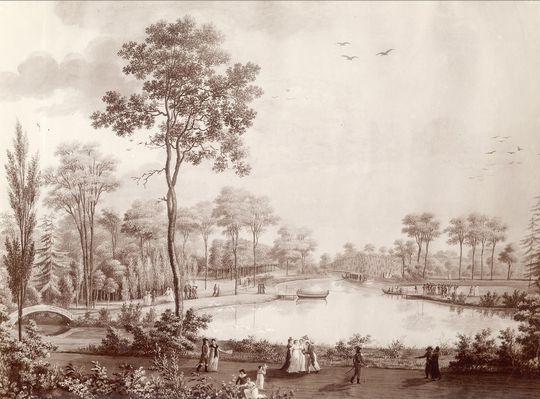
The garden c. 1801

In the 1790s, as fashion changed, the park was adapted into an English landscape garden. P. Petersen created a new garden plan in 1795. He created a typical English-style landscape garden with winding lawns, lakes, canals and spinneys as well as grottos, temples, pavilions and summerhouses. The final result may well have been based on Johan Ludwig Mansa's book on English-style gardening written in 1798.

Frederik VI was particularly fond of the garden. From 1804, he sailed the canals in a gondola. It was later moved to Frederiksborg Castle and Lake Esrum.

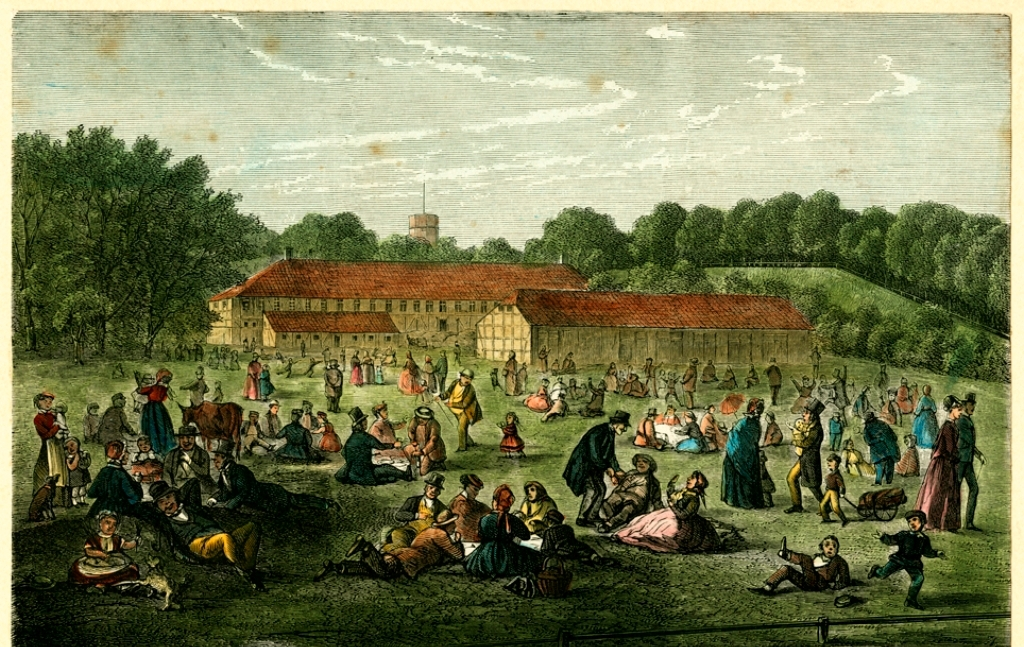
The Smørrebrød Lawn, with Kavalergården in the background. Illustration from Illustreret Tidende, 18

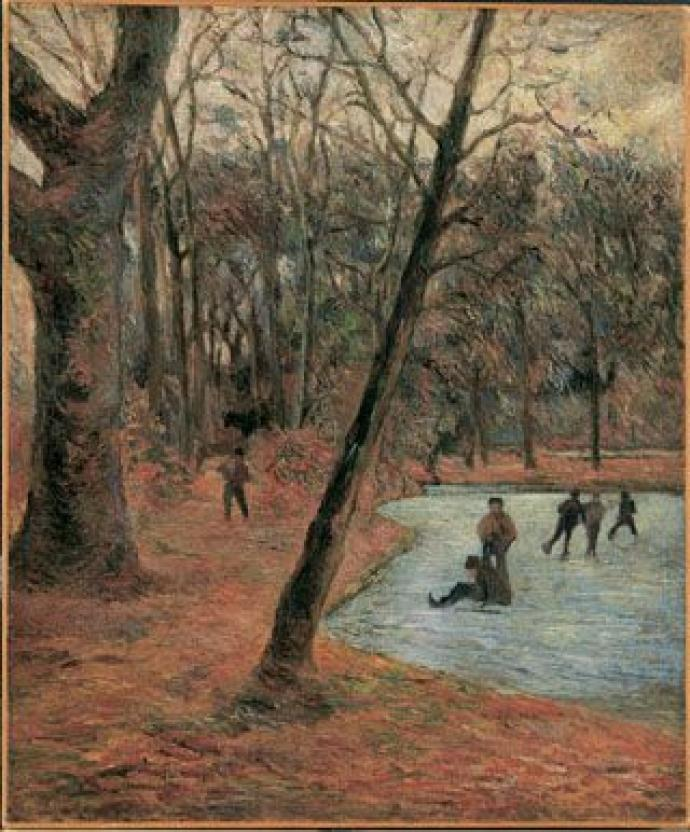
Skaters painted in the park by Paul Gauguin in 1885, the same year the public was given unrestricted access to the park.

Though a palace park, the general public had access to the grounds but sailors, dogs and people in poor clothing or carrying large bundles were turned away by the guard at the park's sole entrance. Not until 1865 did access to the park become unrestricted, in line with what was the case elsewhere in the city, such as at Langelinie. Smørrebrødsplænen (Smørrebrød Lawn), on the corner of Roskildevej and Pile Allé, where K. B.'s tennis halls are today, became a popular picnic destination for families.

== Frederiksberg Gardens today ==
Frederiksberg Gardens is an English-style Romantic landscape garden with winding paths, canals, lakes, small islands and magnificent trees. A large variety of plants and birds can be seen, including mute swans, greylag geese, mallards, grey herons, and Canada geese.

Typically of the romantic landscape garden, the park houses two follies, waterfalls, grottos and other garden features.

== Buildings and features ==
=== Main entrance ===
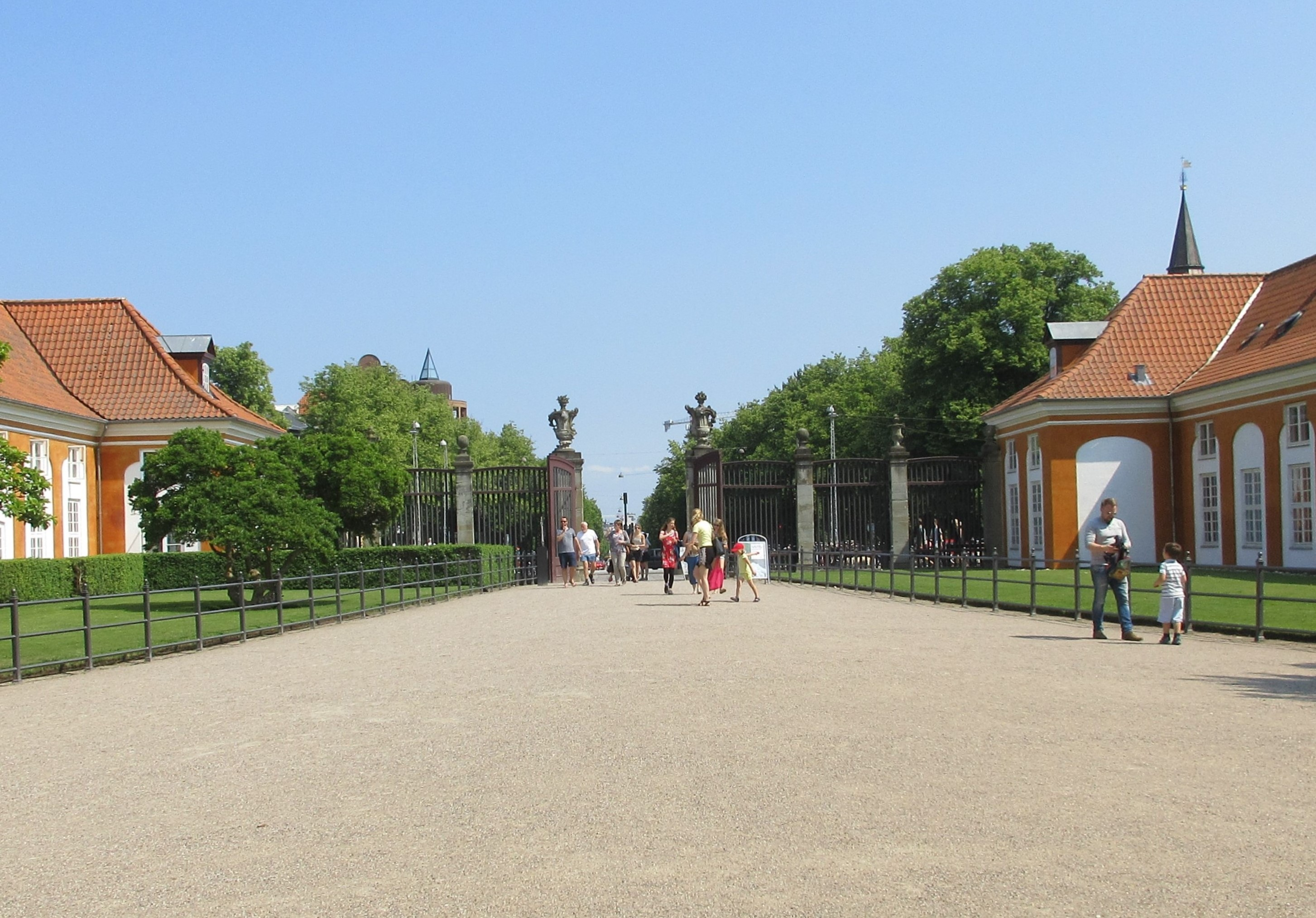
Inside view of the entrance

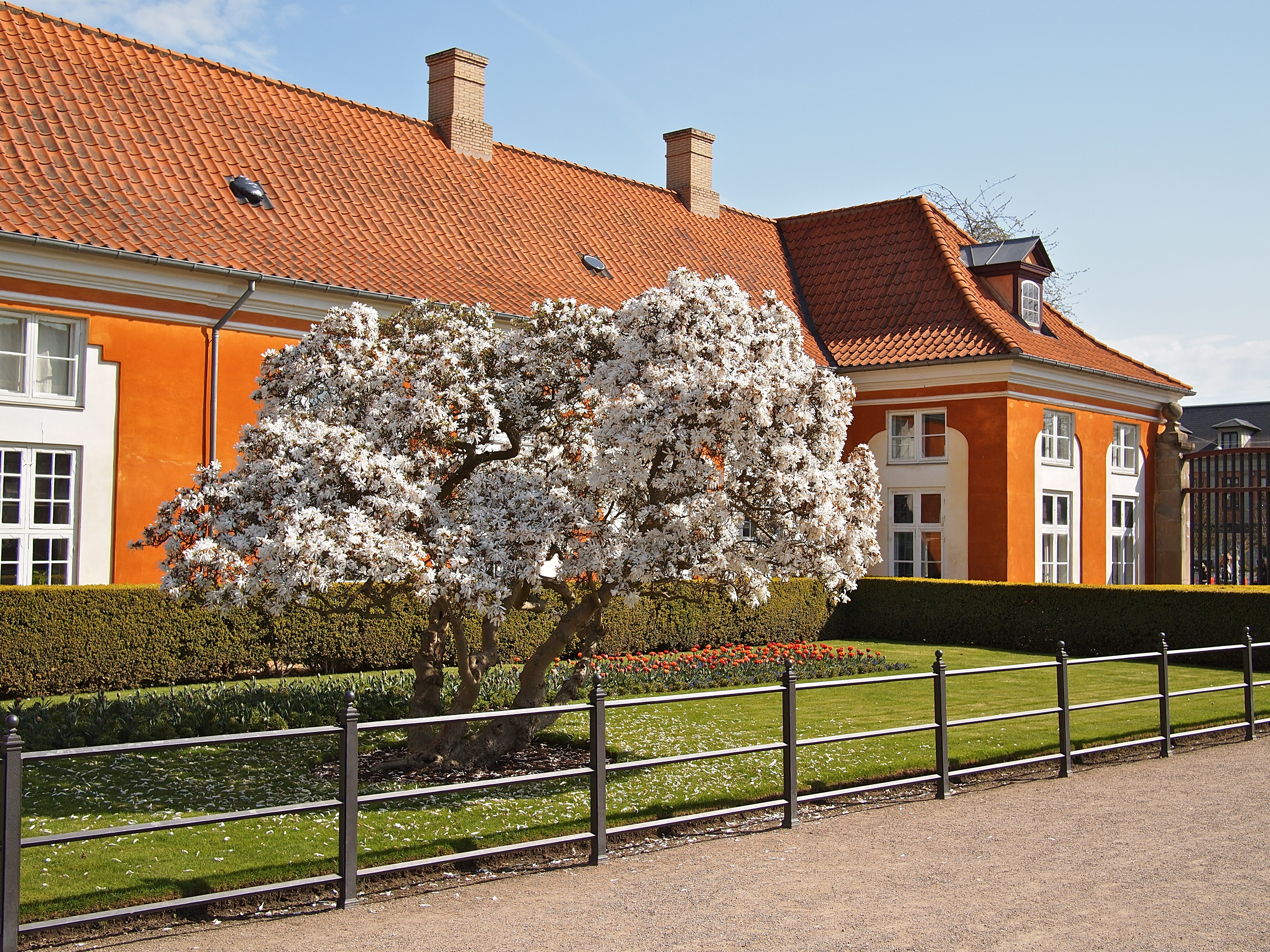
One of the buildings flanking the main entrance

The main entrance to Frederiksberg Gardens was, in its present form, built in 1755, following the fire two years earlier at the Prince's House, the precursor of Frederiksberg Palace, which used to be located at the site. The gate was designed by Lauritz de Thurah who had become general master builder after Eigtved's death. The vases at the top of the two sandstone pillars were executed by the sculptor Johann Friedrich Hännel.

The gate opens to a path which passes between two long, yellow buildings with white details. They are the two surviving wings of the Prince's House. The south wing, located on the left-hand side when entering the park, was converted into an orangery by Nicolai Eigtved in 1744 and is now part of the Royal Danish Horticultural Society's Garden. The north wing, located on the right-hand side, is used by the park's administration.

=== Chinese summerhouse and bridge ===
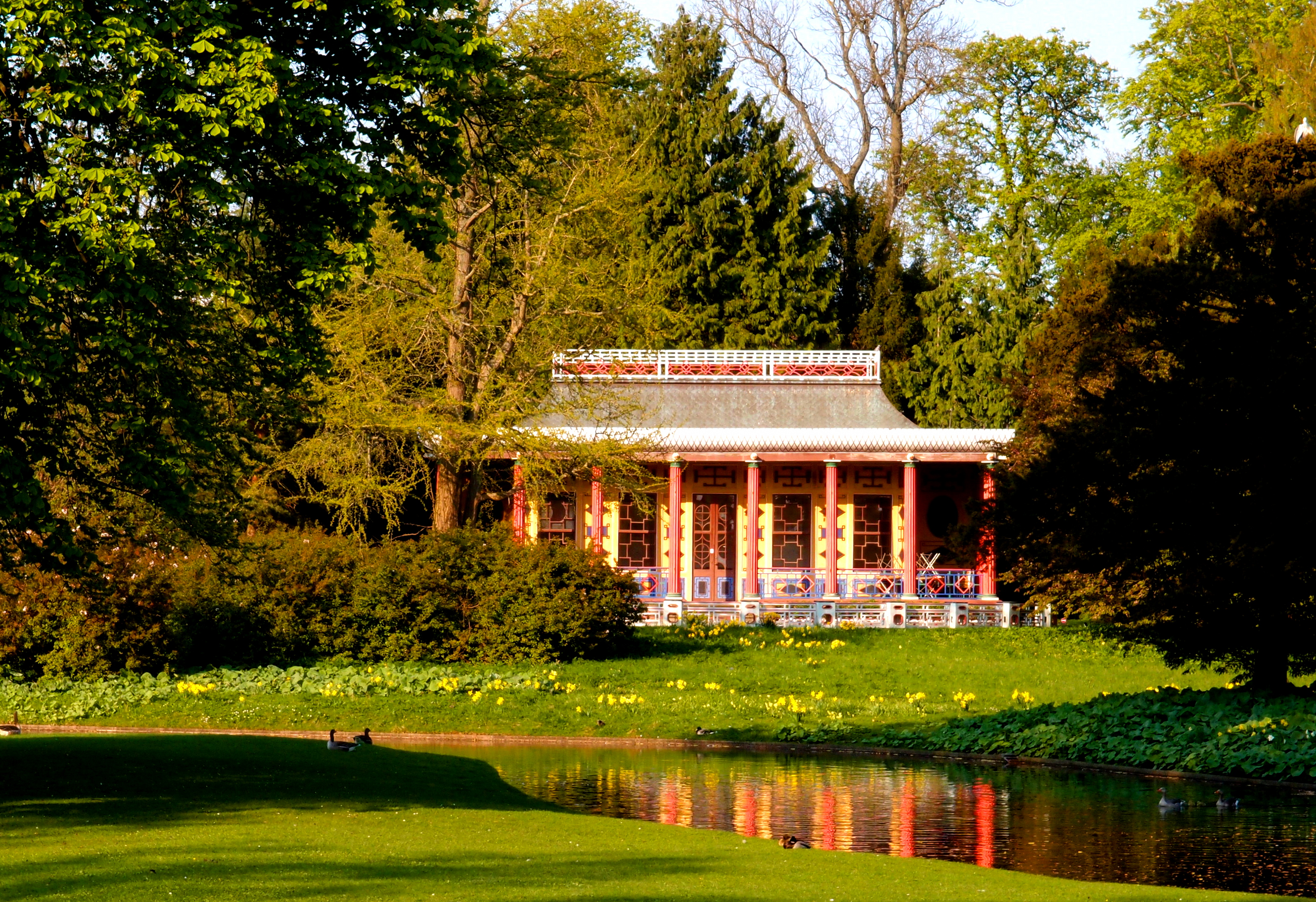
The Chinese summerhouse seen from the distance

The Chinese summerhouse was completed in 1803 as a replacement for a pavilion which had stood at the center of the baroque garden but was pulled down in 1799. It was sited on a small artificial island accessible by across a bridge which was built to a matching Chinese design.

The summerhouse was built by the court architect Andreas Kirkerup, and like the rest of the buildings in the park it was a feature well known from the English garden.

The summerhouse contained a hall, two cabinets, a kitchen and lavatory. The only window in the lavatory was in the shape of a half moon and was made of red glass. The furniture consisted partly of copies of Chinese furniture as well as a set of genuine Chinese bamboo furniture acquired through the Asiatic Company.

Both the exterior and the interior has rich Chinese-inspired decorations, pictures, characters and other ornaments, and there were bells on the roof. Imitation bamboo was used in the ceilings.

=== Apis Temple ===
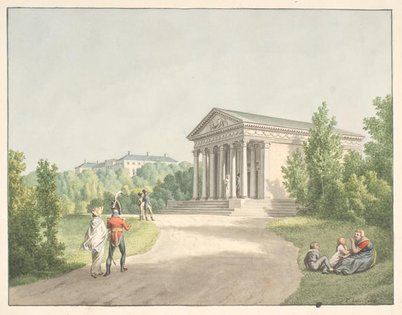
Watercolour by C. W. Eckersberg showing the Apis Temple in 1809

The Apis Temple is located on the border to Copenhagen Zoo. It was designed in the style of a Roman temple by the painter Nicolai Abildgaard and built in 1802. It is named for the Egyptian bull-deity Apis which is depicted on the frontispice. The temple front consists of 10 columns of which 8 are recycled from a rebuilding of Moltke's Palace while the last 2 columns are replicas. Decorations include the Ox Cranium Frieze and the Bull Relief, both carved in sandstone.

On the inside, the temple consists of a barrel vaulted room with two windows which originally had stained glass. The room was furnished with a sofa, chairs and console tables which the royalties could use for drinking tea. From 1874 to 1970, the temple was used as entrance to the Zoo that was built in 1859, and the décor changed. The temple is occasionally open for the public and has been used for art exhibitions.

=== Swiss Cottage ===
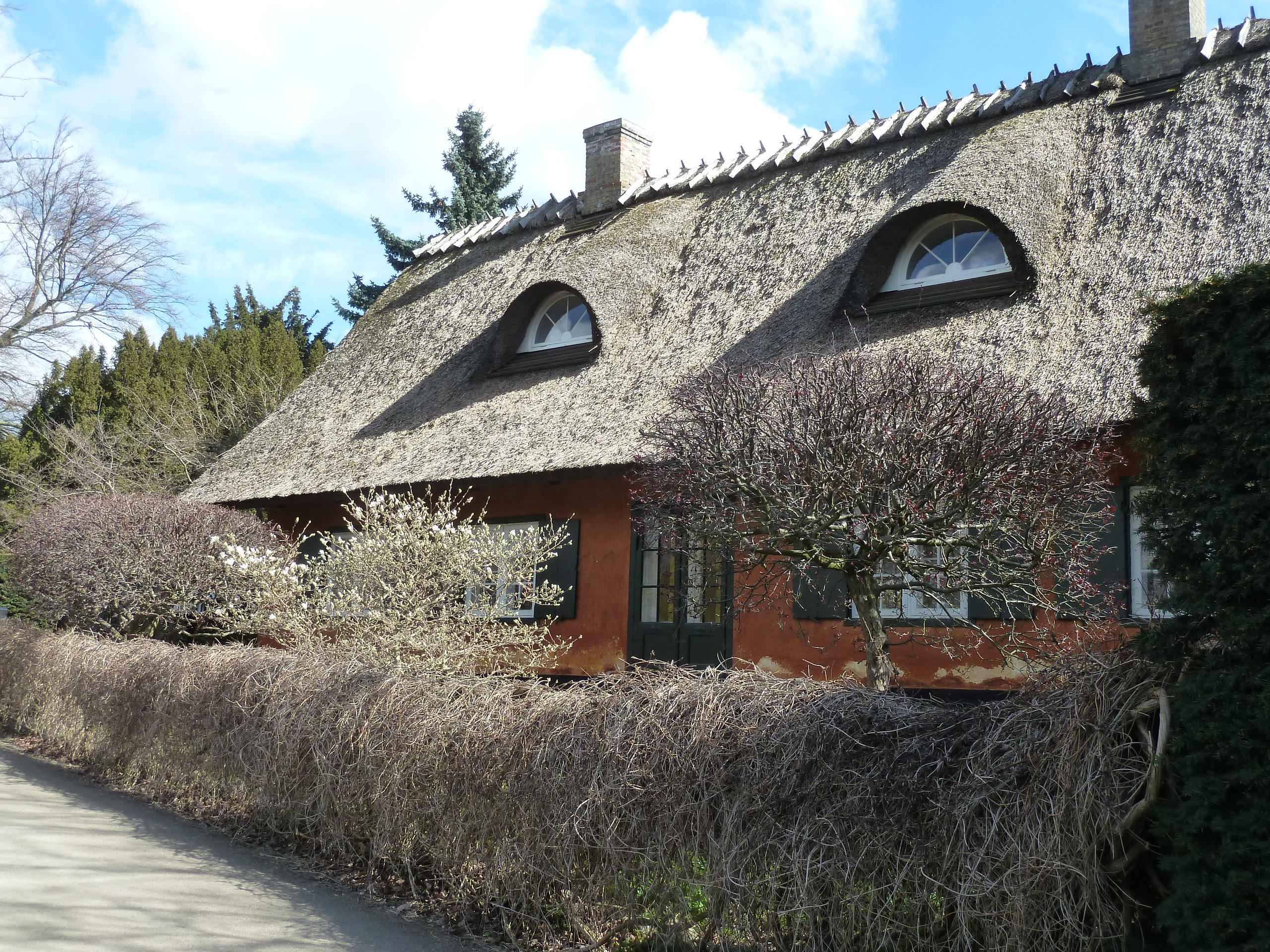
A peek of the Swiss Cottage

Like the Apis Temple, the Swiss Cottage lies in the part of the park that was incorporated when the park was redesigned in the Romantic style. Designed by Abildgaard and built between 1800 and 1801, the contains a hall, a cabinet and some smaller rooms in which the royal family could take coffee after dinner or a stroll in the garden. In 1894, the house was converted into a residence for the castle gardener, and the interior was radically altered.

The style has little to do with Switzerland but the name bears testament to the period's fascination with mountainous regions. The cottage was built next to a small lake and the vegetation around the cottage was adapted, with conifers instead of deciduous trees, to create the right atmosphere of the setting.

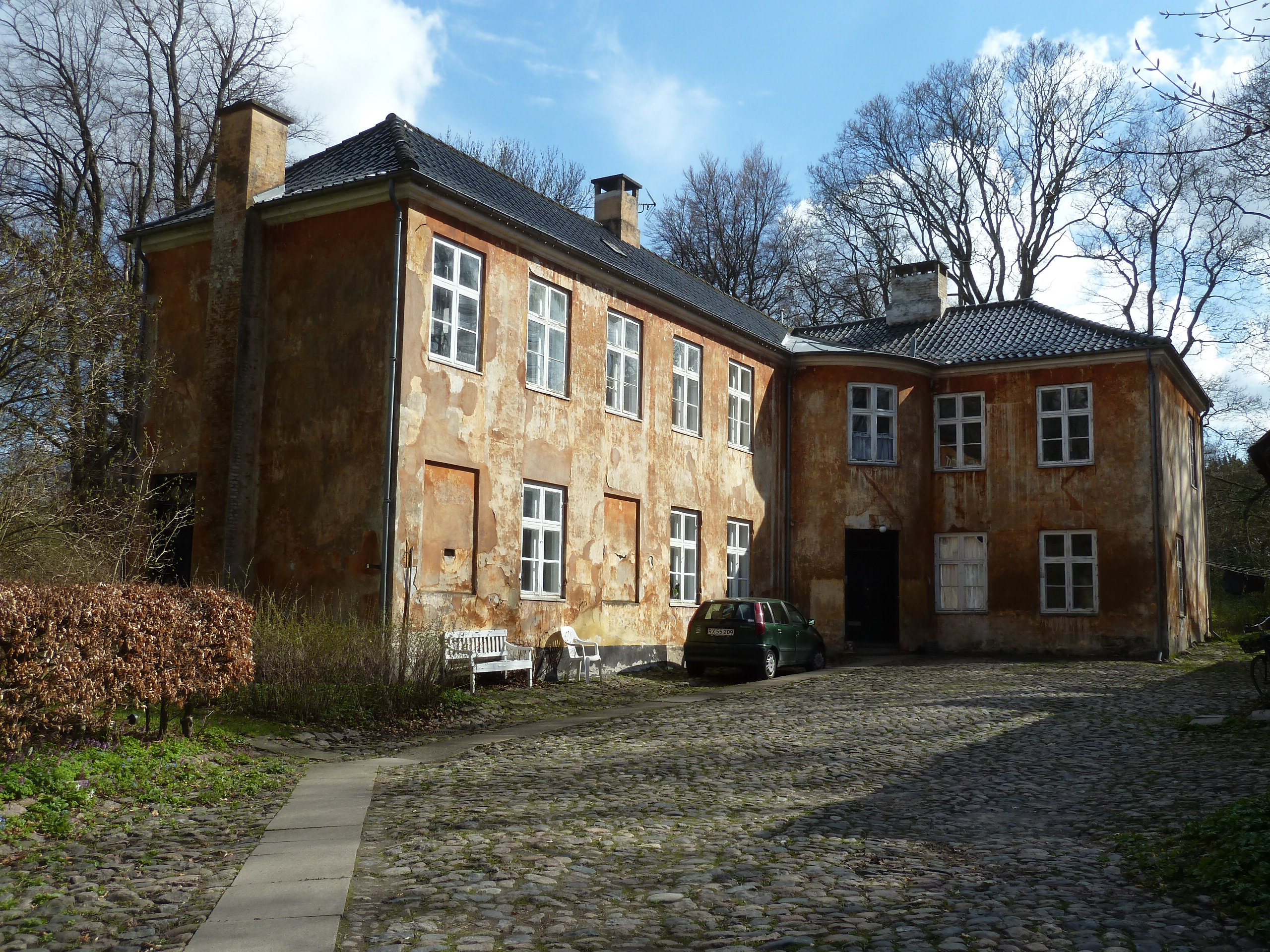
Fasangården

=== The Pheasantry ===
Close to the Swiss Cottage stands the Pheasantry (Da. Fasangården) which was designed by J.C. Krieger and built in 1723. As the name suggests, the building was originally built in connection with a pheasantry which raised pheasants for the royal household. When the park was redesigned around 1800, there were plans to tear down the house but instead it was turned into a residence for the king's private secretary, P.C. Jessen, who had already used it during summer since 1798. The building was adapted in 1828 by Jørgen Hansen Koch. It served as summer residence for Adam Oehlenschläger and his family from 1842 to 1850. It was carefully restored in 2019–2020 and is open to the public as a restaurant.

=== Artificial waterfall ===
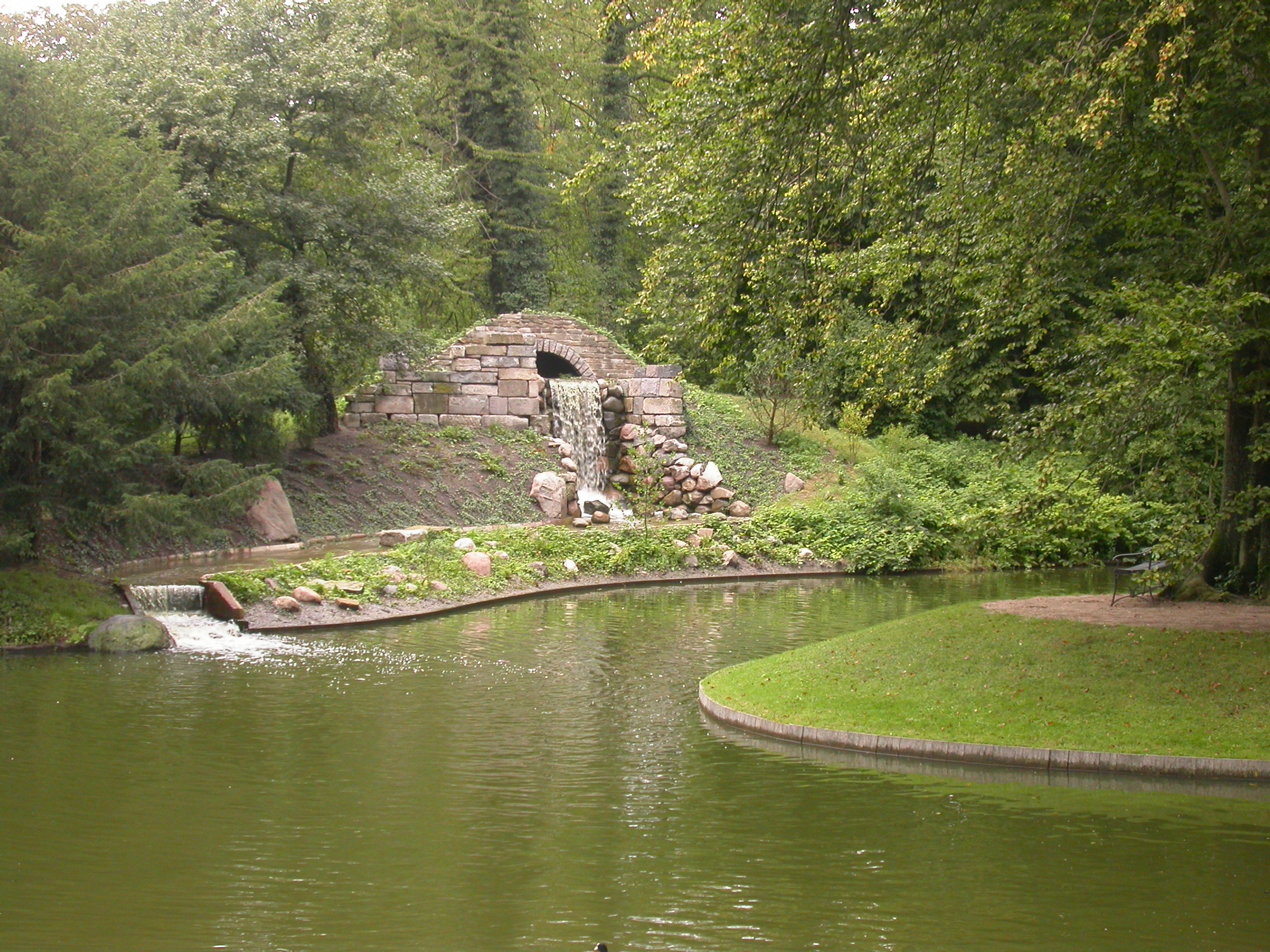
The waterfall

Another garden feature typical of the romantic garden is an artificial waterfall. The waterfall is 7 metres high and is partly created out of marble blocks from the building site of the Marble Church. The waterfall was left as a ruin for many years but was reconstructed in 2004.

=== Elephant viewpoint ===
When Norman Foster, in collaboration with the Danish landscape architect Stig L. Andersson, designed the new Elephant House for the adjacent Copenhagen Zoo, it was done as an extension of Frederiksberg Gardens. A three-metre high wall that once separated the two has been replaced by a simple fence, so that visitors to the public park can now watch the elephants, while affording the elephants distant views as well. The enclosure steps up slowly away from the park, rising to the height of the domes. From a distance, these appear to be buried in the ground, surrounded by ferns and trees.

=== Suttetræ (Pacifier tree) ===
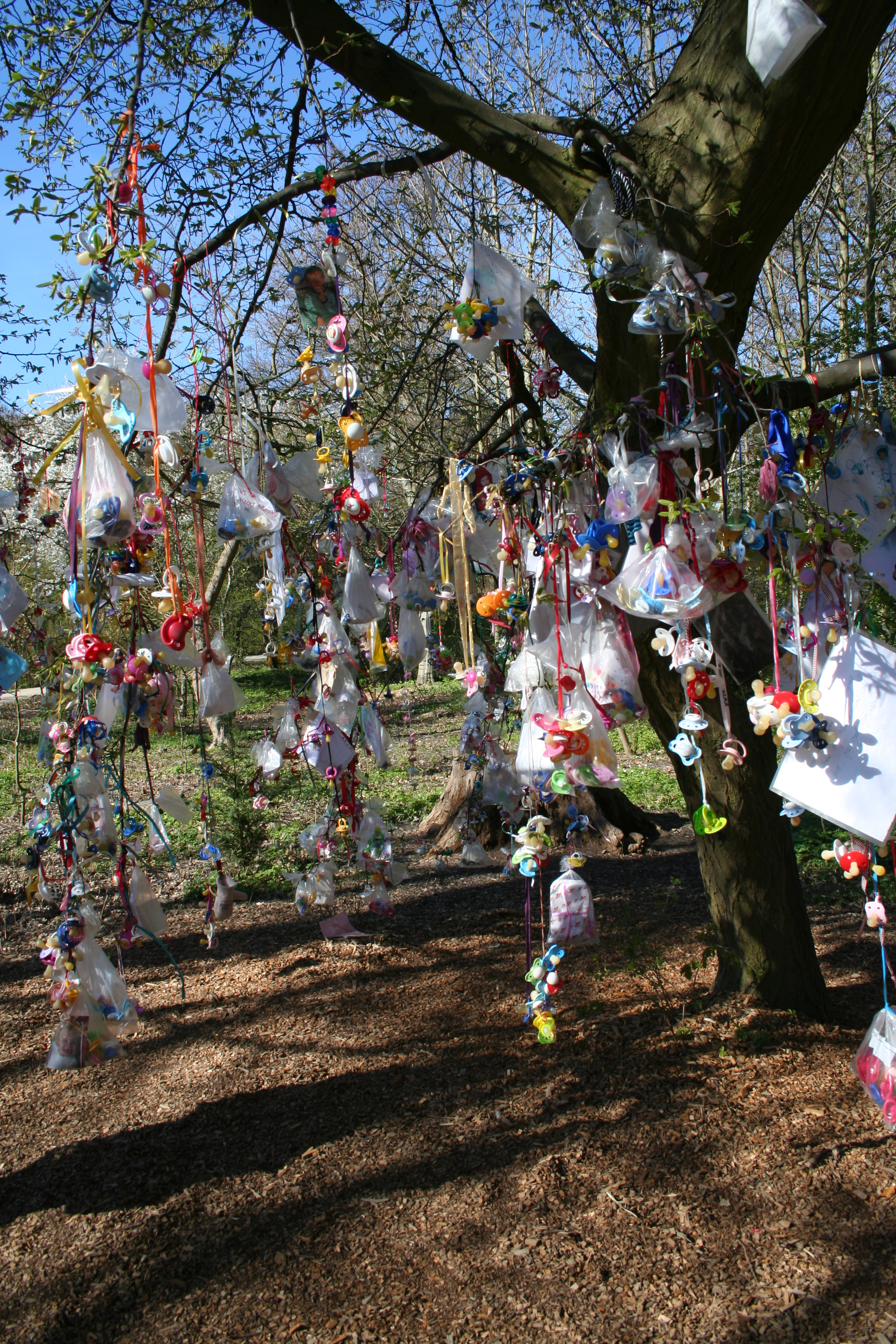
Pacifier Tree at Frederiksberg Gardens - Copenaghen (Denmark)

Near the north entrance to the park, there is also a Pacifier tree where children who have outgrown the need to use a pacifier leave their pacifiers by hanging them on the branch, sometimes with a letter.

== Events and activities ==
Every year on Midsummer Eve, the park is a rallying point for thousands of people who attend community singing, speeches, music and a "witch"-burning bonfire at the lakeside in front of the palace.

== Cultural references ==
- In Hans Christian Andersen's fairy tale The Elder-Tree Mother, an old married couple remembers how they used to go to the Round Tower, "and looked down on Copenhagen, and far, far away over the water; then we went to Frederiksberg [Gardens], where the King and the Queen were sailing about in their splendid barges!'.

== See also ==
- Parks and open spaces in Copenhagen
- Josty
