= 2012 Faroese municipal merger referendum =

A municipal merger referendum was held in the Faroe Islands on 3 May 2012. Proposals were put forward for merging the thirty existing municipalities into seven new municipalities, with voters in each of the proposed new areas voting on the merger. The proposition was rejected in six of the seven proposed new municipalities. As a result, none of the mergers went ahead.

== Background ==
Proposals for municipality mergers and delegating powers to municipalities had been discussed for 20–25 years prior to the referendum. The Centre Party, People's Party and Social Democratic Party were in favour of voluntary mergers, whilst the Self-Government Party, Republic and Union Party favoured creating the mergers by legislation. Progress advocated for drafting legislation on the mergers and submitting it to voters through a referendum.

In the autumn of 2011, the Faroese government announced that it would be transferring responsibility for elderly care and primary education from 1 January 2014, and that the number of municipalities would need to be reduced from the 30 that existed at the time. A referendum on the merger proposals was announced by Interior Minister Kári P. Højgaard on 20 December 2011, which was based on section 7 of the Act on Voluntary Municipal Mergers and Inter-municipal Cooperation on Statutory Services. Anyone eligible to vote in municipal elections was able to vote in the referendum.

== Proposed mergers ==
| Proposed municipality | Existing municipalities | Population (1 January 2012) |
|---|---|---|
| Eysturoy | Fuglafjørður, Eystur, Nes, Runavík, Sjóvar | 9,451 |
| Norðoyar | Fugloy, Húsar, Hvannasund, Klaksvík, Kunoy, Viðareiði | 5,821 |
| Sandoy | Húsavík, Sandur, Skálavík Skopun, Skúvoy | 1,325 |
| Streymoy | Kvívík, Tórshavn, Vestmanna | 21,601 |
| Suðuroy | Fámjin, Hov, Hvalba, Porkeri, Sumba, Tvøroyri, Vágur | 4,676 |
| Sundalagið | Eiði, Sunda | 2,334 |
| Vágar | Sørvágur, Vágar | 3,076 |
Source: Hagstova

== Results ==
Vágar, where the merger process was already underway, was the only proposed municipality area in which voters approved the proposals. Although there were majorities in some individual municipalities, these were largely areas that were expected to become the centre of the new municipality; only three of the peripheral municipalities voted in favour.

| Proposed municipality | For | | Against | | Invalid blank | Total | Registered voters | Turnout | Result |
| Proposed municipality | Votes | % | Votes | % | Invalid blank | Total | Registered voters | Turnout | Result |
|---|---|---|---|---|---|---|---|---|---|
| Eysturoy | | 36.3 | | 63.7 | | 2,964 | 6,929 | 42.8 | Rejected |
| Norðoyar | | 47.6 | | 52.4 | | 1,149 | 4,351 | 26.4 | Rejected |
| Sandoy | | 47.6 | | 52.4 | | 555 | 1,008 | 55.1 | Rejected |
| Streymoy | | 27.8 | | 72.2 | | 3,508 | 15,763 | 22.2 | Rejected |
| Suðuroy | | 34.5 | | 65.5 | | 1,729 | 3,558 | 48.6 | Rejected |
| Sundalagið | | 41.1 | | 58.9 | | 569 | 1,690 | 33.7 | Rejected |
| Vágar | | 63.3 | | 36.7 | | 1,163 | 2,227 | 52.2 | Accepted |
| Total | | | | | | 11,637 | 35,526 | 32.8 | |
Source: KVF Folketing
