= High Commission of Denmark, Tórshavn =

Danish institution in the Faroe Islands

High Commission of Denmark in the Faroe Islands Ríkisumboðið í Føroyum (Faroese) Rigsombuddet på Færøerne (Danish)
- Location: Tórshavn, Faroe Islands
- Address: Amtmansbrekkan 6
- High Commissioner: Lene Moyell Johansen
- Website: Official website

The High Commission of Denmark in the Faroe Islands (Faroese: Ríkisumboðið í Føroyum, Danish: Rigsombuddet på Færøerne) is a Danish institution in the Faroe Islands.

The High Commissioner represents the crown and the Kingdom Government in the Faroe Islands. The office is responsible for liaising between the Territorial Home Rule Government (Landsstýri) and the Government of Denmark.

The Government of the Faroe Islands notifies the High Commission of all statutes and regulations adopted by the Parliament of the Faroe Islands (Løgting) and of any other general legislation drawn up by the Government of the Faroe Islands. In addition, the Government of the Faroe Islands may call on the High Commissioner to participate in negotiations within Faroese institutions.

The High Commission draws up an annual report on the condition of Faroese society.

== The High Commissioner of the Faroe Islands ==
The High Commissioner is permitted to participate in all negotiations concerning matters of common interest in the Lagting (the Parliament of the Faroe Islands) and without, however, having the right to vote.

The High Commission is an ex-officio member of the Danish-Faroese Cultural Foundation.

== See also ==
- High Commission of Denmark, Nuuk
