= Søren Christensen (politician) =

Danish politician

High Commissioner of the Faroe Islands
- In office 1 August 2005 – 1 January 2008
- Preceded by: Birgit Kleis
- Succeeded by: Dan M. Knudsen

Secretary General for the Nordic Council of Ministers
- In office 1996–2002
- Preceded by: Pär Stenbäck
- Succeeded by: Per Unckel

Personal details
- Born: 31 October 1940 (age 84); Gentofte, Denmark

Søren Christensen (born 1940) is a Danish politician who served as High Commissioner of the Faroe Islands from 2005 to 2008. Previously, he was Secretary General of the Nordic Council of Ministers from 1997 until 2003.

== See also ==
- List of Danish High Commissioners in the Faroe Islands
