= Constitution Day (Denmark) =

National holiday in Denmark

Grundlovsdag
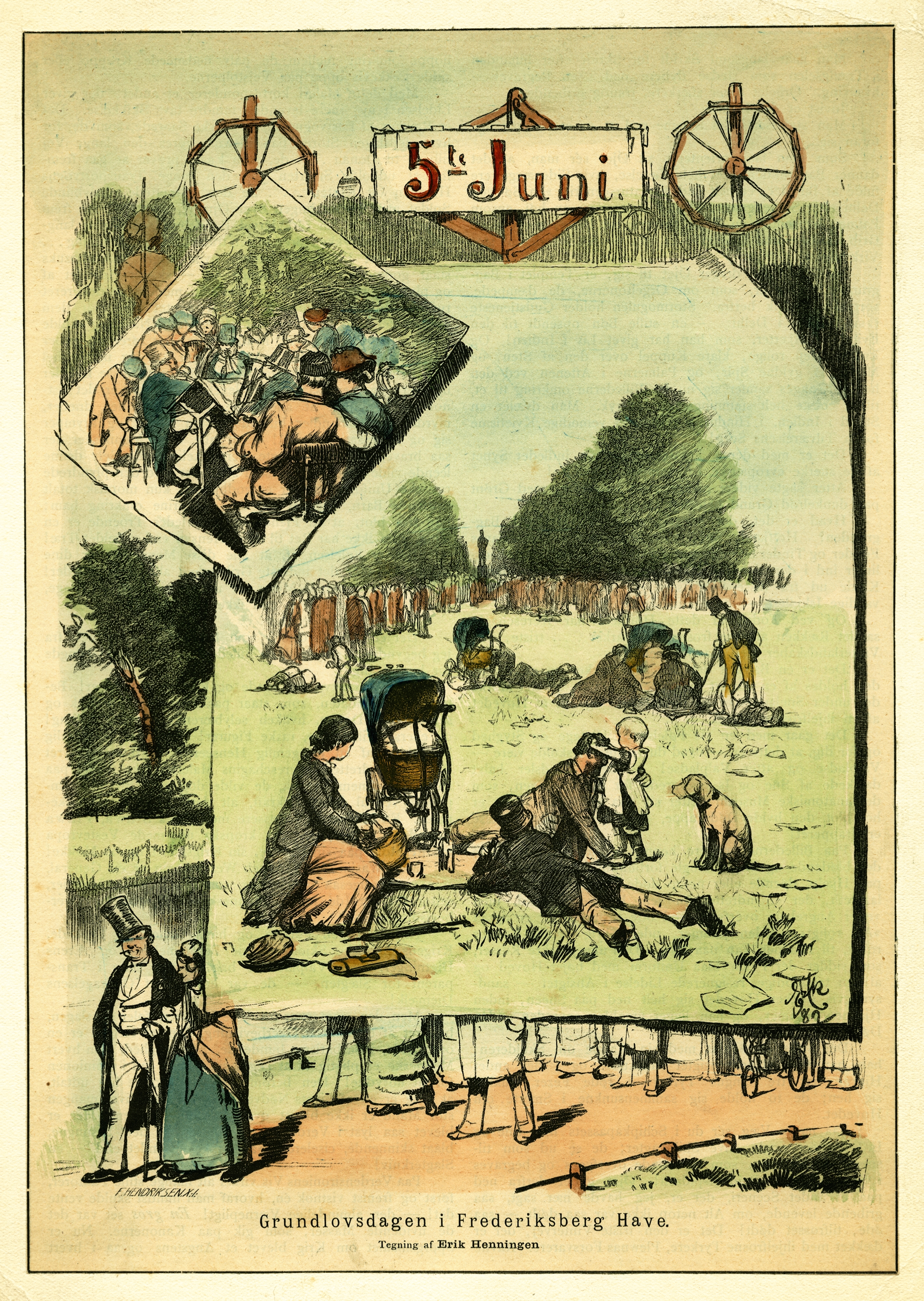
- Constitution Day celebrations in Frederiksberg Gardens. Drawn by Erik Henningsen, 1882.
- Also called: Constitution Day
- Observed by: Danes
- Type: National
- Significance: Anniversary of the Danish constitution
- Celebrations: Speeches by politicians
- Date: 5 June
- Next time: 5 June 2027
- Frequency: annual

Constitution Day (Danish: Grundlovsdag [ˈɡ̊ʁɔnlɒwsˌdæːˀ]) is observed in Denmark on 5 June. The day honours the Constitution of Denmark, as both the first constitution of 1849 and the current constitution of 1953 were signed on this date of their respective years. Denmark is one of only a handful countries in the world not to have an official national day, but Constitution Day is sometimes considered the equivalent of such a day, and a day for celebrating Danish democracy.

Though it has never been an official national holiday, Constitution Day was a half-day off work from 1891 until 1975. Since then, collective labour agreements have usually given workers a half-day or the whole day off on Constitution Day. Stores with an annual turnover of at most 43.4 million kroner can stay open on Constitution Day, but most stores must keep closed.

The day is widely celebrated throughout Denmark with church congregations, associations and political organisations meeting for what are essentially "secular services". These services include the raising of the Dannebrog (the Danish flag), a short speech by a local politician or celebrity, and collective singing (Danish: fællessang).

== Date ==
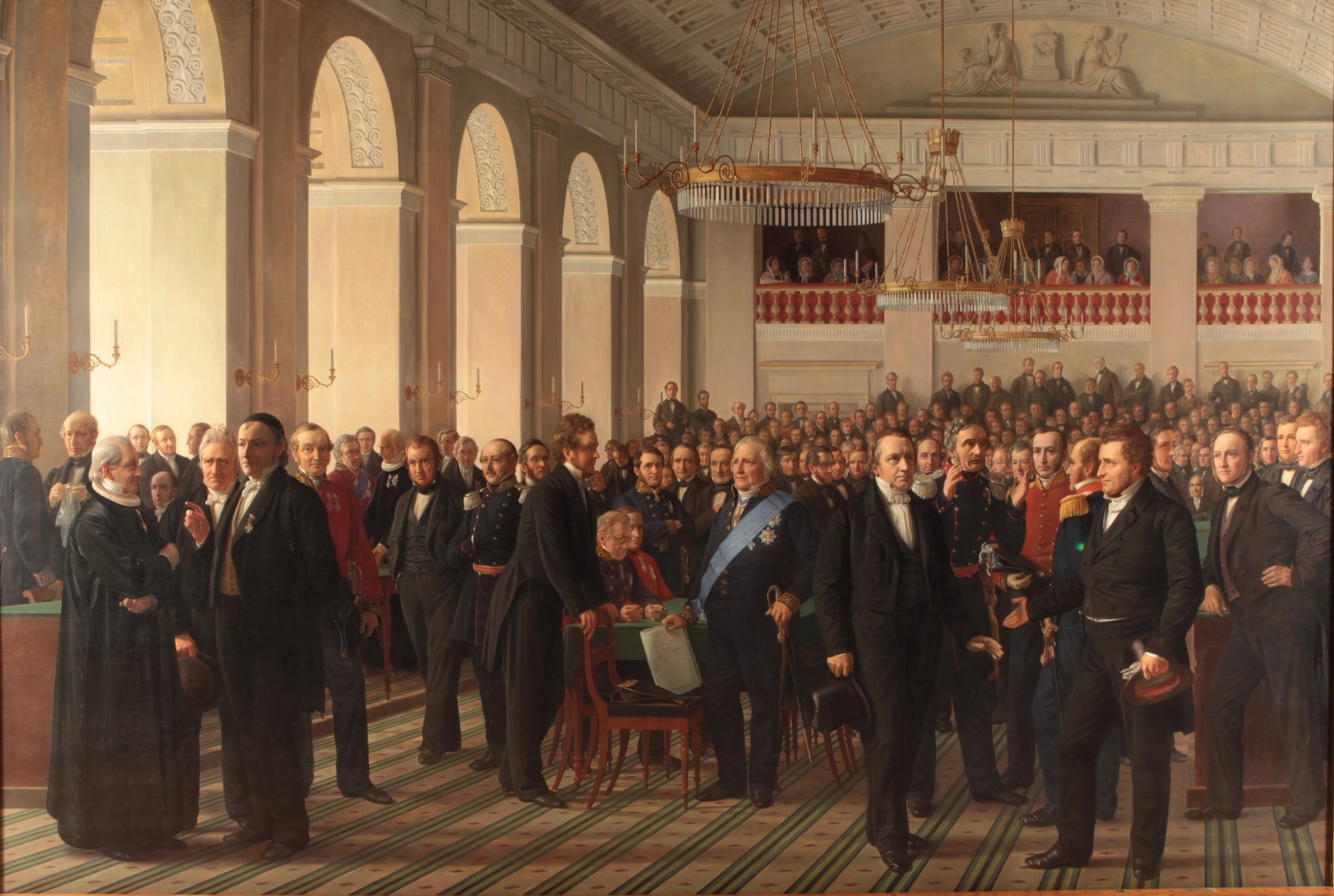
The National Constitutional Assembly, 1849.

Following the Danish Constituent Assembly of 1848 and 1849, the first constitution (which established Denmark as a constitutional monarchy) was signed by King Frederick VII on 5 June 1849. The constitution was completely rewritten in 1866, 1915 (when women's suffrage was introduced), and most recently in 1953, the latter two rewritings also on 5 June.

5 June is also Father's Day in Denmark. It was introduced in 1935, and until 1956 it fell on the second Sunday of November, placing it at the opposite end of the year from Mother's Day on the second Sunday in May. Father's Day was later moved to its current date since Constitution Day was a half-day off work.

== See also ==
- 2019 Danish general election – on 5 June 2019
- International Workers' Day in Denmark – on 1 May, which is also celebrated with gatherings and political speeches
- Public holidays in Denmark
- Valdemarsdag – on 15 June, another day often considered to be Denmark's national day
