= Birgit Kleis =

Danish politician (born 1956)

High Commissioner of the Faroe Islands
- Incumbent
- Assumed office 1 November 2001
- Monarch: Margrethe II
- Preceded by: Vibeke Larsen

Personal details
- Born: 3 November 1956 (age 69) Denmark
- Occupation: Politician

Birgit Kleis (born November 3, 1956) is a Danish politician from Hellerup. She served as the High Commissioner of the Faroe Islands from 1 November 2001 – 1 August 2005.
