= Dan Michael Knudsen =

Faroese politician (born 1962)

High Commissioner of the Faroe Islands
- In office 1 January 2008 – 9 May 2017
- Preceded by: Søren Christensen
- Succeeded by: Lene Moyell Johansen

Personal details
- Born: 2 March 1962 (age 64) Vejle, Denmark
- Occupation: Civil Servant
- Profession: Economist

Dan Michael Knudsen (born 2 March 1962) is a former High Commissioner of the Faroe Islands (Rigsombudsmanden på Færøerne) until 2017. Knudsen was appointed to the office in 2008, succeeding Søren Christensen. He previously worked in the Department of Finance in the Faroese Home Rule Government, 1997–2000:

- 2005–2007 Specialist consultant, the High Commissioner of the Faroe Islands
- 2000–2005 Head of Section, the High Commissioner of the Faroe Islands
- 1997–2000 Head of Section, the Faroese Home Rule Government, Department of Finance

As High Commissioner he drew up an annual report on the condition of Faroese society and reported to the Danish Prime Minister, whilst representing the Queen in the territory of the Faroe Islands

== Personal ==
Knudsen graduated with a master's degree in Social Economics from University of Southern Denmark, Odense in 1997.

== Sources ==
- Information on the High Commissioner from the official Danish Prime Minister website.
