= Lene Moyell Johansen =

Danish lawyer (born 1968)

High Commissioner of the Faroe Islands
- Incumbent
- Assumed office 15 May 2017
- Monarchs: Margrethe II; Frederik X
- Preceded by: Dan Michael Knudsen

Personal details
- Born: 19 December 1968 (age 57) Denmark
- Education: University of Copenhagen
- Occupation: Civil Servant
- Profession: Lawyer

Lene Moyell Johansen (born 19 December 1968) is a Danish lawyer who has been the Danish High Commissioner in the Faroe Islands since 2017.

Lene Moyell Johansen holds a Candidate of Law degree from the University of Copenhagen awarded in 2003, and served as a regional government lawyer in the Roskilde County administration.

Moyell Johansen began working in the Danish High Commissioner in the Faroe Islands' office in 2008, where she was put in charge of individual and family law from 2011. Later, she concurrently functioned as Deputy High Commissioner.

Following a vacancy in office in spring 2017, she first briefly served as Acting High Commissioner, before being appointed the new High Commissioner by the Løkke Rasmussen Cabinet, with a full six year term beginning 1 August 2017. Her commission was renewed by the Frederiksen Cabinet for a second term beginning 1 August 2023.
