= List of high commissioners of the Faroe Islands =

The high commissioner of the Faroe Islands is the chief representative of the King of Denmark and Government of the Kingdom of Denmark in the Faroe Islands, which has internal self-government. The Danish title is Rigsombudsmand. The high commissioner has a seat in the Faroese Løgting (parliament), where they are allowed to speak but not allowed to vote.

Name	Born	Died	Entered office	Left office
Cai A. Vagn-Hansen	1911	1990	1948	1954
Niels Elkær-Hansen	1915	2007	1954	1961
Mogens Wahl	1918	1986	1961	1972
Leif Groth	1930	2009	1972	1981
Niels Bentsen	1936	2017	1981	1988
Bent Klinte	1939	2012	1988	1995
Vibeke Larsen	1944		30 June 1996	1 November 2001
Birgit Kleis	1956		1 November 2001	1 August 2005
Søren Christensen	1940		1 August 2005	1 January 2008
Dan M. Knudsen	1962		1 January 2008	9 May 2017
Lene Moyell Johansen	1968		15 May 2017	Incumbent
