= Kim Dirks =

Professor of civil and environmental engineering in New Zealand

Academic background
- Education: University of Auckland, McGill University
- Thesis: Modelling the effect of wind and vehicle flow on exhaust dispersion at two traffic intersections in Hamilton, New Zealand (2001)
- Doctoral advisor: John E. Hay

Kim Natasha Dirks is a Canadian–New Zealand academic, and is a full professor at the University of Auckland, specialising in infrastructure impacts on population health.

== Early life and education ==
Dirks grew up near Montreal, Canada, and initially trained in physics and meteorology, before moving to New Zealand. She has a Bachelor degree from McGill University, and completed a Master of Science and a PhD at the University of Auckland. Her doctoral thesis was on modelling air pollution, and was completed in 2001.

== Academic career ==
Dirks then joined the Faculty of Medical and Health Sciences at the University of Auckland. Researching the health impacts of air pollution at the population level led Dirks to realise the impact of urban infrastructure on people's exposure to pollution. "The urban infrastructure influences how people spend their time and move about. At a medical faculty, I was able to come up with ways to improve people’s health, but it was much more difficult to influence the decisions being made about the provision of infrastructure", she said. Dirks then moved to the Faculty of Engineering at Auckland, where she considered she had a greater chance to create change, and where as of 2024 she is a full professor.

Dirks's research covers the link between infrastructure and health. Dirks and her students have researched the barriers to cycling in Auckland, in comparison to a similar study done ten years prior. She has also investigated how access to green space, which has positive health impacts, can be maintained in denser cities, and co-authored research showing that the microplastics in Auckland's atmosphere equate to three million plastics bottles per year. The levels of microplastics in Auckland were much higher than those found in other major cities around the world. Dirks has also looked at how exposure to noise affects health and wellbeing.

Dirks is a member of the Te Manahua New Zealand Universities Women in Leadership Programme working group.

== Selected works ==
- Salmond, Jennifer; Marc Tadaki; Sotiris Vardoulakis; et al. (2016). "Health and climate related ecosystem services provided by street trees in the urban environment". Environmental Health. 15 Suppl 1 (S1): 36. doi:10.1186/s12940-016-0103-6. PMC 4895605. PMID 26961700. Wikidata Q28069860.
- Shepherd, Daniel; McBride, David Iain; Welch, David; Dirks, Kim Natasha; Erin M Hill (2011). "Evaluating the impact of wind turbine noise on health-related quality of life". Noise & Health. 13 (54): 333–339. doi:10.4103/1463-1741.85502. PMID 21959113. Wikidata Q34035338.
- S.G. Bradley; K.N. Dirks; C.D. Stow (1998). "High resolution studies of rainfall on Norfolk Island, Part III: A model for rainfall redistribution". Journal of Hydrology. 208 (3–4): 194–203. doi:10.1016/s0022-1694(98)00156-5. Wikidata Q124432537.
- Salmond, Jennifer; D E Williams; G Laing; Kingham, Simon Paul; Dirks, Kim Natasha; I Longley; G S Henshaw (2012). "The influence of vegetation on the horizontal and vertical distribution of pollutants in a street canyon". Science of the Total Environment. 443: 287–298. doi:10.1016/j.scitotenv.2012.10.101. PMID 23201695. Wikidata Q40077938.
- Shepherd, Daniel; Welch, David; Dirks, Kim Natasha; Renata Mathews (2010). "Exploring the relationship between noise sensitivity, annoyance and health-related quality of life in a sample of adults exposed to environmental noise". International Journal of Environmental Research and Public Health. 7 (10): 3579–3594. doi:10.3390/ijerph7103580. PMC 2996181. PMID 21139850. Wikidata Q30478296.
- Jinsong Chen; Bullen, Christopher; Dirks, Kim Natasha (2017). "A Comparative Health Risk Assessment of Electronic Cigarettes and Conventional Cigarettes". International Journal of Environmental Research and Public Health. 14 (4). doi:10.3390/ijerph14040382. PMC 5409583. PMID 28379177. Wikidata Q33616096.
- Stanley, Margaret; Beggs, Jacqueline Rae; Imogen E Bassett; Burns, Bruce; Dirks, Kim Natasha; Jones, Darryl; Linklater, Wayne Leslie; MacInnis, Catriona; Robyn Simcock; Gayle Souter-Brown; Sam A Trowsdale; Kevin J Gaston (2015). "Emerging threats in urban ecosystems: a horizon scanning exercise". Frontiers in Ecology and the Environment. 13 (10): 553–560. doi:10.1890/150229. Wikidata Q57066172.
