= David Ozonoff =

David Michael Ozonoff is the Chair Emeritus of Environmental Health and Professor Emeritus at Boston University School of Public Health, Co-Editor-in-Chief of the online journal, Environmental Health and Professor, Sociomedical Sciences, at Boston University School of Medicine and a trichloroethylene expert.

== Education ==
Ozonoff earned his MD from Cornell University, MPH from Johns Hopkins University, and BS from the University of Wisconsin-Madison.

== Career ==
Ozonoff began his career at the BUSPH in 1977 as the first chair of the Department of Environmental Health, a position he held until 2003. He retired in June 2020.

He was " Director of the Superfund Basic Research Program—a multidisciplinary effort, funded by the National Institute of Environmental Health Sciences, to understand basic scientific problems connected with the federal Superfund Program.",

When he wanted to work for the World Health Organization, he refused to take the loyalty check that the American government performs by agreement with WHO and under the terms of Executive Order No. 10422, 18 Fed.Reg. 239 (Jan. 9, 1953), reprinted as amended at 22 U.S.C. § 287. The U.S. Court of Appeals for the First Circuit affirmed the District Court's decision that it violated his First Amendment rights and invalided the Order.

== Selected publications ==
- "Fewer resources now," opinion in "Swine Flu: A Cause for Panic?" The New York Times, 2009 Apr 27.
- "Quality and value: statistics in peer review," Peer-to-Peer, Nature.com, 2006 Jun 14.
- "Epistemology in the courtroom: a little 'knowledge' is a dangerous thing," American Journal of Public Health, Supplement, 2005 Jul; 95(S1): S13-S15.
- "Legal causation and responsibility for causing harm," American Journal of Public Health, Supplement, 2005 Jul; 95(S11):S35-S38.
- "Ticket to ride: spreading germs a mile high" (with L Pepper), The Lancet, 2005 Mar 12–18; 365(9463):989-996.
- "Implications of the Precautionary Principle in research and policy-making" (with P Grandjean, JC Bailar, D Gee, HL Needleman, E Richter, M Sofritti, & CL Soskolne), American Journal of Industrial Medicine, 2004 Apr; 45(4):382-385.
- "Anthrax: the precautionary principle goes postal," Public Health Reports, 2002 Nov-Dec; 117(6):513-20.
- "Superfund Basic Research Program: a model for contemporary research programs," Environmental Health Perspectives, 2003; 111:A140-A141.
- "Neuropsychological functioning in Danish Gulf War veterans" (with SP Proctor, RF White, T Heeren, F Debes, B Gloerfelt-Tarp, M Appleyard, T Ishoy, B Guldager, P Suadicani & F Gyntelberg), Journal of Psychopathology Behavioral Assessment, 2003 Jun; 25(2):85-93.
- "Collaborating on public health issues" (with A Robbins), Science, 2002 May 24; 296(5572):1400. Letter.
- "Health toll of the Middle East crisis," The Lancet, 2002 May 25; 359(9320):1859-1860.
- "Neuropsychological function in Gulf War veterans: relationships to self-reported toxicant exposures" (with RF White, SP Proctor, T Heeren, J Wolfe, M Krengel, J Vasterling, K Lindem, KJ Heaton & P Sutker), American Journal of Industrial Medicine, 2001 Jul; 40(1):42-54.
- "Where the boys aren't: dioxin and the sex ratio" (with R Clapp), The Lancet, 2000 May; 355(9218):1838-1839.
- "Tetrachloroethylene-contaminated drinking water in Massachusetts and the risk of colon-rectum, lung, and other cancers" (with C Paulu & A Aschengrau), Environmental Health Perspectives, 1999 Apr; 107(4):265-271.
- "Cancer survival is no lottery" (with R Clapp), The Lancet 1999 Apr 24;353(9162):1379-80.
- "Integrating values into science: the view of an unreconstructed philosophical realist," Human Ecology Review, 1998; 5(1):49-50.
- "The uses and misuses of skepticism: epidemiology and its critics," Public Health Reports, 1998; 111:321,323.
- "Environmental health," Chapter 9 in J Noble, ed., Textbook of General Medicine and Primary Care (Little-Brown, 1987).
- "An attack on 'A defense of vitalism'," Journal of Theoretical Biology, 1969 Jan; 24(1):121-122.
