= Whaling foreman =

Figure in the Faroese pilot whale hunt

The whaling foreman is in Faroese known as a grindaformaður. He is a central figure in the Faroese pilot whale hunt.

He has the following responsibilities in a hunt:

- He is responsible for organising the pilot whale drives
- He makes sure the word spreads when pilot whales are sighted close to land
- He makes sure that there are enough boats to drive the whales, and that there are enough people on shore to help out.

== See also ==
- Whaling in the Faroe Islands
