= Margaret Stanley =

Margaret Stanley may refer to:

- Margaret Stanley (ecologist), New Zealand ecology professor
- Margaret Stanley (virologist), British virologist and epithelial biologist
- Margaret Beaufort, Countess of Richmond and Derby (1443–1509), married name Margaret Stanley, mother of Henry VII of England
- Margaret Stanley, Countess of Derby (1540–1596), great-granddaughter of Henry VII of England
