= Jennifer Salmond =

New Zealand geographer

- Born: Jennifer Ann Salmond

Academic background
- Education: University of British Columbia, University of Oxford, University of Birmingham
- Thesis: Vertical mixing of ozone in the very stable nocturnal boundary layer (2001)
- Doctoral advisor: Ian G. McKendry

Jennifer Ann Salmond is a New Zealand academic, and is professor of geography at the University of Auckland, specialising in urban air pollution measurement and mitigation.

== Academic career ==
Salmond obtained a Master of Arts from the University of Oxford, followed by a Master of Science at the University of Birmingham. She then completed a PhD titled Vertical mixing of ozone in the very stable nocturnal boundary layer at the University of British Columbia. Salmond then joined the faculty of the University of Auckland, rising to full professor. Salmond is co-Chair of the international urban environmental health consortium Healthy-Polis. She was Vice President for the Auckland branch of the New Zealand Meteorological Society from 2009 to 2016, and has held several roles on the board of the International Association for Urban Climate.

Salmond's research focuses on urban air pollution. She is interested in the causes of urban air pollution, the risks to people from exposure to it, and ways to mitigate it, for instance through urban design or monitoring systems that encourage behaviour change on high pollution days. She has researched instrumentation, measurement and modelling. As part of a Ministry of Business, Innovation and Employment Endeavour grant, Salmond has also been examining the risk of exposure to erionite during excavations in Auckland. Erionite is known to be present in Auckland soils, and exposure is associated with mesothelioma. As either principal researcher or co-lead researcher she has received more than $15 million of research funding.

== Selected works ==
- Salmond, Jennifer; Marc Tadaki; Sotiris Vardoulakis; et al. (2016). "Health and climate related ecosystem services provided by street trees in the urban environment". Environmental Health. 15 Suppl 1 (S1): 36. doi:10.1186/s12940-016-0103-6. PMC 4895605. PMID 26961700. Wikidata Q28069860.
- M. W. Rotach; R. Vogt; C. Bernhofer; et al. (2005). "BUBBLE – an Urban Boundary Layer Meteorology Project". Theoretical and Applied Climatology. 81 (3–4): 231–261. Bibcode:2005ThApC..81..231R. doi:10.1007/s00704-004-0117-9. Wikidata Q59730601.
- Grimmond, Sue; Salmond, Jennifer; Oke, Timothy Richard; B. Offerle; A. Lemonsu (2004). "Flux and turbulence measurements at a densely built-up site in Marseille: Heat, mass (water and carbon dioxide), and momentum". Journal of Geophysical Research. 109 (D24). Bibcode:2004JGRD..10924101G. doi:10.1029/2004jd004936. Wikidata Q58319166.
- Salmond, Jennifer; D E Williams; G Laing; Kingham, Simon Paul; Dirks, Kim Natasha; I Longley; G S Henshaw (2012). "The influence of vegetation on the horizontal and vertical distribution of pollutants in a street canyon". Science of the Total Environment. 443: 287–298. doi:10.1016/j.scitotenv.2012.10.101. PMID 23201695. Wikidata Q40077938.
- Salmond, Jennifer; I. G. McKendry (2005). "A review of turbulence in the very stable nocturnal boundary layer and its implications for air quality". Progress in Physical Geography. 29 (2): 171–188. doi:10.1191/0309133305pp442ra. Wikidata Q59730587.
