= George Seage =

Epidemiologist

George Richard Seage III (March 11, 1957 – January 2, 2021) was an American epidemiologist and a professor at the Harvard T.H. Chan School of Public Health and Director of the school's Program in the Epidemiology of Infectious Diseases. Seage specialized in HIV/AIDS research with a focus on “the behavioural and biological aspects of adult and pediatric HIV transmission, natural history and treatment.” At the Boston University School of Public Health (BUSPH), Seage was an Adjunct Associate Professor of Epidemiology in the Department of Epidemiology, Director of the Interdisciplinary Concentration in the Epidemiology of Infectious Diseases, and Director of the Pediatric AIDS Cohort Study (PHACS) data and analysis center.

== Biography ==
Seage was born in Bethpage, New York, to George R. and Lorraine Angelikas Seage. He was raised in Massapequa Park, New York.

He graduated from Berner High School, earned a ScD and MPH from Boston University School of Public Health and BS in biology from Stony Brook University.

Seage died from Acute myeloid leukemia on January 2, 2021. He is survived by his parents, wife Ann Aschengrau and son Greg.

== Research ==
Seage “has been the Principal Investigator of a number of studies that have elucidated the biological and behavioral factors associated with HIV transmission, acquisition, and prevention–including the Boston Partners Study (BPS), the Boston Young Men's Study (BYMS), and the HIV Network of Prevention Trials Vaccine Preparedness Study (HIVNET VPS). He was subsequently the Principal Investigator for the Pediatric HIV/AIDS Cohort Study (PHACS), Data and Operations Center, a multidisciplinary initiative co-funded by eight NIH Institutes, PI of an NIH RO1 “Modeling the effect of the Botswana Combination HIV Prevention Project” - and was the Program Director of one of the few NIH training grants in infectious disease epidemiology and biodefense.”

== Awards and honors ==
Seage has received the Massachusetts Governor's Award for Outstanding Contributions to AIDS Research and Fenway Community Health Center Research Award.

== Selected publications ==
- Murray, Eleanor J.; Robins, James M.; Seage, George R.; Freedberg, Kenneth A.; Hernán, Miguel A. (2017-06-30). "A Comparison of Agent-Based Models and the Parametric G-Formula for Causal Inference". American Journal of Epidemiology. 186 (2): 131–142. doi:10.1093/aje/kwx091. ISSN 0002-9262. PMC 5860229. PMID 28838064.
- Essentials of Epidemiology in Public Health textbook; coauthor Ann Aschengrau Boston University School of Public Health
