= Whaling in the Faroe Islands =

Faroese drive hunting of whales and dolphins

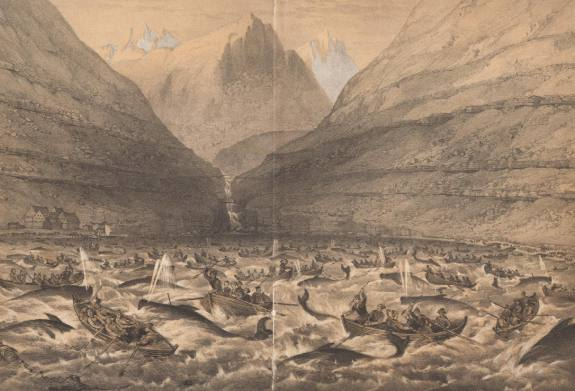
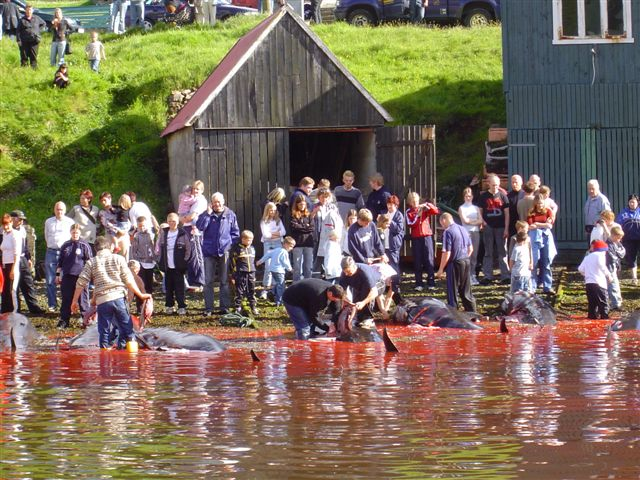
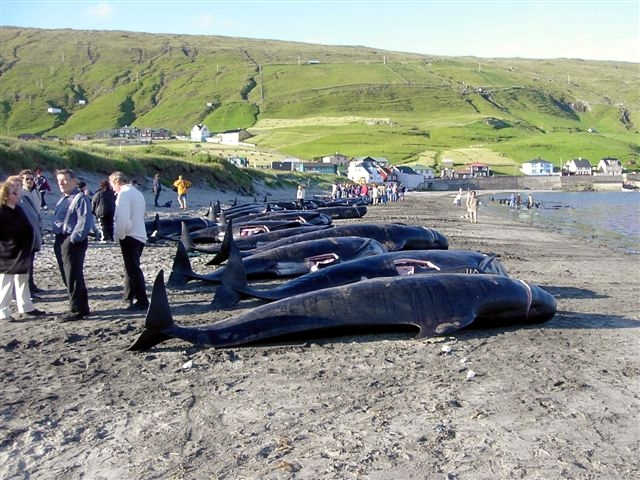
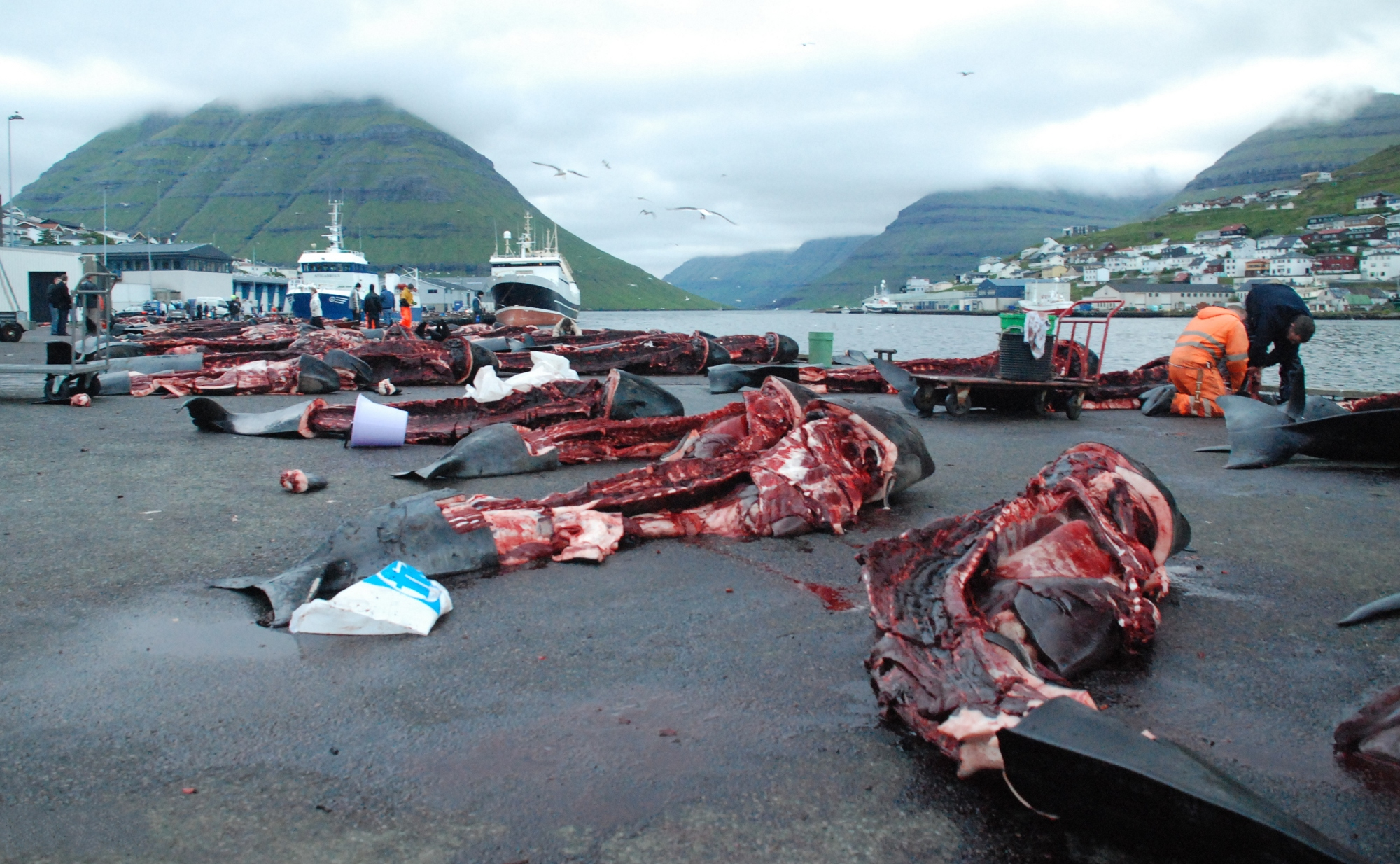
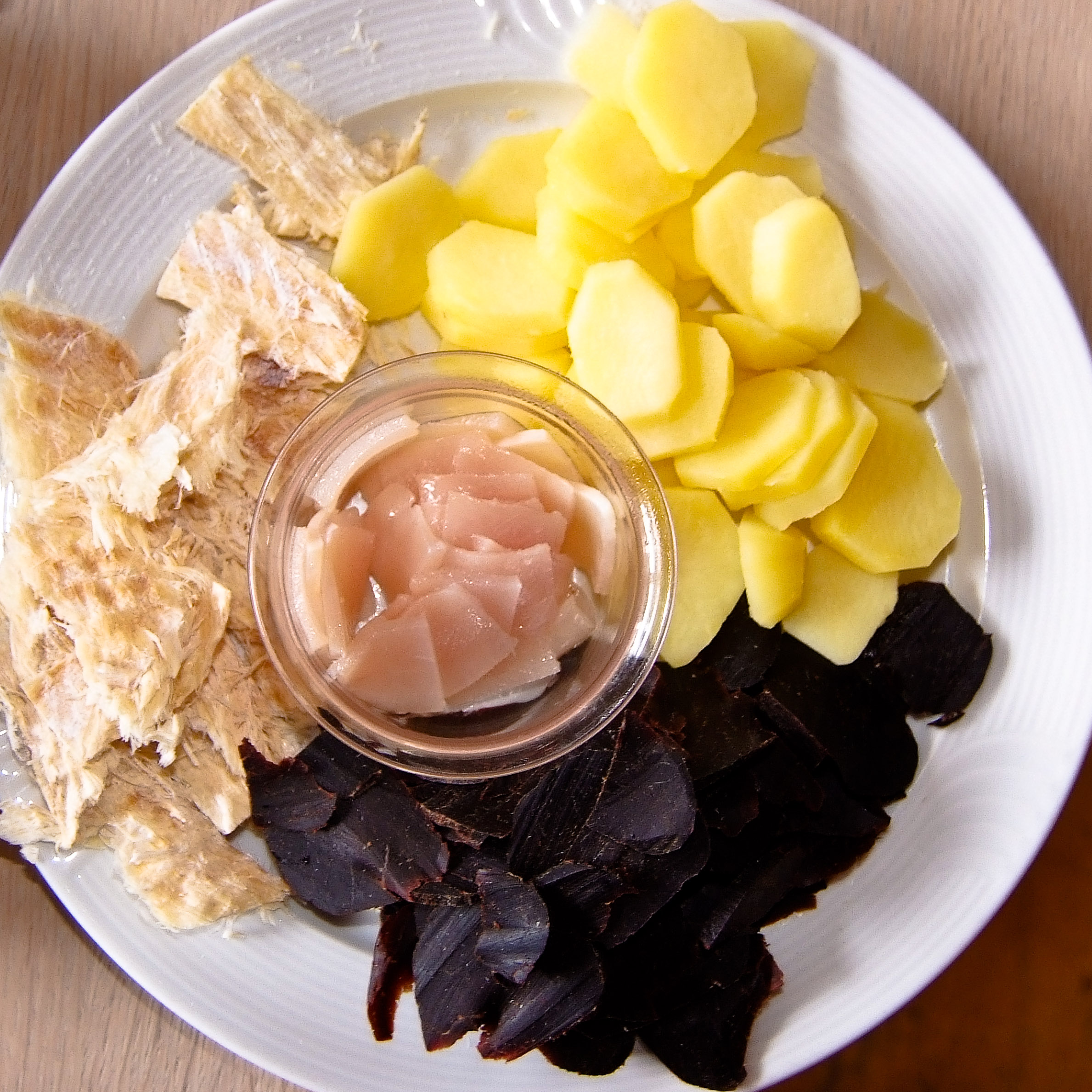
From top to bottom, left to right: illustration of a grindadráp (pilot whale hunt) near Vestmanna (17 June 1854); whale killing in Vágur (28 June 2004); pilot whale carcasses on a beach in Hvalba (2005); whale butchering in Klaksvík (July 2010); tvøst (meat) and spik (blubber) from a pilot whale, with fish and potatoes.

Whaling in the Faroe Islands, or grindadráp (from the Faroese terms grindhvalur, meaning pilot whale, and dráp, meaning killing), is a type of drive hunting that involves herding various species of whales and dolphins, but primarily pilot whales, into shallow bays to be beached, killed, and butchered. Each year, an average of around 700 long-finned pilot whales are caught, alongside varying numbers of Atlantic white-sided dolphins.

The practice dates back to the 9th century, and many Faroe Islanders consider eating whales to be an important part of their history. Since 1948, the hunt has been regulated by the Faroese authorities, required its participants to be trained, involved modern boats and communications, and been supervised by police.

The hunt has been under increasing scrutiny since the 1980s. Domestically, concerns have arisen over the potential toxicity of whale meat, particularly for young children and pregnant women. Internationally, animal rights groups, who consider the hunts cruel and unnecessary, have targeted them with protests, boycotts, and occasional direct interventions.

== History ==
The evidence for whaling on the Faroe Islands dates back to the early days of Norse settlement (800–900 AD) during the Viking Age. After 999 AD, when Sigmundur Brestisson brought Christianity to the Faroes, the islanders began keeping records of their whale kills for the purpose of the taxes due to the King of Norway. There is archaeological evidence of whaling in the form of pilot whale bones found in household remains dating back to around 1200 AD, and laws regulating the whale hunt appear in the 1298 Sheep Letter. Written records of whale kills survive from 1584, and the statistical records are considered particularly reliable from 1709 to the present.

The 20th century saw increased regulation of Faroese whaling. On 4 June 1907, the Danish amtmaður (governor) and sýslumaður (sheriff) sent the first draft for whaling regulations to the Danish authorities in Copenhagen, and in 1932 the first modern whaling legislation was introduced. As a part of the Home Rule act of 1948, the powers relating to legislating on and regulating fishing and hunting on the Faroes were transferred from the Danish Parliament to the Faroese Parliament. The 21st century has seen ongoing regulation alongside a Faroese whaling culture revival both as part of "an international preoccupation with reclaiming, preserving and reconstituting the past" and a national and local "quest for defining identity".

== The whale hunt ==
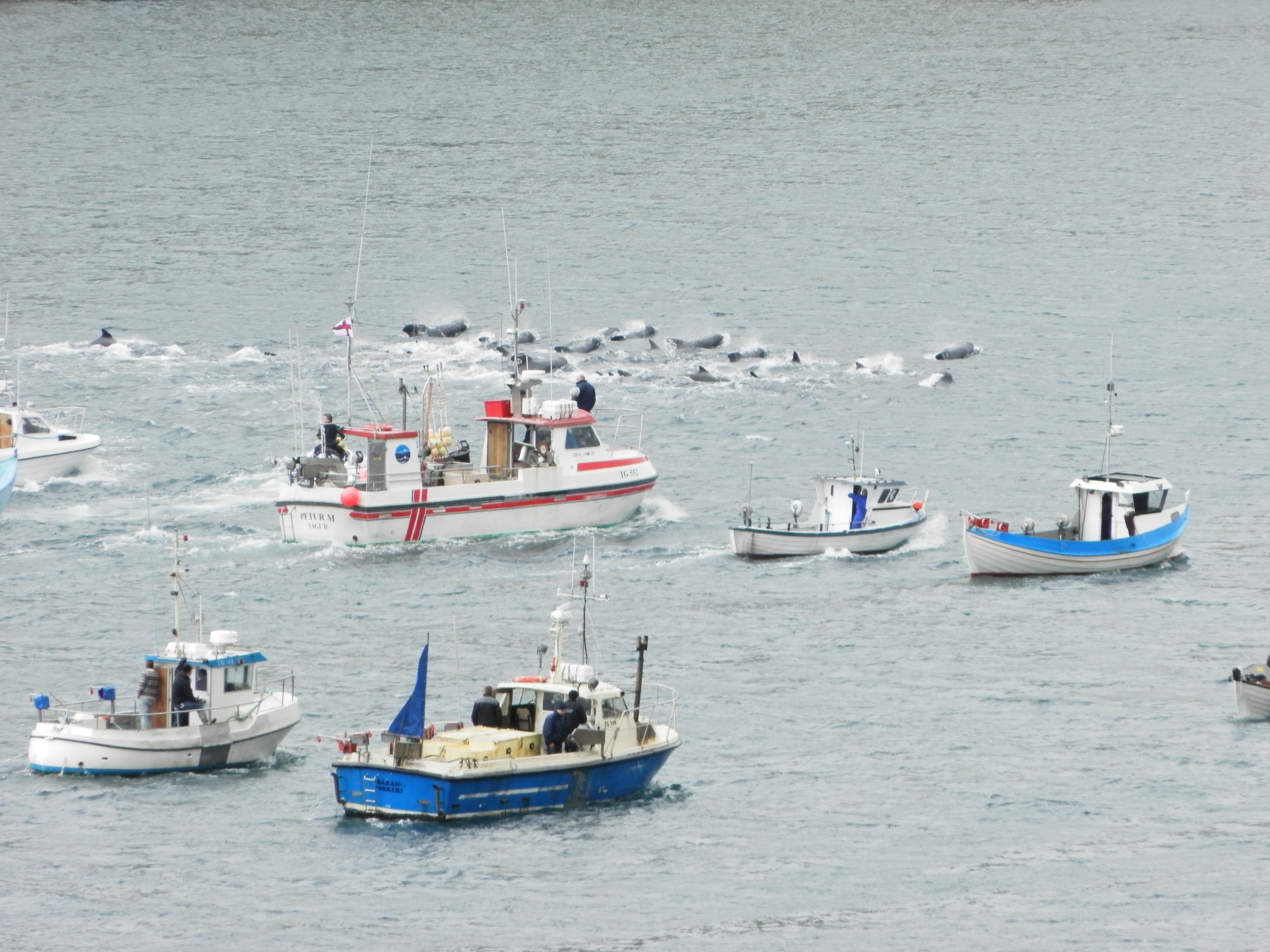
Boats head out on a pilot whale hunt in Vágur, Suðuroy, in August 2012.

There are no fixed hunting seasons, but whale hunts are likely to happen during spring and summer periods, from June to October. Whale drives only take place when sea and weather conditions permit. When the men hear of a grindaboð (a whale pod spotted close to shore), and after approval from the sýslumaður, the fishermen already at sea head towards the whales and wait for others to arrive. Women usually do not actively take part in the whale hunt, but support it as bystanders or onlookers.

Whaling regulations specify how the school of whales is to be driven ashore, and the drive works by surrounding the pilot whales with a wide semicircle of boats. On the signal of the whale hunt foremen, stones attached to lines are thrown into the water behind the pilot whales to prevent their escape and the boats drive the whales towards an authorised beach or fjord, where the animals are driven to beach themselves. In older times, the boats which were used to the whale hunt were traditional wooden rowing boats known as grindabátarnir; today they use wooden or fibreglass boats with engines. In the village of Vágur however they have preserved ten traditional whaling boats, the oldest dating back to 1873. These boats are still in use, but for pleasure trips.

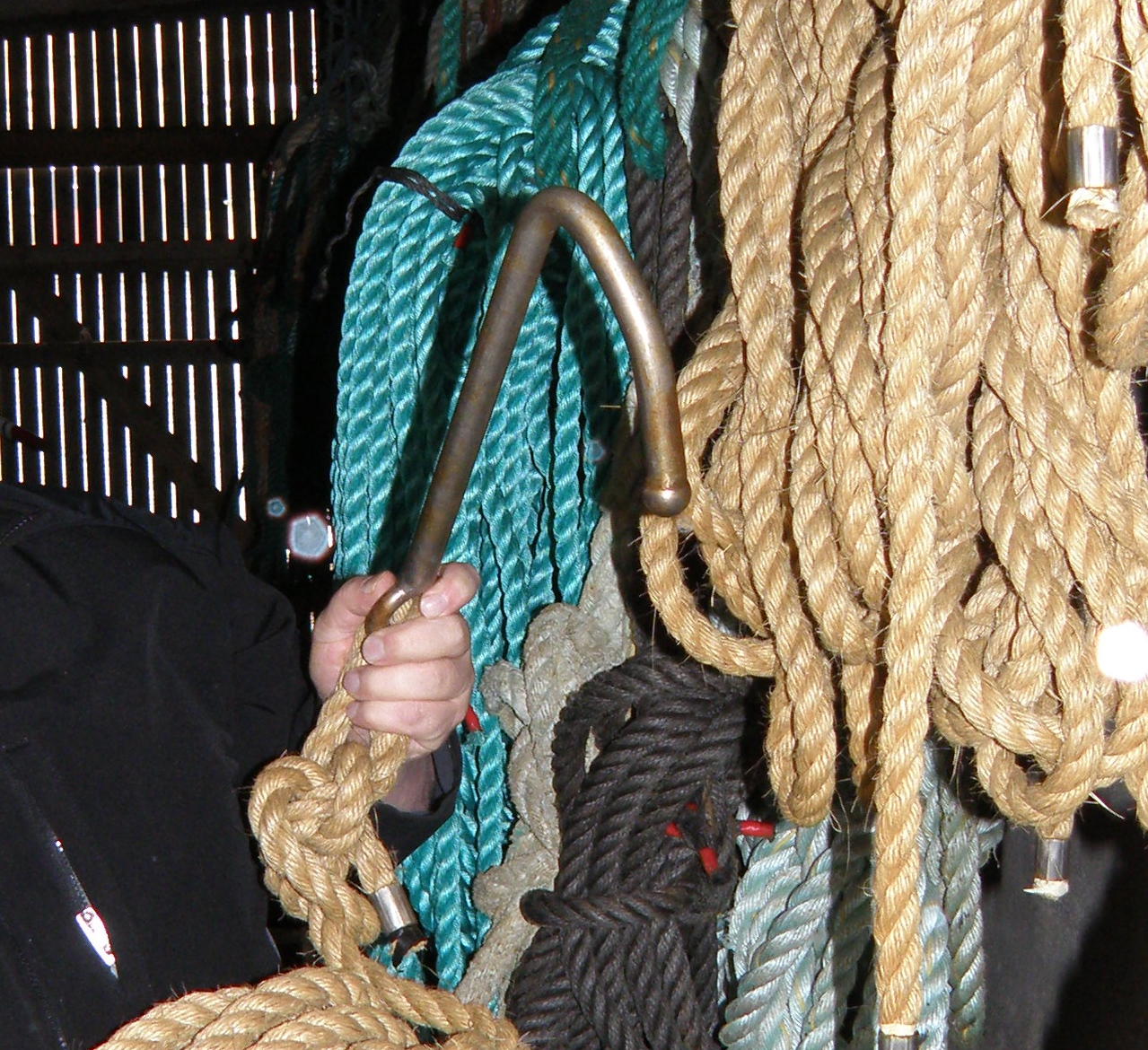
A blunt gaff, or Blásturongul, for use in dragging whales further up the beach by their blowholes

Once beached, the pilot whales are killed by a single deep cut through the dorsal area made with a special whaling knife, a mønustingari that severs the spinal cord. The mønustingari began to be used in 2011, and became a legal requirement in 2015. After the whales are confirmed to be dead, their necks are cut open with a grindaknívur, so that as much blood as possible can run from the whale in order to better preserve the meat.

The pilot whales that are not beached were historically stabbed in the blubber with a sharp hook, called a sóknarongul (a kind of gaff), and then pulled ashore. In 1993, a blunt gaff or blásturongul was invented that could be used to hold the beached whales steady by their blowholes and pull them ashore. In 1985, the Faroe Islands outlawed the use of spears (skutil) and harpoons (hvalvákn) in the hunt, as these weapons were considered to be unnecessarily cruel to the whales. According to the 2013 Whale Hunt Law, whales must be either ashore or stuck on the seabed before they can lawfully be killed, and, as of 26 January 2017, only the men waiting on the beaches with blásturkrókur, mønustingari and grindaknívur are permitted to kill the whales, and it is no longer permitted to harpoon the whales while at sea, or hook those outside of the encircling net.

=== Hunted species and populations ===
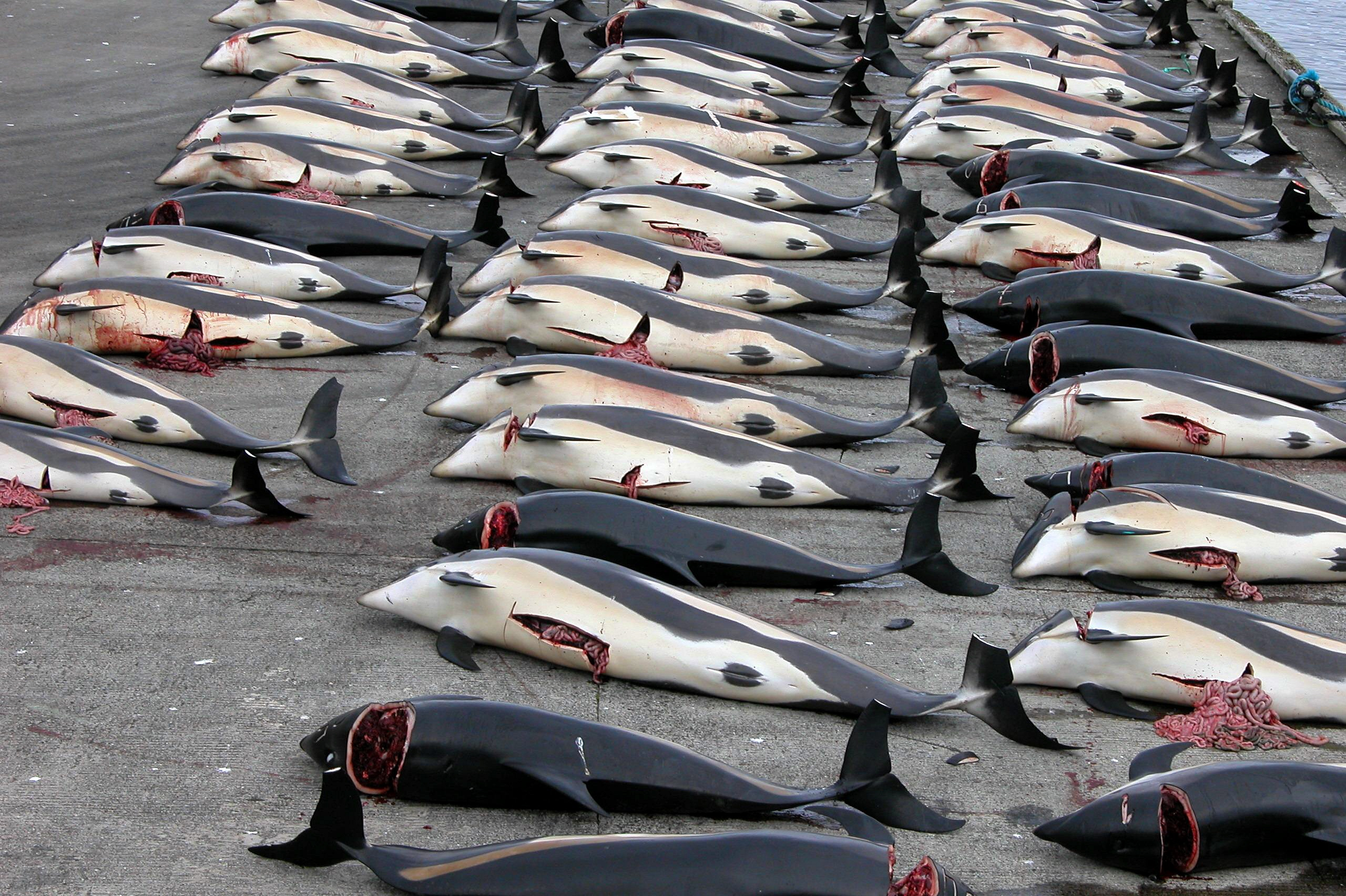
White-sided dolphin carcasses laid out in Hvalba in August 2006

The main target of the Faroese whale hunt is the long-finned pilot whale. In 1993, it was estimated that there were a total of 780,000 short and long-finned pilot whales in the North Atlantic. The study combined both as they are hard to distinguish at sea. The North Atlantic Marine Mammal Commission has noted that there is little current information on the abundance of pilot whales in the North Atlantic. The American Cetacean Society (ACS) has estimated that there may be as many as one million long-finned pilot whales and 200,000 short finned animals. The International Union for Conservation of Nature (IUCN), in its Red List of Threatened Species, rates both species of pilot whale as "least concern", and has estimated that the long-finned pilot whale subpopulation around the Faroes is around 100,000 individuals and that the Faroese catch is "likely sustainable".

According to Faroese legislation, it is also permitted to hunt certain species of small cetaceans other than pilot whales. These include the Atlantic white-sided dolphin (Lagenorhynchus acutus), common bottlenose dolphin (Tursiops truncatus), white-beaked dolphin (Lagenorhynchus albirostris), and harbour porpoise (Phocaena phocaena). The hunting of these species is carried out in much the same way as the pilot whale hunt, with the exception of harbour porpoises, which are killed with shotguns. Occasionally, the northern bottlenose whale is also opportunistically killed when individuals stray too close to shore, or, on occasion, are stranded. The hunting of larger whale species (fin and minke whales) ended in 1984 in the Faroe Islands.

=== Impression ===
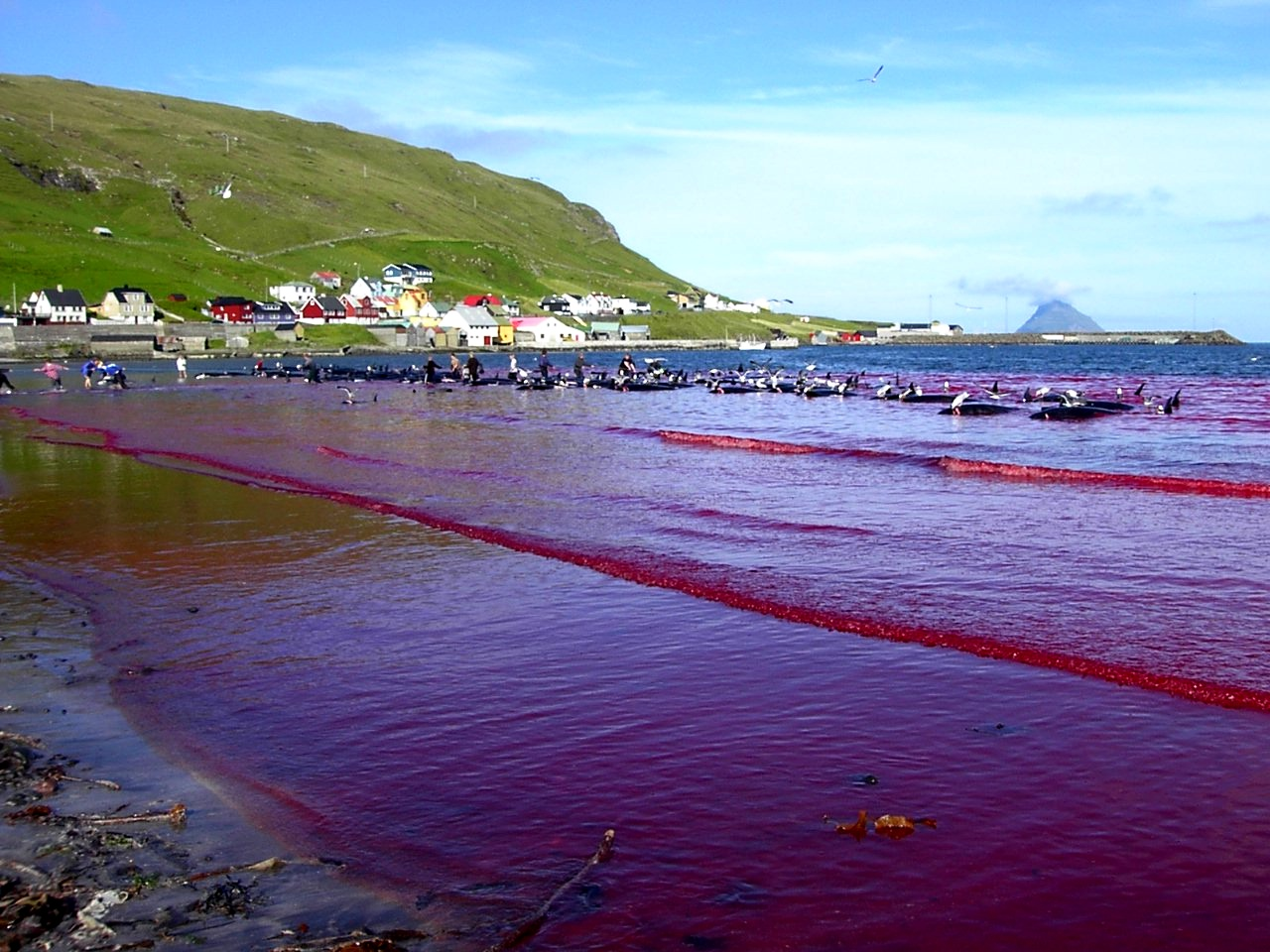
The sea colored blood-red after a pilot whale hunt in Hvalba

As the use of harpoons, spears, and firearms at sea is now prohibited, the whales are now all killed on beaches in full view of spectators. The process, in which a pilot whale's dorsal region is cut, their spine severed and their main arteries opened, is naturally graphic in nature. The entire sea surrounding a whale hunt beaching location tends to turn a bloody red, and this vivid imagery can have a shocking effect on onlookers. In this regard, the whale hunt is not considered a tourism-friendly practice, as compared to, say, the mattanza tuna fishing process in Sicily and Sardinia. In 2006, Ólavur Sjúrðaberg, the chairman of the Faroese Pilot Whalers' Association, said of the pilot whale hunt: "I'm sure that no one who kills his own animals for food is unmoved by what he does. You want it done as quickly and with as little suffering as possible for the animal."

=== Locations ===
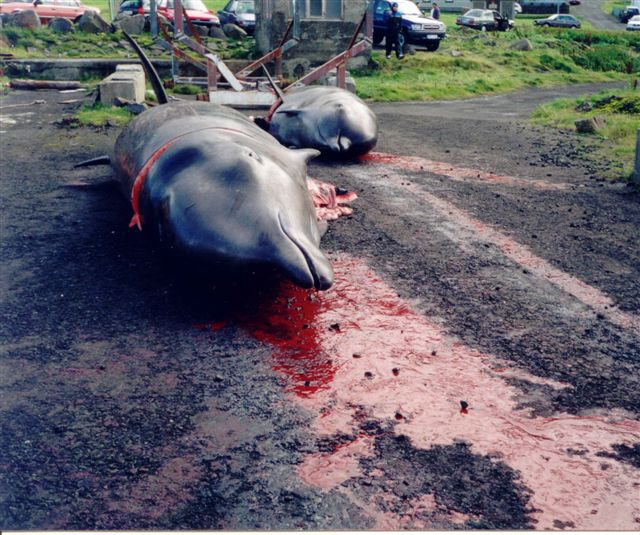
The Northern bottlenose whale is hunted opportunistically, often when stranded (location: Nesin Hvalba bay).

The best locations for whale drives have highly specific "coastal geomorphology", with sandy bottoms, a lack of large rocks or mud, and lack what are known locally as a marbakki, which are sharp land shelves close to shore that whales can see clearly with their echolocation and tend to avoid. At appropriate locations, whales can readily be driven close to or fully ashore, and can sometimes even accidentally strand themselves.

There are close to 30 historic whale hunt locations (hvalvàgir). These include: Bøur, Fámjin, Fuglafjørður, Funningsfjørður, Húsavík, Hvalba (three sites), Hvalvík, Hvannasund, Klaksvík (in both bays), Kollafjørður, Leynar, Miðvágur, Norðragøta, Norðskáli, Sandavágur, Sandur, Syðrugøta, Tjørnuvík, Tórshavn (in Sandagerð), Trongisvágur, Vágur, Vestmanna, Viðvík (near Hvannasund, but on the east coast of Viðoy) and Øravík.

=== Catch statistics ===
Records of the drive exist in part since 1584, and continuously from 1709. Faroese whaling catches have gone through several peaks and troughs in the last century, with notable peaks just before World War II, in the 1950s and 1980s. Each catch is divided into the Faroese 'skinns', a unit of measurement for dividing whale carcasses into combined meat and blubber portions weighing about 75 kg.

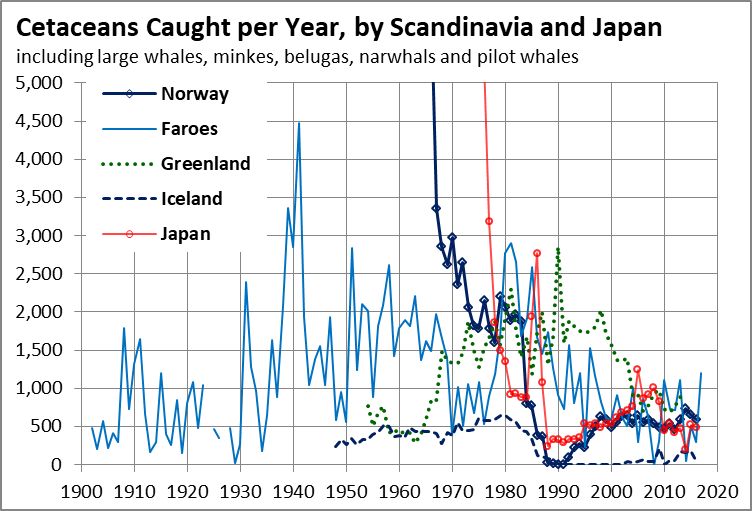
Whale catch trends in different communities

Period	Drives	Whales	Skinn	Drives/Year	Whales/Year	Skinn/Year
1709–1950	1,195	178,259	1,360,160	4.96	738.66	5,643.82
1951–1960	122	18,772	99,102	13.56	2,085.78	11,011.33
1961–1970	130	15,784	79,588	14.44	1,753.78	8,843.11
1971–1980	85	11,311	69,026	9.44	1,256.78	7,669.56
1981–1990	176	18,806	108,714	19.56	2,089.56	12,079.33
1991–2000	101	9,212	66,284	11.22	1,023.56	7,364.89
2001–2010	81	6,265	49,267	9.00	696.11	5,474.11
2011–2016	47	3,394	24,001	9.40	678.80	4,800.20

The largest catch of pilot whales in a single season in recent decades was 1,203 animals in 2017. The average, since 2000, has been 670 animals. In the same period, the average number of white-sided dolphins caught has been 298 animals.

On 15 September 2021, a highly unusual white-sided dolphin hunt took place in which 1,428 were caught and slaughtered in a single day. This was nearly five times the average annual catch of this species and roughly double the previous record number of the animals caught in recent decades. The previous recent record was a total of 773 of the animals caught across the entire season in 2002.

=== Human casualties ===
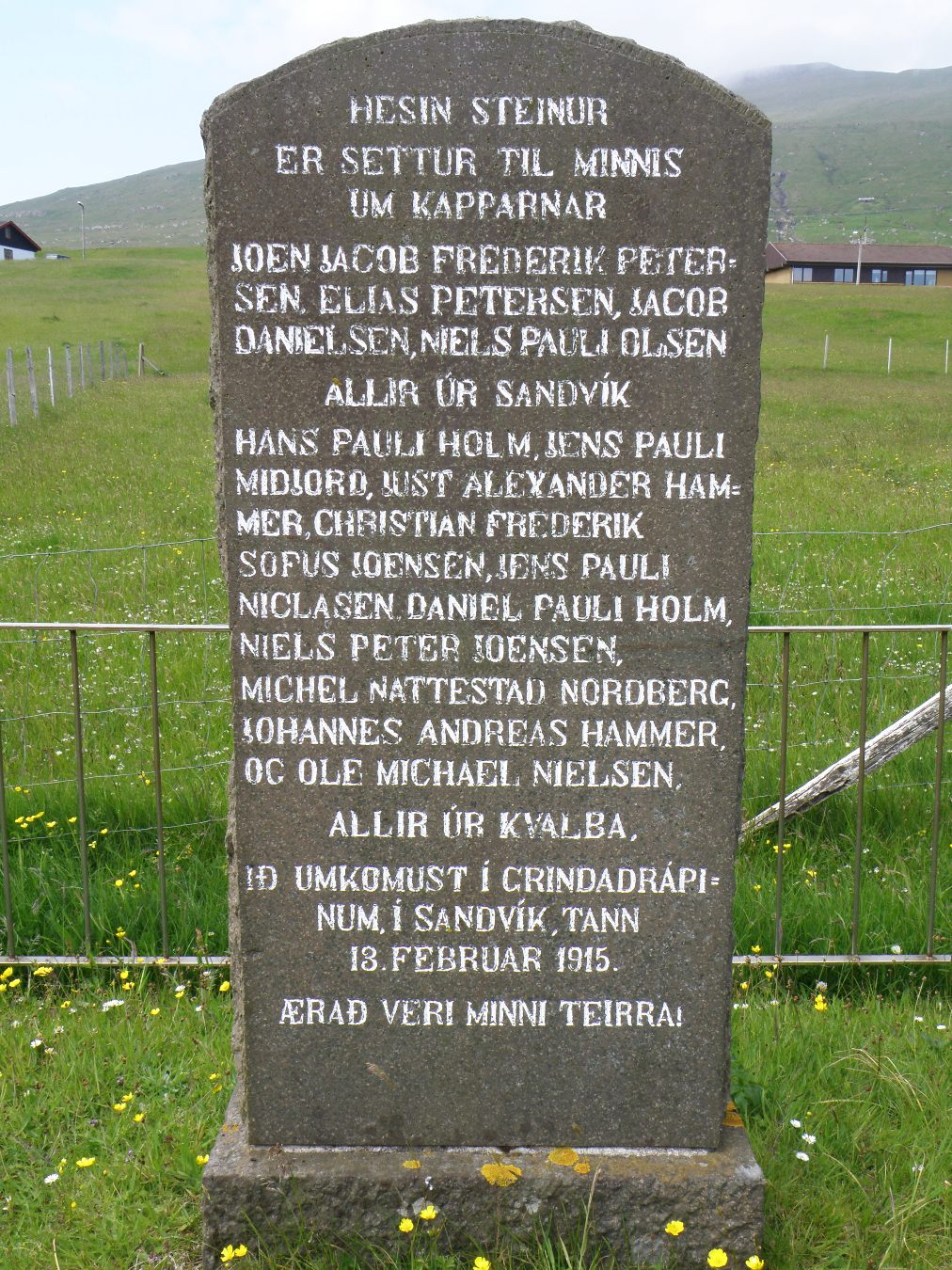
Memorial for The whale hunt catastrophe in Sandvík in 1915

On Saturday 13 February 1915 there was a whale hunt in Sandvík. During the drive, two boats capsized because of rough seas with 15 men on board, fourteen of whom lost their lives, while one was rescued. The men came from the villages Sandvík and Hvalba. The only man who survived the accident, Petur í Køkini, wrote a letter on the following day in which he described the accident and his loss of his son and his brother. The letter begins:

It is with great sorrow, that I must write you these lines. Yesterday we have lost our beloved son [Niels Peter Joensen] during a whaling in Sandvík. The sea was so rough that two boats capsized, 9 men on board one and 6 in the other. I was myself on board one of these boats and was the only one who got rescued. Several times I got loose of the boat and was deep down in the sea, but I kept grabbing the boat again. After a long time a boat came to rescue me. You must not think, that I was just glad to be rescued. It was just because of Mariane [his wife] and the daughters. My brother Hans also died. All together 14 young men and boys like Peter. It is an unbelievable grief, both out where he used to work, and not at least here at home.

== Cultural significance ==
The meat and blubber of the pilot whale are a traditional part of the diet of the Faroese community. Marine mammal blubber has also historically been processed for lamp oil and for medicinal purposes. The skin of pilot whales was once used to make fishing lines and ropes, while their stomachs were used as fishing floats. Other parts of the animals were used to make shoes.

Faroese cuisine is generally dominated by the use of animal products, as only about 2% of the 1,393 km^{2} of land on the islands is at all suitable for arable crops. As a result, during the winter months, the Faroe Islanders traditionally eat mostly salted or dried food, including mutton, fish, seabirds and the meat and blubber from sea mammals.

The pilot whale hunt is also a recurring motif in Faroese literature and art, such as the grindadráp paintings by Sámal Joensen-Mikines, which are exhibited in the Faroese art museum in Tórshavn. Whale hunts were also once celebrated with a traditional cultural dance known as the grindadansur, and in 1835, one Danish governor (amtmand) of the Faroe Islands, Christian Pløyen, published a whaling ballad called the grindavísan. Faroese place names often speak explicitly to whaling culture, such as that of the town of Hvalvík, which means 'whale bay'.

=== Culinary tradition ===
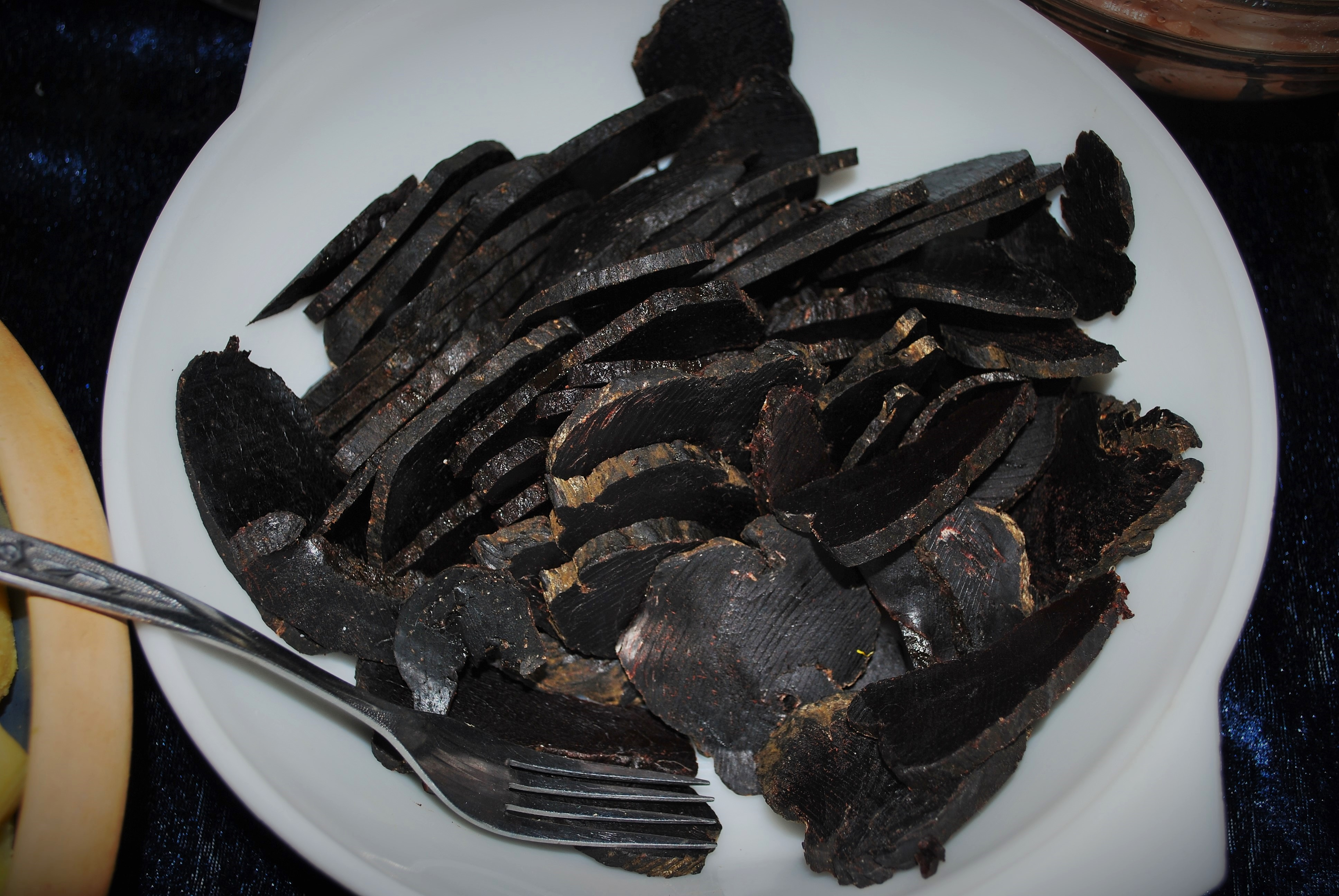
Tvøst. Black meat of the pilot whale

The tradition of eating pilot whale meat and blubber dates back many centuries. Today, it is consumed as a Faroese delicacy. Meat and blubber, Tvøst og spik in Faroese, can be stored and prepared in various ways. When fresh, pilot whale meat can be served as a steak called a grindabúffur. Meat, blubber and potatoes are also boiled together in stews, while slivers of the blubber are a popular accompaniment to dried fish. On special occasions, a dish called kalt borð, a spread of cold dishes and cakes often including dried pilot whale meat and salted blubber, can be served.

The traditional means of preserving meat and blubber is by salting or outdoor wind-drying – a process that takes around eight weeks. Salting is done by immersing the meat or blubber in brine that is sufficiently saline that a potato can float in it. The meat and blubber can last for a long time in this condition, but cannot be eaten directly. Instead, the salt water must be allowed to drain back out of the meat or blubber before consumption. Today, many people also freeze the meat and the blubber, but the traditional way of storage is still practiced, particularly in the villages.

== Dietary health risks ==
Studies in the late 1980s and 1990s exposed high levels of ocean-borne pollutants such as methyl mercury and PCB in the Faroese diet, and raised the alarm over the possible effects of the level of exposure on young children.

In August 2008, a WHO report summarising much of the prior research noted that the Faroe Islands population was exposed to methyl mercury largely from contaminated pilot whale meat, which contained very high levels of about 2 mg per kg. It noted that a 10-year study by Philippe Grandjean with a sample of about 900 Faroese children had shown that prenatal exposure to methyl mercury had resulted in neuropsychological deficits at 7 years of age, and that the developmental delays were significantly associated with methyl mercury exposures, even in lower exposure ranges.

In November 2008, Høgni Debes Joensen, the chief medical officer of the Faroe Islands, and scientist Pál Weihe recommended that pilot whales should no longer be considered healthy for human consumption due to the high levels of mercury, PCB and DDT derivatives in the animals. The research by Joensen and Weihe led to recommendations, but no ruling, by the Faroese government against the consumption of pilot whale meat.

In June 2011, the Faroese Food and Veterinary Authorities recommended that adults should only eat one portion of pilot whale meat and blubber per month, that the kidneys and liver of pilot whales should never be eaten, and that women should take particular care surrounding pregnancy.

In July 2012, Joensen and Weihe published a follow-up study showed that pilot whales contain an average of twice the EU limit for mercury in food. In the paper, Weihe also revealed the detrimental impact of ingested mercury from the regular consumption of pilot whales on the foetal development of the human nervous system. It also raised the risk of Parkinson's, hypertension, arteriosclerosis and negative impacts on reproductive function later in life.

In 2013, a survey revealed that students tended to consume more meat than blubber, and men more meat than women, probably due to warnings for pregnant women. The Faroese generally agree that these health considerations mean whale meat consumption may have to be reduced, and that pregnant mothers should avoid it.

== Competing interpretations ==
Faroese whaling practices have been challenged by environmental organisations, most notably by the Sea Shepherd Conservation Society, as being cruel and unnecessary, with critics pointing out that the suffering of the animals is not as limited as claimed. Reports on the length of time it takes the mammals to die are extremely variable, ranging from a few second to tens of minutes, and that is without touching on the psychological suffering that the animals endure as they are herded into the bays and killed in the presence of each other – a point emphasised by Sea Shepherd, which has also noted that the hunts can wipe out an entire whale pod or dolphin family group. Critics and legal experts also point to the violation of the Faroes Islands of the Convention on International Trade in Endangered Species of Wild Fauna and Flora (CITES) and Berne Convention on the Conservation of European Wildlife and Natural Habitats, which Denmark subscribes to. The State of Denmark has also pushed back on and refused to ratify the International Whaling Commission (IWC) moratorium on commercial whaling. Internationally, animal rights groups have targeted the hunts with protests, boycotts, and occasional direct interventions.

Proponents of Faroese pilot whaling defend it as essential to Faroese culture and argue that the number of whales taken are not harmful to the general pilot whale population. They also point to recent Faroese laws to make the whale hunts more humane and reduce the unnecessary suffering of the animals. One locally supported perspective, as illustrated by material published by the Faroese Department of Fisheries is that opposition to Faroese whaling is rooted in "the ambiguities it presents in relation to predominant cultural perceptions of nature and human society found in the urbanized Western world." This notion has been reiterated by other academics, such as in a 2008 paper in Australian Archaeology that said conservationists find Faroese whaling particularly offensive because it does not conform to traditional Western perspectives on "primitive" tribes. On a related note, the Dutch anthropologist Rob van Ginkel has argued that the Faroese whale hunt is unfairly singled out due to the "obviously important" symbolic dimension of whales "in human classifications of the pecking order of sea creatures". It has also been suggested that a reduction in the whale hunt could lead to an increase in other, less sustainable fishing practices by the Faroese. Proponents of whaling also argue that international whaling regulations have already scaled down the whale hunt from a profit maximisation model to a fairly limited form, and that, as with efficient fishery management, the whaling communities are economically incentivised to ensure that the whale hunt remains sustainable.

== Controversies ==
=== Anthony Hopkins film ===
In 1989, the Whale and Dolphin Conservation Society commissioned a one-minute-long animated public information film (or public service announcement) narrated by Anthony Hopkins, directed by Charlie Paul, and with music from Gary Bell, to raise awareness about the Faroe Islands' whaling of long-finned pilot whales. The film portrays the practice in a negative light, focusing on the suffering of the whales and the claimed sadism of the islanders.

=== Sea Shepherd campaigns ===
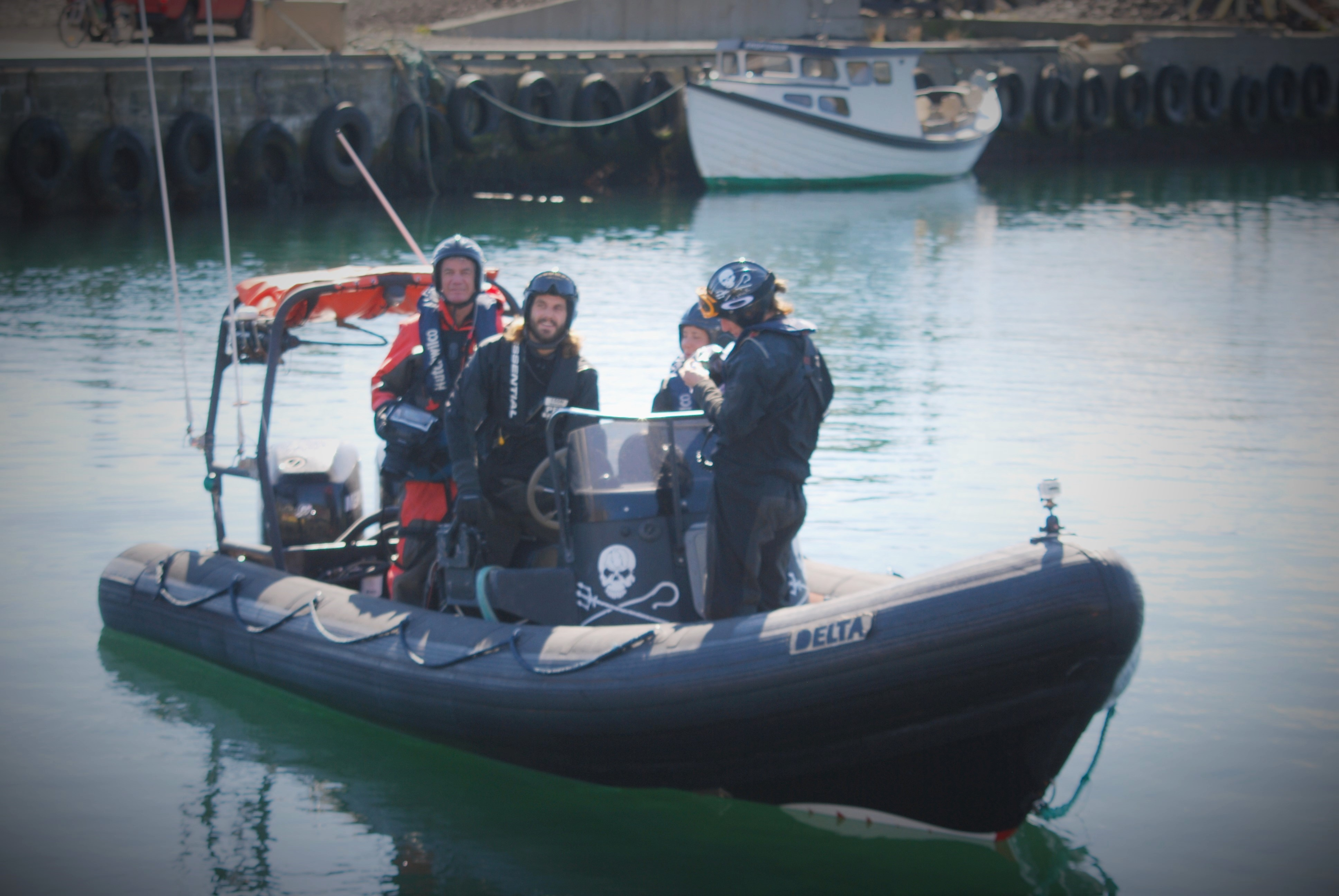
Sea Shepherd personnel in Porkeri harbour, Suðuroy in August 2011

Sea Shepherd has been involved in campaigning against the Faroese whale hunt since the 1980s, but stepped up its efforts in mid-June 2014 when it launched "Operation GrindStop", which saw hundreds of volunteers travelling to the Faroes Islands to patrol the waters and attempt to help protect the whales and dolphins.

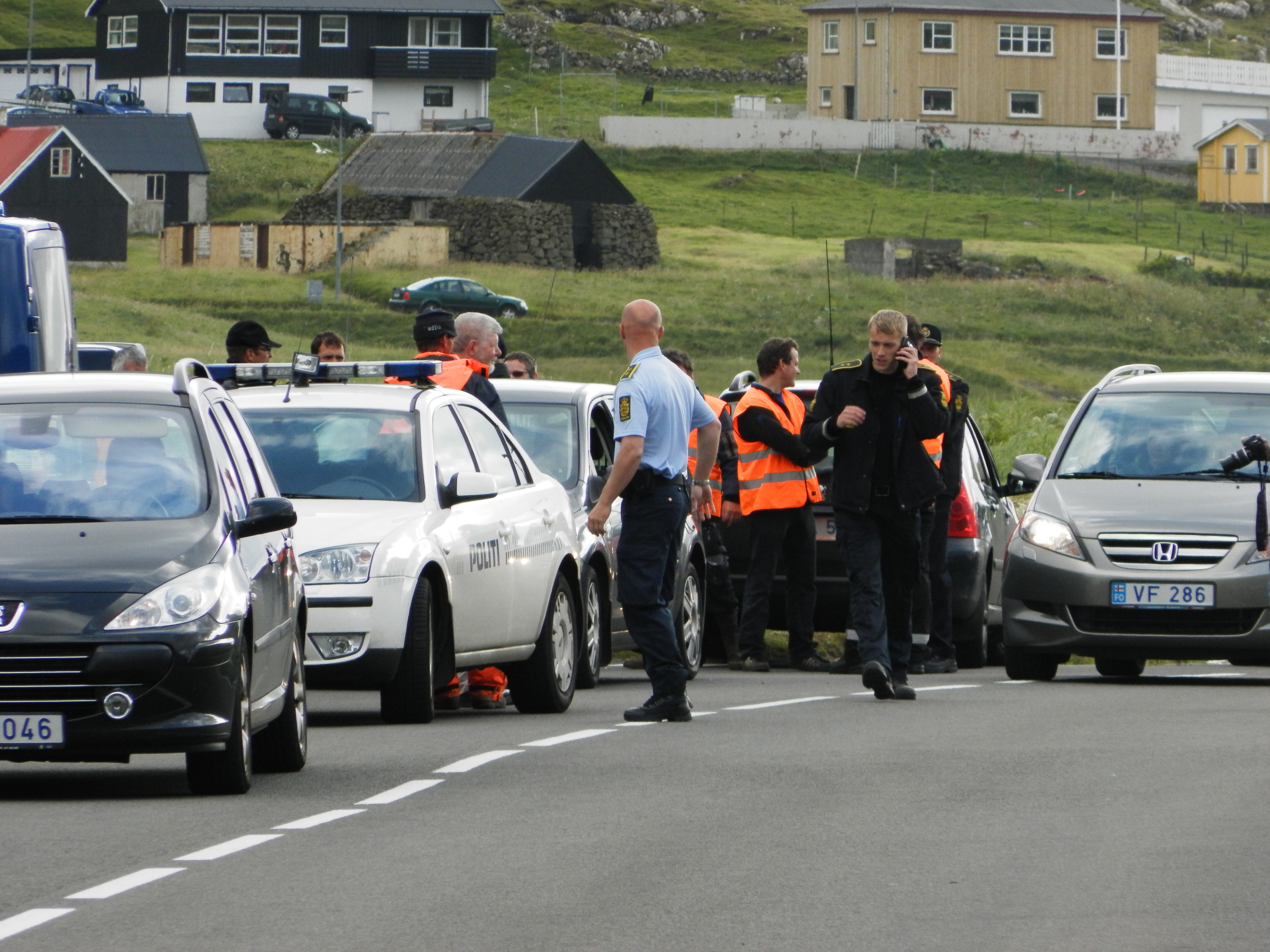
Police block access to Hvalba ahead of a hunt in August 2014

The subsequent year, Sea Shepherd led a further high-profile operation on the Faroe Islands called Sleppið Grindini, literally meaning "set the whales free" (a traditional order used by the whale hunt foreman to call off a whale hunt), that resulted in confrontations with local police and several arrests. The organisation's campaigning aimed to pressure the Danish Parliament into stopping the whale hunt, and it received some international media coverage.

The Faroese government had asked the Danish government to forbid Sea Shepherd from entering the Faroe Islands after their 2014 GrindStop campaign before the 2015 Sleppið Grindini started, but the Danish government had refused.

The confrontations led to trials both in the Faroese court and in Østre Landsret. The Faroese Court found five activists from Sea Shepherd guilty, issuing them fines from 5,000 DKK to 35,000 DKK, while Sea Shepherd Global was fined 75,000 DKK. The five activists in the case subsequently appealed in the higher Danish court, Østre Landsret, which lowered some of the sentences, though the 5,000 DKK fine was raised to 12,500 DKK.

In all, a total of 28 Sea Shepherd campaigners were arrested and four boats were confiscated between 2014 and 2015.

In 2017, Sea Shepherd followed up on its campaigns by made a legal complaint to the European Commission, delivering a dossier of what it claimed to be evidence showing Denmark had broken EU law by facilitating the slaughter of dolphins in the Faroe Islands. The case was initially dismissed by the commission, according to Sea Shepherd statements.

=== 2021 dolphin hunt ===
On 12 September 2021, Faroese whalers slaughtered 1,428 Atlantic white-sided dolphins after herding them into shallow waters at Skálabotnur beach in Eysturoy – a record-breaking mass killing event that drew criticism even from some members of the pro-whaling community, which typically hunts a fraction of that number in an entire year. The relevant hunt foreman was also not notified about and did not approve the hunt, as is required.

Subsequent reporting has suggested that "many errors" were made in driving so many dolphins into the bay and that the lack of whalers on hand prolonged the dolphins' suffering. Following the hunt a survey found that the majority of Faroese opposed hunting dolphins, but wanted whale hunts to continue. Animal rights campaigners have called on a boycott of Faroese-sourced seafood, and the suspension of the £580 million post-Brexit trade agreement. On 16 September, the Faroese Prime Minister Bárður á Steig Nielsen pledged an official review of the dolphin hunt amid the outcry and international media attention.

In July 2022, the Faroese government set a provisional dolphin hunt quota of 500 animals a year. Campaigners criticized the target as "farcical", as, since 1996, aside from the 2021 slaughter, there have been only three other years where more than 500 dolphins were killed: 2001, 2002 and 2006. The proposal of the government of a specific quota, noted Sally Hamilton of the marine conservation charity Orca, was to "formalise something that was previously unformalised", even though there is little market for dolphin meat and 53% of Faroese islands oppose dolphin hunting, as compared with 83% of islanders that support the killing of pilot whales.
