= Grindaknívur =

Faroese knife

Grindaknívur (Faroese: whaling knife), is along with the mønustingari (spinal cord cutter) the Faroese pilot whale hunt's most distinguished equipment. The haft and sheath are usually made of high-quality wood and have inlay of brass and silver.

There are no specific formal requirements to the whaling knife. In most cases the length of the blade is between 16 and 19 cm (6.3 and 7.5 in). The whaling knife is considered one of the foremost Faroese contributions to Nordic artistic craftsmanship. The knife was earlier used for the traditional method of killing pilot whales; to sever the spinal cord with a cut across the back of the neck of the animal between the head and the neck, but since 2011 a new invention called mønustingari (spinal cord cutter) has been legal to use for this purpose. The grindaknívur is now used after the whale has been killed with the mønustingari to cut the whale’s neck open, so that the blood can leave the whale's body.

== See also ==
- Grindadráp
