= Ann Aschengrau =

Epidemiologist

- Education: Northeastern University (BA); Harvard University (ScM, ScD)
- Scientific career
- Fields: Epidemiology
- Workplaces: Boston University School of Public Health
- Website: Official website

Ann Aschengrau is an epidemiologist who focuses on environmental and reproductive health. She is a professor of epidemiology at Boston University School of Public Health and is the Associate Chairman of the department.

== Career ==
Aschengrau is the lead investigator of a cohort study examining the impact of environmental and social stressors on substance use. She led the study of the effects of tetrachloroethylene (PCE) in Cape Cod, Massachusetts water pipes (from 1969 to 1983) which in 2014, found an increased likelihood of stillbirths and other pregnancy issues.

== Education ==
- Harvard University, ScD, epidemiology 1987
- Northeastern University, BA
- Harvard University, SM/ScM

== Publications ==
- Essentials of Epidemiology in Public Health textbook; coauthor George R. Seage III Harvard T.H. Chan School of Public Health
