= Philippe Grandjean (professor) =

Danish scientist

- Philippe Adam Grandjean
- Born: 1 March 1950 (age 76); Denmark
- Education: University of Copenhagen
- Known for: Research into the effects of toxic chemicals on the health of children
- Scientific career
- Fields: Environmental health
- Workplaces: University of Southern Denmark; Harvard School of Public Health
- Thesis: Widening perspectives of lead toxicity (1979)

Philippe Grandjean (born 1 March 1950) is a Danish scientist working in environmental medicine. He is the head of the Environmental Medicine Research Unit at the University of Southern Denmark and adjunct professor of environmental health at the Harvard School of Public Health. Grandjean is also co-founder and co-editor-in-chief of the journal Environmental Health, and consultant for the National Board of Health in Denmark. He is known for his research into the developmental toxicity and adverse effects of certain environmental chemicals to which children are commonly exposed.

== Life, education and career ==
Born in Denmark in 1950, his interest in environmental toxins began as a teenager watching birds and realizing that they were threatened by pesticides. Grandjean obtained his MD in environmental medicine from the University of Copenhagen in 1974 and his PhD in 1979. He began his career conducting field work into mercury poisoning and Minamata disease after seeing a woman with the disease on TV in 1972. This experience led him to spend his career researching neurotoxic substances. Since 1982, Grandjean has been a professor at the University of Southern Denmark and today he also heads their Environmental Medicine Research Unit. From 1994 to 2002 he was adjunct professor at Boston University and since 2003 he has been adjunct professor at Harvard School of Public Health. In 2002, he co-founded the journal Environmental Health and today he is the co-editor-in-chief, along with David Ozonoff of Boston University School of Public Health.

Grandjean has authored more than 500 scientific publications and his book Only One Chance: How Environmental Pollution Impairs Brain Development – and How to Protect the Brains of the Next Generation (Danish edition: Kemi på hjernen – går ud over enhver forstand) was published by Oxford University Press in 2013 (ISBN 978-0199985388).

He also features in webinars in the EU Commission Directorate General SANTE & Food.

== Research ==
Grandjean is known for conducting considerable research into the health effects of mercury in fish, and has spoken out for the maximum levels allowed by the EPA to be lowered by 50%.

Together with Philip Landrigan, Grandjean wrote about chemicals, including certain fluorinated compounds such as PFAS, certain heavy metals, DDT, PCB and toluene, found in the environment that they described as harmful to the neurodevelopment of children and fetuses. Landrigan and Grandjean proposed the implementation of a global prevention strategy to reduce children's exposure to such chemicals, and encouraged lawmakers not to assume that untested chemicals were "safe to brain development."
