= Margaret Stanley (ecologist) =

New Zealand ecologist

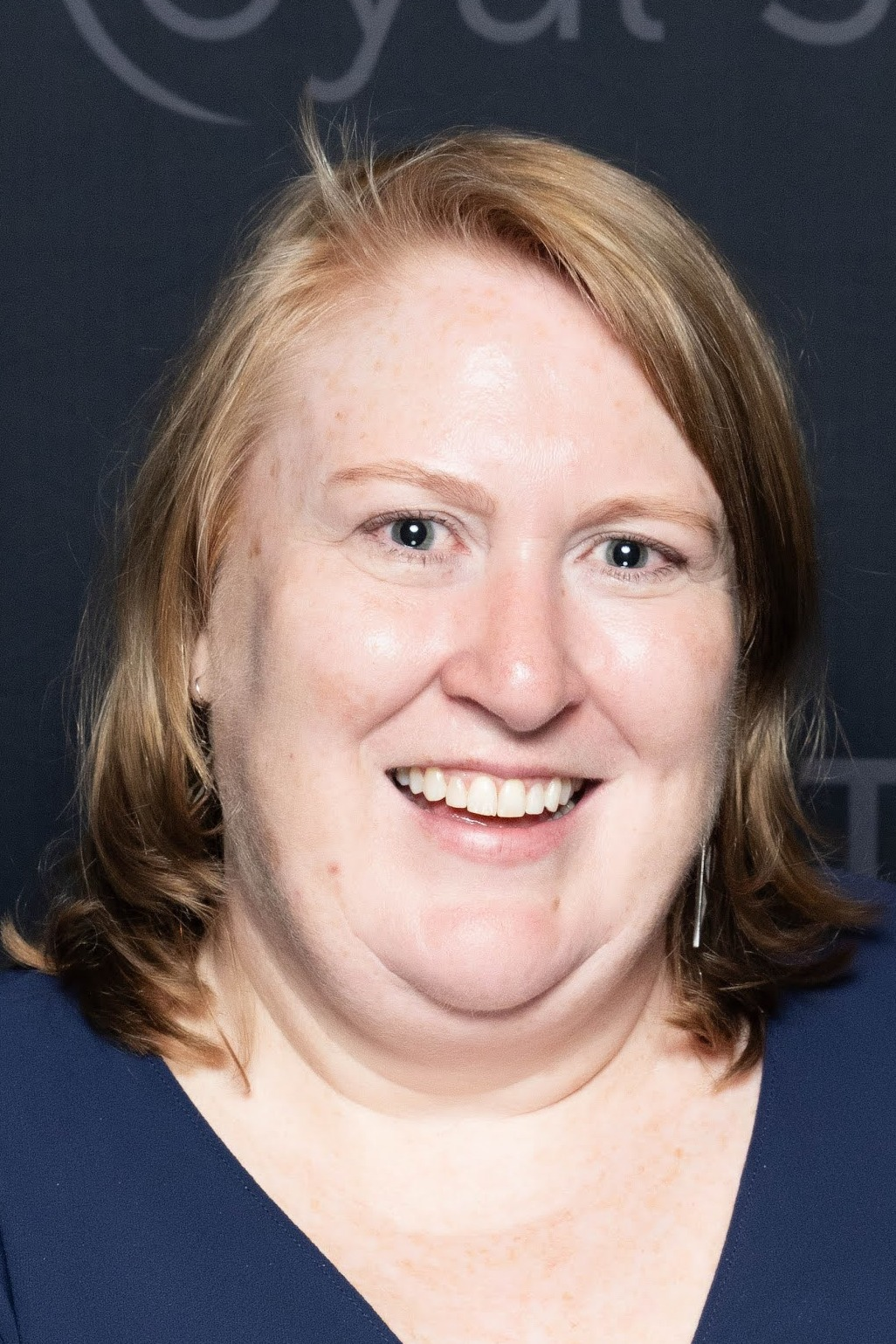
- Stanley in 2025
- Born: 1975 (age 50–51)
- Awards: Callaghan Medal (2025)

Academic background
- Education: Monash University
- Thesis: Factors influencing fruit choice and seed dispersal by the silvereye (Zosterops lateralis) (2001)

Academic work
- Discipline: Ecology
- Institutions: University of Auckland

Margaret Christine Stanley (born 1975) is a New Zealand ecologist, and is a full professor at the University of Auckland, specialising in understanding and mitigating human environmental impacts, including the impacts of urban intensification and of introduced pests and weeds.

== Academic career ==
Born in 1975, Stanley grew up in Dunedin, and studied zoology at the University of Otago, graduating with a Bachelor of Science degree with first-class honours in 1997. She completed a PhD titled Factors influencing fruit choice and seed dispersal by the silvereye (Zosterops lateralis) at Monash University. Stanley joined the faculty of the Centre for Biodiversity and Biosecurity in the School of Biological Sciences at the University of Auckland in 2007, rising to full professor in 2023.

Stanley is interested in understanding how humans impact on natural environments, and how those impacts can be reduced or mitigated. Stanley has written about the lack of long-term monitoring of New Zealand biodiversity, particularly insect populations, and on research that showed hundreds of pet birds escaped each year, leading to suggestions that pet parrot sales should be banned to protect native birds. Stanley has also talked about the importance of pest control of hedgehog and wallaby populations, and the need for nationwide cat control. Stanley also works on weeds, collaborating with cartoonist Pepper Raccoon to produce science communication aimed at improving public understanding of the need to weed control and prevention. She also advises on how people can increase the biodiversity in their backyard through planting, and how better planting in private and public places can create 'sponge cities' to avoid flooding.

In 2025, Stanley was awarded the Callaghan Medal of the Royal Society Te Apārangi.

== Selected works ==
- Galbraith, Josie; Beggs, Jacqueline Rae; Darryl N Jones; Stanley, Margaret (2015). "Supplementary feeding restructures urban bird communities". Proceedings of the National Academy of Sciences of the United States of America. 112 (20): E2648-57. Bibcode:2015PNAS..112E2648G. doi:10.1073/pnas.1501489112. PMC 4443315. PMID 25941361. Wikidata Q35622191.
- Williams, Peter A.; Wiser, Susan; Clarkson, Bev; Stanley, Margaret C. (2007). "New Zealand's historically rare terrestrial ecosystems set in a physical and physiognomic framework". New Zealand Journal of Ecology. 31 (2): 119–128. ISSN 0110-6465. JSTOR 24058138.
- Galbraith, Josie; Beggs, Jacqueline Rae; Darryl N. Jones; Ellery J. McNaughton; Cheryl R. Krull; Stanley, Margaret (2014). "Risks and drivers of wild bird feeding in urban areas of New Zealand". Biological Conservation. 180: 64–74. doi:10.1016/j.biocon.2014.09.038. Wikidata Q59599803.
- A R Zangerl; Stanley, Margaret; Berenbaum, May Roberta (2008). "Selection for chemical trait remixing in an invasive weed after reassociation with a coevolved specialist". Proceedings of the National Academy of Sciences of the United States of America. 105 (12): 4547–4552. Bibcode:2008PNAS..105.4547Z. doi:10.1073/pnas.0710280105. PMC 2290761. PMID 18238901. Wikidata Q36534327.
- Galbraith, Josie; Darryl N. Jones; Beggs, Jacqueline Rae; Katharina Parry; Stanley, Margaret (2017). "Urban Bird Feeders Dominated by a Few Species and Individuals". Frontiers in Ecology and Evolution. 5. doi:10.3389/fevo.2017.00081. Wikidata Q111158955.
- Ward, Darren; Harris, RJ; Stanley, Margaret (January 2005). "Human-mediated range expansion of Argentine ants Linepithema humile (Hymenoptera: Formicidae) in New Zealand". Sociobiology. 45 (2): 401–407.
- Sheppard, Christine; Burns, Bruce; Stanley, Margaret (2014). "Predicting plant invasions under climate change: are species distribution models validated by field trials?". Global Change Biology. 20 (9): 2800–2814. doi:10.1111/gcb.12531. PMID 24446429. Wikidata Q30738690.
