= Jacqueline Beggs =

New Zealand entomologist and ecologist

Jacqueline Rae Beggs (born 1962) is a New Zealand entomologist and ecologist specialising in biodiversity and biosecurity.

Beggs is a professor at the University of Auckland. Her research includes managing the impact of invasive invertebrates on the biosystem. She has also researched the identification of drivers of pollination and evaluated the use of the molecular approach (DNA barcoding) to identify possible causes of detrimental changes in the environment. Beggs is associated with organisations focused on raising awareness of a wide range of issues relevant to biosecurity and advises New Zealand government agencies.

Beggs has also written on the value of recognising the importance of mātauranga Māori (Māori knowledge) in ecological research.

== Biography ==
Beggs was born in Palmerston North and educated at Waiouru Primary School, Linden Primary School, Tawa College and Rangitoto College. She is of English, Scottish, Irish and Ngāti Awa ancestry.

Following an undergraduate and master's degree at the University of Auckland, Beggs completed a PhD part-time at the University of Otago in 1999.

From 1992 to 2003 Beggs was employed by Landcare Research in Nelson, and since then has been a professor based at the School of Biological Sciences at the University of Auckland. She is currently the academic leader of the Ecology, Evolution and Behaviour group, and director of the Centre for Biodiversity and Biosecurity, a joint research centre between Landcare Research and the University of Auckland.

== Research ==
=== Ecological impact of invasive species ===
Research by Beggs has largely focussed on the impact of invasive species of wasps on the New Zealand ecosystem, particularly around the beech (Nothofagus spp.) forests in New Zealand's upper South Island, where scale insects (Ultracoelostoma assimile) produce honeydew that both native birds and invasive Vespula wasps feed on.

In an interview on 95bFM, Beggs explained that invasive wasps became a problem in New Zealand because there were no native predators, the climate was suitable and good quantities of sugary food, such as honeydew produced by native species on beech trees, were available. She noted that the impact of the wasps on the ecosystem was on many levels, including feeding on native invertebrates such as spiders and caterpillars, robbing native birds of food and attacking nestling birds. This confirmed previous research in which Beggs had been involved, which explored the impact of wasps on invertebrate abundance and the reduction of food that would otherwise be eaten by the South Island robin (Petroica australis australis), and, along with stoats, in a decline of South Island kākā.

In 2011, Beggs co-authored a review that assessed the "distribution, abundance, impact and management of the invasive Vespidae worldwide", noting that the problem had become greater due to increased global trade. The review highlighted the challenges of preventing invasions "[because] the very characteristics that help to make them invasive, i.e. the social structure of colonies and their high reproductive efficiency, also means management at the population level will be difficult." When the Environmental Protection Society gave approval for two foreign organisms to be imported into New Zealand in February 2021 to help combat the problem of invasive wasp species, Beggs said that these introduced species would result in a significant reduction in numbers with relatively small risks to the ecosystem. She told Kathryn Ryan on RNZ in 2019 that there had been some progress made in reducing the number of invasive wasps in New Zealand by the effective use of poison baiting. She explained that other management alternatives were being explored in the National Science Challenge, and from work on offshore islands that had indicated wasp density reduced in an area with less human modification of the environment and a higher amount of tree cover.

A 2021 study co-authored by Beggs mapped and collected 64 active wasp nests from the Great Mercury Island (Ahuahu) extracting DNA from faecal material to identify what the wasps were preying on. Using DNA bar-coding, samples were compared to the Barcode of Life Database (BOLD) to match the codes to species in New Zealand. The wasps were found to be preying on many native animals having an ecological impact on the island. Beggs said: "This study has real implications for our understanding of how invasive species interact as well as for invasive wasp control in New Zealand...[and]...by understanding their combined ecological impact, at least we have a better chance of developing strategies to better protect our valuable native species."

=== Pollination ===
In 2016, Beggs took part in research looking at animal-mediated pollination, in particular how the hairiness of the pollinator can predict the effectiveness of the process. The report, co-authored by Beggs, suggested that "the match between pollinator body region hairiness and plant reproductive structure morphology is a powerful predictor of pollinator effectiveness...[which is important because]...identifying and accurately measuring key traits that drive ecosystem processes is critical as global change increasingly alters ecological communities, and subsequently, ecosystem functions worldwide." Later research in which she participated investigated the degree to which changes of natural habitats to agricultural land can contribute to a decline in effective pollination rates. The report noted that while pollination rates increased as there was more conversion to agricultural land, "pollination service delivery became increasingly dominated by a few exotic fly species that were active throughout the day, compared to native species, which had more constrained activity patterns." It was suggested that it was important to restore and manage diverse natural habitats but that in cases where pollination has been disturbed by human intervention, exotic pollinators can be effective, and careful decisions need to be made about the use of pesticides to maintain pollinator communities whether they are native or exotic.

=== Use of a molecular approach to research ===
Beggs has been involved in research that showed the effectiveness of DNA metabarcoding of larval faeces to gather data on the interactions between different invasive species and what they fed on. One study, using this methodology obtained high-resolution diet inventories that showed invasion by wasps had a considerable effect on the ecology, with evidence that they ate native and endemic invertebrates. It concluded that information gathered in this way was valuable in assessing the "cumulative effects of multiple invaders on the recipient community." Earlier research had shown how the use of high-throughput DNA sequencing to analyse stomach content of faeces of Hymenoptera, was able to provide evidence that Polistes wasps fed on agricultural pests. The study concluded that this methodology is "readily applicable to other nest-building Hymenoptera and has the potential to provide comprehensive knowledge about their diet with minimum sampling effort...[and]...such knowledge is essential to measure the ecological impact of invasive Vespidae and support the conservation of native invertebrate biodiversity."

=== Acknowledging mātauranga Māori in ecological research ===
In 2005, the Ministry of Research, Science and Technology (New Zealand) released Vision Mātauranga, a policy paper to "provide strategic direction for research of relevance to Māori...with a mission to 'unlock the innovation potential of Mäori knowledge, resources and people to assist New Zealanders to create a better future'." Beggs was one academic who challenged the premise in the document that Performance Based Research Funding (PBRF) would provide good returns for Māori and in a paper she co-authored, identified problems resulting from this that "[would create] significant barriers to increasing the volume, scope and quality of environmental research for Māori." In 2019, Beggs collaborated with two other academics to review the level of leadership and diversity in the New Zealand Ecology Society through tracking how often the society's journal publications used terms such as 'Māori', 'culture' and 'mātauranga' to track the incorporation of indigenous views and mātauranga Māori into New Zealand ecological research. The conclusion was that at the time there were very few articles published by the organisation that reflected these aspects of research into biodiversity.The subsequent volume of this Journal became a 'Mātauranga Māori special issue' with articles that acknowledged the importance of mātauranga Māori and kaupapa Māori in ecological research.

For this edition, Beggs contributed to editorials that stressed the importance of the inclusion of mātauranga Māori in New Zealand ecological research while noting that there needed to be institutional and systemic support for scientific researchers to change practices and recognise the contribution it could make. She co-authored a further study for the issue that used narratives to explore how kaitiakitanga, as an example of managing the natural environment, could inform urban restoration projects by recognising and harnessing indigenous knowledge and values into New Zealand research policy.

== Public policy positions ==
- In 2020, Beggs signed an open letter to the University of Waikato Council, "in support of Māori academics who have spoken out about long-term, unresolved systemic and casual racism they have experienced at the University of Waikato...[and]...call on the University of Waikato to establish fair, transparent policies for staff to safely lodge complaints about racism and for these complaints to be dealt with in line with Kaupapa Māori values and principles of fairness."
- Writing for Newsroom in 2020, Beggs urged more than just issuing warnings about the dangers of climate change and noted the need for action on managing "the accelerating loss of biodiversity, the intensification of agricultural impacts, the overexploitation of resources, rampant urban development, the pollution of our land and waterways, and the continuous arrival and impact of pests and disease. Many of these issues interact, requiring solutions that are multi-pronged and take a holistic approach."
- Beggs joined other academics, researchers and teachers in 2019 to sign a document that supported the young people of Aotearoa New Zealand and around the world who were striking for more immediate and decisive action on climate change.
- In February 2019, Beggs acknowledged the efficiency of New Zealand's biosecurity system in managing the fruit fly detection, concluding: "So hats off to all the folk involved in keeping fruit fly at bay. That includes you – let biosecurity officers onto your property to check for infestation, make sure you do not move fruit or veges from 'controlled areas', and encourage everyone to never bring undeclared produce into New Zealand."
- In the NZ Herald (2013), Beggs warned that New Zealand needed to proceed carefully with the introduction of dung beetles to control pests, considering not just the risk to humans, but also the possible impact on the country's ecosystems.

== Awards ==
In 2015, Beggs was awarded the Te Tohu Taiao award for ecological excellence from the New Zealand Ecological Society.

== Associations ==
- Since 2013, Beggs has been a member of the Biosecurity Ministerial Advisory Committee, which provides independent advice to the Minister for Biosecurity on the biosecurity system.
- In 2015, the Endangered Species Foundation confirmed Beggs as a new board member of the organisation, noting in their introductory newsletter: "The main purpose of Jacqueline's research is to contribute to the understanding of the ecological consequences of invasive species and ultimately to assist in conserving the native biodiversity of New Zealand."
- Beggs is an Associate Editor of the New Zealand Entomologist Journal.
- In 2021, Beggs became chair of the kākāpō Recovery Group.
- Beggs blogs about her interest in sailing.

== Selected works ==
- Urban Bird Feeders Dominated by a Few Species and Individuals (2017): A report, co-authored by Beggs, on research conducted to explore the possible detrimental effects of domestic feeding of birds.
- Dung beetles in an avian-dominated island ecosystem: feeding and trophic ecology (2014): This report on researching the impact of dung beetles on the New Zealand ecosystem was co-authored by Beggs.
- Sensory-based conservation of seabirds: a review of management strategies and animal behaviours that facilitate success (2016): This research "review(s) the use of auditory, olfactory, and visual methods, especially for attracting seabirds to newly restored habitat or deterring birds from fishing boats and equipment."
- Establishment of the wasp parasitoid, Sphecophaga vesparum (Hymenoptera: Ichneumonidae), in New Zealand (1991): Early research in which Beggs participated that investigated the introduction of the parasitoid Ichneumonidae into New Zealand and gathered to data to assess how well it was established and whether it would reduce wasp numbers. Further reference:
