= Environmental Health (journal) =

- Discipline: Environmental health, occupational medicine
- Language: English
- Edited by: Philippe Grandjean, David Ozonoff

Publication details
- History: 2002-present
- Publisher: BioMed Central
- Open access: Yes
- License: Creative Commons Attribution 4.0
- Impact factor: 4.690 (2019)

Standard abbreviations
- ISO 4: Environ. Health

Indexing
- CODEN: EHAGAB
- ISSN: 1476-069X
- OCLC no.: 50687032

Links
- Journal homepage; Online archive

Environmental Health is a peer-reviewed medical journal established in 2002 and published by BioMed Central. It covers research in all areas of environmental and occupational medicine. The editors-in-chief are Philippe Grandjean (University of Southern Denmark) and Ruth Etzel (Milken Institute School of Public Health at George Washington University). The journal had a 2022 5-year impact factor of 7.0.
