= How Far to Asgaard =

Studio album by Týr
- Released: 1 January 2002
- Genres: Folk metal; progressive metal; Viking metal; doom metal
- Length: 53:22
- Label: TUTL
- Producer: Týr

Týr chronology
How Far to Asgaard (2002)	Eric the Red (2003)

2008 re-release

How Far to Asgaard is the debut studio album by Faroese folk metal band Týr. It was released in January 2002 by TUTL Records.

"Ormurin Langi" is a metal version of the traditional Faroese song. A video for the song was also recorded in Iceland.

The song "How Far to Asgaard" is 8:59 in length, followed by 9:50 of silence. At 18:49 there is the Faroese poem "Nornagest Ríma" chanted by a group and accompanied by rhythmic stamping.

The Russian release of the album is issued by СД-Максимум (CD-Maximum) under license from Tutl Records. The 9:50 of silence on the track "How Far to Asgaard" is shortened to just 0:51. This version also contains the video for "Hail to the Hammer". The album art on this version is an obvious remake of the original.

The album was re-released on 2 October 2008 by Napalm Records with a new cover artwork and two additional tracks originally from the single "Ólavur Riddararós" released in 2002. In the re-released version, the poem "Nornagest Ríma" is used as a bonus track after the song "Stýrisvølurin", instead of "How Far to Asgaard". "Stýrisvølurin" ends at 6:42 and is followed by 2:52 of silence, until "Nornagest Ríma" starts at 9:34.

== Track listing ==
Music by Týr except where noted. Lyrics by Heri Joensen except where noted.

No.	Title	Lyrics	Music	Length
1.	"Hail to the Hammer"	Heri Joensen	Heri Joensen, Pól Arni Holm	4:34
2.	"Excavation"	H. Joensen	H. Joensen, Gunnar H. Thomsen	6:42
3.	"The Rune"	H. Joensen	H. Joensen, Holm, Thomsen	6:42
4.	"Ten Wild Dogs"	H. Joensen	H. Joensen, Jón Joensen, Thomsen	6:51
5.	"God of War"	H. Joensen	H. Joensen, J. Joensen	7:08
6.	"Sand in the Wind"	H. Joensen	H. Joensen	6:24
7.	"Ormurin Langi"	Jens Christian Djurhuus	Traditional	5:50
8.	"How Far to Asgaard"	H. Joensen	H. Joensen, Kári Streymoy, Holm	29:27
Total length:				53:22

2008 re-release bonus tracks
No.	Title	Lyrics	Music	Length
9.	"Ólavur Riddararós"	Traditional	Traditional	4:36
10.	"Stýrisvølurin"	Traditional, H. Joensen	H. Joensen	20:14
Total length:				78:11

On the final track, "Stýrisvølurin" runs for 6:42, followed by 2:52 of silence, then the hidden poem “Nornagest Ríma”.

== Personnel ==
Týr

- Pól Arni Holm – vocals
- Heri Joensen – guitars, backing vocals
- Gunnar H. Thomsen – bass, backing vocals
- Kári Streymoy – drums, percussion, backing vocals
- Allan Streymoy – lead vocals on tracks 9–10

Production

- Mastered by Lenhert Kjeldsen
- Mixed by Lasse Glavind and Jesper Johansen
