= Eric the Red (album) =

Studio album by Týr
- Released: 27 June 2003
- Studio: Jacob Hansen studio, Denmark
- Genre: Folk metal; progressive metal; Viking metal
- Length: 60:14
- Label: TUTL
- Producer: Týr

Týr chronology
How Far to Asgaard (2002)	Eric the Red (2003)	Ragnarok (2006)

2006 re-release

Professional ratings
Review scores
Source	Rating
About.com	4/5 stars
AllMusic	4.5/5 stars
Lords of Metal	(8.1/10)
Metal Storm	9/10 stars

Eric the Red is the second studio album by Faroese folk metal band Týr. It was released on 27 June 2003 by TUTL Records.

The album is trilingual with Faroese and English as the predominant languages. The song "Ramund Hin Unge" is sung in Danish (specifically Gøtudanskt).

The album was re-released on 24 March 2006 by Napalm Records with a new cover artwork and two additional tracks originally from a demo released in 2000.

The original cover features a painting by Haukur L. Halldórsson titled The Ocean God. The re-release album features cover art by Jan Yrlund.

== Track listing ==
No.	Title	Lyrics	Music	Length
1.	"The Edge"	Heri Joensen	Heri Joensen	7:44
2.	"Regin Smiður"	Traditional	Traditional	6:08
3.	"Dreams"	H. Joensen	H. Joensen	5:32
4.	"The Wild Rover" (Irish traditional song)	Traditional	Traditional	4:12
5.	"Stýrisvølurin"	H. Joensen	H. Joensen, traditional	6:57
6.	"Ólavur Riddararós"	Traditional	Traditional	4:36
7.	"Rainbow Warrior"	H. Joensen	H. Joensen	5:28
8.	"Ramund Hin Unge"	Traditional	Traditional	4:31
9.	"Alive"	H. Joensen	H. Joensen	7:24
10.	"Eric the Red"	H. Joensen	H. Joensen	7:42
Total length:				60:14

2006 re-release bonus tracks
No.	Title	Lyrics	Music	Length
11.	"God of War" (re-issue from 2000 demo)	H. Joensen	H. Joensen	6:23
12.	"Hail to the Hammer" (re-issue from 2000 demo)	H. Joensen	H. Joensen	3:49
Total length:				70:25

== Personnel ==
- Heri Joensen – vocals, guitar
- Terji Skibenæs – guitar
- Gunnar H. Thomsen – bass
- Kári Streymoy – drums
