= Anker Eli Petersen =

Faroese writer and artist

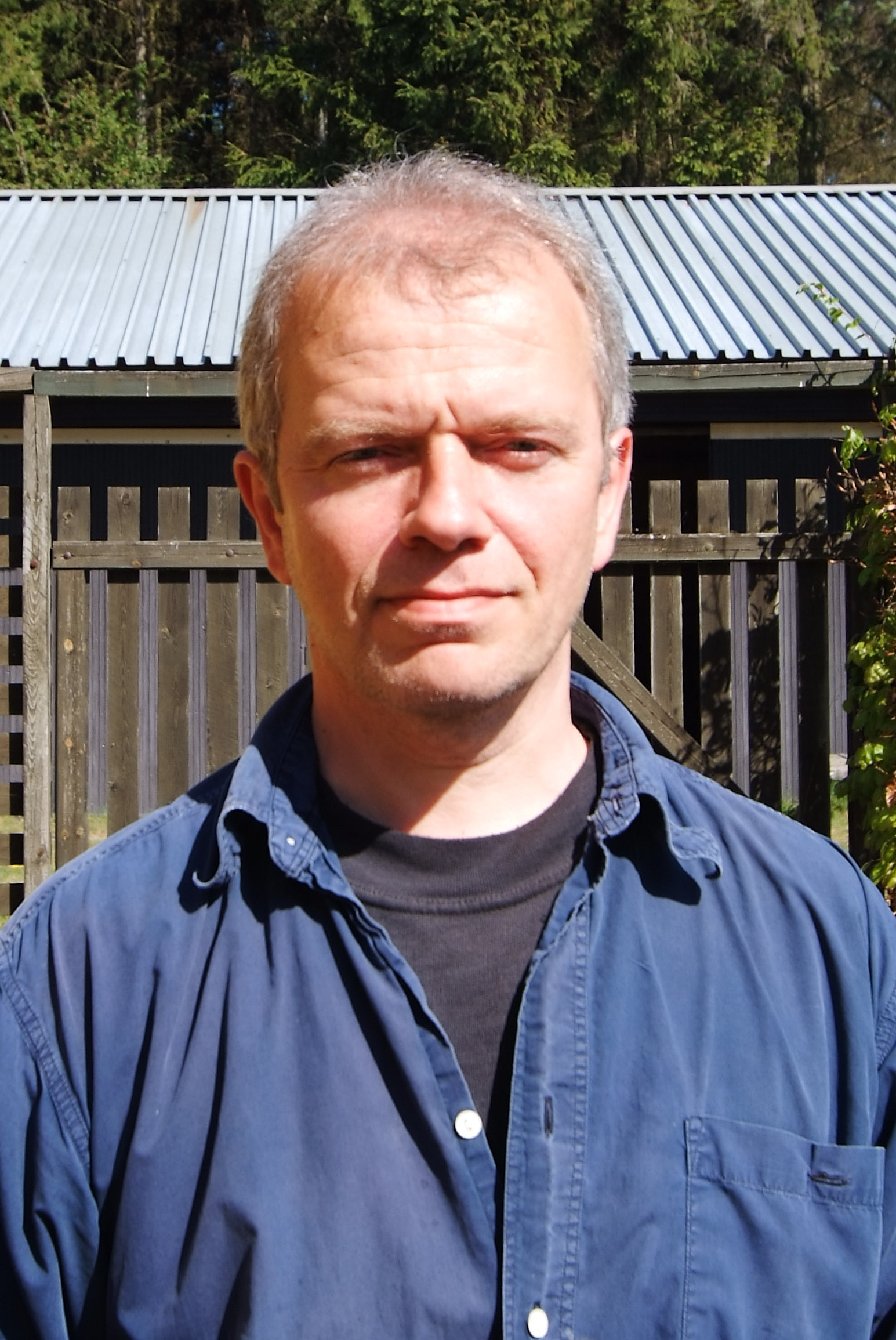
Anker Eli Petersen

Anker Eli Petersen (born 7 June 1959 in Tvøroyri) is a Faroese graphic artist, illustrator, poet and writer. He grew up in Tórshavn, and now resides on Sjælland (Zealand), Denmark.

A self-taught artist, his expertise is in papercut collages (litklipp (Note: litklipp (litur"color", pappírklipp "paper cutting") is a term appearing in the title of a Heinesen art collection book.)) and computer graphics illustrations. He also goes by his first name "Anker Eli", (Note: "Anker Eli er búsitandi í Danmark") (Note: "the designer Anker Eli (*1959)") just as he signs his work on stamps "anker eli" in lowercase.

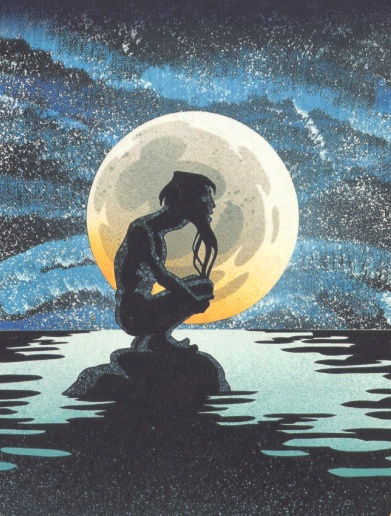
Sævarmaður ("Merman", 1998). — 55x60cm, at the Faroese Teachers School

Petersen's artwork shows the influence of the great writer William Heinesen, who was also renowned as painter, illustrator, and papercutting artist, particularly the 1955 mural-work at a public school commissioned to Heinesen, depicting Sjúrður (Sigurðr, Siegfried) the dragonslayer as sung in the Sjúrðar kvæði Faroese ballad cycle.

Alongside these two, Elinborg Lützen can also be named as a major figure in the illustration of Faroese folklore. Lützen's technique using bold, non-intricately shaped lino prints is echoed by Heinesen and Petersen who both worked with collages of simplified shapes, together establishing a distinctive trademark style of Faroese art.

He has illustrated a number of stamp sheets for the Postverk Føroya, notably on Norse mythology themes, such as the Sjúrður cycle (e.g., Brynhild and Budli, 1998 and Regin Smiður, 2012) as well as Völuspá from the Edda in 2003, as well as Thórr and Rán in 2004, and the Norns in 2006. He also designed several stamps on religious themes, "Mythical Places" (2008, photographic) on stone formations associated with huldúfolk, 2001 Christmas stamp "Scream from Ramah" depicting the sorrow of the Massacre of the Innocents, and 2005 Christmas carol issue including the Rudisar vísa, a rendition of the Saint Stephen and Herod ballad featuring the theme of the resurrecting rooster.

He has also illustrated many books.

He has also written lyrics for songs in album releases, collaborating with Terji Rasmussen providing the music, for Rasmussen's band Terji og Føstufressar's debut album (1990), also called Terji og Føstufressar after the band's own name. It received "The Album of the Millennium" accolade from the Faroese press. Anker Eli also wrote the English translation to the ballad Regin Smiður in the liner notes for the heavy metal band Týr's album Eric the Red (2003), which included a hard rock rendition of the ballad. He has written children's carols as well.
