= By the Light of the Northern Star =

Studio album by Týr
- Released: 29 May 2009
- Recorded: Early 2009
- Studio: Kris-Stuff Studio
- Genre: Folk metal; progressive metal; Viking metal
- Length: 43:17
- Label: Napalm
- Producer: Heri Joensen; Kári Streymoy

Týr chronology
Land (2008)	By the Light of the Northern Star (2009)	The Lay of Thrym (2011)

Professional ratings
Review scores
Source	Rating
About.com	4/5 stars
AllMusic	3/5 stars
Blabbermouth.net	8.5/10

By the Light of the Northern Star is the fifth studio album by Faroese folk metal band Týr. It was released on 29 May 2009 through Napalm Records. The cover artwork is by Gyula Havancsák.

== Track listing ==
No.	Title	Lyrics	Music	Length
1.	"Hold the Heathen Hammer High"	Heri Joensen	Heri Joensen	4:50
2.	"Tróndur í Gøtu"	Faroese traditional, Joensen	Faroese traditional	4:01
3.	"Into the Storm"	Joensen	Faroese & Norwegian traditional, Joensen	5:04
4.	"Northern Gate"	Joensen	Joensen	4:42
5.	"Turið Torkilsdóttir"	Faroese traditional	Faroese traditional	4:18
6.	"By the Sword in My Hand"	Joensen	Swedish & Finnish traditional	4:48
7.	"Ride"	Joensen	Faroese & Irish traditional, Joensen	4:59
8.	"Hear the Heathen Call"	Joensen	Faroese traditional, Joensen	4:40
9.	"By the Light of the Northern Star"	Joensen	Faroese & Norwegian traditional, Joensen	5:55
Total length:				43:17

Limited edition only
No.	Title	Music	Length
10.	"The Northern Lights"	Norwegian traditional, Joensen	1:48
11.	"Anthem"	Petur Alberg	1:36
Total length:			46:41

== Personnel ==
- Heri Joensen – vocals, guitars, production
- Terji Skibenæs – guitars
- Gunnar Thomsen – bass
- Kári Streymoy – drums, production
- Jacob Hansen – mixing
- Mika Jussila – mastering
- Gyula Havancsák – artwork
