= Reistrup =

Reistrup is a surname. Notable people with the surname include:

- Høgni Reistrup (born 1984), Faroese singer, musician, writer, and scientist
- Karl Hansen Reistrup (1863–1929), Danish sculptor, illustrator, and ceramist
