= Valkyrja (album) =

Studio album by Týr
- Released: 16 September 2013
- Genre: Power metal; folk metal; Viking metal
- Length: 45:44
- Label: Metal Blade
- Producer: Jacob Hansen

Týr chronology
The Lay of Thrym (2011)	Valkyrja (2013)	Hel (2019)

Professional ratings
Review scores
Source	Rating
About.com	4/5 stars
Exclaim!	(7/10)
Revolver	4/5
PopMatters	8/10 stars
Metal Hammer Norway	8/10 stars

Valkyrja is the seventh studio album by Faroese folk metal band Týr. It was announced on 22 July 2013 and released on 16 September 2013 through Metal Blade Records.

== Track listing ==
No.	Title	Lyrics	Music	Length
1.	"Blood of Heroes"	Heri Joensen	Terji Skibenæs & Heri Joensen	3:41
2.	"Mare of My Night"	Heri Joensen	Heri Joensen	3:55
3.	"Hel Hath No Fury"	Heri Joensen	Heri Joensen	3:26
4.	"The Lay of Our Love" (featuring Liv Kristine)	Heri Joensen	Faeroese/Danish trad., Heri Joensen	3:47
5.	"Nation"	Steingrimur Baldvinsson, Heri Joensen	Icelandic trad., Heri Joensen	4:04
6.	"Another Fallen Brother"	Heri Joensen	Terji Skibenæs	4:04
7.	"Grindavísan"	Christian Pløyen, Heri Joensen	Faeroese/Danish trad., Heri Joensen	4:10
8.	"Into the Sky"	Heri Joensen	Faeroese trad., Heri Joensen	2:56
9.	"Fánar Burtur Brandaljóð"	Heri Joensen	Norwegian trad., Heri Joensen	3:38
10.	"Lady of the Slain"	Heri Joensen	Terji Skibenæs	4:32
11.	"Valkyrja"	Heri Joensen	Gunnar Thomsen & Heri Joensen	7:31
Total length:				45:44

Bonus tracks
No.	Title	Length
12.	"Where Eagles Dare" (Iron Maiden cover)	6:26
13.	"Cemetery Gates" (Pantera cover)	7:25
Total length:		59:35

== Personnel ==
- Heri Joensen – guitars, vocals
- Terji Skibenæs – guitars
- Gunnar H. Thomsen – bass
- George Kollias – drums
- Liv Kristine – guest vocals
