= Land (Týr album) =

Studio album by Týr
- Released: 30 May 2008
- Genre: Folk metal; progressive metal; Viking metal
- Length: 68:22
- Label: Napalm
- Producer: Týr

Týr chronology
Ragnarok (2006)	Land (2008)	By the Light of the Northern Star (2009)

Professional ratings
Review scores
Source	Rating
About.com	4/5 stars
AllMusic	4/5 stars
Blabbermouth.net	6.5/10
Lords of Metal	8/10 stars

Land is the fourth studio album by Faroese folk metal band Týr. It is a multilingual album with vocals in Faroese, English, Norwegian, Dano-Norwegian in Sinklars Vísa and Icelandic in Brennivín. It was released on 30 May 2008 through Napalm Records. The album is based on Nordic folklore. The final track is a new version of the song "Hail to the Hammer" which originally appeared on a demo in 2000, and again on How Far to Asgaard in 2002.

== Track listing ==
Land track listing
No.	Title	Lyrics	Music	Length
1.	"Gandkvæði Tróndar"	J.H.O. Djurhuus (1881–1948)	Traditional Faeroese, arr. Heri Joensen	4:10
2.	"Sinklars Vísa"	Edvard Storm	Traditional Norwegian, Heri Joensen	4:55
3.	"Ocean"	Heri Joensen	Heri Joensen, Traditional Faeroese	10:07
4.	"Gátu Ríma"	Traditional Faeroese	Traditional Faeroese, Heri Joensen	5:38
5.	"Brennivín"	Heri Joensen, Björn S. Blöndal (1893–1980)	Heri Joensen, Traditional Icelandic	4:58
6.	"Fípan Fagra"	Traditional Faeroese	Traditional Faeroese, Heri Joensen	5:49
7.	"Valkyrjan"	Heri Joensen	Heri Joensen, Traditional Faeroese, Edvard Grieg, Traditional Norwegian	5:05
8.	"Lokka Táttur"	Traditional Faeroese	Traditional Faeroese, Swedish, Heri Joensen	6:02
9.	"Land"	Heri Joensen, J.H.O. Djurhuus, Hávamál	Heri Joensen, Traditional Faeroese	16:19
10.	"Hail to the Hammer"	Heri Joensen	Heri Joensen, Traditional Faeroese	5:19
Total length:				68:22
