= Tourism in the Faroe Islands =

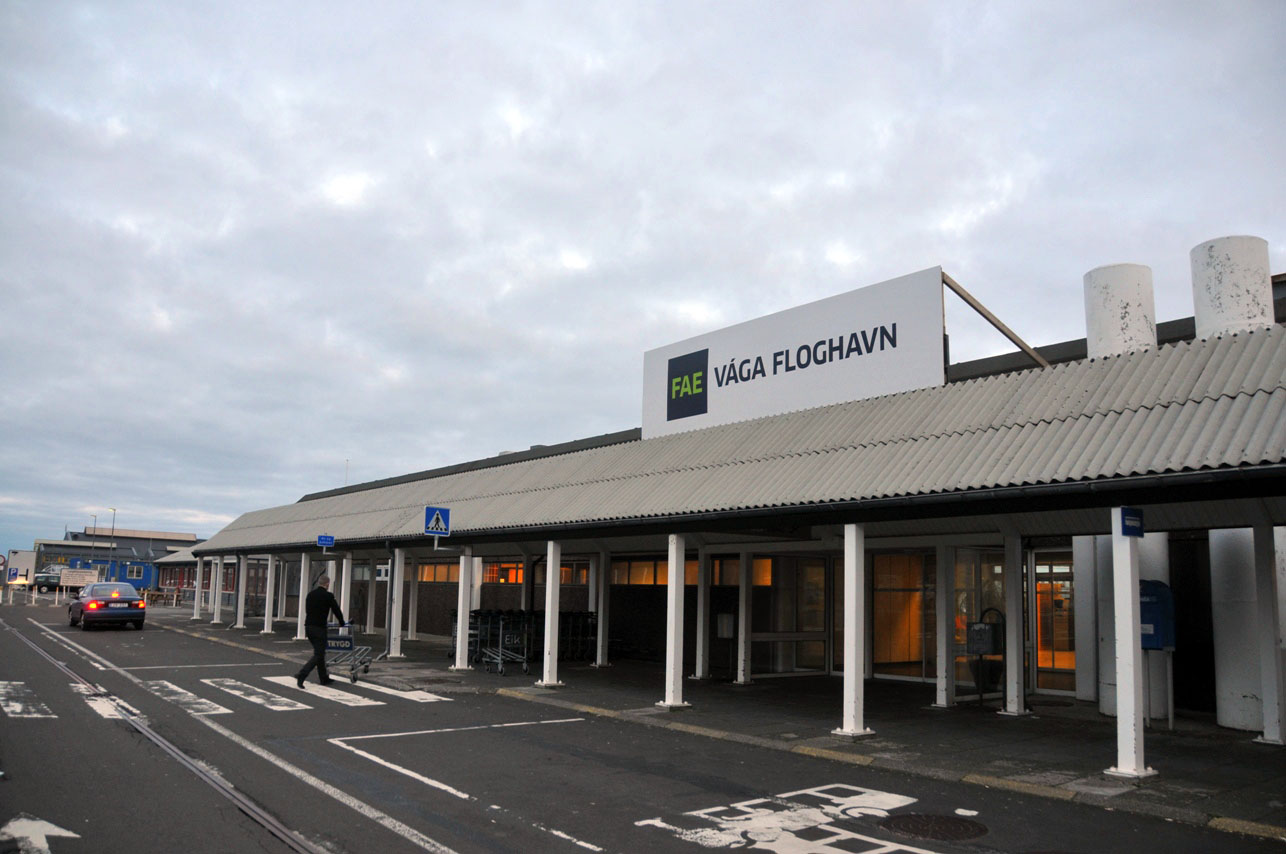
Vágar Airport terminal

Tourism in the Faroe Islands is a growing industry. The official tourist board is Visit Faroe Islands, which is overseen and organized by the Ministry of Environment, Industry and Trade.

Tourism in the islands accounted for 1.4% of the total GDP in 2015. Tourism is much smaller than other industries like fishing, which has dominated the Faroese economy.

== History ==
Fishing has been the primary sector of the Faroese economy for much of the past decades. Fishing accounts for around 90 to 95 percent of exports. However, the economy has begun to diversify.

In 2013, Visit Faroe Islands saw their marketing funds double. In 2014, a new terminal was opened in Vágar Airport, in part due to the tourism increase. Vágar Airport saw the number of passengers increase by 43 percent in the ten years prior to the opening of the new terminal, with expectations of more than 250,000 passengers in 2014. Because of this, the airport hoped that other airline operators would get involved and take advantage of the high amount of traffic between the Faroes and Europe.

Visit Faroe Islands started a campaign called "Closed for Maintenance, Open for Voluntourism" which saw a crew of applicants travel to the Faroe Islands and work with locals to preserve ten locations across the islands, as well as create and maintain hiking paths and set up signposting. The first crew traveled to the islands in April 2019.

In 2018 Guide to Faroe Islands was established, it is a collaboration of organizers of travels, excursions, car rental etc. in the Faroe Islands.

In late 2019, it was announced that Atlantic Airways was preparing to launch non-stop flights to John F. Kennedy International Airport in New York City.

Hilton opened a hotel in the Faroes in late 2020, becoming the first global hotel chain in the islands.

== Impact ==
A study published in the Consortium Journal of Hospitality and Tourism found that over 45% of Faroese respondents believe tourism brings more benefits than problems to the country. The study also found that 95% of respondents would like to see more tourists in their communities.

== Recognition ==
The Faroe Islands have been featured in international media, with companies like The Guardian, Lonely Planet, The Sunday Times, and The Financial Times recommending the islands in 2019.

In 2007, National Geographic Traveler ranked the Faroe Islands 1st out of 111 island communities around the world.

== Statistics ==
Overnight stays statistics, since 2013. These statistics include overnight stays by people from the Faroe Islands.

Overnight stays	2020	2019	2018	2017	2016	2015	2014	2013
Total	▼108,653	▲197,886	▲185,360	▲176,798	▲161,224	▲151,751	▲139,250	132,265
Hotel/hostel and guest-house	▼94,940	▲166,452	▲153,113	▲144,626	▲128,731	▲118,885	▲105,468	100,173
Bed and breakfast	▼365	▼2,120	▼2,447	▼2,539	▼2,633	▲3,438	▲2,064	1,919
House/apartment	▼7,869	▼13,233	▼16,782	▼17,650	▼17,851	▼22,446	▼25,216	27,313
Camping	▼5,479	▲16,081	▲13,018	▼11,983	▼12,009	▲14,937	▲6,502	2,860
