= Battle Ballads =

Studio album by Týr
- Released: 12 April 2024
- Genre: Power metal; folk metal; Viking metal
- Length: 41:35
- Label: Metal Blade
- Producer: Týr

Týr chronology
Hel (2019)	Battle Ballads (2024)

Singles from Battle Ballads
- 1. "Axes" Released: 6 February 2024; 2. "Hammered" Released: 6 March 2024; 3. "Dragons Never Die" Released: 28 March 2024

Battle Ballads is the ninth studio album by Faroese folk metal band Týr. It was released on 12 April 2024 through Metal Blade Records and was self-produced by the band.

== Critical reception ==
Professional ratings
Review scores
Source	Rating
Distorted Sound	8/10
Rock 'n' Load	8/10

The album received generally positive reviews from critics. Scott Wilson of Distorted Sound scored the album 8 out of 10 and called the album "a massive win." Rock 'N' Load praised the album saying, "Battle Ballads is not breaking new ground, however, it is a solid addition to anyone's collection who likes their Folk, Symphonic or Power Metal."

== Track listing ==
All music and lyrics by Heri Joensen, except where noted.

Battle Ballads track listing
No.	Title	Lyrics	Music	Length
1.	"Hammered"		Hammer, Joensen	3:24
2.	"Unwandered Ways"			3:03
3.	"Dragons Never Die"			3:01
4.	"Row"	Joensen, Rieckmann	Joensen, Rieckmann	3:49
5.	"Torkils Døtur"	Faroese traditional	Faroese traditional, arr. Joensen	5:44
6.	"Vælkomnir Føroyingar"	Jóannes Patursson	Danish traditional, arr. Joensen	4:14
7.	"Hangman"		Rieckmann, Joensen	5:17
8.	"Axes"	Joensen, Rieckmann	Thomsen, Joensen	3:32
9.	"Battle Ballad"			3:50
10.	"Causa Latronum Normannorum"	Joensen, Rieckmann quotes from De mensura Orbis terrae by Dicuil		5:37
Total length:				41:35

== Personnel ==
Týr

- Heri Joensen – guitars, lead vocals
- Gunnar H. Thomsen – bass, backing vocals
- Tadeusz Rieckmann – drums
- Hans Hammer – guitars

Production

- Týr – production
- Jacob Hansen – production, mixing
- Gyula Havancsák – artwork

== Charts ==
Chart performance for Battle Ballads
Chart (2024)	Peak position
Swiss Albums (Schweizer Hitparade)	47
