= Ragnarok (Týr album) =

Studio album by Týr
- Released: 22 September 2006
- Studio: Jacob Hansen studio, Denmark
- Genre: Folk metal; progressive metal; Viking metal
- Length: 60:45
- Label: Napalm
- Producer: Týr

Týr chronology
Eric the Red (2003)	Ragnarok (2006)	Land (2008)

Professional ratings
Review scores
Source	Rating
About.com	4/5 stars
AllMusic	4/5 stars
Lords of Metal	(9.3/10)
The Metal Crypt	(4.25/5)

Ragnarok is the third studio album by Faroese folk metal band Týr. It was released on 22 September 2006 by Napalm Records.

The album is bilingual with Faroese and English lyrics. The album features cover art by Jan Yrlund.

== Track listing ==
No.	Title	Lyrics	Music	Length
1.	"The Beginning"		Traditional Faeroese, Heri Joensen, Gunnar H. Thomsen	5:07
2.	"The Hammer of Thor"	Heri Joensen	Traditional Faeroese, Heri Joensen	6:39
3.	"Envy"		Heri Joensen	1:10
4.	"Brother's Bane"	Heri Joensen	Traditional Danish, Heri Joensen	5:00
5.	"The Burning"		Heri Joensen	1:56
6.	"The Ride to Hel"	Heri Joensen	Traditional Faeroese, Heri Joensen	6:12
7.	"Torsteins Kvæði"	Traditional Faeroese	Traditional Faeroese, arr. Heri Joensen	4:55
8.	"Grímur á Miðalnesi"	Traditional Faeroese	Traditional Faeroese	0:56
9.	"Wings of Time"	Heri Joensen, Traditional Faeroese	Heri Joensen, Traditional Faeroese	6:25
10.	"The Rage of the Skullgaffer"		Heri Joensen, Terji Skibenæs	2:01
11.	"The Hunt"	Heri Joensen	Heri Joensen, Terji Skibenæs, Traditional Faeroese	5:47
12.	"Victory"		Traditional Faeroese, arr. Heri Joensen	0:58
13.	"Lord of Lies"	Heri Joensen	Traditional Faeroese, Heri Joensen	6:03
14.	"Gjallarhornið"		Heri Joensen	0:27
15.	"Ragnarok"	Heri Joensen	Traditional Faeroese, Heri Joensen, Gunnar H. Thomsen	6:32
16.	"The End"		Traditional Faeroese, Heri Joensen, Gunnar H. Thomsen	0:37
Total length:				60:45

Digipack Edition Only
No.	Title	Lyrics	Music	Length
17.	"Valkyries Flight"		Traditional Irish, arr. Heri Joensen	2:03
18.	"Valhalla"	Heri Joensen	Traditional Irish, Heri Joensen	5:03
Total length:				67:54

== Personnel ==
- Heri Joensen – vocals, guitar
- Terji Skibenæs – guitar
- Gunnar H. Thomsen – bass
- Kári Streymoy – drums
