= Tóra Sigmundsdóttir =

Faroese woman known from saga literature

Tóra Sigmundsdóttir, also Thora Sigmundsdóttir (c.979 – ?) was a Norwegian-Faroese woman, whose life is known from the Færeyinga saga. Daughter of chief Sigmundur Brestisson, she was known for her Christianity and intellect.

== Life ==
The daughter of Sigmundur Brestisson and Þurið Þorkilsdóttir, Tóra Sigmundsdóttir was born c.979 whilst Sigmundur was a guest of Þorkilsdóttir's father. As a young child she lived with her mother at the farm, until her parents finally married in the court of Haaron Jarl in 986 and settled in Sigmundur's house on the island of Skúvoy in the Faroe Islands. Her parents subsequently had four sons: Toralvur, Steingrimim, Brandur and Heri.

In 1005, as a result of power struggles, the house in Skúvoy was set on fire, and her father, although he was able to escape from his enemies by swimming, was killed by a local farmer. After this episode, Sigmundur's main opponent, Tróndur í Gøtu, and his foster son, Leivur Øssursson, remained the only lords of the Faroe Islands. They sought reconciliation with Sigmundur's widow, Þurið, and her children, but the family did not accept the approach. Later, on behalf of Leivur, Tróndur asked for the hand of Tóra, who made it a condition of their marriage that he search for her father's killer, and prove his own innocence. He found the killers and hanged them. Around 1010, Leivur married Tóra and they settled on the estate of his ancestors, Hov. The two rival families were temporarily reconciled.

In 1027 Tróndur's nephews murdered Sigmundsdóttir's brother Toralvur and acquitted themselves of the crime two years later. At this time, the Faroes were divided into three by Tróndur: one for him, one for Leivur, and one for Sigmundsdóttir's surviving brothers. Her son, Sigmund, was also fostered by Tróndur. In the face of these actions, Sigmundsdóttir and her mother put pressure on Leivur to avenge the family. In order for this to happen, they had to remove Sigmund, from Tróndur's house, which she did by trickery. Then in 1035 Leivur took revenge and killed Tróndur's nephews, and their uncle died of grief.

Leivur died sometime during the reign of King Magnus I, who died in 1047. His son Sigmund took his place, and Tóra Sigmundsdóttir lived in his house in Suðuroy until her death some time later.

== Historiography ==
Sigmundsdóttir, along with her mother, is notable for her Christianity in the saga. She also had a reputation in the saga, as quick-witted and a political strategist.
