= Hel (album) =

Studio album by Týr
- Released: 8 March 2019
- Genre: Power metal; folk metal; progressive metal; Viking metal
- Length: 69:53
- Label: Metal Blade
- Producer: Týr

Týr chronology
Valkyrja (2013)	Hel (2019)	Battle Ballads (2024)

Hel is the eighth studio album by Faroese folk metal band Týr, released by Metal Blade Records on 8 March 2019.

== Promotion and release ==
Hel was released in 2019, six years after the band's seventh album, Valkyrja. On 10 January 2019, the group streamed a single titled "Fire and Flame", which predated the album and was included in it two months later.

Production for the album was long due to the band's tours with Children of Bodom in North America and participation with 70000 Tons of Metal while on a cruise.

== Critical reception ==
Professional ratings
Review scores
Source	Rating
Distorted Sound	7/10
Exclaim!	7/10
Folk 'n' Rock	8.8/10
Infernal Masquerade	96/100
New Noise	2.5/5 stars

Andrea Caccese of Folk 'n' Rock called Hel a "dynamic, pristine character, which combines lush, sophisticated structures, with the classic fury and unapologetic energy of metal". She also added that "fans of the band will be delighted with [it]", calling Hel an "excellent album" and an "amazing opportunity for new fans to get to discover a fantastic band with a unique flavor".

== Track listing ==
Hel track listing
No.	Title	Length
1.	"Gates of Hel"	6:42
2.	"All Heroes Fall"	5:16
3.	"Ragnars Kvæði"	4:08
4.	"Garmr"	4:53
5.	"Sunset Shore"	4:42
6.	"Downhill Drunk"	4:27
7.	"Empire of the North"	5:11
8.	"Far from the Worries of the World"	5:35
9.	"King of Time"	4:57
10.	"Fire and Flame"	5:39
11.	"Against the Gods"	5:43
12.	"Songs of War"	5:16
13.	"Álvur Kongur"	7:24
Total length:		69:53

== Personnel ==
- Heri Joensen – guitars, vocals
- Terji Skibenæs – guitars
- Gunnar H. Thomsen – bass
- Tadeusz Rieckmann – drums

== Charts ==
Chart performance for Hel
Chart (2019)	Peak position
Austrian Albums (Ö3 Austria)	60
German Albums (Offizielle Top 100)	31
Swiss Albums (Schweizer Hitparade)	36
