= Þurið Þorkilsdóttir =

Norwegian-Faroese chieftain's wife

Þuríðr Þorkilsdóttir (Faroese Turið Torkilsdóttir, Icelandic Þuríður, Norwegian Turid) sometimes anglicized as Thurid (ca. 960-ca. 1047) was a powerful, influential woman in the Faroe Islands during the Viking Age.

== Biography ==
She was born at Ulfdal in Dovrefjell, Norway and died in Skúvoy. Þuríðr was the daughter of Ragnhild Þoralfsdóttir and Þorkil Barfrost. Around 986, she married Sigmundur Brestisson on his third visit to Norway. According to the Færeyinga saga, the wedding took place at the farm of Jarl Håkon Sigurdsson near Trondheim and lasted for seven days. She had a daughter with him, Þóra. That autumn, the couple and their daughter moved to the Faroes, where Þuríðr lived the rest of her life. Þuríðr and Sigmundr later had four sons, Þórálfr, Steingrímr, Brandr and Heri Sigmundsson, who all lived on the farm in Skúvoy. After her husband's death in 1005, she was generally called Þuríðr meginekkja, meaning 'powerful widow'.

== In popular culture ==
The Faroese heavy metal band Týr wrote a song with the name Turið Torkilsdóttir for the album By the Light of the Northern Star.
