= Ólavur Riddararós =

Single by Týr
- Released: 2002
- Studio: Happy Alley Studio, Copenhagen
- Genre: Folk metal; progressive metal; Viking metal
- Length: 11:21
- Label: TUTL
- Songwriter(s): Traditional
- Producer(s): Týr

"Ólavur Riddararós" is a song by Faroese folk metal band Týr, released as a single in October 2002 by TUTL Records. The song is an adaptation of the Faroese ballad of the same name, a variant of the Elveskud ballad.

This is the only Týr release to feature Allan Streymoy's vocals, who joined the band after Pól Arni Holm's departure. The band considers, in retrospect, Streymoy's hiring and the single's release to be a "rash decision".

== Track listing ==
No.	Title	Lyrics	Music	Length
1.	"Ólavur Riddararós"	(Traditional)	(Traditional)	4:36
2.	"Stýrisvølurin"	(Traditional), H. Joensen	H. Joensen	6:45
Total length:				11:21

== Personnel ==
- Allan Streymoy – vocals
- Terji Skibenæs – guitar
- Heri Joensen – guitar
- Gunnar H. Thomsen – bass
- Kári Streymoy – drums

Production

- Mastered by Steen Svare and Jens Rud
- Mixed by Steen Svare and Jens Rud
- Recorded by Steen Svare and Jens Rud
