= Høgni Reistrup =

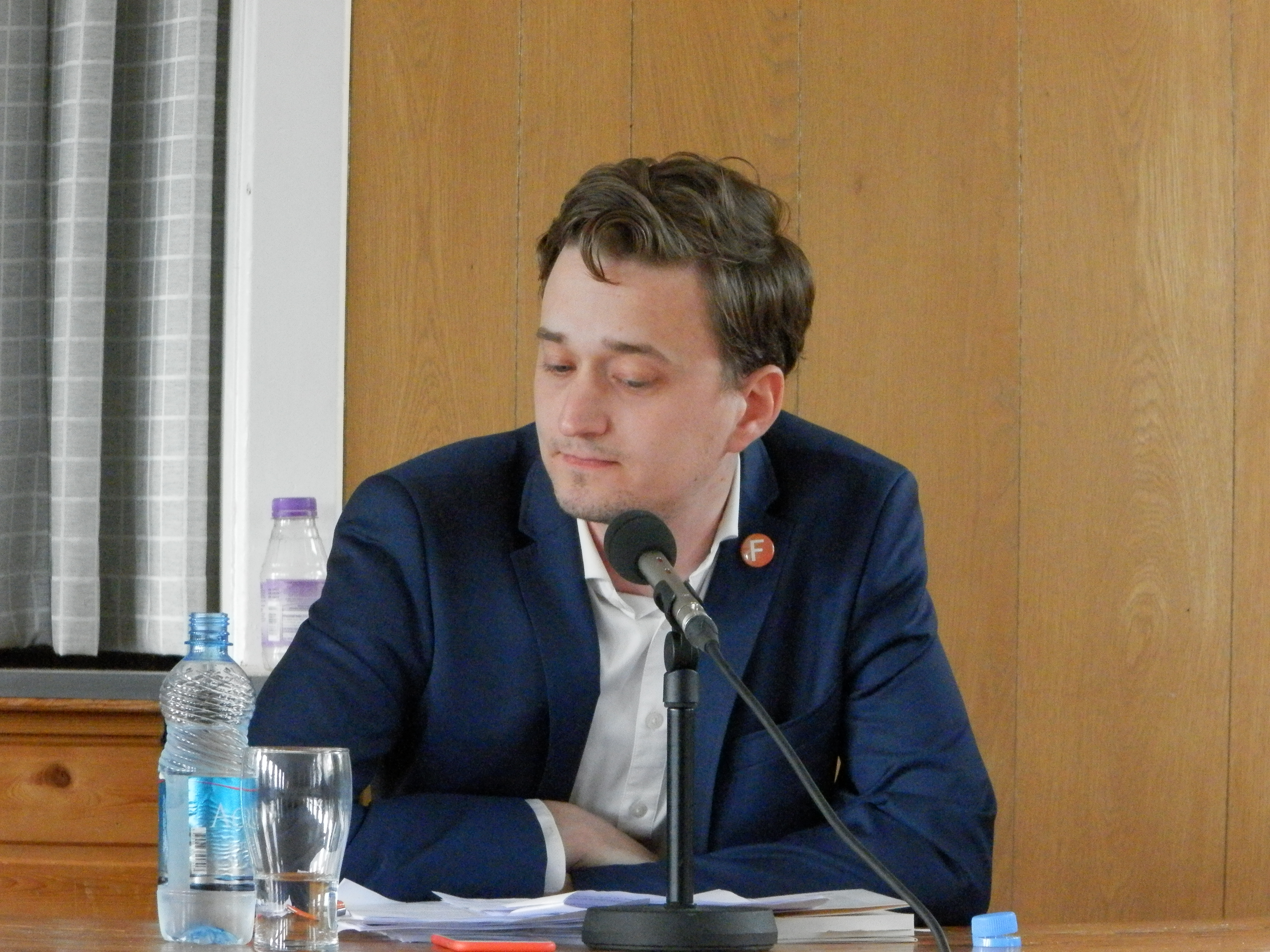
- Høgni Reistrup

Background information
- Born: Høgni Reistrup; 1984 (age 41–42)
- Origin: Faroe Islands
- Genres: Electronic music, folk music, pop music
- Occupation: Artist
- Years active: 2003–present
- Label: Tutl
- Member of: Lawetz
- Website: Høgni Reistrup, Record label

Høgni Reistrup (artistic name Högni Reistrup, born 1984) is a Faroese singer, musician, writer and scientist from Tórshavn, Faroe Islands. He is the co-writer of the book Exit Føroyar (which means Exit Faroe Islands); he wrote it together with Heri á Rógvi. The books was published in 2012 and created a major debate in the Faroe Islands and in Denmark about the problems the Faroe Islands were facing with population decline in the islands, where the biggest problems seemed to be that half of the young people who moved away to study abroad never moved back again; especially the women did not move back again. After a period of six years with negative net migration in the Faroe Islands, the country saw an increase in the population in 2014 and 2015.

As a musician Høgni Reistrup has released four albums and is a popular singer in the Faroe Islands, his albums receiving good reviews abroad as well as at home. His third album received four stars from the Danish magazine Gaffa and he has been nominated several times for Faroese musical awards.

== Education, work and politics ==
Reistrup is MA in Media studies. He studied Media Studies and Organisational Development at the Aarhus University from 2005 to 2008 and took his BA degree in 2008. He continued his studies at the University of Copenhagen where he took his MA degree in 2010. He took a part of the post graduate studies at the Dublin City University. His final thesis was published in 2010, it has the title Entering the real-time web – understanding how companies engage their brands on the real-time web.

He has published three books about Faroese politics and about the problems the Faroe Islands are facing when young people move to other countries mainly to study and around half of them never move back again. The book Exit Føroyar which he wrote together with Heri á Rógvi is treating this problem. The Faroe Islands have amongst the highest birthrates in Europe, the fertility rate for Faroese women was 2.5 in 2014 while Danish women gave birth to 1.7 child and Greenlandic women gave birth to 2.3. But the population has not grown for several years in the Faroe Islands because more people are moving away from the Faroe Islands than people who are moving to the Faroe Islands. Reistrup was himself one of the young Faroese who lived abroad for several years while studying, he lived in Denmark for 12 years, but moved back to the Faroes again in 2013.

Reistrup worked as a reporter for the Kringvarp Føroya in the summer periods from 2006 to 2010. In 2009 he worked for the Danish Radio where he did some research and surveys. In 2008 he was a member of a research team of The North Atlantic Group and the Danish Parliament. The research topic was: An investigation of why a large amount of people from the Faroe Islands choose to settle down in Denmark. In 2011 he worked for eight months as a secretary for the Danish Ministry of Culture. In 2012 he worked as a Social Media Editor for Eversheds Copenhagen. In April 2012 he started working on the project Exit Føroyar together with Heri á Rógvi. The aim of EXIT Føroyar was to stimulate population growth in the Faroe Islands. At the time of writing, the country had a negative net migration. Reistrup and á Rógvi published the book Exit Føroyar in 2012 and the book caused much debate in the Faroe Islands and in Denmark. The two authors were invited to give speeches in the Folketing on 4 April 2013. Two years later, on 31 July 2014, there was a growth in the population of the Faroe Islands, both the birth rate and the net migration were positive. On 31 December 2014 there continued to be a growth in the population of the Faroe Islands, the net migration was 294 people and the total population was 48 724.

From September 2012 to June 2013 he worked as a communication consultant on Christiansborg Palace where he was advising MPs, MEPs, and ministers on the use of digital media. Since June 2013 he has worked as a communications consultant for Tórshavnar Municipality.

In 2015 he was a candidate for the election for the Løgting for Framsókn; he was not elected, became number 10 of 17. The party got two members elected. Again in 2019 he was a candidate for the elections for the Faroese parliament for Framsókn (Progress), he was not elected, but his party got two members elected.

In 2018 Reistrup founded the online travel platform Guide to Faroe Islands, he is the CEO for the company. In March 2019 Guide to Faroe Islands was nominated for the prize "Breakthrough of the Year" (Faroese: Ársins nýbrot) by the Tourist Association of the Faroese House of Industry.

== Musical career ==
His musical influences include Radiohead, Depeche Mode, and The Cure. Artists such as Bob Dylan, Nick Drake, and Kári P. epitomises Reistrup's early work. He has a background in classical music which we find examples of in the period between 2007 and 2010. Songs such as "Friðsæla Stund" from the album Hugafar á ferð and "Náttarvøka" from the album Trý fet frá tilveruni have clear references to classical music. He was a member and founder of the Faroese band Lawetz in 2002. The band competed at the Prix Føroyar music competition in 2003 and 2005, but did not win.

== Discography ==
=== Albums ===
- 2007 – Hugafar á ferð
- 2010 – Trý fet frá tilveruni
- 2011 – Samrøður við framtíðina
- 2013 – Áðrenn vit hvørva

==== About the albums ====
Reistrup released his debut album titled Hugafar á ferð in the summer of 2007. The first single from the album reached No. 1 on the official chart in the Faroe Islands.

His second album, Trý fet frá tilveruni, was released on 1 March 2010. The album was recorded in the Faroe Islands and mixed in Dublin.

Reistrup's third album Samrøður við framtíðina was released on 18 November 2011. The album was recorded on the Faroe Islands and mixed in Reykjavík by Styrmir Hauksson. It got four of six stars in a review from the Danish musical magazine Gaffa.

Reistrup released his fourth album on 2 December 2013. The album is titled Áðrenn vit hvørva. The album was recorded in Berlin in August 2012 and in Reykjavík in November 2012 and June 2013. Áðrenn vit hvørva – or "Before we disappear" – is produced by Ólavur Jákupsson and Janus Rasmussen. The song "Vegurin" was the first single from the album and was released 1 August 2013.

Høgni is signed to the independent Faroese record label, Tutl.

Reistrup has played in countries such as England, Scotland, Iceland, Germany, Denmark, and The Faroe Islands.

== Bibliography ==
- 2010 – Entering the real-time web – understanding how companies engage their brands on the real-time web – Master's thesis.
- 2011 – Valið og valdið, Høgni Reistrup, Stefan í Skorini, 258 pages, ISBN 978-99918-71-74-5
- 2012 – Exit Føroyar, Heri á Rógvi and Høgni Reistrup, Sprotin
- 2015 – Framtíðin er okkara, Høgni Reistrup, Sprotin, ISBN 978-99972-1-156-9

== Awards and nominations ==
- 2015 – Nominated for Faroese Music Awards in the pop/rock category for Best band or artist of the year
- 2015 – Nominated for Faroese Music Awards in the pop/rock category for Best male singer of the year
- 2014 – Nominated for Faroese Music Awards in the pop/rock category for Best male singer of the year
- 2014 – Nominated for Faroese Music Awards in the pop/rock category for Best band or artist of the year
- 2011 – Nominated for Planet Awards in the category Best singer of the year
- 2011 – Nominated for Planet Awards in the category Best artist of the year
