= The Lay of Thrym =

Studio album by Týr
- Released: 27 May 2011
- Recorded: 2011
- Genres: Folk metal; power metal; progressive metal; Viking metal
- Length: 46:00
- Label: Napalm
- Producer: Týr

Týr chronology
By the Light of the Northern Star (2009)	The Lay of Thrym (2011)	Valkyrja (2013)

Professional ratings
Review scores
Source	Rating
About.com	4/5 stars
AllMusic	4/5 stars
Angry Metal Guy	4/5 stars

The Lay of Thrym is the sixth studio album by Faroese folk metal band Týr. The name of the album comes from one of the best known poems from the Poetic Edda, called "Þrymskviða", "The Lay of Thrym". The band revealed the name of the album along with its release date on their MySpace page. The cover artwork is by Gyula Havancsák. This would be the band's last album with long-time drummer Kári Streymoy.

== Track listing ==
No.	Title	Lyrics	Music	Length
1.	"Flames of the Free"	Heri Joensen	Heri Joensen	4:17
2.	"Shadow of the Swastika"	Heri Joensen	Heri Joensen	4:23
3.	"Take Your Tyrant"	Heri Joensen	Heri Joensen	3:53
4.	"Evening Star"	Heri Joensen	Danish Traditional, Heri Joensen	5:05
5.	"Hall of Freedom"	Heri Joensen	Heri Joensen	4:07
6.	"Fields of the Fallen"	Heri Joensen	Terji Skibenæs, Heri Joensen	4:59
7.	"Konning Hans"	Danish / Faeroese Traditional	Danish / Faeroese Traditional, Heri Joensen	4:28
8.	"Ellindur bóndi á Jaðri"	Heri Joensen	Faeroese Traditional, Heri Joensen	3:55
9.	"Nine Worlds of Lore"	Heri Joensen	Faeroese Traditional, Heri Joensen	4:04
10.	"The Lay of Thrym"	Heri Joensen	Gunnar H. Thomsen, Heri Joensen	6:48
Total length:				46:00

Limited edition bonus tracks
No.	Title	Lyrics	Music	Length
11.	"I" (Black Sabbath cover)	Ronnie James Dio	Geezer Butler, Ronnie James Dio, Tony Iommi	4:43
12.	"Stargazer" (Rainbow cover)	Ronnie James Dio	Ritchie Blackmore, Ronnie James Dio	6:19
Total length:				57:02
