= Guide to Faroe Islands =

Faroese tourism company

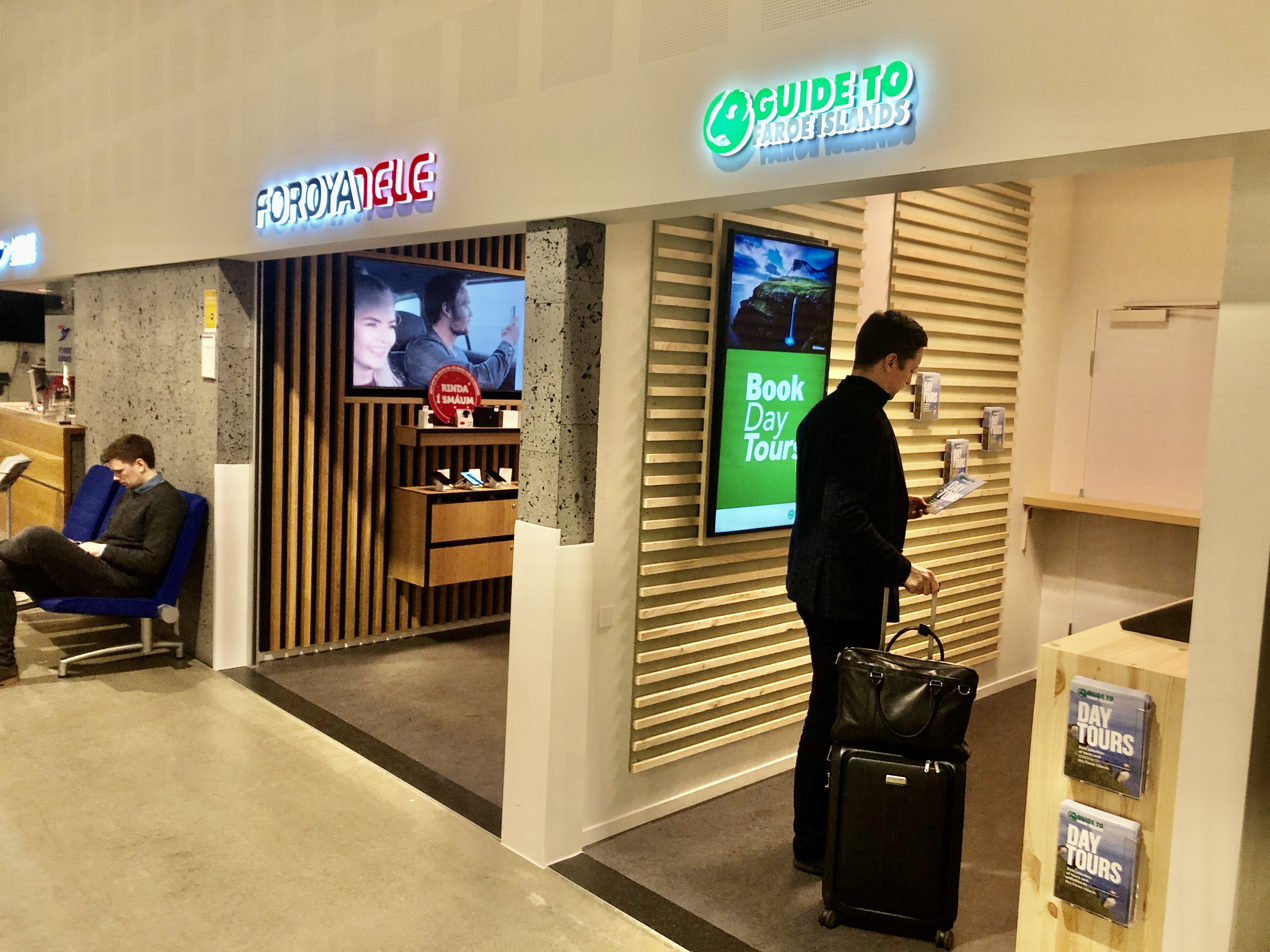
- Industry: Travel
- Founded: 1 May 2018; 8 years ago
- Founder: Høgni Reistrup
- Headquarters: Tórshavn, Faroe Islands
- Number of locations: 2 (2019)
- Area served: Faroe Islands
- Products: Travel services
- Owner: SP/F GTFI
- Website: www.guidetofaroeislands.fo

Guide to Faroe Islands is a Faroese company which was founded in 2018 by Høgni Reistrup and others. It was subsided by the Faroese Government through Vinnuframi. The company is a collaboration of organizers of travels, excursions, car rental etc. in the Faroes. It consists of more than 100 travel companies and individuals and is the largest of its kind in the Faroe Islands. The company and its founder were mentioned by Forbes in 2022.

== History ==
Guide to Faroe Islands was established in 2018 by Høgni Reistrup as a travel marketplace of tailored tours for visitors to the Faroe Islands, collaborating only with local providers based in the islands. The season is mainly during the summer months. Through 2020 and 2021 the company struggled due to the pandemic and the lack of foreign tourists. The company survived through the pandemic and in 2022 and 2023 things were almost back to normal and the travel marketplace had around 150 tailored tours for tourists. Some of the guided tours by Guide to Faroe Islands are inspired from films like James Bond or TV-series like Trom.

=== The James Bond tombstone ===
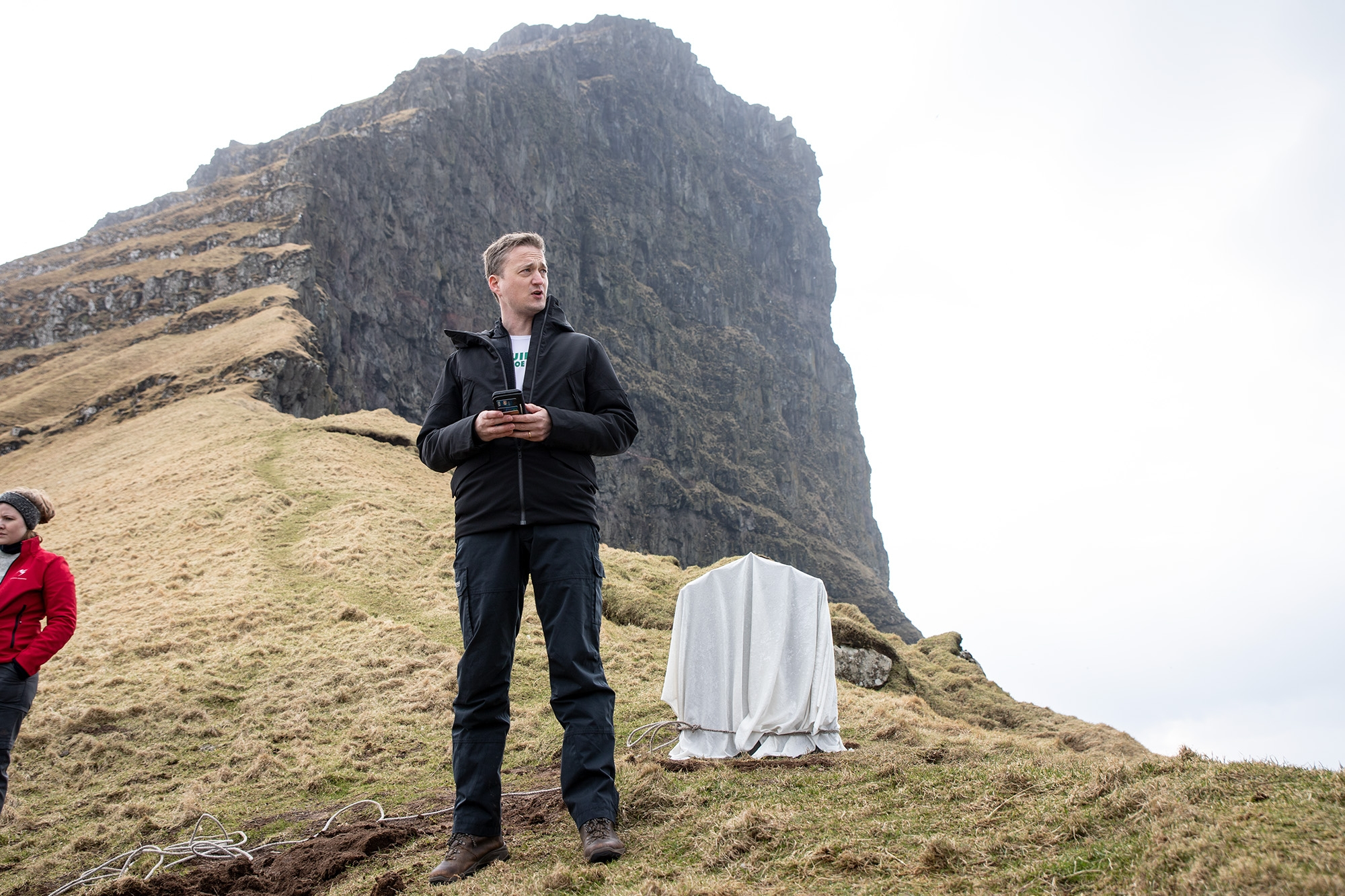
Høgni Reistrup at Kallurin, Kalsoy, in March 2022 when the James Bond tombstone was unveiled.

In 2022 the CEO of Guide to Faroe Islands, Høgni Reistrup, was one of the people who came with the idea to erect a tomb stone for the fictional character James Bond next to the Kallur lighthouse in the north of the island Kalsoy. Among these was a tour to the island of Kalsoy where the dramatic final scene from No Time to Die was shot. On a location north of the small village Trøllanes, there is now a ‘James Bond Tombstone’ to which tours are made. The tombstone was unveiled by the Faroese Prime Minister.

== Honour ==
- 2018 - Newcomer of the Year (Faroese company) - Nominated
