= Týr (band) =

Faroese folk metal band

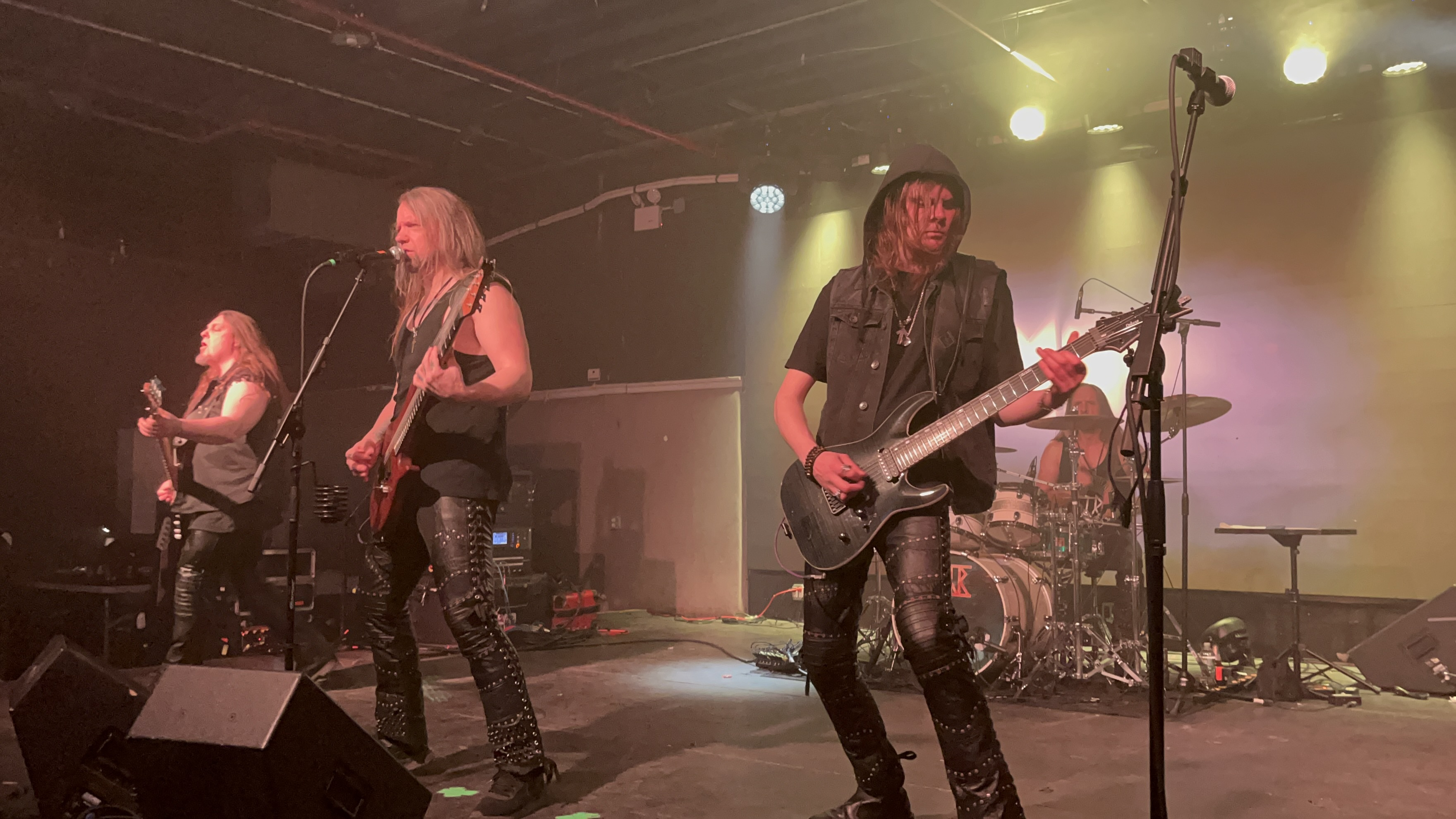
- Týr performing in 2025

Background information
- Origin: Tórshavn, Faroe Islands
- Genres: Folk metal; Viking metal; progressive metal; power metal
- Years active: 1998–present
- Labels: Napalm, Tutl, Metal Blade
- Members: Heri Joensen; Gunnar H. Thomsen; Tadeusz Rieckmann; Hans Hammer
- Past members: Jón Joensen; Pól Arni Holm; Allan Streymoy; Ottó P. Arnarson; Kári Streymoy; Amon Djurhuus; Terji Skibenæs; Attila Vörös
- Website: tyr.fo

Týr (Faroese: [tʰʊɪːɹ]) is a folk metal band from the Faroe Islands. They have been characterised as one of "the islands' two most successful metal bands". Their subject matter revolves almost entirely around Viking lore, mythology, and history, taking their name from Týr, the god of war in Norse religion.

== History ==
The band logo

Before Týr, Heri Joensen and Gunnar H. Thomsen formed their first band, Cruiser, at the age of 17. Streymoy also played with them for a short while. They later changed their name to Wolfgang. Although neither band released any albums, Wolfgang, who are still active, recorded an undisclosed number of songs that, according to Joensen, are "pretty much ready to release".

Týr formed in Copenhagen, Denmark in 1998. Heri Joensen met his old bandmate, Kári Streymoy, at a party in January in Copenhagen. Joensen suggested to Streymoy that they should meet up and jam. Streymoy initially declined, but later took him up on his offer. They were soon joined by another former bandmate, bassist Gunnar H. Thomsen, expanding the duo into a trio. In 2001, guitarist Terji Skibenæs joined the band.

They signed a worldwide deal with Austria's Napalm Records in early 2006, while signed to the Faroese record label Tutl. In September 2012, they signed a three-album deal with Metal Blade Records.

They began making music which was heavily inspired by Norse mythology, kvæði (Faroese traditional music), and heavy metal music in general. According to the band's frontman Heri Joensen:

"Týr's musical mission is to break down the walls that are erected between all the kinds of metal that have arisen over the years. Power, doom, black, progressive, gothic, viking, folk, ethnic and epic metal. Walls and labels do nothing but fill people with prejudice."

— Heri Joensen

Canadian writer Joshua Green claimed that the band's insistence on their Faroese identity, which has been fetishised by international audiences, could be "regarded as a form of self-exoticisation". The band's handling of traditional songs is characterised by fidelity to traditional melodies, but more complex and innovative handling of associated chord progressions and harmonies.

The band has been accused of promoting Nazi ideologies through their use of runes and other imagery appropriated by Nazis. The band responded to these accusations with the song "Shadow of the Swastika" on the album Lay of Thrym (2011), which in the assessment of Karl Spracklen, "attacks the far-right for appropriating...heathen symbols and images associated with pre-Christian northern Europe". Even so, scholars have, in the words of Catherine Hoad and Samuel Whiting, suggested that "through imagining the Viking as an ancestral, genetic category, the 'common past' of the Nordic people is constructed as a self-identity apart from other people" in the work of Týr. Likewise, Spracklen finds that "the themes in Týr's songs celebrate pagan identity, Viking identity and the hegemonic masculinity of the Viking warrior combined with the modern-day heavy metal anthem of being an individual".

The band released the song "Rainbow Warrior", a song about the Sea Shepherd Conservation Society in response to their campaign against whaling in the Faroe Islands. Joensen defended the whaling in a debate with Paul Watson.

== Tours ==
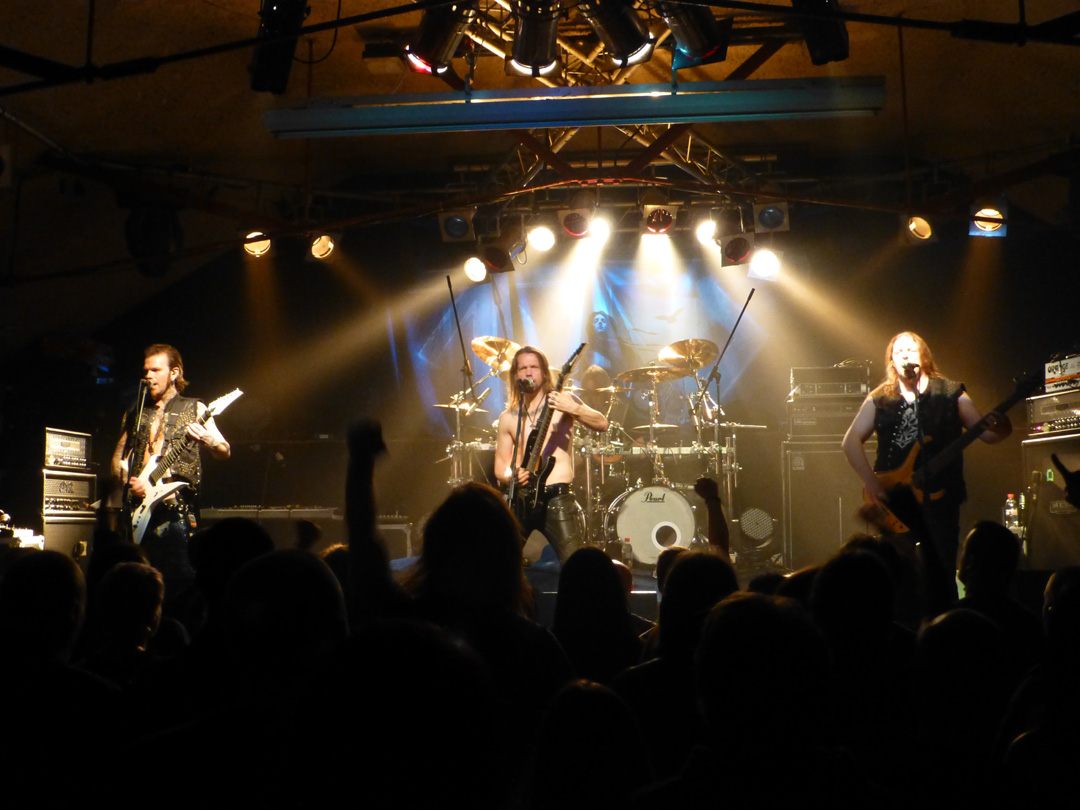
Týr performing live in Bilston, Wolverhampton in 2013

Týr performed at the Ragnarök Festival in 2007 and 2009.

They were part of the Paganfest tour in Europe and the U.S. in 2008, with Ensiferum headlining. Other bands on the tour included Eluveitie, Turisas in the United States, and Moonsorrow and Korpiklaani joined them on the European part of the tour.

In 2009, the band also took part in the "Black Sails over Europe" tour, supporting Alestorm, who were promoting their album Black Sails at Midnight.

Later, in 2010, the band would support Amon Amarth and Holy Grail on Amon Amarth's North American tour for select dates.

In January 2011 and 2013, Týr played on the 70000 Tons of Metal cruise ship event with 40 other bands.

In 2012, the band supported Korpiklaani on their "Manala" tour in the U.S. and Canada along with Metsatöll and Moonsorrow.

During April 2013, Týr joined Ensiferum, Heidevolk and others for the North American leg of the Paganfest tour.

The band took part in a European tour between 6 September and 14 October 2013 with Finnish folk metal band Finntroll and Icelandic band Skálmöld. The tour was called "Blodsvept over Europe".

== Recent years ==
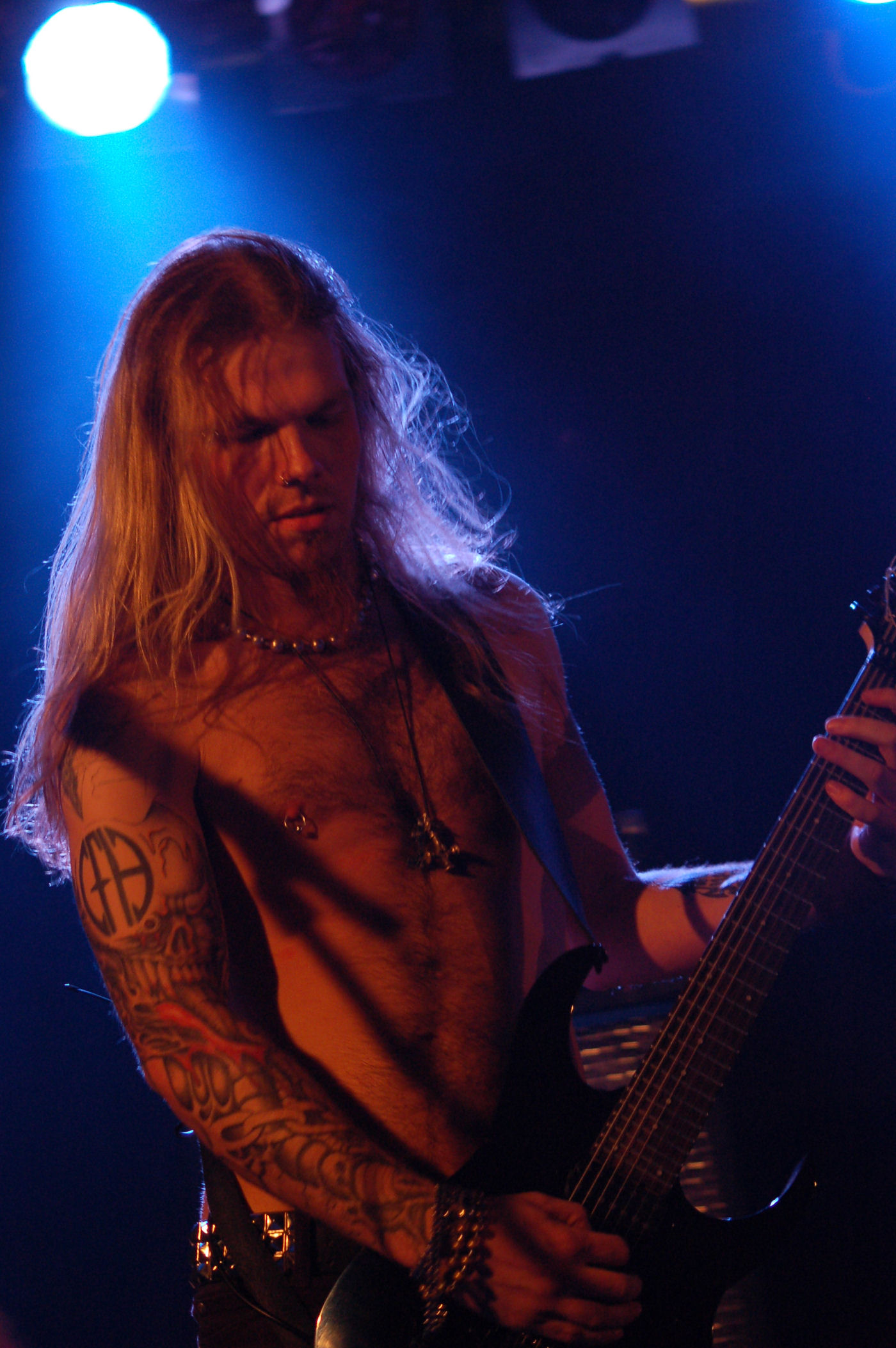
Terji Skibenæs at Metalmania 2007

Singer Pól Arni Holm and guitarist Jón Joensen (Heri Joensen's brother) were part of the band while they recorded How Far to Asgaard but left soon after its release.

Terji Skibenæs joined after Jón Joensen had left the band. Allan Streymoy (Kári Streymoy's brother) took over singing duties for a brief time during which they released the single "Ólavur Riddararós". After Allan left, Heri Joensen took over the vocals. It was this line up which recorded Eric the Red.

Skibenæs left the band for a while after the release of Eric the Red. The band played as a trio for some time. In the summer of 2004 they were joined by Icelandic guitarist Ottó P. Arnarson for a very brief time. When Arnarson left, Skibenæs came back.

Kári Streymoy had a back injury in January 2008, which made him unable to tour until October the same year. Amon Djurhuus, a Faeroese drummer and student of Kári Streymoy, played the drums on the European part of the Paganfest, Merlin Sutter from Eluveitie filled for him on the US part and Daniel Ryan from Gigan on the Canadian part. After that for the festival tour in Europe Amon Djurhuus filled for Kári again. In October 2008 Kári Streymoy was ready to go again for the Ragnarök's Aaskereia Festival Tour.

Týr announced on 12 May 2013 via their official website as well as their Facebook, Twitter and Myspace pages that they had parted ways with longtime drummer Kári Streymoy, owing to the back injury he had received in 2008 which had affected his drumming. On 15 May 2013, they announced that George Kollias will record drums for their seventh album Valkyrja. Amon Djurhuus enters temporarily in the band, once again, for the tour with Finntroll between September and October 2013.

In August 2018, after 17 years with the band, Terji Skibenæs announced his departure, stating "There's no drama or anything going on between me and the others. It's just me not having any joy to play the music in the style of TÝR anymore. I want to thank Heri Joensen and Gunnar Thomsen for the all the time we had and I wish TÝR all the best in the future." The opening left by Skibenæs' exit was filled by former Nevermore and Satyricon guitarist Attila Vörös.

In June 2021, it was announced that Hans Hammer would be Attila Vörös' replacement.

=== Side projects ===
Current Týr lead singer, Heri Joensen, is working on a side project with the band Heljareyga. They released their self-titled debut album in 2010. All lyrics on the album are in Faroese. It was released first as a download on 12 February 2010 at digital retailers, but CD copies came later available at Tutl Records.

Heri also had the side project 'Surma' with Czech singer Viktorie Surmová. Their first and only album, The Light Within, was released on 1 November 2020.

Hans Hammer in addition to releasing solo tracks has his own band named Asyllex.

== Band members ==
=== Current ===
- Heri Joensen – guitars, lead vocals (1998–present)
- Gunnar H. Thomsen – bass, backing vocals (1998–present)
- Tadeusz Rieckmann – drums (2016–present)
- Hans Hammer – guitars (2021–present)

=== Former ===
- Kári Streymoy – drums (1998–2013)
- Pól Arni Holm – lead vocals (1998–2002)
- Jón Joensen – guitars, lead vocals (1998–2000)
- Terji Skibenæs – guitars, backing vocals (2001–2018)
- Allan Streymoy – lead vocals (2002)
- Ottó P. Arnarson – guitars (2004)
- Amon Djurhuus – drums (2014–2016)
- Attila Vörös – guitars (2018–2020)

== Discography ==
=== Albums ===
- How Far to Asgaard (2002)
- Eric the Red (2003)
- Ragnarok (2006)
- Land (2008)
- By the Light of the Northern Star (2009)
- The Lay of Thrym (2011)
- Valkyrja (2013)
- Hel (2019)
- Battle Ballads (2024)
- Týr (2026)

=== EPs/demos/singles ===
- Demo (2000)
- Ólavur Riddararós (2002)
- The Rune (2025)
- Cycle of Misery (2026)
- The Guardian Lie (2026)

=== Compilation albums ===
- Tutl 25 ár – Live 2002 (contributed "Sand in the Wind") (2002, live)
- The Realm of Napalm Records (CD/DVD) (on DVD, track No. 17 "Regin Smiður" and No. 18 "Hail to the Hammer"; on CD, track No. 13 "Regin Smiður") (2006)
- Black Sails Over Europe (2009, split album with Alestorm and Heidevolk)
- The Best of the Napalm Years (2024)

=== Live albums ===
- A Night at the Nordic House (2022)

=== Videos ===
- "Hail to the Hammer" (2002)
- "Ormurin Langi" (2002)
- "Regin Smiður" (2003)
- "Sinklars Vísa" (2008)
- "Hold the Heathen Hammer High" (2009)
- "Flames of the Free" (2011)
- "Blood of Heroes" (2013)
- "The Lay of Our Love" (2014)
- "Sunset Shore" (2019)
- "Ragnars Kvæði" (2019)
- "Axes" (2024)
- "Hammered" (2024)
- "Dragons Never Die" (2024)
- "The Rune" (2025)
- "Cycle of Misery" (2026)
- "The Guardian Lie" (2026)
