= TUTL Records =

- Founded: 1977
- Founder: Kristian Blak
- Distributor(s): Factory 92
- Genre: Various
- Country of origin: Faroe Islands
- Location: Tórshavn
- Official website: www.tutl.com

TUTL Records is a record label of the Faroe Islands that was founded in 1977 by Kristian Blak. The label is credited with giving many Faroese musicians their first break and "has played a major role in giving musicians a chance to record and publish." Tutl Records won the Export Prize of the Year at the 2024 Faroese Music Awards.

== History ==
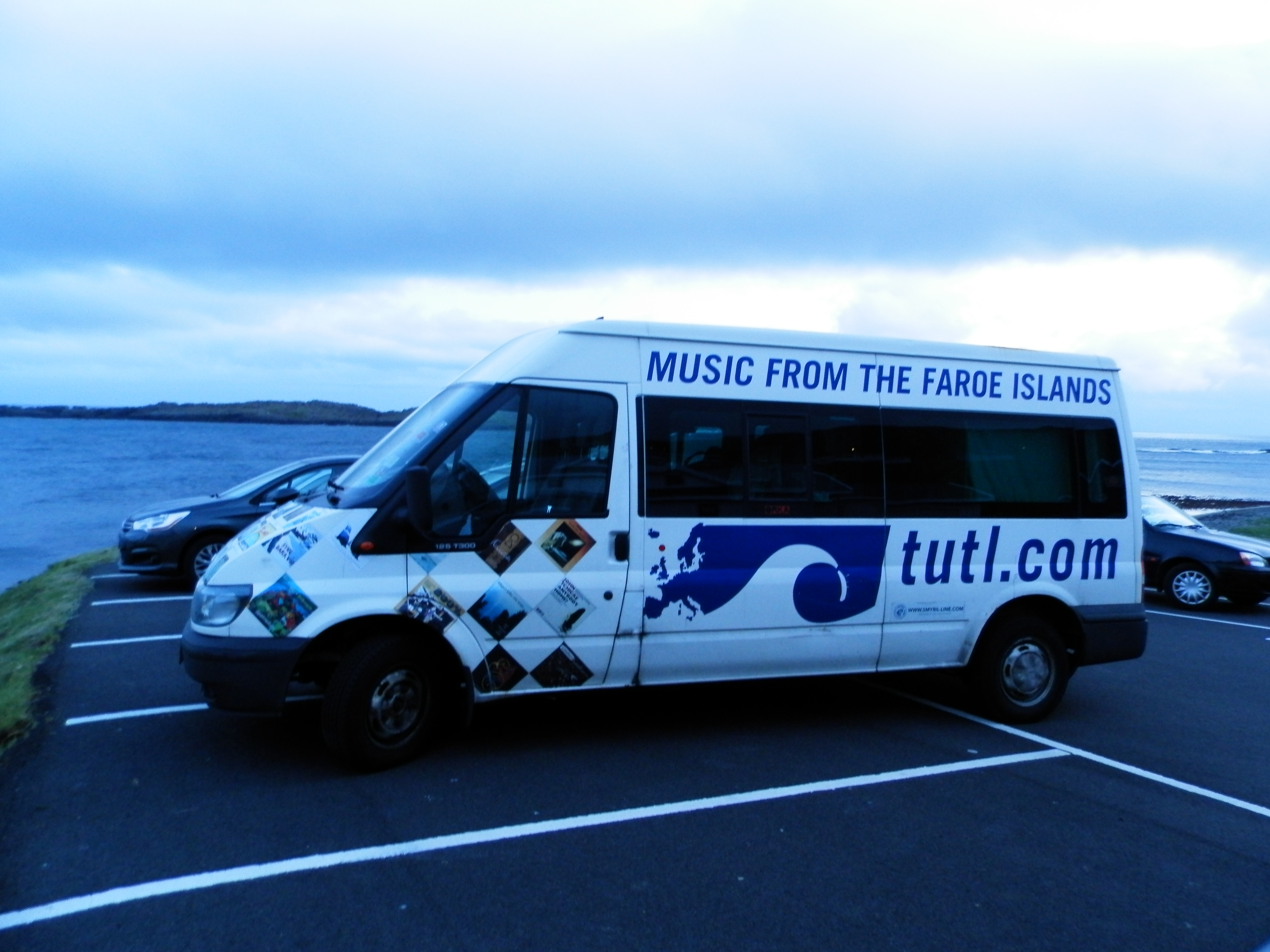
The Tutl bus in Sumba, Faroe Islands in 2013, transporting instruments for a jazz concert.

Tutl is Faroese for "whisper, susurration"; overseas, it is probably the best-known representative and distributor of Faroese music. For instance, all entries of Faroese artists in the World Music guide (published by The Rough Guide) are released by "the main Faroese record company, Tutl."

Faroese musicians such as Teitur Lassen, Eivør Pálsdóttir, Høgni Lisberg, Guðrið Hansdóttir, Knút Háberg Eysturstein and Týr started their career at Tutl, and Blak's own jazz band Yggdrasil issues all their records at Tutl.

In 2008, Tutl entered into cooperation with Factory 92 (formerly The Rocking Factory, an organization in Hamburg) that aims to represent and promote music from the Nordic countries in mainland Europe. Besides distribution, Factory 92 is also slated to help Tutl-artists organize tours.

== Honour ==
- 2024 - Export Prize of the Year at the Faroese Music Awards

== See also ==
- List of record labels
