= Heri Joensen =

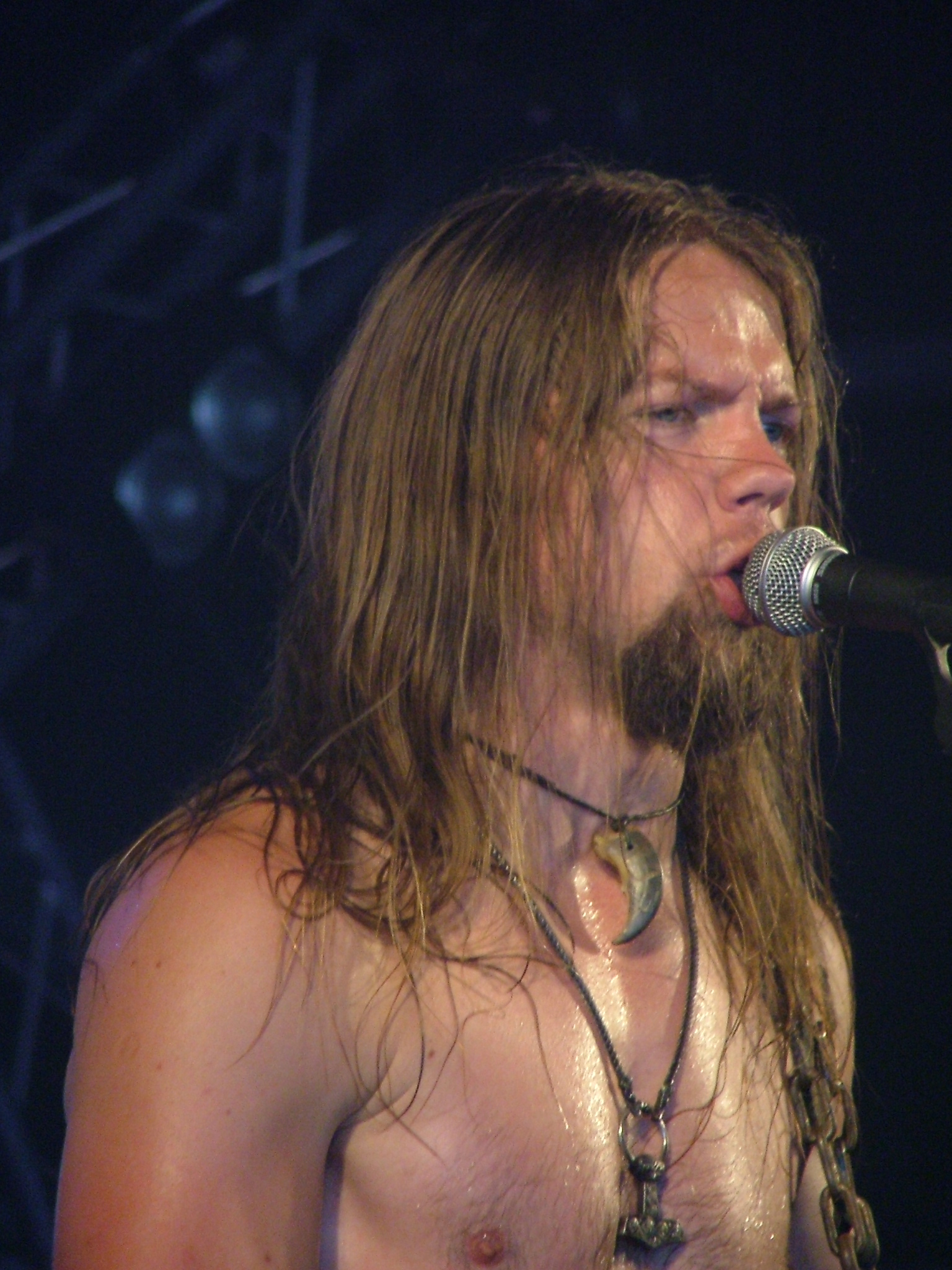
- Heri performing at the Tuska Open Air Metal Festival

Background information
- Born: 21 February 1973 (age 53); Tórshavn, Faroe Islands
- Origin: Faroe Islands
- Genres: Folk metal, Viking metal
- Occupations: Musician, singer-songwriter
- Instruments: Vocals, guitar
- Years active: 1998–present
- Member of: Týr

Heri Joensen (Faroese: [ˈheːɹɪ ˈjoːɛnˌsɛn]; born 21 February 1973) is a Faroese musician, notable for being the vocalist for the folk metal band Týr. Heri was born in the Faroe Islands capital of Tórshavn which has had an influence on his song writing. As well as Týr, he has recorded a side project titled Heljareyga.

== Early life ==
Heri Joensen was born in the Faroese capital Tórshavn on 21 February 1973, but grew up in Toftir, and later his family moved to the small village of Lamba.

At the age of fourteen Heri began playing guitar and was playing in local bands by the age of seventeen. By this time, he had relocated to the well-populated fishing port of Runavík.

Like many Faroese, Heri moved to Denmark for further education. There he met up with former bandmate Kári Streymoy and they started forming Týr. Heri initially planned to pursue a degree in Indo-European Comparative Linguistics. However, since he spent most of his time playing guitar and failing classes, he decided to switch careers and attend the music conservatory in Copenhagen: Det Alternative Rytmiske Konservatorium (D.A.R.K.). Between 2000 and 2003 he studied at D.A.R.K., majoring in Guitar, Vocals and later Music Theory.

In 2013, Heri matriculated to the University of the Faroe Islands studying the Faroese language and its literature.

Heri was raised Lutheran but became critical of Christianity and is now an atheist, although he is an admirer of pagan mythology.

== Equipment ==
Heri is known for playing a 7-string guitar, onstage he uses a unique Mahogany style guitar designed by Bjarnastein, a Faroese company.

== Other work ==
In April 2012, Joensen was involved in an online video debate with Captain Paul Watson for the Animal Planet series Whale Wars. Heri defended whaling in the Faroe Islands.

As of September 2016, Joensen was still actively engaging in the hunting of pilot whales in the Faroe Islands. Because of ongoing public conflicts with Paul Watson of Sea Shepard, Týr gigs have been canceled at various European venues.

Joensen is also known for his language skills. He speaks Faroese, Danish, Norwegian, Icelandic, English, and German.

He made a few guest appearances, including a guitar solo in Alestorm's "Barrett's Privateers" and vocals in Ensiferum's cover in the album "From afar" of the song "Vandraren", originally a Nordman song.

Joensen has made regular appearances on a discussion panel show by local radio station R7 called Tvístøða ("Dilemma") where he discusses received questions in Faroese on a panel with two others. He has also composed the jingle appearing in the beginning and between questions of Tvístøða.

Heri also had the side project 'Surma' with Czech singer Viktorie Surmová. Their first and only album, The Light Within, was released on 1 November 2020.
