= Faroese literature =

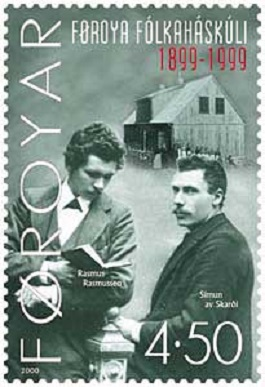
Rasmus Rasmussen and Símun av Skarði

Faroese literature (Faroese: Føroyskar bókmentir), in the traditional sense of the word, has only really developed in the past two hundred years. This is mainly because of the islands' isolation, and also because the Faroese language was not written down in a standardised format until 1890. Until then the Danish language was encouraged at the expense of Faroese. Nevertheless, the Faroese language soon became a vehicle for literature in its own right and has produced writers in several genres.

No sagas were created in the Faroe Islands, but in the 13th century the Færeyinga saga (Saga of the Faroe Islanders) was written in Iceland. It tells the story of the settlement and early history of the Faroe Islands, though it is doubtful if it is entirely historically accurate. Faroese letters survive from the 13th and 14th centuries, and Faroese ballads were collected in the 17th century.

In the Middle Ages many poems and stories were handed down orally. These works were split into the following divisions: sagnir (legends), ævintyr (stories) and kvæði (ballads, traditionally sung along with the Faroese chain dance, in modern times also used in modern Faroese music). These kvæði were eventually written down in the 19th century. They are still used in Faroese dance without any use of instruments.

One of the first Faroese writers was the early 19th century liberal Nólsoyar Páll - Poul Poulson Nólsoy, who tried to end the trading monopoly that was affecting the islands. He wrote many poems, including his most famous work Fuglakvæði. Later poets include the brothers Janus and Hans Andreas Djurhuus, and Rói Patursson.

Other famous authors from the Faroes include Heðin Brú (The Old Man and His Sons), Jørgen-Frantz Jacobsen (who wrote in Danish and is known for his sole novel Barbara) and William Heinesen (The Black Cauldron), who also wrote in Danish.

Both Heinesen and Patursson were awarded The Nordic Council's Literature Prize.

== Faroese writers and poets ==
- Bárður Oskarsson, children's writer and artist
- Bergtóra Hanusardóttir, novelist
- Carl Johan Jensen, poet and novelist
- Christian Matras, poet and translator
- Ebba Hentze, children's writer, short story writer, poet and translator
- Guðrið Helmsdal, poet
- Gunnar Hoydal, novelist, short story writer, poet and non-fiction writer
- Hanus Kamban, poet, short story writer and translator
- Hans Andrias Djurhuus, poet
- Heðin Brú, novelist and short story writer
- Høgni Mohr, novelist, translator and non-fiction writer
- Janus Djurhuus, poet
- Jens Pauli Heinesen, novelist, poet and short story writer
- Joen Danielsen, traditional poet
- Jóanes Nielsen, poet and novelist
- Jógvan Isaksen, crime fiction novelist and a non-fiction writer
- Jørgen-Frantz Jacobsen, novelist (wrote in Danish language)
- Karsten Hoydal
- Kim Simonsen
- Kristian Osvald Viderø, poet
- Marianna Debes Dahl, novelist, short story writer and children's writer
- Marjun Syderbø Kjelnæs, short story writer
- Martin Joensen, writer
- Oddfríður Marni Rasmussen, poet
- Oddvør Johansen, novelist
- Poul F. Joensen, poet and writer
- Rakel Helmsdal, short story writer and children's writer
- Rasmus Rasmussen, novelist and short story writer
- Richard B. Thomsen, novelist
- Rói Patursson, poet
- Samuel Jacob Sesanus Olsen
- Sámal Johansen
- Sigri Mitra Gaïni, poet
- Sissal Kampmann, poet
- Sólrún Michelsen, poet, novelist, short story writer, fantasy- and children´s writer
- Steinbjørn B. Jacobsen, poet, novelist and short story writer
- Tóroddur Poulsen, poet
- William Heinesen, poet, novelist and short story writer (he was Faroese but wrote in Danish language)

== Timeline of Faroese literary and cultural history ==
- 825 In Aix-la-Chapelle the Irish monk Dicuil published Liber de Mensura Orbis Terrae (or loosely translated ”The Book About the Measurement of the Earth”). Dicuil built on older sources, but added information of his own regarding, for example, the location of the Faroe Islands. According to the Faroe Saga, the Faroe Islands belonged to the crown of Norway and were converted to Christianity by Sigmund Brestirsson.
- C. 990 – The Magnus Cathedral in Kirkjebø in Streymoy was erected but never finished.
- 1298 Seyðabrævið ("The Sheep Letter"). This is the oldest remaining document regarding the Faroe Islands. After some 400 years in Denmark, the document was repatriated to the Faroe Islands. Since 1990 it has been at Føroya Landsskjalasavni (The Faroese National Archive).
- 1349–50 The Black Death.
- 1403–05 The Húsavík Letters (to be found in the Aramagnæanske Samling, printed in Diplomatarium Færoënsk I, s. 36ff).

=== Reformation era ===
- 1538 The Reformation.
- 1547–1794 Den Lærde Skole i Thorshavn (Thorshavns Latinskole). The Latin School of Thorshavn.
- 1588–1664 Ole Worm, a famous Danish medical doctor and natural scientist. He had a great interest in antiquarianism and he was the first to collect Faroese ballads. These were collected by for him by Faroese and sent to him in 1639. These are only known now in secondary sources, because of the fire in Copenhagen in 1728.
- 1593 the Icelandic Arngrímur Jónsson published a Latin text called Brevis Commentarius de Islandia, where the Faroe Islands are mentioned as “Insulæ, quæ ab ovium multitudine Færeyar, seu rectius Faareyjar, dictæ sunt...” – "here we see, that it is the number of sheep, that have given the Islands their name" (although they are spelled as “Ferøier”, “Faarø”, “Fierø“). Jónsson published another text called Crymogaea (printed in Hamburg), where he writes about the many sheep on the Faroe Islands.
- 15th century Historia Norwegiæ. It was published by P. A. Munch in 1850 under the name Symbolæ ad Historiam Antiquiorem Rerum Norwegicarum. The text was written in the 15th century, but it relies on older sources, some dating back to the 12th century. ”Historia Norwegiæ” deals with Norway and the western islands, the Orkney Islands, the Faroe Islands and Iceland.
- 1665-67 Peder Jacobsen Spjellerup was a priest in the Northern Parish of Strømoy. He wrote the first study of the Faroe Islands, though later his work was lost.
- ”Ferøers Beskrifvelser” by Thomas Tharnovius. He was born in 1644 in Rostock and his father became the priest on Suðuroy. Tharnovius studied Latin with the priest Lucas Debes. Later he studied theology at the University of Copenhagen, where he graduated in 1669. His work on the Faroe Islands is not as thorough as that of Debes (1673).
- 1592 Norriges oc omliggende Øers sandfærdige Bescriffuelser by Peder Claussøn Friis (published in 1632). In this book is an account on the Faroe Islands written by the Faroese Jacob Oudensøn.

=== 1600s onwards ===
- 1651 Jens Lauritzsøn Wolff published Norrigia Illustrata, where there are some notes on the Faroe Islands.
- 1623–76 The Danish priest Lucas Debes wrote his work on the Faroe Islands. In 1673 Lucas Debes published Færoæ & Færoa Reserata. It was later published in English (1675) and in German (1757) and a part of it was translated into Icelandic as well.
- 1695 The Icelandic-Norwegian historian and professor Th. Torfæus (also known as Þormóður Torfason 1636–1719), published his work Commentatio historica de rebus gestis Færeyensium in Copenhagen and later it was published in 1770 as Historisk Beretning om Indbyggernes Bedrifter paa Færøerne. He also wrote on the Orkney Islands in Orknøerne (1697), Grønland (1706) and Grønlands ‘vedhæng’ Vinland (1705). In 1695 Thorfæus published Leivskvæði ("The Ballad of Leif"), the first Faroese ballad to be put into print.
- 1728 Johan Hendrik Weyhe wrote a Faroese grammar which was ready for publication when it was lost the same year in the fire in Copenhagen. He also wrote a number of religious texts, Nogle vigtige Troens Articler, forestillende udi sytten Prædikkener (sic), from 1733.
- 1742–1790 Nicolai Mohr, Faroese scientist. Educated at the University of Copenhagen in economy and natural science. He did important work on Iceland: Forsøg til en islandsk Naturhistorie (1786).
- 1746–1824 J.C. Svabo, son of a priest, studied at the University of Copenhagen. He collected ballads, did topographical work and worked as a writer and as a scientist. The work Indberetninger fra en Reise i Færøe 1781 og 1782, his magnum opus, was not published as a whole before 1959.
- 1751–61 Two Faroese students wrote on Faroese matters. Gregers Møller (1727–1804), made a speech on Regensen in 1751 about Strømø: Declamatio in insulam Føroensem Strømøe. The other, Christopher Müller (1732–1804), wrote a ”dissertation” (a paper that was made the basis for a ”disputation”) in 1761. The topic was the possibility of the Faroes gaining a greater income from agriculture.
- 1756 Friedrich Christian Pelt published Der Färöische Robinson (The Faroese Robinson). The book was very poorly written and its 840 pages were published in Copenhagen and in Leipzig.
- 1766–1808 Nólsoyar Páll. Sailor and poet. In 1806 he wrote the allegorical and anti-Danish “Fuglakvæði”, the Bird Ballad.
- 1771–1851 J.H. Schrøter, Danish-Faroese priest in Suðuroy, translator and publisher. He translated the Faroe Saga to Faroese.
- 1782–1837 Hans Christian Lyngbye Danish priest, publisher and collector of Faroese ballads.
- 1794–1869 Johannes Klemmensen (known as Jóhannes í Króki), who wrote down Faroese ballads in the great collection called Sandoyarbók.
- 1787 The Stanley Expedition, a scientific enterprise. Later some of the books from this expedition were published: Wright, James: The Journals of the Stanley Expedition to the Faroe Islands and Iceland in 1789. Thorshavn, 1970.
- 1796 Lars Hess Bing published a chapter on the Faroe Islands in his great work Beskrivelse over Kongeriget Norge, Øerne Island og Færøerne samt Grønland efter ældre og nyere, trykte og haandskrevne geografiske, chorographiske, topographiske, statistiske Skrivter, Afhandlinger og Efterretninger, saavelsom ved Brevvexling og ellers erholdte Oplysninger, forfattet i alphabetisk Orden, published in Copenhagen in 1796
- 1800 the Danish priest Jørgen Landts published a work on the Faroe Islands: Forsøg til en Beskrivelse over Færøerne. Most of it is stolen from Svabo and Debes. Abouts Svabo he said, ”A student, Jens Svabo, has given some written notes on Faroe,” when he actually had taken most of his work from the unpublished works of Svabo to which he had access at the Royal Library in Copenhagen.
- 1800–06 Nólsoyar Páll wrote “Fuglakvæði”, the anti-Danish and anticolonial “Bird Ballad”. He was the first owner of a tradeship. Later he became a national hero, aided by his unexplained death at sea in 1808. He also wrote ballads like “Krákuteiti” (The Ballad of the Crowe) and "Eindadrongstáttur" (both before 1800, but the date is not known), "Jákup á Møn" (1800), "Greivin av Orient" and "Frúntatáttur" (1802–03), and "Gorpalandskvæï og Krákufrøði" (1808).
- 1807 Rasmus Rask writes a “Færøsk Sproglære”, a thesis on Faroese. He prints this in Vejledning til det Islandske eller gamle Nordiske Sprog, published in 1811.
- Jákup Nolsøe, the brother of Nólsoyar Páll, was central to creating a living social environment around the publication of Faroese antiquarian texts in the 1820s. He is mentioned and admired by Svend Grundtvig “…at da en indfødt Færing, der er ansat ved Handelen deroppe, for nogle Aar siden, kun med Forandring i Udtalen, oplæste islandske Sagaer (…) da strømmede Indbyggerne til i stor Mængde, ja kom endogsaa over fra andre Øer for at høre, og glædede sig inderlig ved at lytte til de livlige Fortællinger paa deres Modersmaal om deres Oldtidsfrænder, hvis Minde for en Deel endnu levede iblandt dem. (Grundtvig, 1845, s. 73). He wrote Færøsk Sproglære that never was published but was well known to Rasmus Rask, who later helped V.U. Hammersheimb to put together the first official Faroese orthography.
- 1795–1864 Carl Christian Rafn was Danish and a very influential publisher and translator of old texts, working together with Icelandic and Faroese language activists. It was because of him, that the “Færeyingasaga” – the Faroe Saga – was published in 1832. He worked together with Rasmus Rask in translating The Faroe Saga to Danish. Rafn also formed the very influential Oldskriftselskabet in 1825.
- P.E. Müller Danish theology professor at the University of Copenhagen, but better remembered for his work on philology and old Nordic literary history. He was the one to recognise the value the collection of ballads that H.C. Lyngbye made in the Faroe Islands in 1817. Later he wrote the introduction in the publication Færoiske Qvæder om Sigurd Fofnersbane og hans Æt (1822).
- Rasmus Rask was a world-famous Danish comparative language historian. He was interested in Icelandic from his youth and in 1816 he helped in forming the Icelandic Literary Union (Hið íslenska Bókmentafélag) and in 1818 the Library in Reykjavik (later Landsbókasafn Islands). He helped establish Literary Societies on London, Iceland and Copenhagen. His interest in Faroese inspired and helped in the creation of the written Faroese language of 1846. He helped Rafn in the translation of Faroe Saga. He was one of the leading inspirations behind the Faroese Library (Thorshavns Læsebibliothek – Later Færo Amts Bibliotek – and even later Landsbókasavnið) – helping Davidsen with many gifts of books.
- 1810 Jens Christian Djurhuus (1773–1853) (known as Sjóvarbóndin – “the farmer at Sjógv”), a farmer from Kollafjord in Streymoy wrote the modern and important ballad “Ormurin Langi”. He is also known for writing the “Púkaljómur” (The Devils Ballad), a religious epic based on English poet John Milton's “Paradise Lost”.
- From around the year 1800 we see growing attention paid to the Farose ballads collected by Svabo, Lyngbye, Schrøter, í Króki and later Hammersheimb.
- 1814 Rasmus Rask publishes the first Faroese ballad.
- 1817 H.C. Lyngbye prints the ballad “Brókatáttur” by Nólsoyar Páll in Det Skandinaviske Litteraturselskabs Skrifter.
- 1819 The Danish professor P.E. Müller gets 19 ballads sent from the Faroe Islands. He asked Peder Hentze, the priest of Sandoy, to collect ballads. Hentze gets Jóhannes í Króki to do this.
- 1822 The first Farose book is published: Færöiske Qvæder Om Sigurd Fafnersbane of hans Æt by H.C. Lyngbye in Randers, with 593 pages and an illustration of Tindholm and Dragasund. The book is dedicated to Her Royal Highness Queen Maria Sophia Frederika(?)". There is also a dedication to Anders Sørensen Vedel and Peter Syv. The book was published with a thesaurus and with some musical notes. Most of the ballads were written down by J.H. Schrøter.
- 1823 Johan Henrich Schrøter translates and publishes the Gospel of Mathew in his own orthography: Evangelium Sankta Matthæussa, aa Førisk o Dansk. Gjivi üt uppaa Prent eäv tui Danska Buibils Selskeäbinum (Randers, Elmenhoff, 1823). The book was republished in 1973, with a foreword and thesaurus by Prof. Chr. Matras.
- 1820–40 The ballad selections Fugloyarbók, Sandoyarbók and Sandvík are complete. Hammersheimb bought the Fugloyarbók, Svend Grundtvig bought the Sandoyarbók and gave it to the Royal Library. The Sandvíkar collection was lent to Jørgen Bloch.
- 1826 Thorshavns Læsebibliothek Stiftes.
- 1828 Færøernes Amts Bibliotek (National Library of the Faroe Islands).
- 1832 Nordisk Tidsskrift for Oldkyndighed / udgivet af det Kongelige Nordiske Oldskrift-Selskab.
- 1832 The publication of the Færø Saga: Færeyínga Saga eller Færøboernes Historie, i den islandske Grundtekst med færøisk og dansk oversættelse, udg. Af C.C. Rafn. Johan Henrich Schrøter translated the text to Faroese. C.C. Rafn and Rasmus Rask made the Danish translation and also changed the Faroese translation.
- 1836 Mémoires de la Société Royale des Antiquaires du Nord. In 1836 the Society began the publication of the Annaler, to contain contributions in Danish, Norwegian, Swedish or Icelandic, and the Mémoires, to contain translations of the principal works of the Society as well as occasional original contributions in French, English or German. It runs from 1836/1839-1850/1860; nouv. sér. 1866/1871-1932/1933, which would clearly cover the time period of the Aarbøger, which was the continuation of the Annaler. [Harvard Univ. cat.]
- 1840 Faroese ballands are published in Germany: Versuch einer geschichtlichen Charakteristik der Volkslider germanischer Nationen. Lpz.
- 1840. (Dahl, Erik: Tyske, franske og engelske oversættelser af færøkvæder. Festtidskrift til Matras, 1970).
- 1840 the Faroese medical doctor Napoleon Nolsøe published Qväabók um fodna Manna Roisnir frå fisti Findartui. Irt i Féreiun o goimt I Huanum ät okkara døvum. Skriva úr gomlum Bløvum äv Candidatus medicinæ & chirurgiæ N.Nolsøe. Kjeibinhavn 1840.
- 1789–1895 The Faroe Islands are the subject matter of many non-Danish travel writers and other expeditions. Primarily worth mentioning are The Stanley Expedition in 1789. It was a gentleman's expedition led by Sir John Stanley, his father being one of the richest men in England. At the age of 22, he set out to lead a scientific expedition to Iceland and the Faroe Islands (Wreight I: West, 1972).
- 1815 George Stuart Mackenzie published A Short Account of the Faroe Isles, Drawn up for the Edinburg Encyclopedia. Danish publication in 1822, med anmærkninger af bl.a. H.C. Lyngbye og Dr. Pfil. Forchhammer.
- In the 19th century, a number of tourists and other travelers came to the Faroe Islands, and out of this there came a number of publications and examples of travel writing. One such author was the German Carl Julian Graba, who visited the Faroe Islands. In 1828 he published Reise nach Färö, first published in 1848, in: Fr. Heinzelman Reisen nach Färö, Island, Sibirien, und den Nord-polarländern, vol. 2, part.1 (64 s.).
- Worth mentioning also is the account by the Frenchman Charles Frédéric Martin of a voyage to the Faroes, published under the name: Essai sur la végétation de l´archipel des Féröe, comparée à celles des Shetland et de I´Islande meridionale, In: Voyages de la commission scientifique du nord, en Scandinavie, en Laponie, au Spitzberg, et af Féröe, pendant les années 1838, 1839, et 1840 sur la corvette la Recherche, commandée par m. Fabvre, published by Paul Gaimard in 12 vol. from 1842–55.
- In 1842 the anthology Chants populaires du Nord is published, containing five Faroese ballads. They were published by Xavier Marmier, who took part in the Admiral Paul Gaimard's expedition to the Faroes.
- We could also mention George Clayton Atkinson's Journal of an Expedition to the Feroe and Westman Islands and Iceland 1833 and James Nicoll's An historical and descriptive account of Island, Greenland, and the Faroe Islands, with illustrations of their natural history. Edinburgh, 1860.
- From 1883 to 1888 we find a number of French geographical investigations, as Jules Leclercq's La terre de glace: Féroe –Islande: les geysers – le mont Hekla (Paris, 1883) and from 1888: ”L’Islande et L’archipel des Færaeer” by Dr. Henry Lebonne.
- Of other more regular travel writing, where some have a relatively high quality, it is worth mentioning Elisabeth Taylors ”The Far Islands and Other Cold Places – Travel Essays of a Victorian Lady”, she travelled in the Faroe Islands in 1895 (Taylor, 1997).
- 1844 C.C. Rafn published both “Annaler for nordisk Oldkyndighed” and Antiquarisk Tidskrift, that both publish Faroese contributions by fx Hammersheimb.
- In these publications Hammersheimb publishes ballads and articles on language.
- 1845 Povl Frederik Barfod, a true believer in Scandinavianism and a true antigerman spirit. He played a role in supporting Faroese Language and literature. He wrote two very intense articles in “Fædrelandet” in 1845. His role is more of the agitator, than the philologist. He was also active in trying to form a Faroese Literary Society. (Frederik Barfod, et livs erindringer, 1897).
- 1845 The invitation is sent out for “Indbydelse til stiftelse af et færøsk Selskab” signed by Frederik Barfod, A.P. Berggreen, FR. Hammerich, Fr. Helweg, Svend Grundtvig, V.U. Hammersheimb and the Icelandic politician and philologist Jón Sigurðson m.fl.
- 1845 N.M. Petersen, the first professor in Scandinavian languages at the University of Copenhagen, he stated that Faroese was not a real written language.
- 1846 The Faroese written language find its final form through V.U. Hammersheimb. He is helped by a great number of philologists, such as Rasmus Rask (Rasmus Rask og færøsk, 1964).
- 1846 The Danish medical doctor P.L. Panum published: ”Iagttagelser – under Mæslinge-Epidemien paa Færøerne i Aaret 1846”. With this little book the young Panum – he was 24 years old- made a name for himself in the world of medicine. In 1847 he was attached harshly by eight anonymous and hateful articles by Faroese living in Denmark.
- 1844 V.U. Hammersheimb writes the article “Det færoiske Sprog”, published in: “Kjøbenhavnerposten”, 19. dec. 1844 under the pseudonym “En færing” (A Faroese).
- 1845 Svend Grundtvig published “Dansken paa Færøerne Sidestykke til Tysken i Slesvig”
- 1845 A new law on Schools in the Faroe Islands (Skoleforordning vedr. Færøerne med skolepligt).
- 1848–51 Hammersheimb published: ”Meddelelser fra en Rejse paa Færøerne 1847–48” and a long range af other articles in “Antiquarisk Tidsskrift” (Matars, s. 53).
- 1852 The first printing facility in the Faroe Islands.
- 1852 The Faroese politician and lawyer Niels C. Winther published the first Faroese newspaper “Færingetidende” in Denmark.
- 1850 The Faroese Alexandur Weyhe publishes “Førjaríman” (Færødigtet). A National Epos written in Faroese. In 1851 he Publishes the collection of poetry: “Weihes Parnas”, where most of the poems are Danish and French.
- 1854 A Faroese Grammar is published by V.U. Hammersheimb.
- 1866 Aarbøger for Nordisk Oldkyndighed og Historie / Annual of the Royal Society of Northern Antiquaries / Det kongelige Nordiske Oldskriftselskab.
- 1856 The Royal Trade Monopoly is abolished.
- 1861 The upper secondary school in the Faroe Islands, Realskúlin.
- 1865 H.N. Jacobsen bookstore opens in Tórshavn.
- 1870 The Faroese Teachers School (Føroya Læraraskúli).
- 1878 Dimmalætting. Amtstidende for Færøerne. (Newspaper)
- 1876 The rise og national poems and songs used in the student hall Regensen in Copenhagen. These were later collected and published in “Føriskar vysur irktar og sungnar äv føringun í Kjøpinhavn (1876–92).
- 1881 Føroyingafelag í Keypmannahavn. The Faroese Union in Copenhagen is founded.
- 1888 The Christmas Meeting in Tórshavn.
- 1886–1891 Hammersheimb puts together “Færøsk Antologi”, (the Anthology of the Faroese) by request by the literary society: “Samfund til udgivelse af gammel nordisk litteratur”. He is helped by stud.mag. Jakob Jacobsen.
- 1889 Føroyingafelag í Føroyum. The Faroese Union of the Faroe Islands.
- 1889 Rasmus Christofer Effersøe wrote the historical play “Gunnar Havreki. Syrgileikur í 3. pørtum”. “Magnus” from 1892. “Best man vera sum er”, 1895.
- 1889 Helena Patursson wrote the play “Veðurføst”.
- 1890 Effersøe wrote “Hjá Dalabóndum” (inspired by Hostrup “En nat mellem Fjeldene”., performed in Tórshavn in 1890.
- 1898 Fuglframi. A cultural Faroese publication published in the Faroes.
- 1890 Føroya Bókafelag – The Faroese Book Society. Føroyingatíðindi. The first Faroese nationally oriented newspaper.
- 1899 Føroyski Fólkaháskúlin. The Faroese Højskole is founded with inspiration from Denmark – vallekilde and Askov Højskole – by Rasmus Rasmussen and Símun av Skarði.
- 1900 The first Faroese School book. The “Bíbliusøga” by Joen Poulsen. Later he spent his life as a politician for the Sambandsflokkurin.
- 1901–90 Tingakrossur – the independent and, at times cultural radical, newspaper.
- 1902 Búreisingur. An important Faroese national media and magazine published in the Faroe Islands by A.C. Evensen.
- 1906 A.C. Evensen published “Føroysk lesibók fyri eldri born” (A Textbook on Faroese for older children).
- 1907 A Textbook for younger children.
- 1907 Spelling Book.
- 1911 Lesibók (A Textbook and Anthology).
- 1905–08 Oyggjarnar. The first (and only) Faroese newspaper for women.
- 1907–12 Føroyska Bókmentafelagið. The Faroese Literary Society.
- 1909 Babelstornið (The Tower of Babel) the first Faroese novel by Regin í Líð (Rasmus Rasmussen)
- 1912 First volume of short stories “Glámlýsi” by Rasmus Rasmussen.
- 1914 J.H.O. Djurhuus published his “Yrkingar”. Said to be the first Faroese vol. of poetry.
  - First Faroese children book – Robinson Kruso – translated by Sverre Patursson.
- 1915 Norðlýsi. Newspaper for the Northern Islands based in Klaksvík.
- Føroya-tíðindi. Newspaper based in Tvøroyri in Suðuroy.
- 1916 Virkið. Faroese Workers Union published its newspaper.
- 1920 F.F. Blað Føroya Fiskimanna. Faroese Fishers Unions Newspaper.
- 1921 Varðin. A literary publication is published.
- 1928 The Faroese-Danish Dictionary. Published by Christian Matras.
- 2007 First ever Faroese/German anthology “From Janus Djurhuus to Tóroddur Poulsen – Faroese Poetry during 100 Years”. Edited by Paul Alfred Kleinert, academic advice: Turið Sigurðardóttir, lineartranslation: Inga Meincke.

== See also ==
- Art of the Faroe Islands
- Music of the Faroe Islands
- Faroese Cultural Prize
- Faroese Literature Prize
- List of novels written in Faroese
