= List of novels written in Faroese =

List of novels for adults, which were written in Faroese. The written form of the Faroese language is rather recent. The spelling rules, as devised by V.U. Hammershaimb, have been in use since the mid-19th century, but no novels were written in Faroese until the early 20th century. The first novel in Faroese was Bábelstornið by Regin í Líð, published in 1909. The well-known Faroese writers William Heinesen and Jørgen-Frantz Jacobsen wrote their novels in Danish, and therefore their novels are not on this list. They are considered, however, to be an important part of the Faroese literature, leaving linguistic considerations aside. Below is a list of Faroese novels which were written in Faroese and were published over a period of 100 years from 1909 to 2012. ("Skaldsøga" is the Faroese word for novel.)

- 1909 - Bábelstornið / Regin í Líð. - Tórshavn : Hitt føroyska bókmentafelagið – 262 pages
- 1927 - Aðru ferð : ein framtíðarmynd / Victor Danielsen. - Tórshavn : V. Danielsen – 62 pages
- 1927 - Beinta / H. A. Djurhuus. - Tórshavn : [s.n.] – 157 pages
- 1930 - Lognbrá / Heðin Brú. - Tórshavn : Varðin og Merkið – 151 pages
- 1935 - Fastatøkur / Heðin Brú. - Tórshavn : Varðin – 205 pages
- 1940 - Feðgar á ferð / Heðin Brú. - Tórshavn : Varðin – 159 pages
- 1946 - Fiskimenn / Martin Joensen. - Tórshavn : Norrøna forlagið – 322 pages
- 1947 - Nei - lyftið sveik ikki / Victor Danielsen. - Tórshavn : Norrøna forlagið – 102 pages
- 1952 - Hitt ævinliga gonguverkið / H.M. Eidesgaard. - Tórshavn : Eysturlund – 152 pages
- 1952 - Tað lýsir á landi / Martin Joensen. - Tórshavn : Varðin – 344 pages
- 1958 - Yrkjarin úr Selvík og vinir hansara / Jens Pauli Heinesen. - Tórshavn : J.P. Heinesen – 210 pages
- 1962 - Tú upphavsins heimur / Jens Pauli Heinesen. - Tórshavn : J.P. Heinesen, 1962–1966, 3 volumes – 409 pages
- 1963 - Leikum fagurt ... / Heðin Brú. - Tórshavn : H. Brú – 195 pages
- 1968 - Nógv ímillum : kristilig skaldsøga / Hans J. Ellingsgaard. - Tórshavn : Kirkjuliga Missiónsfelagið – 85 pages
- 1970 - Men lívið lær : skaldsøga / Heðin Brú. - Tórshavn : Varðin – 321 pages
- 1971 - Rannvá / Dagmar Joensen-Næs. - Tórshavn : D. Joensen-Næs – 114 pages
- 1972 - Tað stóra takið / Heðin Brú. - Tórshavn : Emil Thomsen – 251 pages
- 1973 - Frænir eitur ormurin : skaldsøga / Jens Pauli Heinesen. - Tórshavn : J.P. Heinesen – 466 pages
- 1977 - Rekamaðurin / Jens Pauli Heinesen. - Tórshavn : Gestur – 117 pages
- 1977 - Skitsur : býurin og stórbýurin / Magnus Dam Jacobsen. - Bagsværd : M.D. Jacobsen – 164 pages
- 1978 - Osvald : skaldsøga / Valdemar Poulsen. - Tórshavn : Bókagarður, Emil Thomsen – 269 pages
- 1978 - Abbastova : skaldsøga / Louis Zachariasen. - Tórshavn : Bókagarður, Emil Thomsen – 169 pages
- 1979 - Tey telgja sær gudar : skaldsøga / Jens Pauli Heinesen. - Tórshavn : Gestur – 133 pages
- 1979 - Seinnapartur / Carl Johan Jensen. - Tórshavn : C.J. Jensen – 59 pages
- 1980 - Nú ert tú mansbarn á foldum : skaldsøga / Jens Pauli Heinesen. - Tórshavn : Gestur – 162 pages
- 1981 - Lýsir nú fyri tær heimurin : skaldsøga / Jens Pauli Heinesen. - Tórshavn : Gestur – 126 pages
- 1982 - Leikur tín er sum hin ljósi dagur : skaldsøga / Jens Pauli Heinesen. - Tórshavn : Gestur – 167 pages
- 1982 - Lívsins summar / Oddvør Johansen. - Tórshavn : Orð og Løg – 175 pages
- 1983 - Markleys breiðist nú fyri tær fold : skaldsøga / Jens Pauli Heinesen. - Tórshavn : Gestur – 192 pages
- 1984 - Lokkalogi : skaldsøga / Marianna Debes Dahl. - Tórshavn : Fannir – 160 pages
- 1984 - Eitt dýpi av dýrari tíð : skaldsøga / Jens Pauli Heinesen. - Tórshavn : Gestur – 131 pages
- 1984 - Hall : skaldsøga / Steinbjørn B. Jacobsen. - Tórshavn : S. Jacobsen – 134 pages
- 1986 - Onglalag : skaldsøga / Marianna Debes Dahl. - Tórshavn : Fannir – 130 pages
- 1987 - Tað heita summarið : skaldsøga / Høgni av Heiði. - Copenhagen : Mentunargrunnur studentafelagsins – 136 pages
- 1987 - Deyðin sendir apríl / Einar Petersen. - Sørvágur : Scorpio – 93 pages
- 1988 - Faldalín : skaldsøga / Marianna Debes Dahl. - Tórshavn : Fannir – 196 pages
- 1988 - Dælt er manni vitandi orð / Óli Dahl. - Tórshavn : Fannir – 119 pages
- 1988 - Í andgletti : skaldsøga / Jens Pauli Heinesen. - Tórshavn : Gestur – 167 pages
- 1988 - Handan fyri havið - býurin og bygdin / Magnus Dam Jacobsen. - Tórshavn : Exlibris – 141 pages
- 1990 - ... hvørt við sínar náðir : ein skaldsøga / D. P. Danielsen. - Tórshavn : Fannir – 246 pages
- 1990 - Skert flog / Bergtóra Hanusardóttir. - Copenhagen : Mentunargrunnur studentafelagsins – 147 pages
- 1990 - Blíð er summarnátt á Føroyalandi / Jógvan Isaksen. - Copenhagen : Mentunargrunnur studentafelagsins – 263 pages
- 1990 - Tvey : skaldsøga / Martin Næs. - Tórshavn : Fannir – 106 pages
- 1990 - Á Suðurlandið / Kristian Osvald Viderø. - Tórshavn : Bókagarður, Emil Thomsen – 252 pages
- 1991 - Undir suðurstjørnum : skaldsøga / Gunnar Hoydal. - Kollafjørður : Árting – 265 pages
- 1991 - Kasta : skaldsøga / Steinbjørn B. Jacobsen. - Tórshavn : S. Jacobsen – 116 pages
- 1991 - Gummistivlarnir eru tær einastu tempulsúlurnar, sum vit eiga í Føroyum / Jóanes Nielsen. - Copenhagen : Mentunargrunnur studentafelagsins – 126 pages
- 1992 - Vívil : skaldsøga / Marianna Debes Dahl. - Tórshavn : Fannir – 150 pages
- 1992 - Bláfelli : skaldsøga / Jens Pauli Heinesen. - Tórshavn : Gestur – 246 pages
- 1993 - Ein mamma er ein mamma : skaldsøga / Oddvør Johansen. - Copenhagen : Mentunargrunnur studentafelagsins – 170 pages
- 1994 - Við bivandi hjarta : skaldsøga / Høgni av Heiði. - Copenhagen : Mentunargrunnur studentafelagsins – 127 pages
- 1994 - Reglur : eitt brotsverk / Tóroddur Poulsen. - Tórshavn : Fannir – 132 pages
- 1994 - Gráur oktober / Jógvan Isaksen. - Copenhagen : Mentunargrunnur studentafelagsins – 243 pages
- 1995 - Eitt slag av tíð / Ólavur í Beiti. - Sørvágur : Grønhólmur – 247 pages
- 1995 - Rúm : ein tekstur í fjúrtan pørtum / Carl Jóhan Jensen. - Copenhagen : Mentunargrunnur studentafelagsins – 283 pages
- 1995 - Tá ið tú kemur / Ólavur í Beiti. - Sørvágur : Grønhólmur – 208 pages
- 1996 - Á ólavsøku : summarkrimi í 9 pørtum / Jógvan Isaksen. - Nivå : Antonia – 86 pages - ISBN 99918-43-11-6
- 1996 - Duldar leiðir / Mina Reinert. - Copenhagen : Mentunargrunnur studentafelagsins – 223 pages
- 1997 - Sót og søgn / Tóroddur Poulsen. - Tórshavn : Fannir – 144 pages, ISBN 99918-49-12-2
- 1997 - Myrkar nætur / Sonni Jacobsen. - Sørvágur : Ytstifjórðingur – 185 pages, ISBN 99918-934-3-1
- 1997 - Páskaódnin / Jóanes Nielsen. - Copenhagen : Mentunargrunnur studentafelagsins – 176 pages, ISBN 99918-43-14-0
- 1998 - Teir bláu / Sonni Jacobsen. - Sørvágur : Ytstifjórðingur – 245 pages, ISBN 99918-934-4-X
- 1998 - Í morgin er aftur ein dagur / Oddvør Johansen. - Copenhagen : Mentunargrunnur studentafelagsins – 224 pages, ISBN 99918-43-18-3
- 1999 - Vónbrot : skaldsøga / Oluf Djurhuus. - Innan Glyvur : O. Djurhuus – 122 pages, ISBN 99918-3-068-5
- 1999 - Suðar dýpið reyða / Bergtóra Hanusardóttir. - Copenhagen : Mentunargrunnur studentafelagsins – 184 pages, ISBN 99918-43-24-8
- 1999 - Ein ódeyðilig sál - og aðrar / Jens Pauli Heinesen. - Copenhagen : Mentunargrunnur studentafelagsins – 297 pages, ISBN 99918-43-20-5
- 1999 - Dalurin fagri : skaldsøga / Gunnar Hoydal. - Tórshavn : Føroya lærarafelag – 309 pages
- 1999 - Úr támi tíðarinnar / Sonni Jacobsen. - Sørvágur : Ytstifjórðingur – 191 pages, ISBN 99918-934-5-8
- 1999 - Tey, ið undan fóru : skaldsøga / Oluf Djurhuus. - Innan Glyvur : O. Djurhuus – 155 pages, ISBN 99918-3-087-1
- 2000 - Koparskrínið / Jens Pauli Heinesen. - Copenhagen : Mentunargrunnur studentafelagsins – 120 pages, ISBN 99918-43-30-2
- 2000 - Hjá dvørgum í Niðafjøllum : ævintýrsøga / Annfinnur í Skála. - Tórshavn : Sprotin – 264 pages, Series: Heimurin forni 1, ISBN 99918-44-45-7
- 2000 - Ferðin til Zambora : ævintýrsøga / Annfinnur í Skála. - Tórshavn : Sprotin – 267 pages. Series: Heimurin forni 2, ISBN 99918-44-46-5
- 2001 - Tá ið eg havi málað summarhúsið : skaldsøga / Oddvør Johansen. - Copenhagen : Mentunargrunnur studentafelagsins – 116 pages, ISBN 99918-43-34-5
- 2001 - Gutthús : skaldsøga / Oluf Djurhuus. - Innan Glyvur : O. Djurhuus – 137 pages, ISBN 99918-963-0-9
- 2002 - Bygdarmenning : skaldsøga / Andras Miðskarð. - Klaksvík : A. Miðskarð – 215 pages, ISBN 99918-3-119-3
- 2003 - Eitrandi blóð / Sonni Jacobsen. - Sørvágur : Ytstifjórðingur – 188 pages, ISBN 99918-934-7-4
- 2004 - Hjálpt úr neyð : skaldsøga / Absalon Absalonsen. - Tórshavn : Løkur lítli – 229 pages, ISBN 99918-994-1-3
- 2004 - Hvør var Nimrod? / Jens Pauli Heinesen. - Copenhagen : Mentunargrunnur studentafelagsins – 178 pages, ISBN 99918-43-52-3 (print errors in book: 99918-46-52-3)
- 2004 - Sebastians hús : skaldsøga / Oddvør Johansen. - Copenhagen : Mentunargrunnur studentafelagsins – 128 pages, ISBN 99918-43-48-5
- 2004 - Meðan sólin í eystri roðar : skaldsøga / Jóannes Kjølbro. - [S.l.] : J. Kjølbro – 175 pages, ISBN 99918-3-158-4
- 2004 - der græder så mangen / Kári Petersen. - Tórshavn : K. Petersen – 198 pages, ISBN 99918-3-170-3
- 2005 - Sornhúsfólkini : skaldsøga / Absalon Absalonsen; perma og myndir: Absalon Absalonsen. - Tórshavn : Løkur lítli – 244 pages, ISBN 99918-994-2-1
- 2005 - Messias II ella Synd drepur Guð : ein leysasøga / Elias Askham. - Copenhagen : Mentunargrunnur studentafelagsins – 356 pages, ISBN 99918-43-61-2
- 2005 - Mørk / Vida Akselsdóttir Højgaard. - Copenhagen : Mentunargrunnur studentafelagsins – 180 pages, ISBN 99918-43-59-0
- 2005 - Krossmessa / Jógvan Isaksen. - Copenhagen : Mentunargrunnur studentafelagsins – 289 pages, ISBN 99918-43-62-0
- 2005 - Ó- : søgur um djevulskap / Carl Jóhan Jensen. - Vestmanna : Sprotin – 786 pages, ISBN 99918-44-74-0
- 2005 - Hvirlan / Dagny Joensen. - Copenhagen : Mentunargrunnur studentafelagsins – 174 pages
- 2005 - Glansbílætasamlararnir : skaldsøga / Jóanes Nielsen. - Copenhagen : Mentunargrunnur studentafelagsins – 276 pages, ISBN 99918-43-57-4
- 2006 - Burtur : skaldsøga / Bergtóra Hanusardóttir. - Copenhagen : Mentunargrunnur studentafelagsins – 418 pages, ISBN 99918-43-70-1
- 2006 - Í havsins hjarta : skaldsøga / Gunnar Hoydal. - Vestmanna : Sprotin – 517 pages, ISBN 9789991844879
- 2007 - Adventus Domini / Jógvan Isaksen. - Copenhagen : Mentunargrunnur studentafelagsins – 253 pages, ISBN 9789991843773
- 2007 - Tema við slankum / Sólrún Michelsen. - Copenhagen : Mentunargrunnur studentafelagsins – 118 pages, ISBN 9789991843766
- 2008 - Útvølir / Tóroddur Poulsen. - Copenhagen : Mentunargrunnur studentafelagsins – 185 pages, ISBN 9789991843827
- 2008 - Metusalem / Jógvan Isaksen. - Copenhagen : Mentunargrunnur studentafelagsins – 316 pages, ISBN 9789991843803
- 2009 - Norðlýsið / Jógvan Isaksen. - Copenhagen : Mentunargrunnur studentafelagsins – 290 pages
- 2010 - Dirvi til at liva / David Johannesen. - Miðvágur : Vón - 135 pages
- 2010 - Norska Løva / Jógvan Isaksen. - Copenhagen : Mentunargrunnur studentafelagsins – 268 pages, ISBN 9789991843926
- 2011 - Deydningar dansa á sandi / Jógvan Isaksen. - Copenhagen : Mentunargrunnur studentafelagsins – 372 pages, ISBN 9789991843988
- 2011 - Brahmadellarnir / Jóanes Nielsen. - Copenhagen : Mentunargrunnur studentafelagsind – 364 pages, ISBN 9789991843957
- 2011 - Tey bæði : trúfesti og fullkomin friður / Dirk Diggler. - Tórshavn : DD – 172 pages, ISBN 9789991833392
- 2011 - Vitjan... : framtíðarskaldsøga / Annfinnur í Skála. - Vestmanna : Sprotin – 310 pages, ISBN 9789991871677
- 2012 - Tann fimti maðurin / Jógvan Isaksen. - Copenhagen : Amaldus [i.e. Mentunargrunnur studentafelagsins – 287 pages, ISBN 9789991875033
- 2012 - Skugganna land / Annfinnur í Skála. - Vestmanna : Sprotin – 553 pages, ISBN 978-99918-71-55-4
- 2013 - Hinumegin er mars / Sólrún Michelsen. - Copenhagen : Mentunargrunnur studentafelagsins – 144 pages, ISBN 978-99918-75-05-7
