= Barnamentanarheiðursløn Tórshavnar býráðs =

Barnamentanarheiðursløn Tórshavnar býráðs (transl. Children's Cultural Prize of Tórshavn City Council) is a Faroese cultural prize, which is given by the City Council of Tórshavn to a Faroese writer, artist, musician, orchestra etc. who the board wish to award for their artistic work with children. The prize was earlier called Barnabókaheiðursløn Tórshavnar býráðs, but in 2010 the rules were changed and the title of the award was changed; the word bók (book) was changed to mentan (culture) in order not to exclude people who are not writers, but still have done a great cultural work for Faroese children.

== List of recipients ==
These persons and companies have received the award Barnamentanarheiðursløn Tórshavnar býráðs since it started in 1976:

- 1976 Steinbjørn B. Jacobsen
- 1977 Sigurð Joensen for his books Gráa dunna, Kálvamuan, Lambamæið
- 1978 Marianna Debes Dahl for her book Burtur á heiði
- 1979 Andreas Andreasen
- 1979 Óli Dahl
- 1980 Heðin Brú
- 1981 Martin Næs og Martin Joensen
- 1982 Christian Høj
- 1982 Petur Andreassen
- 1983 Alexandur Kristiansen
- 1983 Guðrun Gaard
- 1984 William Heinesen
- 1984 Elin Súsanna Jacobsen
- 1984 Ebba Hentze
- 1985 Steinbjørn B. Jacobsen
- 1985 Marius Johannesen
- 1986 Nýlendi (publishing company)
- 1986 Dropin (publishing company)
- 1987 Pauli Nielsen
- 1988 Oddvør Johansen
- 1989 Jákup Berg
- 1989 Óli Petersen
- 1990 Elin Mortensen
- 1990 Olivur við Neyst
- 1991 Bjørg Matras Jensen
- 1992 No prize given
- 1993 Dansifelagið í Havn (Faroese Chain Dance Association in Tórshavn) with Sonja Danielsen og Tórhild Justinussen
- 1993 Jóhannus á Rógvu Joensen
- 1994 Niels Jákup Thomsen
- 1994 Ella Smith Clementsen
- 1995 Edward Fuglø
- 1996 Rakel Helmsdal for her book Tey kalla meg bara Hugo.
- 1997 Gríma (Faroese Theatre Group)
- 1998 Knút Olsen
- 1998 Lydia Didriksen
- 1999 Eli Smith
- 2000 Effie Campbell
- 2001 Maud Heinesen for her books for children
- 2002 Sólrún Michelsen
- 2003 Alexandur Kristiansen
- 2004 No prize given
- 2005 Grafik Studio with Ingi Joensen
- 2005 Theodor Hansen
- 2006 Steintór Rasmussen
- 2007 Bárður Oskarsson
- 2008 Hanni Bjartalíð
- 2008 Marjun Syderbø Kjelnæs
- 2009 Búi Dam
- 2009 Dánjal á Neystabø
- 2010 Janus á Húsagarði for his books Mosamolis and Mosalisa.
- 2010 Jensina Olsen for her musical and theatrical work with and for children.
- 2011 Føroya Symfoniorkestur
- 2012 Hjørdis Johansen, for her theatrical work with children in Dramaverkstaðið in Tórshavn.
- 2013 Hilmar Joensen
- 2013 Rakel Helmsdal
- 2014 Elin á Rógvi
- 2015 No prize given
- 2016 Beinta Johannesen for her work making interesting material for children at the publishing house Bókadeild Føroya Lærarafelags
- 2016 Joan Sørinardóttir for her book Hvannpoppkorn og summardáafruktsalat
- 2017 Hjálmar Dam and Hanna Flóvinsdóttir
- 2018 Vár Berghamar Jacobsen
- 2019 Bergur Rasmussen
- 2020 Marjun Syderbø Kjelnæs and Rakel Helmsdal

== See also ==
- Faroese Literature Prize
- Faroese Cultural Prize
