= Ebba Hentze =

Faroese writer of children's books, poet and translator

Ebba Hentze (25 September 1930 – 20 May 2015) was a Faroese writer of children's books and a poet and translator.

She received three Faroese literature and cultural prizes: Barnamentanarheiðursløn Tórshavnar býráðs (Tórshavn City Council's Children's Books Prize) in 1984, Faroese Literature Prize (Mentanarvirðisløn M. A. Jacobsens) in 2006 and Faroese Cultural Prize (Mentanarvirðisløn Landsins) in 2008, together with grants from Denmark and Sweden. Some of her books were written in Danish and some in Faroese. She was most active as a translator, having rendered around a hundred books into Danish from English, German, Faroese, Swedish and Norwegian.

== Biography ==
Ebba Hentze was an adopted child and grew up in Tvøroyri. Her parents were Peter Christian Pauli Hentze (1891–1971) and Olivia Sophie Skaalum (1888–1976) from Hvalba. As a young girl she moved to Denmark to study. She graduated from High School at the Statens Kursus in Copenhagen in 1950 and then studied literature and linguistics at the University of Copenhagen. In the 1950s she obtained scholarships enabling her to study at the universities in Uppsala, Sweden, in Vienna, Rome and in the Sorbonne.

She worked as a publishing consultant for Politiken and Gyldendal and on a freelance basis for Danish, Swedish and Faroese radio. She moved back to the Faroe Islands in the late 1970s and played an important role among writers and other intellectuals in Tórshavn. She was a member of the Faroese committee, which nominates Faroese books to the Nordic Council's Literature Prize. She was an honorary member of the Faroese Writer's Association (Rithøvundafelag Føroya).

Hentze published a few poems in the Danish literature magazine Hvedkorn. These poems were her debut as a writer. She wrote several short stories in Danish which were published in Politikens Magasin. In 1985 she published an important contribute to Faroese women's literature with her prose poem Kata, ein seinkaður nekrologur (Kata, a delayed obituary). The poem tells about a woman who gives up her dreams to get an education, because she must take care of her younger siblings after their mother's death. Ebba Hentze made a great effort to make Faroese literature known outside the Faroe Islands, first of all by translating Faroese novels and poems by various writers and poets to Danish and by her efforts to find publishing houses who wished to publish the books. She translated several of Jóanes Nielsen's novels and poetry collections. She also translated Rói Patursson's poetry collection Líkasum (1985), which won The Nordic Council's Literature Prize.

== Selected works ==
=== Children's books ===
- Antonia og Morgenstjernen, 1981
- Antonia midt i det hele, 1982 - (Both books about Antonia are in Danish and were later translated into Faroese. They were also broadcast on radio stations in the Faroe Islands, Sweden, Norway, Finland and Iceland. The books were also published in the Netherlands and in Belgium.)
- Bjørns søn, 1983, written in Danish, later translated into Faroese with the title Mamman eigur meg. The story takes place in the village of Hvalba, where Ebba's mother came from.
- Mia, skúlagenta í Havn, 1987, children's book, written in Faroese
- Gulleygað, 1992, children's book, written in Faroese

=== Short stories ===
- Juli, 1986, in Brá (Faroese literature magazine)

=== Poems ===
- Kata, ein seinkaður nekrologur, 1984 in Brá number 5 She also published in a school book for 14- to 16-year-old pupils: Les 2.

=== Faroese books translated to Danish by Ebba Hentze ===
- Bølgerne leger på stranden (Jens Pauli Heinesen), Gyldendal, 1980.
- Livets Sommer (roman efter Oddvør Johansen), Forlaget Vindrose, 1982.
- Med Edgar Allan Poe i Solhavn. Husets Forlag, 1984. 12 chosen short stories by Hanus Andreassen (who now is called Hanus Kamban)
- Ligesom, 1986, (collection of poems by Rói Patursson, who won The Nordic Council's Literature Prize). Original title: Líkasum
- Saltet i dampende middagsgryder, 1988 (poems by Jóanes Nielsen), Vindrose. Hentze chose the poems from his earliest collection of poetry, and translated them to Danish for this poetry collection.
- Færøhesten, 1990 (illustrated children's book by Ólavur Michelsen)
- Gummistøvler er de eneste tempelsøjler vi ejer på Færøerne, 1992 (novel by Jóanes Nielsen) Original title: Gummistivlarnir eru tær einastu tempulsúlurnar sum vit eiga í Føroyum
- Kirkerne på havets bund, 1994, (poems by Jóanes Nielsen). Original title: Kirkjurnar á havsins botni
- Grå oktober, 1995 (crime fiction by Jógvan Isaksen) Original title: Gráur oktober (Gray October)
- Sting, 1998, (poems by Jóanes Nielsen). Original title: Pentur
- I morgen er der atter en dag (novel by Oddvør Johansen) - it was nominated for The Nordic Council's Literature Prize, first in 2000, but was postponed to 2001. The book has not yet been published in Danish.
- Blodprøver, 2003 (poems by Tóroddur Poulsen)
- Hedder noget land weekend?, 2005 (play by Jóanes Nielsen)

== Honours ==
- Statens Kunstfond
- Barnamentanarheiðursløn Tórshavnar býráðs in 1984
- Drassows Legat i 1992
- Mentanarvirðisløn Landsins Extraordinary cultural prize in 2001
- Lachmannska Priset i 2002
- Faroese Literature Prize (Mentanarvirðisløn M. A. Jacobsens) in 2006
- Faroese Cultural Prize in 2008
- Sømdargáva landsins 2012 (Faroese grant, DKK 20.000 will be given annually for the rest of her life. The grant was handed on 15 January 2013)
