= Association of Writers of the Faroe Islands =

Association of Writers of the Faroe Islands (in Faroese called Rithøvundafelag Føroya) is an association for authors and translators who write in the Faroese language. These authors live primarily in the Faroe Islands, but some of them also live in other countries. Some Faroese writers write not only in Faroese but also in Danish, but most Faroese writers write primarily in Faroese. The Faroese language is only spoken by the Faroese people of the Faroe Islands, which currently have a population of 50.000 people. The Association of Writers of the Faroe Islands was established in 1957.

== Presidents ==
- Rakel Helmsdal 2023 -
- Oddfríður Marni Rasmussen 2022–2023
- Vónbjørt Vang 2015 - 2022
- Ludvík á Brekku 2015
- Sámal Soll 2014–2015
- Helle Thede Johansen 2012—2014
- Malan Poulsen 2011–2012
- Rakel Helmsdal 2009–2011
- Arnbjørn Ó. Dalsgarð 2007–2009
- Heðin M. Klein 2006–2007
- Carl Jóhan Jensen 2004–2006
- Gunnar Hoydal 1998–2004
- Lydia Didriksen 1997–1998
- Heðin M. Klein 1994–1997
- Hanus Kamban 1992–1994
- Carl Jóhan Jensen 1991–1992
- Turið Sigurðardóttir 1989–1991
- Martin Næs 1986–1989
- Gunnar Hoydal 1981–1986
- Marianna Debes Dahl 1980–1981
- Karsten Hoydal 1976–1980
- Jákup í Jákupsstovu 1973–1976
- Jens Pauli Heinesen 1970–1973
- Ólavur Michelsen 1968–1970
- Valdemar Poulsen 1967–1968
- Martin Joensen 1957–1959
