= Faroese Cultural Prize =

Mentanarvirðisløn Landsins
- Description: Excellence in Faroese culture (literature, music, arts, etc.)
- Country: Faroe Islands
- Presented by: Ministry of Culture
- First award: 1998

Mentanarvirðisløn Landsins (Faroese Cultural Prize) has been awarded by the Faroese government to Faroese writers, musicians, artists etc. since 1998. In 2004 no award was given. From 1998 to 2000 only one award was given, but in 2001 they established an additional award, half as big as the original.

The prize is awarded by a board appointed by the Ministry of Culture. The board also gives additional special awards of 50.000 Danish Koroner and/or so-called sømdargávur or Sømdargáva landsins (grants), given as a lifelong annual grant of DKK 20 000. The main award, Mentanarvirðisløn landsins, is DKK 150.000, and the heiðursgáva landsins (award of honour) is DKK 75.000 koroner.

In 2011 the awards were announced in December, with the next awards announced on 15 January 2013, which was William Heinesen's birthday. This was also the first time that the event was held in Klaksvík, being announced in Spaniastova and broadcast live on national Faroese radio. The following year the prizes were handed out on 15 January in Stóra Pakkhús (The Large Storage House) in Vágur.

== Awarded cultural persons ==
=== Mentanarvirðisløn landsins – Faroese Cultural Prize ===
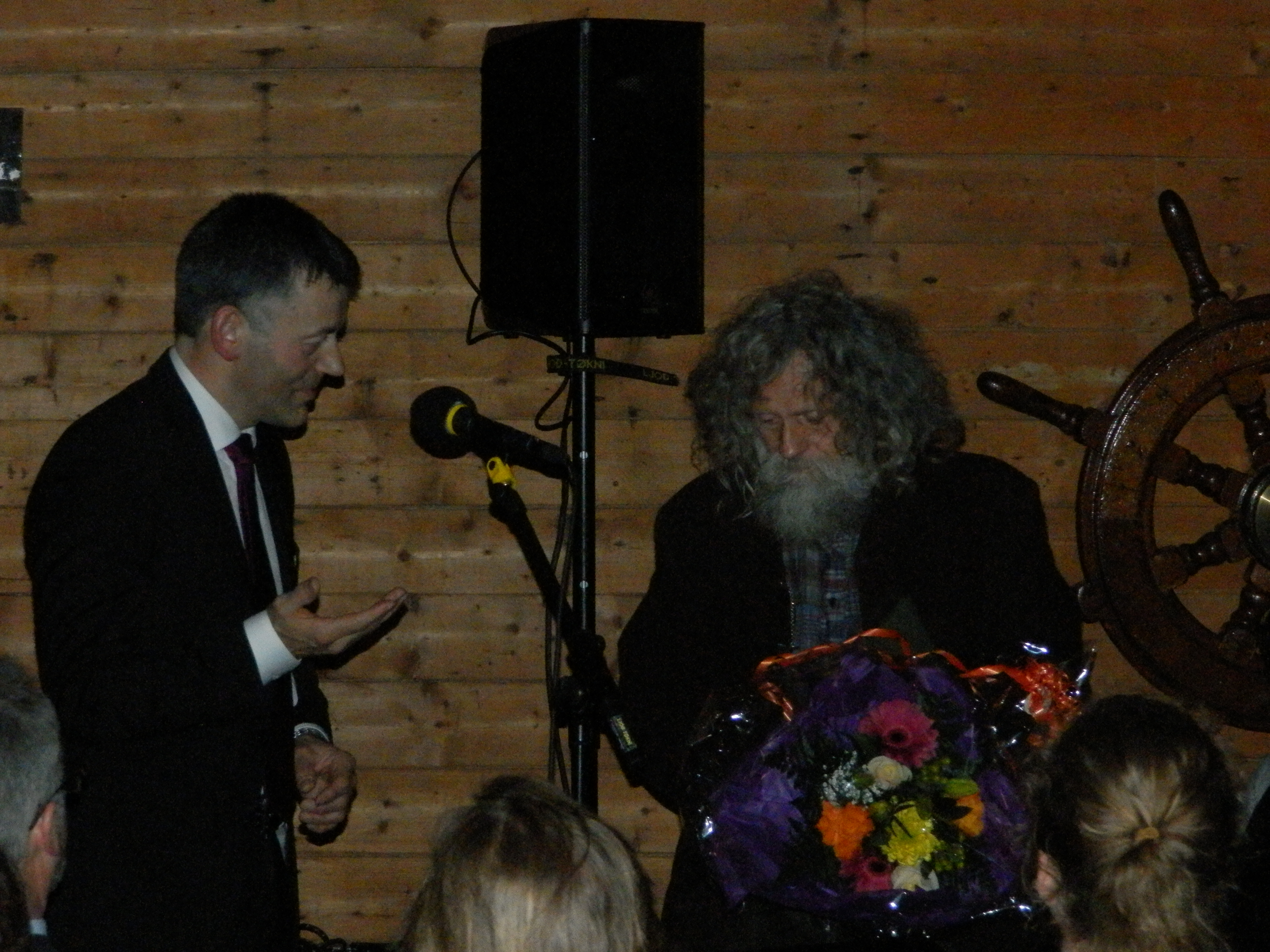
Faroese Cultural Prize 2013 was handed to Tróndur Patursson in Stóra Pakkkhús in Vágur on 15 January 2014. Bjørn Kalsø Minister of Culture handed the award.

The main award, the Mentanarvirðisløn landsins (Faroese Cultural Award), is DDK 150.000. These persons have won the award since it started in 1998:

- 2020 – Sigrun Gunnarsdóttir
- 2019 – Hanus G. Johansen
- 2018 – Bárður Jákupsson
- 2017 – Barbara í Gongini
- 2016 – Rúni Brattaberg
- 2015 – Annika Hoydal
- 2014 – Tórbjørn Olsen
- 2013 – Tróndur Patursson, artist
- 2012 – Tóroddur Poulsen, poet, writer, artist and musician
- 2011 – Jóanes Nielsen, writer and poet
- 2010 – Sunleif Rasmussen, composer
- 2009 – Kári Leivsson (Kári P.), poet and singer/songwriter
- 2008 – Ebba Hentze, writer
- 2006 – Zacharias Heinesen, artist (painter)
- 2005 – Tita Vinther, artist
- 2004 – No award given
- 2003 – Hanus Kamban, short story writer and translator
- 2002 – Gunnar Hoydal, writer
- 2001 – Eyðun Johannessen, actor and theatre director
- 2000 – Ingálvur av Reyni, artist (painter)
- 1999 – Jens Pauli Heinesen, novelist, short story writer and poet
- 1998 – Regin Dahl, poet and composer

=== Heiðursgáva landsins – Faroese Award of Honour ===
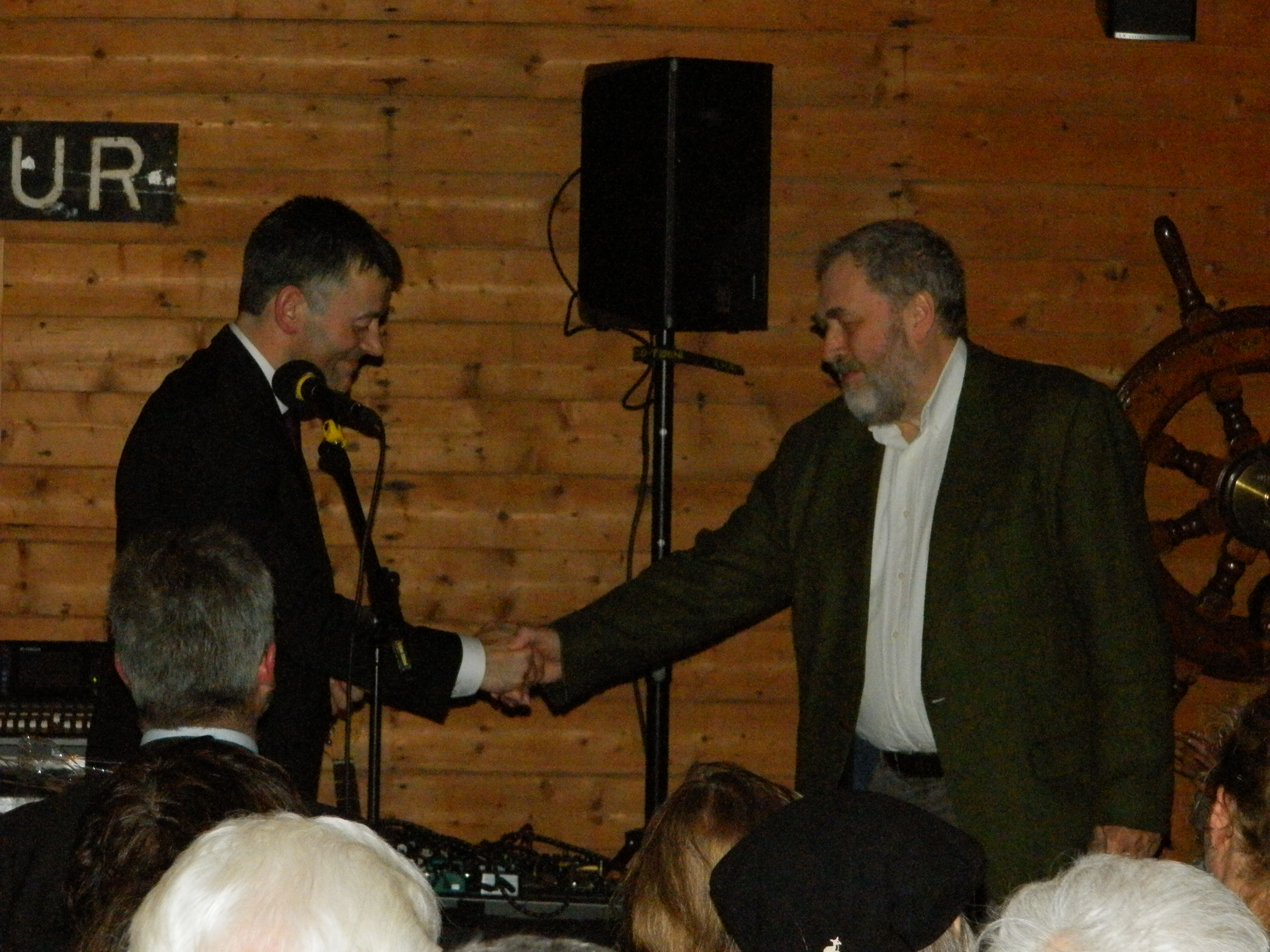
Árni Dahl received the Faroese Award of Honour 2013. Bjørn Kalsø cultural minister handed over the award.

Heiðursgáva landsins is DKK 75.000. These persons and cultural institutions have received the award since 2001:

- 2019 – Simme Arge Jacobsen
- 2018 – Astrid Andreasen
- 2017 – Frits Johannesen
- 2016 – Steinprent
- 2015 – Jákup Pauli Gregoriussen, architect
- 2014 – Tey av Kamarinum
- 2013 – Árni Dahl, writer, editor
- 2012 – Marianne Clausen
- 2011 – Kristian Blak, Danish/Faroese composer, musician and owner of TUTL record company
- 2010 – Jonhard Mikkelsen, who started Sprotin, which publishes Faroese books. He has written and published several Faroese dictionaries
- 2009 – Laura Joensen, theatre actor
- 2008 – Martin Tórgarð, who got the award for his work with the Faroese chain dance and his gifts as skipari of the Faroese dance. (Skipari means skipper or captain, a title given to the person who leads the dance and starts the singing of every verse.)
- 2007 – No award given
- 2006 – Jógvan Isaksen, crime fiction writer. He is also the head of Mentunargrunnur Studentafelagsins, which is a Faroese publishing house in Copenhagen.
- 2005 – Emil Juul Thomsen
- 2004 – No award given
- 2003 – Ólavur Hátún
- 2002 – Axel Tórgarð
- 2001 – Fuglafjarðar Sjónleikarafelag

=== Other Special Awards ===
The board can give a special award of DKK 50.000 if they think it appropriate. These persons have received the award:

==== Award to Young artist – (Virðisløn til ungt listafólk) ====
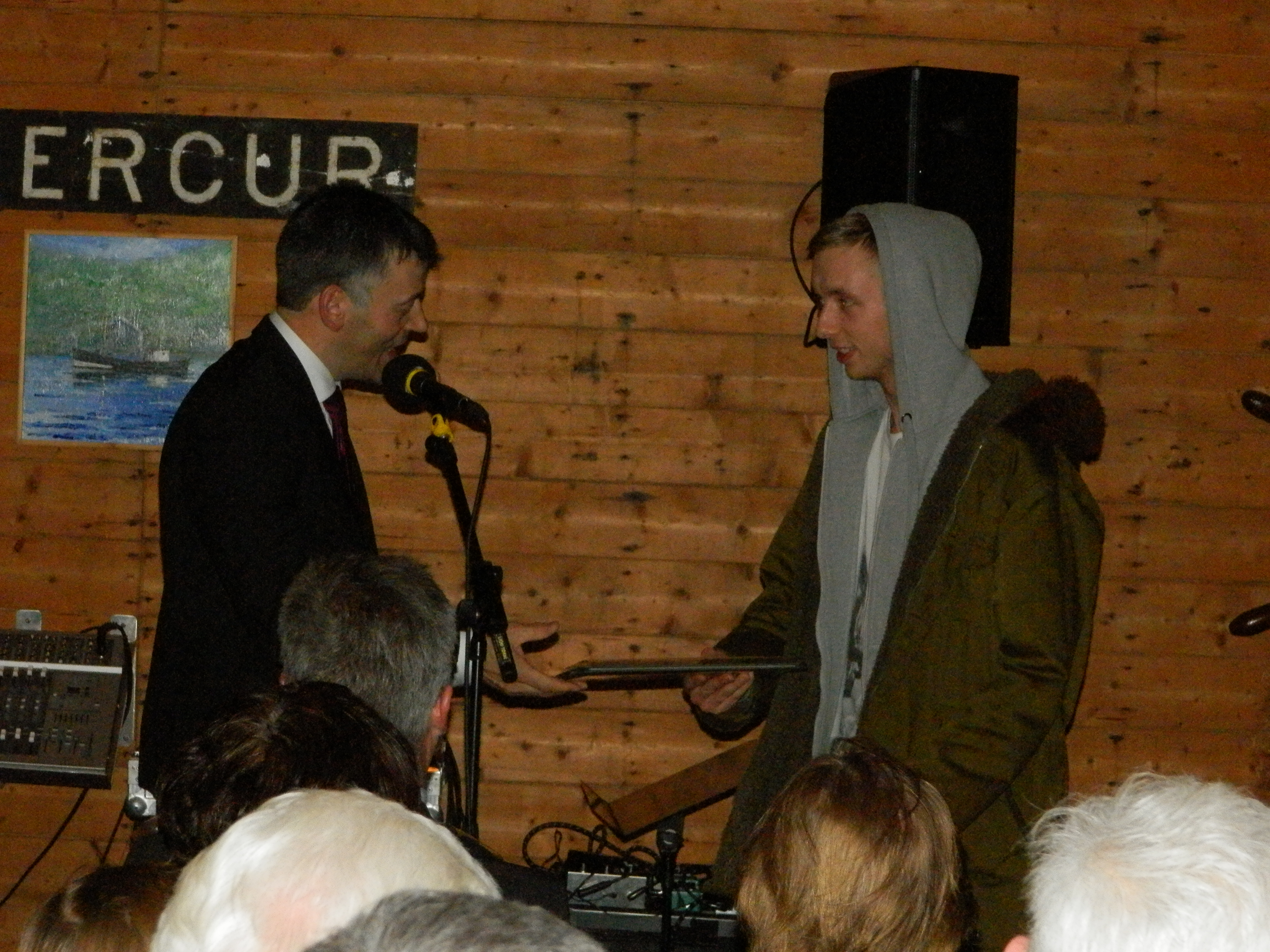
Trygvi Danielsen received the Young Artist Award 2013. It was bestowed by Bjørn Kalsø, the Minister of Culture.

- 2019 – No award given
- 2018 – Búi Rouch, dancer og choreographer
- 2017 – Konni Kass, singer and songwriter.
- 2016 – Anna Malan Jógvansdóttir, poet
- 2015 – Andrias Høgenni, film director
- 2014 – Mathias Kapnas, musician
- 2013 – Trygvi Danielsen, writer and musician
- 2012 – Silja Strøm – young artist
- 2011 – Sakaris Stórá – young film director (25 years old in 2011)

==== Málrøktarvirðisløn Landsins – Award for exceptional work on the Faroese Language ====
- 2010 – Jóhan Hendrik Winther Poulsen, linguist

==== Serstøk virðisløn – Special Award ====
This special award is DKK 50.000. These persons have received the award:

- 2019 – The publication house Leirkerið with the brothers Zacharias Zachariasen and Flóvin Tyril
- 2006 – Jón Hilmar Magnússon
- 2001 – Ebba Hentze, children's writer

==== Sømdargáva landsins ====
Sømdargáva lansins (Faroese Grant) is DKK 20.000, an annual subsidy for the rest of their lives.

- 2015 - Alexandur Kristiansen
- 2014 - Oddvør Johansen
- 2014 - Katrin Ottarsdóttir
- 2012 – Ebba Hentze
- 2012 – Hanus G. Johansen
- 2012 – Guðrið Poulsen

== See also ==
- List of awards for contributions to culture
- Faroese Literature Prize
