= Malan Marnersdóttir =

Malan Marnersdóttir (born 25 January 1952) is a Faroese academic and non-fiction writer.

== Biography ==
The daughter of Doctor Marner Andreas Simonsen and Anna Kristina Godtfred, she was born in Klaksvík and grew up in various places in the Faroe Islands and Denmark. She graduated from high school in Tórshavn and went on to earn degrees in French from Aarhus University and in Danish from the University of Copenhagen. From 1979 to 1981, she taught high school in Tórshavn and, from 1981 to 1983, was a lecturer in Danish and Faroese at Goethe University Frankfurt in Germany. In 1983, she began teaching Faroese and Nordic literature and mass communications at the University of the Faroe Islands. Her area of research is women writers and the role of women in society in the Faroe Islands. She was rector for three years for the University of the Faroe Islands.

Marnersdóttir was contributor and co-editor for the literary journal Brá, which was published from 1982 to 1992. She has written about Faroese literature for various journals. With actor Laura Joensen, she wrote a play Logi, logi, eldur mín about Faroese writer Jóhanna Maria Skylv Hansen. She has also contributed articles on Faroese women writers to Nordisk kvindelitteraturhistorie (The History of Nordic Women's Literature). She has been organizer for conferences held in the Faroe Islands by the International Association of Scandinavian Studies.

In 1981, Marnersdóttir married Hans Laureng. The couple divorced in 1985.

== Awards ==
She received the Faroese Literature Prize for non-fiction in 1993.

== Selected works ==
- Kvinneøddir (1985), on women's involvement in the debate over the first Faroese language newspaper
- Konurák (1989), a survey of the Faroese women's magazine Oyggjarnar
- Fyri fyrst (1992), literary analysis of women writers
- Bylgjurnar leika í trá (1992), literary analysis of women writers
- Føroysk bókmentasøga Volume 1, with Turið Sigurðardóttir (2011), History of Faroese Literature
