= Jóhanna Maria Skylv Hansen =

Faroese writer (1877–1974)

Jóhanna Maria Skylv Hansen (February 17, 1877 – February 2, 1974) was a Faroese writer, the first woman from the Faroe Islands to have her work published.

== Biography ==
The daughter of Thomas Joensen and Pouline Marie Nolsøe, she was born Jóhanna Maria Joensen in Nólsoy and grew up there. She was employed as a maid and, in 1896, she moved with her employer to Hesselø in Denmark. In 1897, she married Anders Hansen. The couple moved to Copenhagen in 1902. They lived there until 1912, when they moved to the Faroe Islands, where her husband looked after various lighthouses in isolated locations on the islands. In 1952, they moved to Tórshavn.

Hansen and her husband had eight children. After her children were older, Hansen began writing. At first, she translated hymns and poetry for publication, including a poem by Hans Christian Andersen. In 1950, she published her first book Gamla götur, a collection of stories based on her childhood memories and stories collected from older people. She published three more volumes of Gamlar gøtur in 1967, 1970 and 1973. She received the Faroese Literature Prize in 1967.

Hansen died in Tórshavn at the age of 96.

In 1988, actor Laura Joensen with Malan Marnersdóttir wrote a play Logi, logi eldur mín about Hansen.
