= Faroese Literature Prize =

The Faroese Literature Prize, also known as the Mentanarvirðisløn M. A. Jacobsens (M. A. Jacobsen's Cultural Award), is a prize for Faroese literature that was begun by the Tórshavnar kommuna (Tórshavn City Council) in 1958. Its winners include Heðin Brú, Jákup Pauli Gregoriussen, Jóanes Nielsen and Kristian Blak. The prize is always awarded at a ceremony in Tórshavn on 17 September or a day close to 17 September, which is the birthday of Mads Andreas Jacobsen. M. A. Jacobsen was a Faroese politician and librarian who headed the National Library of the Faroe Islands, then called Færø Amts Bibliotek in Danish but later renamed Landsbókasavnið, in Faroese. M. A. Jacobsen was the mayor of Tórshavn and a member of the Løgting (the Faroese parliament). The M. A. Jacobsen Prize was at first only for writers, but was later expanded to three categories: one award for Faroese fiction, one for Faroese nonfiction and one for other cultural achievements. In 2012 the prize was worth 35,000 Danish kroner.

Another Faroese cultural prize, called Mentanarvirðisløn Landsins (Faroese Cultural Prize), is currently worth 150,000 DKK. In addition the Heiðursgáva landsins (The Faroese Cultural Department's Award of Honour) as of 2012 is worth 75,000 DKK.

== List of Faroese Literature Prize winners ==
	Fiction	Non-fiction literature	Other Cultural Achievement
2020	Lív Maria Róadóttir Jæger	Hjalmar P. Petersen	Jógvan D. Hansen
2019	Oddfríður Marni Rasmussen	Hanus Kamban	Bernharður Wilkinson
2018	Rannvá Holm Mortensen	No award given	Edward Fuglø
2017	Sissal Kampmann	No award given	Simme Arge Jacobsen
2016	Heðin M. Klein	No award given	Eilif Samuelsen
2015	Carl Jóhan Jensen	Jóan Pauli Joensen	Jákup Veyhe
2014	Kim Simonsen	Óli Olsen	Margreta Næss
2013	Katrin Ottarsdóttir	Poul Jespersen	Turið Sigurðardóttir
2012	Jóanes Nielsen	Eivind Weyhe	Jens-Kjeld Jensen
2011	Non	Nicolina Beder Jensen	Jógvan Isaksen
2010	Tóroddur Poulsen for Útsýni.	Rógvi Mouritsen for Fiskar undir Føroyum	Bjørki Geyti for Føroya Sjósavn
2009	Vida Akselsdóttir Højgaard	Birgar Johannessen for Havnin – fólk og yrki	Arnbjørn Ólavsson Dalsgarð and Oddfríður Marni Rasmussen for the literary magazine Vencil
2008	Sólrún Michelsen	Hanus Kjølbro	Anna Kirstin Thomsen
2007	Martin Joensen	Petur Jacob Sigvardsen	Laura Joensen
2006	Carl Jóhan Jensen	Guðrun Gaard	Ebba Hentze
2005	Non	Turið Kjølbro	Jón Tyril
2004	Sigri Mitra Gaïni	Gianfranco Contri	Mortan Winther Poulsen
2003	Non	Marianne Clausen	Vilhelm Magnussen
2002	Oddvør Johansen	Andras Mortensen	Kristian Blak
2001	Annfinnur í Skála	Bogi Hansen	Zacharias Hammer
2000	Oddfríður Marni Rasmussen	Zakarias Wang	Rigmor Restorff
1999	Non	Dorete Bloch	Martin Tórgarð
1998	Non	Jákup Pauli Gregoriussen	Frits Johannesen
1997	Petur Jensen	Doris Hansen	Ólavur Hátún
1996	Non	Elin Súsanna Jacobsen	Árni Dahl
1995	Kári P.	Martin Næs	Non
1994	Non	Jógvan Isaksen	Non
1993	Jens Pauli Heinesen	Malan Marnersdóttir	Oskar Hermannsson
1992	Tóroddur Poulsen	Non	Non
1991	Bárður Jákupsson	Jóhan Hendrik Winther Poulsen	Non
1990	D. P. Danielsen	Svenning Tausen	Non
1989	Carl Jóhan Jensen	Axel Tórgarð	Non
1988	Rói Patursson	Sigurd Berghamar	Karsten Hoydal
1987	Astrid Joensen	Eyðun Andreassen	Sigurð Joensen
1986	Hanus Andreassen	Hans Jacob Debes	Non
1985	Heðin M. Klein	Niels Juel Arge	Kristian Osvald Viderø
1984	Jóanes Nielsen	Jóhannes av Skarði	Non
1983	Oddvør Johansen	Jørgen M. Olsen	Petur W. Háberg
1982	Gunnar Hoydal	Jóannes Rasmussen	Non
1981	Steinbjørn B. Jacobsen	Erlendur Patursson	Non
1980	Christian Matras	Hanus Andreassen	Non
1979	Regin Dahl	Bjarni Niclasen	Non
1978	Hans Thomsen	Maria Eide Petersen	Non
1977	Alexandur Kristiansen	Jeffrei Henriksen	Non
1976	Rikard Long	Óluva Skaale and Marius Johannesen	Non
1975	William Heinesen	Sámal Johansen	Non
1974	Guðrið Helmsdal	Jákup í Jákupsstovu	Non
1973	Jens Pauli Heinesen and Regin Dahl	Einar Joensen, Poul Petersen og Katrina Østerø	Non
1972	Non	Non	Non
1971	Non	Non	Non
1970	Non	Non	Non
1969	Jens Pauli Heinesen and Rói Patursson	Hans J. Glerfoss and Hanus D. Joensen	Non

== M.A. Jacobsens's Awards Before 1969 ==
1968	Robert Joensen
1967	Johanna Maria Skylv-Hansen
1966	Hans Dalsgaard and Jógvan Símun Hansen
1965	Christian Matras and Páll J. Nolsøe
1964	Heðin Brú
1963	Poul F. Joensen
1962	Martin Joensen
1961	Karsten Hoydal
1960	Valdemar Poulsen
1959	R. K. Rasmussen and Jens Pauli Heinesen
1958	Jóan Christian Poulsen and T.N. Djurhuus
