= Bárður Oskarsson =

Faroese children's writer, illustrator and artist

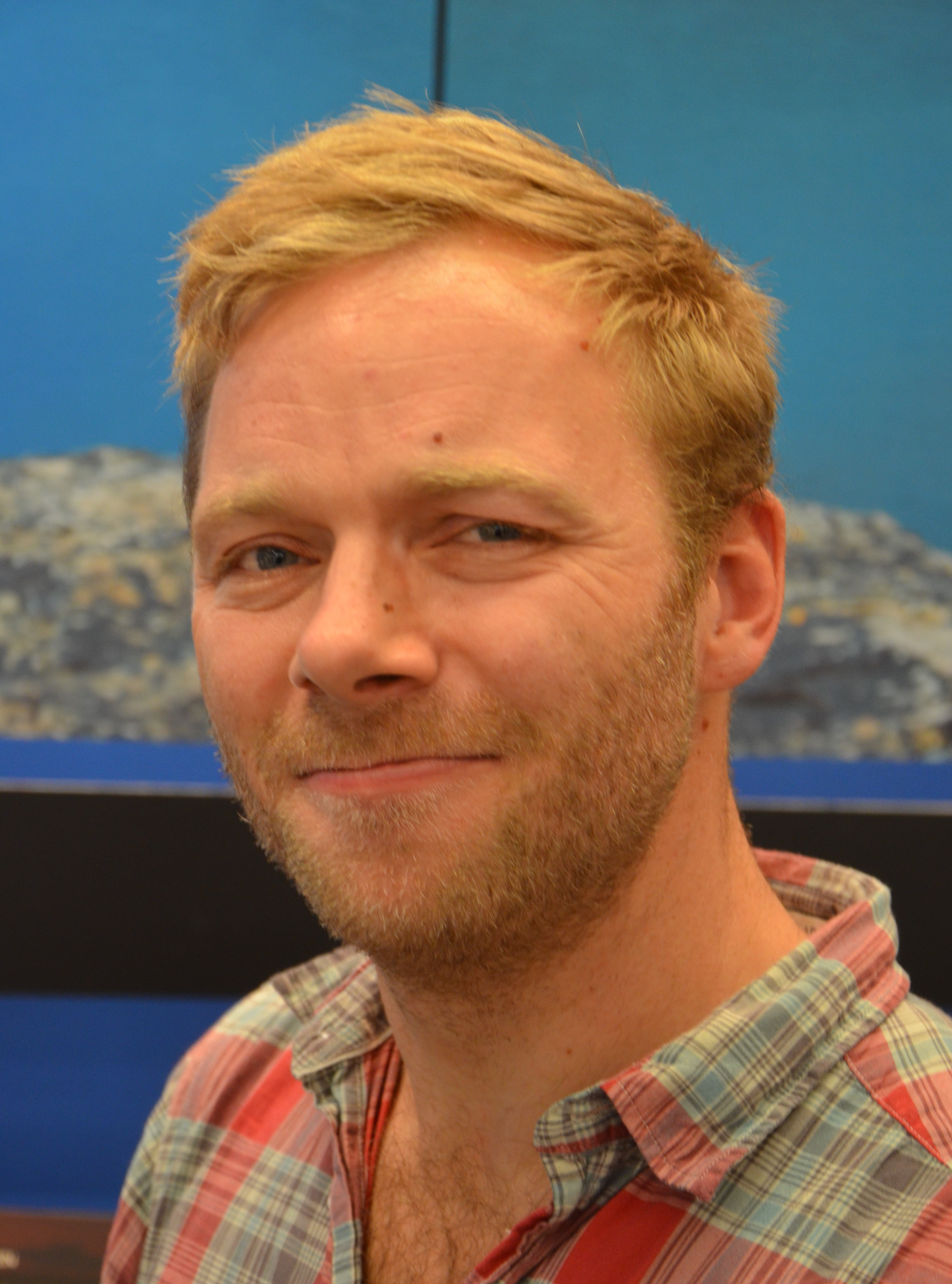
- Bárður Oskarsson
- Born: July 18, 1972 (age 53); Tórshavn
- Occupations: Children's writer; Illustrator
- Years active: 1992–present
- Notable work: Ein hundur ein ketta og ein mús

Bárður Oskarsson (born 18 July 1972 in Tórshavn) is a Faroese children's writer, illustrator and artist, who has won several literary awards. His books have been translated into Danish, Norwegian, Icelandic, French, German, Czech and Dutch.

== Biography ==
He started to draw when he was a child and got some of his drawings published in the Faroese children's magazine Barnablaðið. The first book he illustrated was his grandfather's (Oskar Hermannsson's) children's book "Undir tussafjøllum". After illustrating other authors' books for some years, he published his own book, where he was both writer and illustrator, in 2004. This was the children's book "Ein hundur ein ketta og ein mús" (A dog, a cat and a mouse), which was later published in French (2006), Icelandic (2007), Danish (2008) and Norwegian (2013). Oskarsson has received Faroese, Nordic and German awards for his children's books. He currently lives in Denmark, where he was trained in the art school "Skolen for Billedkunst" 1992–93.

== Bibliography ==
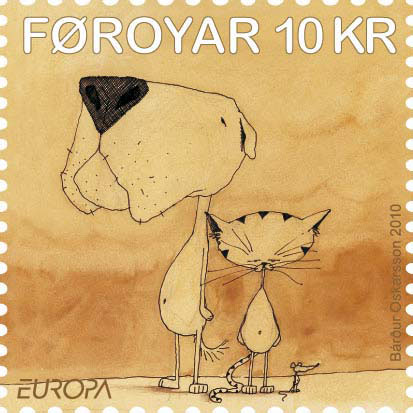
Faroese stamp from 2010 with motif from Oskarsson's book A dog, a cat and a mouse.

=== Children's books, writer and illustrator ===
Children's books, which Bárður Oskarsson has both written and illustrated:

- Ein hundur ein ketta og ein mús, Bókadeild Føroya Lærarafelags (BFL), 2004
  - Le chien, le chat et la souries. Circonflexe 2006 (Published in France)
  - Hundurinn, Kótturin og Músin, Mál og Menning, 2007, (Published in Iceland)
  - En hund, en kat og en mus. Torgard, 2008. (Published in Denmark)
  - En Hund en Katt og ei Mus, Orkana, 2013. (Published in Norway)
- Beini, BFL, 2007
  - Kødbenet. Torgard, 2008 (Published in Denmark)
- Pól, hin kuli giraffurin, BFL, 2007
  - Poul, en cool giraf. Torgard, 2009. (Published in Denmark)
- Flata kaninin, BFL, 2011
  - Den flade kanin. Torgard, 2011. (Published in Denmark)
  - Das platte Kaninchen, Jacoby & Stuart, 2013 (Published in Germany)
  - Den flate Kaninen, Orkana, 2013. (Published in Norway)
  - A lapos nyuszi, Közép-európai Sarkvidék Egyesület, 2018 (Published in Hungary)
- Stríðið um tað góða grasið, BFL, 2012

=== Children's books, which Bárður Oskarsson has illustrated ===
- Tussarnir á tussatindi, Oskar Hermannsson, Bókadeild Føroya Lærarafelags (BFL), 1993
- Tunnuflakin, Marianna Debes Dahl, Skúlabókagrunnurin. 1990
- Margreta og Mjólkin, Sigga Vang, BFL, 2002
- Um svidnu pussifelluna og øvuta kúvingin, Guðrun Gaard, BFL, 2003
- Tónalæra 1, 2, 3, 4, Skúlabókgrunnurin, 2004
- Um træskoytur og føðingardagsgávuna sum hvarv, Guðrun Gaard, BFL, 2004
- Um gentur og tunnuflakar og ein ommuprikkutan kjóla, Guðrun Gaard, BFL, 2005

== Art exhibitions ==
Art exhibitions which Bárður Oskarsson participated either by himself and together with others:

- Listasavn Føroya, Tórshavn, FO, 2013
- North Atlantic House, Copenhagen, DK, 2013
- Stefansonshús, FO, 2013
- Gallery Focus, FO, 2012
- My Imaginary Library, Europe, 2007
- Christiania, Copenhagen, DK, 2006
- Leikalund, FO, 2006
- Cafe Jonas, DK, 2005
- North Atlantic House, Copenhagen, DK, 2005
- Smiðjan í Lítluvík, Tórshavn, FO, 2004
- Føroyahúsið (The Faroese House in Copenhagen), DK, 2003
- Smiðjan í Lítluvík, FO, 2002

== Awards and nominations ==
- 2006 - White Raven of The international children`s digital library, Special Mention, for the book Ein hundur, ein ketta og ein mús (English title: A dog, a cat, and a mouse)
- Grunnur Torvald Poulsens, 2005 (scholarship)
- 2006 - West Nordic Council's Children and Youth Literature Prize
- 2007 - Barnabókaheiðursløn Tórshavnar býráðs
- 2013 - White Raven of The international children's digital library for the book Stríðið um tað góða grasið (English title: The quarrel over the good grass)
- 2013 - Der LUCHS-Preis für Kinder- und Jugendliteratur nr. 322 for "Das platte kaninchen", November, 2013.
- 2014 - Nominated for the Nordic Council Children and Young People's Literature Prize for the book Flata kaninin
- 2015 - Received a one-year working grant from Mentanargrunnur Landsins (from the Faroese Ministry of Culture).
- 2016 - Nominated for the Nordic Council Children and Young People’s Literature Prize for the book Stríðið um tað góða grasið
- 2018 - Winner of the Nordic Council Children and Young People's Literature Prize
- 2024 - Nominated for the Astrid Lindgren Memorial Award
