= Steinbjørn B. Jacobsen =

Faroese poet, teacher and writer

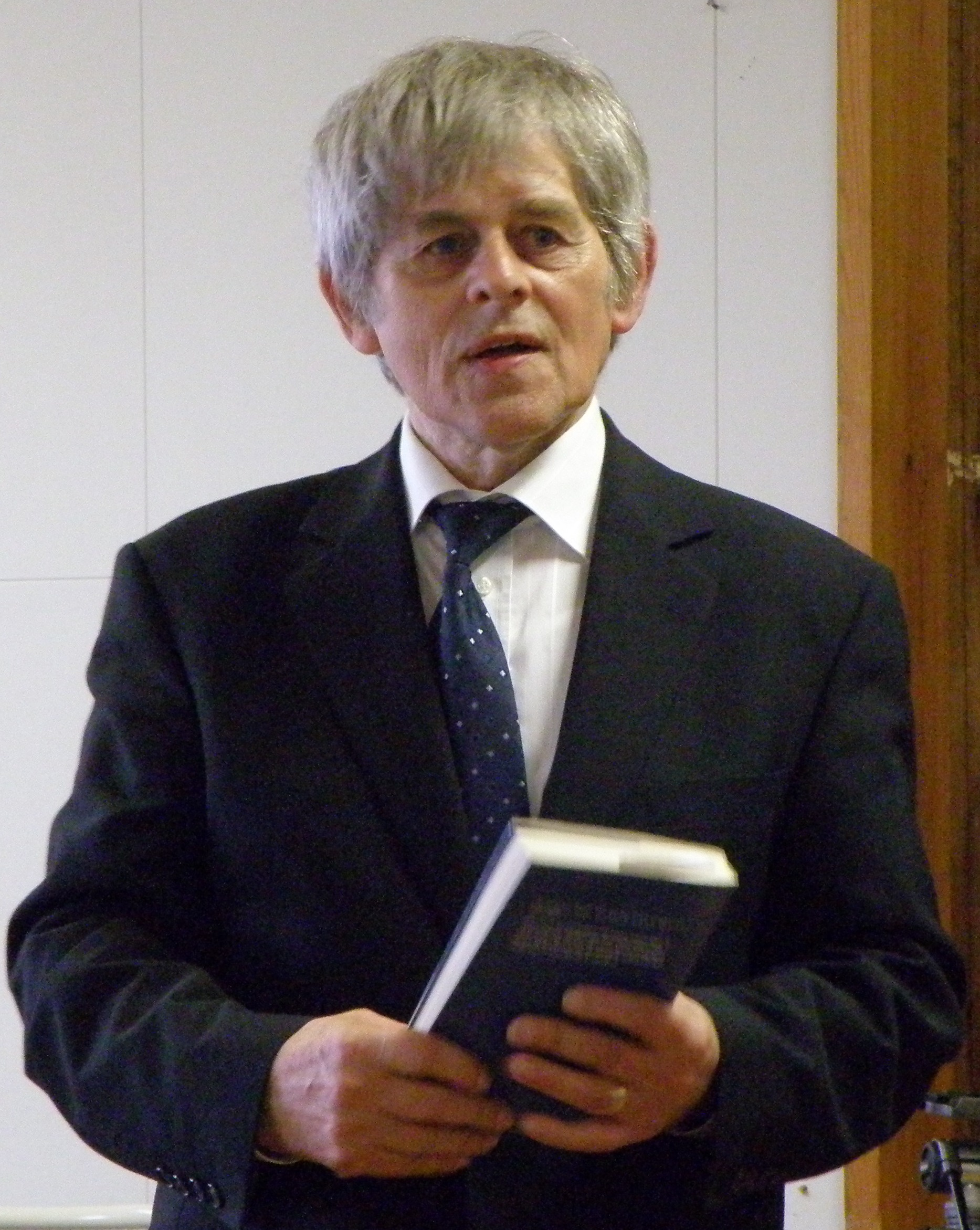
- Steinbjørn B. Jacobsen in 2011
- Born: 30 September 1937; Sandvík, Faroe Islands
- Died: 12 April 2012 (aged 74); Tórshavn, Faroe Islands
- Occupations: Teacher, writer
- Writing career
- Genres: Children's literature, novels, short stories, poems, plays

Steinbjørn Berghamar Jacobsen (30 September 1937 – 12 April 2012) was a Faroese poet, teacher and writer. He was known as a children's writer, but his works also included short stories, plays and novels. He was awarded the Faroese Literature Prize for fiction in 1981.

Jacobsen was born in Sandvík on 30 September 1937. He died on 12 April 2012 in Tórshavn, Faroe Islands, at the age of 74.

In the month after his death two of his children gave musical form to eleven of their father's poems. His son Kári Jacobsen composed melodies for the poems. Steinbjørn B. Jacobsen's daughter Eyð B. Jacobsen sang the songs, which were recorded and released by Tutl, a Faroese record label. The album's title is Tungl, Steinbjørn B. Jacobsen, Tungl being the title of a poetry collection published by Jacobsen in 1987.

== Bibliography ==
=== Children's books ===
- Hønan og hanin, children's book, 1970, 2nd edition 1976 at the same time published in Norwegian also, 3rd 3. edition 1987, all together 5000 books.
- Hin snjóhvíti kettlingurin, children's novel 1971, translated into Swedish and printed in Kammeratposten in 1974, 2nd edition 1987, total: 5000 books.
- Mæið, children's novel 1972, 2nd edition in 1976 and at the same time in Norwegian, 3rd edition in 1987, all together 6000 books printed.
- Krákuungarnir, children's novel 1972, 4000 books printed.
- Lív og hundurin, children's novel 1974.
- Gráisteinur, children's novel, 1975, 3000 books printed.
- Hin reyða ryssan, children's novel 1979, published in Norwegian translation in 1980.
- Maria og rossið, children's novel, (about the same theme as "Hin reyða ryssan", about a red horse), 1980, in Norwegian translation in 1982.
- Lív og dýrini, children's novel, 1981.
- Mia og Eyð, children's book 1981
- Reyða, children's novel 1983 (the final book about the horse Reyða Ryssa), in Norwegian, 1985.
- Sí og Sú, children's novel, 1985.
- Uni og Una, children's book, 1987.
- Sí og Sú síggja, children's book, 1987.
- Vár og mánin, children's book 1989, printed together with translations in Norwegian and Swedish.
- Lítli Páll í Nólsoy, children's novel, 1992.
- Tvey systkin, children's novel, 1993.
- Eftir nátungum, children's novel, 1993.
- Jólabørn, 24 children's short stories, útvarpskalendarin (The Faroese Radio's Christmas Calendar) 1999.
- Eg eigi, children's book, 2001.

=== Poems ===
- Heimkoma, poems 1966, 700 books printed.
- Fræ, poems 1968, 500 books printed
- Kjøkr, poems, 500 books printed.
- Tægr, poems, 1980.
- Lív, yrkingar, ognað øllum ið missa, poems (dedicated for all who have lost a dear one, Jacobsen lost his daughter Lív) 1981, 1000 books.
- Læraramyndir, poems, 1984.
- Tungl, poems, 1987.
- Tinna og Tám, poems, 1997.
- Karr, poems, 2001.
- Contributed to the first ever Faroese/German anthology “From Janus Djurhuus to Tóroddur Poulsen – Faroese Poetry during 100 Years”, academic advice: Turið Sigurðardóttir, lineartranslation: Inga Meincke (2007), edited by Paul Alfred Kleinert.

=== Novels ===
- Hall, novel, 1984, 1300 books, 2nd edition in 1985, 500 books printed.
- Kasta, novel 1991, 1200 books printed.

=== Short stories ===
- Á veg millum bygda, collection of short stories, 1975, 1000 books printed.

=== Plays ===
- Ivaliva og aðrir leikir, Ivaliva og einaktaran Fløskurnar, plays, performed in 1969, published in 1975, 700 books printed.
- Skipið, play, performed in 1975, translated into Icelandic and performed in National Theatre of Iceland 1977, published in 1982..
- Tey bæði í húsinum, play 1982, 1000 books printed, performed in Tórshavn the same year.
- Trý leikrit, 1985, 500 books.
- Húsið o.a. stutt, plays, 1997.
- Nólsoyar Páll, play 2000.

=== Plays for radio and TV ===
- Soleiðis er, radio play 2006. (Has not been published nor played yet (as of May 2012)
- Den gode vilje, sjónvarpsleikur á donskum (TV play in Danish), together with Gunnar Hoydal, 1976. (In Danish)
- Náttúran og børnini, barnafilmshandrit,(manuscript for a children's film) 1977.

=== Memoirs ===
- Grund 1, memoirs 2004.
- Grund 2, memoirs 2005.
- Grund 3, memoirs and the history of Sandvík, the village where he grew up, 2011.

=== Other works as editor etc. ===
- Flytifuglur, collection of foreign poems, translated into Faroese, together with Heðin M. Klein, 1972.
- Sjón og seiggj, collection in honour of Erlendur Patursson, editor together with Heðin M. Klein, 1983.
- Ung orð 1, 1984 og Ung orð 2, 1985, collections, editor together with Árni Dahl and Ása Magnussen.
- Hon kysti hann, collection of Faroese love poems, 1985.
- Floygd orð 1 and Floygd orð 2, 1988, collection, editor together with Árni Dahl, Ása Magnussen and Páll Sivertsen.
- Brá úr USA, travelogue, 1982.
- Dia og Mia, school book for the Faroese language, 1982.
- Bárður Jákupsson, a book about the art of the Faroese artist Bárður Jákupsson, 1994.
- Her eru vit, songs for children on an audio cassette, 1984.

== Honours ==
- 1976 Barnabókaheiðursløn Tórshavnar býráðs (Award for Children's Books from Tórshavn Municipality)
- 1981 Faroese Literature Prize (In Faroese: Mentanarvirðisløn M. A. Jacobsens) (M. A. Jacobsen's Award)
- 1985 Barnabókaheiðursløn Tórshavnar býráðs (Award for Children's Books from Tórshavn Municipality)
