= Carl Jóhan Jensen =

Faroese writer, poet and literary critic

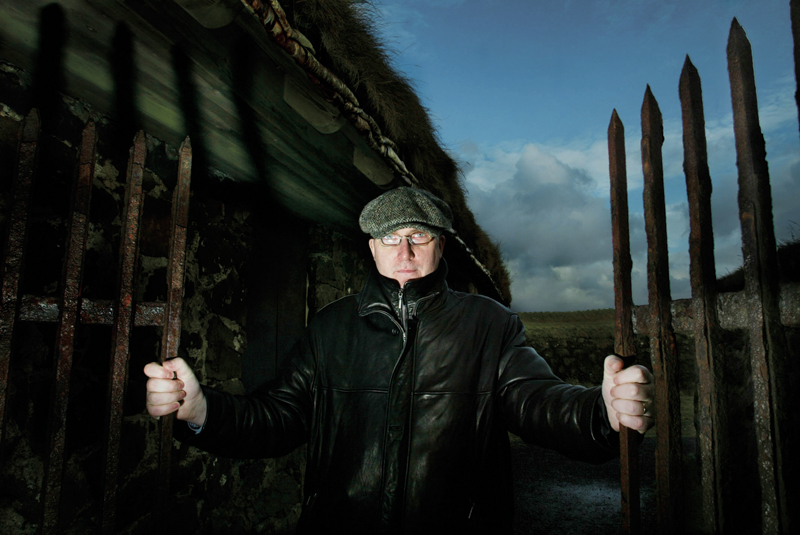
Carl Jóhan Jensen

Carl Jóhan Jensen (2 December 1957) is a Faroese writer, poet and literary critic. His books have five times been nominated for the Nordic Council's Literature Prize in 1991, 1998, 2007, 2008 and 2016. In 1989 and 2006 he received the M. A. Jacobsen's Cultural Prize from Tórshavn City Council

== Biography ==
Jensen was born and grew up in Tórshavn and moved to Denmark in 1973 to attend a Danish gymnasium (a preparatory high school). Having graduated, he moved back to the Faroe Islands in 1976, where he worked in various jobs, i.e. as a journalist. From 1979 to 1981 he studied the Faroese language at the Faroese University in Tórshavn, and from 1981 to 1987 studied Icelandic in Reykjavík. In 1990 he graduated cand.phil. in Faroese.

He and his Australian wife Kate Sanderson have two sons. They live in Tórshavn, though with a period spent abroad, when Sanderson, having worked for the Faroese government as a special advisor for several years, was sent in 2012 for a three-year term as Faroese ambassador to the EU, based in Brussels. Jensen accompanied her.

== Bibliography ==
Jensen published his first poems in 1977. He has also published novels and essays, and has translated various texts into Faroese, i.e. Strindberg, Ayckbourn, Dario Fo og Einar Kárason. His work has appeared in literary journals and anthologies in Denmark, Norway, Sweden, the Netherlands, Germany and the United States.

In October 2011 he was one of ten Faroese writers invited to participate at the Frankfurt Book Fair. it was the first time the Faroe Islands had been invited, and they participated together with Iceland. the guest of honour for that year. Carl Jóhan Jensen's novel Ó – Søgur um djevulsskap was one of the ten books chosen.

In 2013 one of his poems represented the Faroe Islands in the EU literary event Transpoesie 2013. The poem was Tú (You) and is also available in French and Dutch translation.

Jensen was president of the Association of Writers of the Faroe Islands (Rithøvundafelag Føroya) 1991–92 and 2004–2006.

=== Novels ===
- 1979: Seinnapartur (Afternoon)
- 1995: Rúm (Room)
- 2005: Ó – Søgur um djevulskap, (no official title in English, working title: Un-, Tales of Devilry), Sprotin, 786 pp., ISBN 978-99918-44-82-4
- * 2010: U-, historier om djevelskap. Det Norske Samlaget. Translated into Norwegian by Lars Moa.
- 2014: Eg síggi teg betur í myrkri (I see thee better – in the dark)

=== Poetry ===
- 1977: Yrkingar
- 1982: Skríggj, Mentunargrunnur studentafelagsins.
- 1984: Messa á kvøldi og fram undir morgun, Mentunargrunnur studentafelagsins.
- 1990: Hvørkiskyn, Mentunargrunnar Studentafelagsins
- 1997: Tímar og rek, Mentunargrunnur studentafelagsins.
- 2006: September í bjørkum sum kanska eru bláar (audiobook)
- Contributed to the first ever Faroese/German anthology “From Janus Djurhuus to Tóroddur Poulsen – Faroese Poetry during 100 Years”, academic advice: Turið Sigurðardóttir, lineartranslation: Inga Meincke (2007), edited by Paul Alfred Kleinert.

=== Essays ===
- 2000: Mentir og mentaskapur

== Awards, nominations etc. ==
- 1989: Received the M. A. Jacobsen's Cultural Prize from Tórshavn City Council
- 1991: Nominated for the Nordic Council's Literature Prize
- 1998: Nominated for the Nordic Council's Literature Prize
- 2006: Received the M. A. Jacobsen's Cultural Prize
- 2007: Nominated for the Nordic Council's Literature Prize for his novel Ó – Søgur um djevulsskap
- 2008: Nominated for the Nordic Council's Literature Prize for September í bjørkum sum kanska eru bláar
- 2011: One year grant from the Mentanargrunnur Landsins (Faroese Cultural Fund)
- 2015: Received the Mentanarvirðisløn M. A. Jacobsens
- 2016: Nominated for the Nordic Council's Literature Prize for Eg síggi teg betri í myrkri
