= Annfinnur í Skála =

Faroese writer

Annfinnur í Skála (born 20 September 1941 in Tórshavn, Faroe Islands) is a Faroese writer. He holds an MA in history and English and has taught at the Faroese upper secondary school since 1975.

== Bibliography ==
=== History and society schoolbooks ===
- Stjórnarskipanarmálið 1946. Keldur til Føroya søgu. (Danish: Færøernes forfatningsmæssige stilling i 1946. Kilder til Færøernes historie). Føroya Skúlabókagrunnur. Tórshavn 1994
- Frá stórkríggi til heimskríggj 1918-1939 (From grand war to world war 1918-1939). Føroya Skúlabókagrunnur. Tórshavn 1994
- Søga Týsklands 1918-1939 (History of Germany 1918-1939). Føroya Skúlabókagrunnur, Tórshavn 1994

=== Dictionaries ===
- Ensk-føroysk orðabók (English-Faroese dictionary). (Co-authors: Jonhard Mikkelsen and Zakarias Wang). Stiðin, Tórshavn 1992
- Donsk-føroysk orðabók (Danish-Faroese dictionary). (Co-authors: Jonhard Mikkelsen, Hanna Jacobsen and Zakarias Wang). Stiðin. Tórshavn 1998
- Føroysk-ensk orðabók (Faroese-English dictionary). (Co-author: Jonhard Mikkelsen. Sprotin). Tórshavn 2008
- Ensk-føroysk orðabók (English-Faroese dictionary from 1992, revideret og udvidet). (Co-author: Jonhard Mikkelsen). Sprotin. Tórshavn 2008

=== Fiction ===
- Heimurin forni 1. Hjá dvørgum í Niðafjøllum. Sprotin. Tórshavn 2000
- Heimurin forni 2. Ferðin til Zambora. Sprotin. Tórshavn 2000

=== Crime and Science fiction ===
Vitjan…, (Visit) Sprotin, 2011

== Awards ==
- 2001 - Faroese Literature Prize (Mentanarvirðisløn M. A. Jacobsens)
