= Regin Dahl =

Faroese poet and composer

- Born: 5 November 1918; Tórshavn, Faroe Islands
- Died: 29 March 2007 (aged 88); Copenhagen, Denmark
- Occupations: poet; composer

Regin Dahl (5 November 1918 – 29 March 2007) was a Faroese author and composer.

== Biography ==
Dahl came from a literary family; his father being the translator and provost Jákup Dahl. His own poetry has been described as more modernistic than that of many previous Faroese poets.

His family also contained musicians like his grandfather Georg Casper Hansen, and Dahl himself was noted as a composer. In youth he did not know how to transcribe his compositions so would work on them in his head before performing them at cultural events. As a composer he wrote musical settings for 34 Erik Axel Karlfeldt poems and created around 450 compositions in all.

In the mid 1990s, Marianne Clausen made musical transcriptions of his many compositions, and published them as Atlantsløg and Atlantsløg II under his name.

== Recognition ==
Dahl was honoured in 1998 with the Faroese Cultural Prize (Mentanarvirðisløn Landsins). He was the first person to receive this annual award.
