= Jógvan Isaksen =

Faroese writer & literary historian

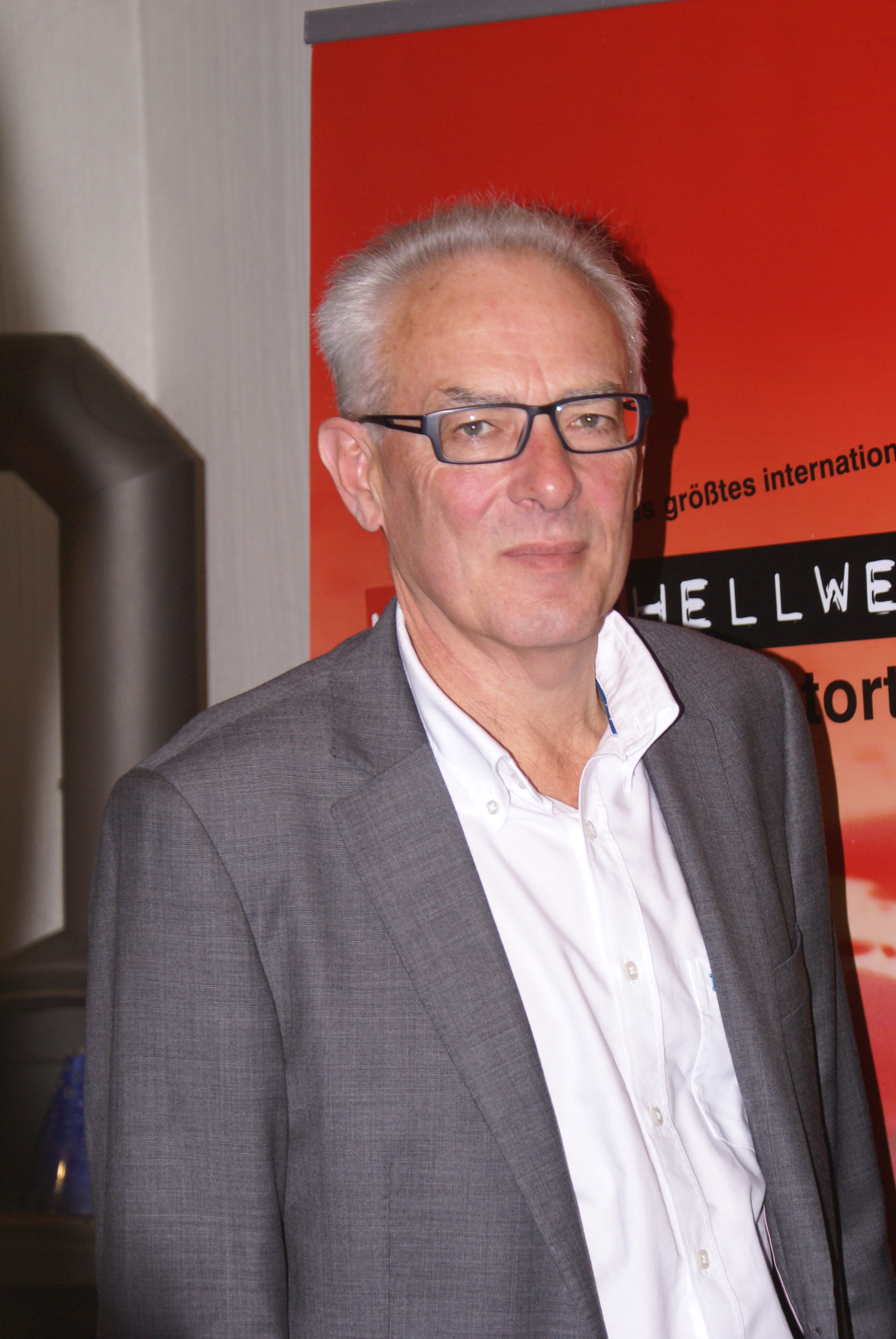
- Born: 25 August 1950 (age 76); Tórshavn, Faroe Islands
- Occupations: Novelist and literary historian
- Writing career
- Language: Danish, Faroese
- Genres: Crime fiction, horror fiction, mystery fiction, children's books
- Subjects: Crime, thriller, mystery

Jógvan Isaksen (born 25 August 1950 in Tórshavn) is a Faroese writer and literary historian. He is best known for his crime novels and for his book about Faroese literature Færøsk Litteratur (1993, in Danish). He is leader of the Faroese publication house Mentunargrunnur Studentafelagsins which has its address in the Faroe Islands, though its committee is located in Copenhagen. It publishes Faroese books and is the oldest Faroese publishing house, having been founded in 1910.

== Biography ==
Jógvan Isaksen is the son of Magnhild Isaksen née Olsen and Reimar Isaksen, who both come from the village of Gøta. After finishing high school in 1970 he moved to Denmark in order to study Nordic Philology at Aarhus University. He finished his MA in Scandinavian Literature Science in 1982. Since 1986 he has been associate Professor in Faroese language and Faroese literature at the University of Copenhagen. Since 2000 he has been the main editor of the magazine Nordisk litteratur (Nordic Literature), put out by the Nordic Council.

Since 1978 Isaksen has also worked as a writer. His crime novels are popular in the Faroe Islands and are often best sellers just before Christmas. Some of them have been translated into other languages. Isaksen has also written some children's books and books about Faroese writers and literature. For his work about the Faroese writer Hanus Kamban (whose name at that time was Hanus Andreassen) and for his work for Faroese Literature, Isaksen received the Faroese Literature Prize in 1994. In 2006 he received one of the prizes of the Faroese Government, called Heiðursgáva landsins.

The crime novel Blíð er summarnátt á Føroyalandi was Isaksen's first in that genre, and one of the first written in Faroese where the events take place in the Faroe Islands. It has been translated into Danish, Icelandic and German.

== Bibliography ==
=== Crime fiction ===
- 1990 – Blíð er summarnátt á Føroyalandi
  - 1991 – Danish: Blid er den færøske sommernat, ISBN 87-7456-426-9
  - 2011 – Danish: Blid er den færøske sommernat, 2nd edition, paperback. ISBN 978-87-92286-30-7
  - 1995 – German: Mild ist die färöische Sommernacht, Pettersson, Münster 1995 (1994) (= Morden im Norden 1) ISBN 3-930704-00-5
  - 2006 – German: Neuausgabe: Endstation Färöer, Grafit ISBN 3-89425-549-8
- 1994 – Gráur oktober. Crime fiction novel.
  - 1995 – Danish: Grå oktober, ISBN 87-7456-478-1
  - 2011 – Danish: Grå oktober, 2nd edition, paperback. ISBN 978-87-92286-31-4
  - 2007 – German: Option Färöer. Grafit
- 1996 – Á ólavsøku. Ein summarkrimi í 9 pørtum (A summer crime novel in 9 parts.)
- 2005 – Krossmessa, krimi, ISBN 99918-43-62-0
  - 2009 – Danish: Korsmesse, Torgard, ISBN 978-87-92286-14-7
  - 2011 – Danish: Korsmesse, 2. udgave, paperback. ISBN 978-87-92286-39-0
  - 2016 – English: Walpurgis Tide, Norvik Press. ISBN 978-1-909408-24-1
- 2006 – Adventus Domini
- 2008 – Metusalem
  - 2011 – Danish: Metusalem, translated by Povl Skårup, published by Torgard, 259 pages, ISBN 978-87-92286-29-1
- 2009 – Norðlýsi
- 2010 – Norska Løva, (Crime fiction, about the detective Hannis Martinsson. Norska Løva or Norske Løve refers to a Danish ship, which sank in Lambavík in the Faroe Islands on 31 December 1707. Around 100 men survived and 14 lost their lives.)
- 2011 – Deydningar dansa á Sandi, (Crime fiction, about the detective Hannis Martinsson)
  - 2023 – English: Dead Men Dancing, Norvik Press. ISBN 978-1-909408-72-2
- 2012 – Tann fimti maðurin, (Crime fiction, about the detective William Hammer)
- 2013 – Prædikarin. (Crime fiction, about the detective William Hammer), Mentunargrunnur Studentafelagsins
- 2014 – Vølundarhús. (Crime Fiction about the detective Hannis Martinsson). Mentunargrunnur Studentafelagsins. ISBN 978-99918-75-24-8
- 2015 – Hitt blinda liðið. Krimi (Crime Fiction about the detective William Hammer). Mentunargrunnur Studentafelagsins. ISBN 978-99918-75-38-5
- 2017 – Heljarportur. (Crime fiction about the detective William Hammer). Marselius. ISBN 978-99918-79-01-7
- 2018 – Anathema. (Crime fiction about the detective William Hammer). Marselius. ISBN 978-99918-79-03-1
- 2019 – Arktis. (Crime fiction about the detective William Hammer). Marselius. ISBN 978-99918-79-04-8
- 2020 – Paranoia. (Crime fiction about the detectives Hannis Martinsson and William Hammer). Marselius. ISBN 9789991879055
- 2021 – Nivlheimur. (Crime fiction about the detective Hannis Martinsson). Marselius. ISBN 978-99918-79-10-9
- 2022 – Halgigripaskrínið. (Crime fiction about the detective William Hammer). Marselius. ISBN 978-99918-79-11-6
- 2023 – Hvíldarheimið. (Crime fiction about the detective Hannis Martinsson). Marselius. ISBN 978-99918-79-12-3
- 2024 – Altartalvan. (Crime fiction about the detective Hannis Martinsson). Marselius. ISBN 978-99918-79-14-7
- 2025 – Kavafonnin grætur. (Crime fiction about the detective William Hammer). Marselius. ISBN 978-99918-79-15-4

=== Children's books ===
- 1991 – Brennivargurin, detective novel for children
  - 1998 – Brandstifteren, Forlaget Vindrose, ISBN 87-7456-564-8
- 1996 – Teir horvnu kirkjubøstólarnir. Children's book
- 1999 – Barbara og tann horvna bamsan, children's book

=== Other works ===
- 1983 – Føroyski Mentunarpallurin. Greinir og ummæli
- 1986 – Ongin rósa er rósa allan dagin. Um skaldskapin hjá Róa Paturssyni
  - 1988 – Ingen rose er rose hele dagen. Rói Paturssons digtning. (Translated to Danish)
- 1987 – Amariel Norðoy. Tekstur (Text): Jógvan Isaksen. Yrkingar (Poems): Rói Patursson. Together with Anfinnur Johansen, Dorthe Juul Myhre, Troels Mark Pedersen and Rógvi Thomsen
- 1988 – Í gráum eru allir litir. Bókmentagreinir
- 1988 – At taka dagar ímillum. Um at ummæla og eitt úrval av ummælum
- 1988 – Ein skúladagur í K. Føroyskar skemtisøgur. Í úrvali og við inngangi eftir Jógvan Isaksen (Faroese short stories, introduction by Jógvan Isaksen)
- 1989 – Ingálvur av Reyni. Text: Gunnar Hoydal. Together with Dorthe Juul Myhre, Amariel Norðoy and Rógvi Thomsen
- Færøsk litteratur. Introduktion og punktnedslag. Det arnamagnæanske institut, 1992.
- 1992 – Ingi Joensen: Reflektión. Fotobók (Photo book). Together with Dorthe Juul Myhre and Amariel Norðoy
- 1993 – Í hornatøkum við Prokrustes. Hanus Andreassen's short stories
- 1993 – Færøsk Litteratur. Forlaget Vindrose, ISBN 87-7456-478-1. (About Faroese Literature)
- 1995 – Treð dans fyri steini. Bókmentagreinir, 1995.
- 1995 – Zacharias Heinesen. Tekstur: Jógvan Isaksen. Together with Amariel Norðoy, Dorthe Juul Myhre, Helga Fossádal and Jon Hestoy
- 1996 – Var Kafka klaksvíkingur? 26 ummælir
- 1997 – Tekstur til Amariel Norðoy. Norðurlandahúsið í Føroyum
- 1997 – Omkring Barbara. Greinasavn. Together with Jørgen Fisker, Nils Malmros and John Mogensen, 1997.
- 1997 – Homo Viator. Um skaldskapin hjá Gunnari Hoydal (About the literature work by Gunnar Hoydal)
- 1998 – William Heinesen: Ekskursion i underverdenen. I udvalg og med efterskrift af Jógvan Isaksen
- 1998 – Á verðin, verðin! Skaldsøgan "Barbara" eftir Jørgen-Frantz Jacobsen (About Jørgen-Frantz Jacobsen novel Barbara.
- 1999 – Jørgen-Frantz Jacobsen: Den yderste kyst – og andre essays. I udvalg og med efterskrift af Jógvan Isaksen
- 2000 – Ingálvur av Reyni. Víðkað og broytt útgáva (Udvidet udgave). Together with Amariel Norðoy, Dorthe Juul Myhre and Gunnar Hoydal
- 2001 – Livets geniale relief – omkring Jørgen-Frantz Jacobsens roman Barbara, (Around Jørgen-Frantz Jacobsen's novel Barbara), ISBN 87-91078-04-0
- 2002 – Deyðin er drívmegin. Bókimentagreinir (Articles about literature). Mentunargrunnur Studentafelagsins.
- 2004 – Mellem middelalder og modernitet – Omkring William, Mentunargrunnur Studentafelagsins. (About the authorship of William Heinesen)
- 2006 – Loystur úr fjøtrum – Um skaldskapin hjá Heðini Brú, Mentunargrunnur Studentafelagsins. (About the authorship of Heðin Brú)
- 2008 – Dulsmál og loynigongir. Ummælir (Reviews). Mentunargrunnur Studentafelagsins
- 2010 – Sóttrøll. Um søgur og skaldsøgur eftir Jens Paula Heinesen, Mentunargrunnur Studentafelagsins. (About short stories and novels by Jens Pauli Heinesen).
- 2014 – At myrða við skrivaraborðið. 141 pages. Mentunargrunnur Studentafelagsins.
- 2019 – Ars Moriendi – Kynstrið at doyggja. (About the poetry collection Gudahøvd by Jóanes Nielsen). ISBN 978-99972-1-318-1

== Recognition ==
- 1994 Faroese Literature Prize (Bókmentavirðisløn M.A. Jacobsens) for non-fiction
- 2006 Faroese Cultural Prize (Heiðursgáva landsins, DKK 75.000).
- 2011 Faroese Literature Prize (Bókmentavirðisløn M.A.Jacobsens) for his work at the Faroese publication house Mentunargrunnur Studentafelagsins by publishing Faroese books.
