= Oddfríður Marni Rasmussen =

Faroese writer, teacher and poet

Oddfríður Marni Rasmussen (born 22 February 1969 in Tórshavn, grew up in Sandur) is a Faroese author, poet, children's book author, editor and teacher. In 2000, 2009 and 2019 he received the Faroese Literature Prize, first for a collection of poems and later for his work as editor of the literary magazine Vencil. He is the younger brother of the composer Sunleif Rasmussen.
