= Bergtóra Hanusardóttir =

Faroese writer

Bergtóra Hanusardóttir (born 15 November 1946 in Tórshavn, Faroe Islands) is a Faroese writer and orthodontist.

== Biography ==
She is the daughter of Mia Trónd from Tórshavn and Hanus D. Jensen from the small island Skúvoy, and is the eldest of four sisters, the others being Rannvá, Svanna and Marjun. Her sister, Marjun Hanusardóttir, is the Permanent Secretary (director) of the Prime Minister's Office. Bergtóra has had two children with Bogi Hansen: composer Tróndur Bogason (1976), who is married to the well-known Faroese singer Eivør Pálsdóttir and Ragnheiður Bogadóttir (1979).

As a young woman, Bergtóra moved to Copenhagen in order to study dentistry. On finishing her studies in 1970, she trained as an orthodontist, finishing in 1975. She moved back to the Faroe Islands, where she was socially active in a number of ways, including sport (handball), working for equal rights for women, protesting against the EEC, and as a board member of the Women's Organization of Tórshavn (Kvinnufelagið í Havn). She has represented the Faroe Islands at international women's conferences around the world, i.e. in Beijing in 1995 and in New York City in 2000. She has her own clinic in Tórshavn.

She wrote pieces of various kinds for the women's magazine Kvinnutíðindi, where she was editor for some years, and published her first novel Skert flog in 1990. To date, she has published three novels. The third one, Burtur, aspublished in 1990. It is about young Faroese people studying in Denmark.

== Selected works ==
=== Novels ===
- Skert flog, 1990
- Suðar dýpið reyða, 1999
- Burtur, 2006

=== Short stories ===
- Loynigongir, collection of short stories, Mentunargrunnur Studentafelagsins, 108 pages, 1993
- Eisini kærleiki, published in Frostrósan, 1987
- Katrin, published in Frostrósan, 1987
- Várvindar, published in Kvinnutíðindi, 1988
- Bonsai, 2000

=== Plays ===
- Náttúra menniskjunar, 1984
- Heygbúgvin, 1991

=== Poems ===
- Songartíð, 2000

=== Published in Kvinnutíðindi ===
- Langomma, Kvinnutíðindi nr 1, 1984
- Tilkomin kvinna, Kvinnutíðindi nr 1, 1984
- Einsamøll mamma, Kvinnutíðindi nr 1, 1984
- Kvinna í starvi, Kvinnutíðindi nr 1, 1984
- Ung kvinna og Smágenta, Kvinnutíðindi nr 1, 1984
- Prose poems in the play Kvinnur, published in Kvinnutíðindi nr.1, 1984
