= Sólrún Michelsen =

Faroese writer and poet

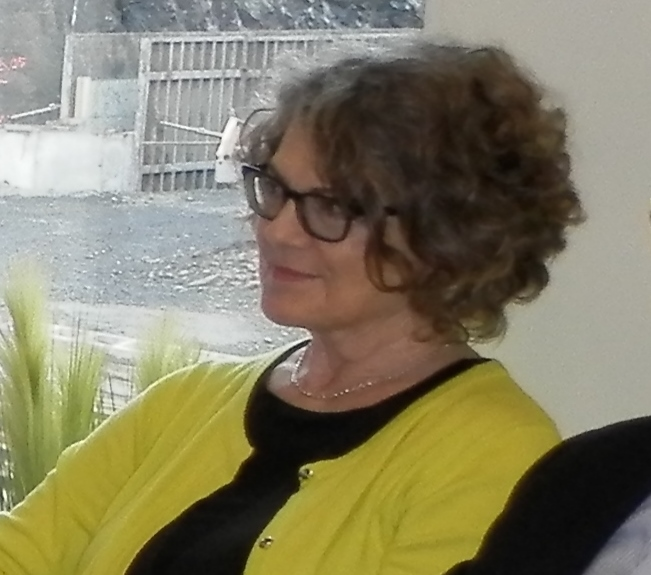
- Sólrún Michelsen in 2015
- Born: 11 March 1948 (age 78); Tórshavn;Faroe Islands
- Occupation: Poet
- Writing career
- Language: Faroese
- Genres: Children's Book, poetry
- Notable work: Loppugras

Sólrún Michelsen (born Midjord in Tórshavn on 11 March 1948), grew up in Argir and is a Faroese writer and poet. She received the Barnamentanarheiðursløn Tórshavnar býráðs (Tórshavn Council's Children's Book Prize) in 2002 and the Faroese Literature Prize in 2008. In 2004 she was nominated for the West Nordic Council's Children and Youth Literature Prize for the poem collection Loppugras. In 2015 she was nominated for the Nordic Literature Prize for the novel Hinumegin er mars.

She is married to the Faroese politician and business man Poul Michelsen, the leader of Framsókn (Progress).

== Bibliography ==
In 1994 she published her debut book which she named Argjafrensar. People who come from Argir (now a part of Tórshavn) are often jokingly referred to as Argjafrensar, which means "male cats from Argir". Her parents moved to Argir from elsewhere, her father from the small village of Hov on Suðuroy and her mother from Norðskáli on Eysturoy.

Since 2008 Sólrún has worked full-time as a writer. She has written and published in various genres, with her work appearing both in book form and in literary magazines like Birting and Vencil. Sólrún has written poems, short stories, novels and fantasy stories, and has written for children, youth and adults. Since 2006 she has mostly written for adults.

=== Literature for children and youth ===
- 1994 Argjafrensar - children's book, 146 pages
- 1996 Útiløgukattar (youth novel), 123 pages
- 2003 Loppugras (poems for children)
- 2006 "Óvitar" - ghost story, published in a youth book about ghosts: Spøkilsið sum flenti (The laughing ghost)
- 2013 Torkils Døtur (children's book)
- 2025 "Sjókæti" (children´s book) (The White Ravens 2025)

=== Fantasy ===
- 1999 Hin útvaldi (fantasy)
- 2002 Geislasteinar (fantasy)

=== Short stories ===
- 1995 "Øðrvísi stuttsøga" - published in Birting
- 2000 "Maya" (novella) - published in Birting
- 2002 "Angi av deyða" - published in Birting
- 2004 "Maðurin úr Grauballe" - published in Birting
- 2006 "Summi renna í stuttum brókum" - published in Vencil 1
- 2007 "Gjøgnum skygnið" - published in Vencil 3
- 2009 "Hin blái eingilin" - published in Vencil 6
- 2011 Rottan (short story collection)
- 2018 Morgunfrúa (short story collection)
- 2021 "Olivin"- published in Varðin 2021
- 2022 "Sunnumorgun" published in Varðin 2022

=== Novels ===
- 2007 Tema við slankum
- 2013 Hinumegin er mars
- 2019 Ein táttur er silvur
- 2020 Ein annar er gull
- 2021 Fáur fær tráðin heilt slættan
- 2021 Nornan spinnur (triologi)
- 2023 Sára Malena

=== Poems ===
- 1998 "Mítt gamla land" - published in Birting
- 2000 "Oyggjarnar" (Cantate)
- 2003 "Við vindeygað" - Birting
- 2009 "Kantatusálmur" -published in Vencil 7
- 2009 Í opnu hurðini (poetry collection)
- 2016 Ein farri av fráferð (poetry collection)

=== Published in Mín jólabók and Vencil ===
- 1992 "Jól hjá Onnu og Jákupi" – Published in Mín jólabók (My Christmas Book)
- 1997 "Emma" – Published in Mín jólabók
- 1998 "Tann fyrsta flykran" and Eg kenni eina vættur - published in Mín jólabók
- 1999 "Barnajól" and "Magga" - published in Mín jólabók
- 2000 "Gásasteggin" and "Postboð" - published in Mín jólabók
- 2001 "Fuglakongurin" and "Hinumegin vindeyga" - published in Mín jólabók
- 2003 "Tann fyrsta flykran fall í dag" and "Ein dag eg lá á bønum" - published in Mín jólabók
- 2005 "Sápubløðran" - published in Mín jólabók
- 2006 "Summi renna í stuttum brókum" - published in Vencil 1
- 2007 "Jólagávan" - published in Mín jólabók

=== In Danish translation ===
- 2009 At danse med virkeligheden (translation by Kirsten brix of Tema við slankum)
- 2017 På den anden side er marts (translation by Kirsten Brix of Hinumegin er mars)

In Norwegian Translation

- 2017 Sprinkeljenta (translation by Anne-Kari Skarðhamarof of At danse med virkeligheden)
- 2017 På den andre sida er mars (translation by Lars Moa of Hinumegin er mars)

=== In English Translation ===
- 2011 "Some people run in shorts" (translation by Marita Thomsen of the short story "Summi renna í stuttum brókum"), published in Vencil Anthology of Contemporary Faroese Literature.
- 2017 "Some people run in shorts" translation by Marita Thomsen in Anthology for contemporary Nordic Literature:THE DARK BLUE WINTER OVERCOAT
- 2017 "Some people run in shorts" translation by Marita Thomsen in Boundless Literary Magazine on-line
- 2014 "The Rat" (Translation of the short story "Rottan") published in Pankmagazine.com
- 2018 "The Summer with Halla" (translation by Kerri Pierce of the short story "Summarið við Hallu")published in World Literature Today
- 2018 "Starlings" (translation by Kerri Pierce of the short story "Starar," published in EUROPENOWJOURNAL.org
- 2023 "On the other Side is March" (novel translated by Marita Thomsen from faroese "Hinumegin er mars"

=== In German Translation ===
- 2013 "Der blaue Engel" (German translation of the short story "Hin blái eingilin" published in the collection Mord unterm Nordlicht s. 85-88)
- 2014 "Manche laufen in kurzen Hosen" (German translation of the short story "Summi renna í stuttum brókum," published in the collection Narrenflieger)
- 2015 "Tanz auf den Klippen" (German translation of "Tema við slankum," translated by Inga Meincke)
- 2018 "Die Liebe" (German translation of the short story "Kærleikin," translated by Karen Hertlein.) Published in Neue Nordische Novellen VI

In Ethiopian (Amharic) Translation

- 2024 Hinumegin er mars

In Greece translation

- 2025 Hinumegin er mars

== Honours ==
- 2002 Barnamentanarheiðursløn Tórshavnar býráðs
- 2004 Nominated West Nordic Council's Children and Youth Literature Prize for Loppugras
- 2008 Faroese Literature Prize (Mentanarvirðisløn M. A. Jacobsens)
- 2015 Nominated the Nordic Council's Literature Prize
