= Jóanes Nielsen =

Faroese author and poet

Jóanes Nielsen (born 5 April 1953 in Tórshavn) is a Faroese author and poet of the 1980s generation.

Nielsen has written short stories, plays and novels. He has published seven collections of poetry, and was nominated for the Nordic Council's Literature Prize for the fourth time with his latest collection of poems, entitled Brúgvar av svongum orðum (Bridges of Hungry Words). One of his main influences is the writer William Heinesen, who features in some of his poems.

As a writer Nielsen is mainly associated with a political and often existential message. He has been nominated for the Nordic Council's Literature Prize five times: 1988, 1994, 1999, 2004 and 2012.

In December 2012 the international publication house Random House made a contract with Nielsen to publish his novel Brahmadellarnir, which was first to be published in German. The Random House contract was regarded as an historic event for Faroese literature, because no other Faroese author's work had until then been published by such a large publishing house.

== Published work ==
- 1978: Trettandi mánaðin (poems).
- 1984: Pinnabrenni til sosialismuna (poems).
- 1985: Tjøraðu plankarnir stevna inn í dreymin (poems).
- 1986: Á landamørkum vaksa blomstur (short stories).
- 1987: Naglar í jarðarinnar hús (poems).
- 1991: Gummistivlarnir eru tær einastu tempulsúlurnar sum vit eiga í Føroyum (novel).
- 1993: Kirkjurnar á havsins botni (poems).
- 1994: Undergroundting (essays, articles).
- 1999: Undergroundting 2 (essays)
- 1998: Pentur (poems)
- 1999: Undergroundting 2 (essays).
- 2002: Eitur nakað land week-end? (play)
- 2005: Glansbílætasamlararnir (novel).
- 2007: Tey eru, sum taka mánalýsi í álvara (poems).
- 2009: Aftaná undrið (play)
- 2011: Brahmadellarnir (novel)
- 2012: Tapet millum øldir (poems)
- 2022: 1/2 máni 1/2 sól (novel)

=== Translated into Danish ===
- 2016 – Tapet mellem århundreder (poetry) (May 2016)
- 2012 – Brahmadellerne – en nordatlantisk krønike (novel) (October 2012)
- 2011 – Der findes dem der tager måneskin alvorligt (poetry)
- 2010 – Broer af sultne ord (poetry)
- 2008 – Glansbilledsamlerne (novel) ISBN 978-87-92286-04-8
- 2005 – Hedder noget land weekend? : skuespil i syv afsnit (play) ISBN 87-7865-562-5
- 1999 – Sting (poems) ISBN 87-7456-598-2
- 1994 – Kirkerne på havets bund (poetry) ISBN 87-7456-490-0
- 1992 – Gummistøvlerne er de eneste tempelsøjler vi ejer på Færøerne (novel) ISBN 87-7456-460-9
- 1988 – Saltet i dampende middagsgryder (poetry) ISBN 87-7456-351-3

=== Translated into Norwegian ===
- 2009 – Glansbildesamlarane (roman) ISBN 978-82-8177-015-7
- 2008 – Det fins dei som tar månelys på alvor (digte) ISBN 978-82-8104-062-5
- 2007 – Frå alle kantar ber vinden med seg ord og plantar og teikn (digte i udvalg) ISBN 978-82-521-7115-0
- 2004 – Bruer av svoltne ord (digte) ISBN 978-82-521-7115-0
- 2003 – Sting (digte) ISBN 82-8104-007-6

=== Translated into German ===
- Contributed to the first ever Faroese/German anthology “From Janus Djurhuus to Tóroddur Poulsen – Faroese Poetry during 100 Years”, academic advice: Turið Sigurðardóttir, lineartranslation: Inga Meincke (2007), edited by Paul Alfred Kleinert.
- 2016 - Die Erinnerungen (novel) (orig. Brahmadellarnir), translated from Danish by Ulrich Sonnenberg, btb Verlag (Randomhouse)

== Honour ==
- 1984 – Faroese Literature Prize (Mentanarvirðisløn M. A. Jacobsens)
- 2002 – Winner of the Nordic Drama Award for Eitur nakað land week-end ?.
- 2011 – Mentanarvirðisløn Landsins (Faroese Cultural Award) (150.000 DKK)
- 2012 – Faroese Literature Prize (Mentanarvirðisløn M. A. Jacobsens) for his novel Brahmadellarnir from 2011 (35.000 DKK).
- 2012 - Brahmadellarnir was nominated for the Nordic Council's Literature Prize 2013
- 2012 - He was the first Faroese author to make a contract with one of the world's largest publication houses, Random House.
