= Paul Alfred Kleinert =

German writer, editor and translator (born 1960)

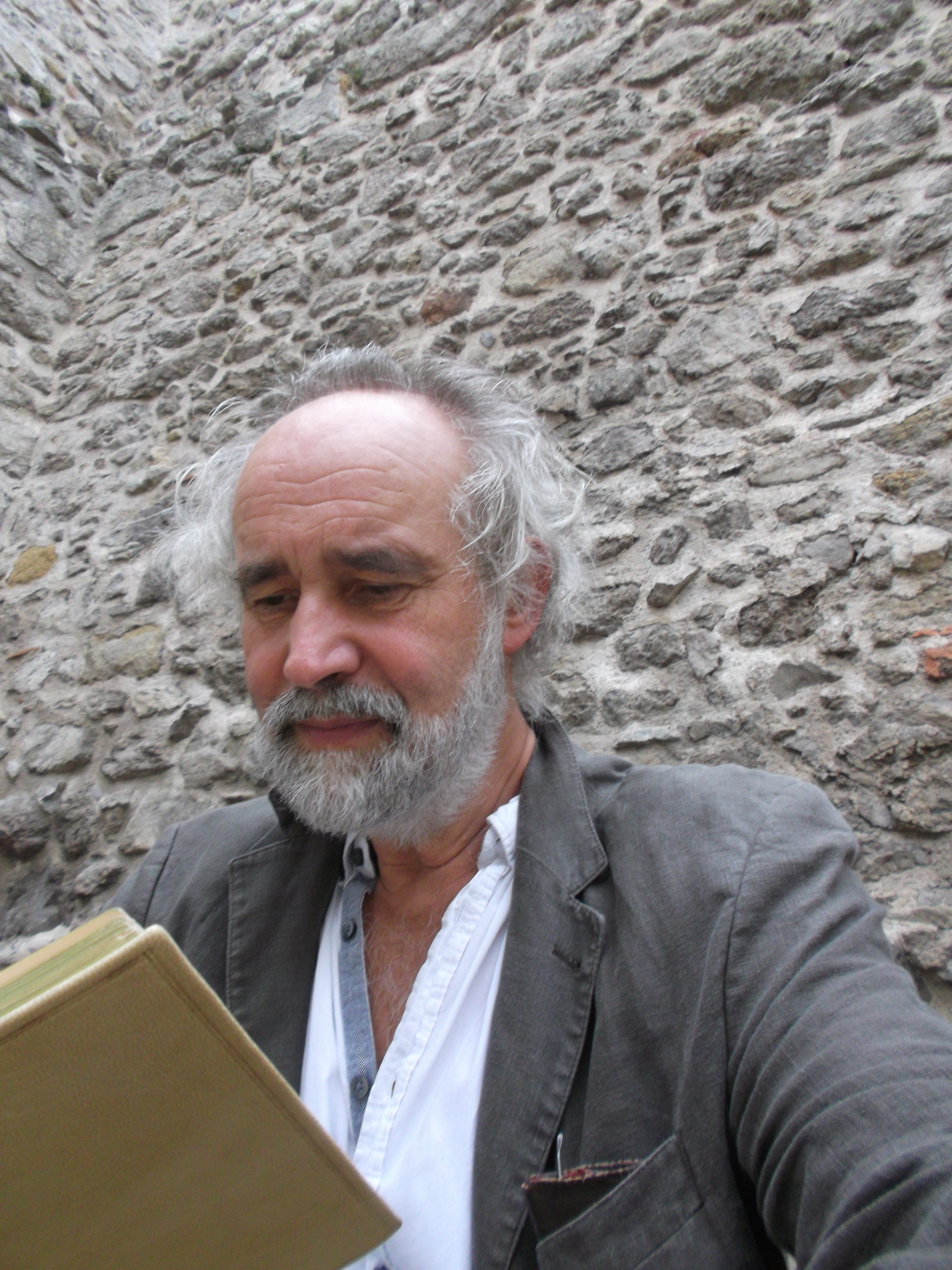
Kleinert in 2017

Paul Alfred Kleinert (born 24 February 1960) is a German writer, editor and translator.

== Biography ==
Kleinert was born in Leipzig in 1960 with family roots in Silesia and Gdańsk. He studied theology and did theological and celtic studies in East Berlin at Humboldt Universität zu Berlin (HU Berlin) and West Berlin at Freie Universität Berlin (Free University of Berlin, FU Berlin), Edinburgh at the University of Edinburgh and Dublin. His main areas of interest are poetry, short stories and translation from classical languages. He has lived and worked in Kreuzberg in Berlin since 1986.

== Publications ==
43 editions since 1994, i.a.:

- “Zeitzeichen” (1999-2009)
- “Die Nessing’schen Hefte” (2003-2005)
- “Nordische Reihe” (since 2006) in “pernobilis-edition” Leipzig (since 2007)]
- First ever volume of Faroese/German poetry by Guðrið Helmsdal "Stjørnuakrar /Sternenfelder", translation by A.Nielsen (2006)
- First ever Faroese/German anthology “From Janus Djurhuus to Tóroddur Poulsen – Faroese Poetry during 100 Years”, academic advice: Turið Sigurðardóttir, lineartranslation: Inga Meincke (2007).

== Appreciation ==
- grant by Otto Benecke Stiftung Bonn (1986/1987)
- Scholarship by Studienwerk Villigst (1987–1993)
- Working Grant by NGDK Berlin (1997, 1998, 2005, 2006)
- Travelling Grant (Ireland) by Berliner Senat (1998)
- Travelling Grant (Shetland-Isles) by LBV Vienna, (2002)
- "Writer in Residence" at Baltic Centre for Writers and Translators in Visby/Gotland/Sweden (2006)
- Travelling Grant (Sweden/Finland) by LBV Vienna (2007)
- Alfred-Müller-Felsenburg-Prize 2009 (together with Sándor Tatár, Budapest/Törökbálint)
- "Writer in Residence" at Künstlerhaus Salzwedel (2010, 2011 and 2015)
- Travelling Grant (Milan) by JTHBV Vienna (2012)
- "Writer in Residence" at Ventspils House for Writers and Translators in Ventspils/Latvia (2014)
- Travelling Grant (Sweden) by JTHBV Vienna (2015)
- Government Grant (Poland) by Kulturverwaltung des Landes Berlin (2016)
- Travelling Grant (German Baltic Sea) by JTHBV Vienna (2017)
- Travelling Grant (Norway) by LBVF Vienna (2018)
- "Writer in Residence" at Künstlerhaus Salzwedel (2020, 2024, 2025 and 2026)

== Books ==
- "Eine Gedankengeschichte" (lyrical prose, Berlin 1988)
- "Übergangszeit" (poetry, Berlin 1991, 2 editions, together with D. Pfannek am Brunnen and L. Nitzsche-Kornel)
- "Gedichte" (poetry, Vienna/Berlin 1992)
- "Lebensmitte" (poetry, Hamburg 1996).
- "Einträge in's Dasein" (poetry, Aschersleben 1999, ISBN 3-9807111-0-2)
- "Fähren und Fährten" (poetry, Vienna 2001).
- "Lust und Last" (poetry, Berlin 2003)
- "manchmal/olykor" (poetry, German/Hungarian, translation by S. Tatár, Budapest/Vienna 2008, ISBN 978-963-446-468-6)
- "und wieder an Inseln gewiesen" (poetry, Vienna/Leipzig 2008, ISBN 978-3-86703-748-8)
- "Rabensaat/Hollóvetés" (poetry, Berlin 2009, together with Tatár Sándor, lithographs by Volker Scharnefsky, Scharnefsky artist book)
- "um die fünfzig – koło pięćdziesiątki – ötven felé" (poetry with translations into Polish and Hungarian by M. Jakubów and S. Tatár, Budapest 2010, ISBN 978-963-446-558-4)
- "vestigium hominis – ein Jahres- im Lebenskreis" (poetry, Vienna 2012)
- "unterwegs" (poetry, Vienna 2015)
- "in nuce" (poetry, Berlin 2020, graphic arts by Antonia Stoyke, artist book of the Weißensee Academy of Art Berlin)
- "fraglich" (poetry, Vienna 2020)
- "Ersatz, nicht die Landschaft meines Herzens". Ein "österreichischer Schriftsteller" im Brandenburgischen - Franz Fühmann in Märkisch Buchholz (documentation, Frankfurt/Oder and Berlin 2022), ISBN 978-3-938008-76-8 and 978-3-96982-032-2
- "Zur Neugewinnung alter Erzählstoffe. Das Filmszenarium "Der Nibelunge Not" von Franz Fühmann and Franz Fühmanns Entwurf für einen Film zu Walther von der Vogelweide." In: Filmwelten Franz Fühmanns, edited by Paul Alfred Kleinert, Leipzig and Berlin 2022, ISBN 978-3-96940-278-8
- "Spætlese" (poetry, Vienna 2025, artist book)
- "Am Ausgang" (poetry, Vienna 2025, artist book)
- "AM AUSGANG – EINE SPÆTLESE" (poetry, Vienna 2026, artist book)

Some poems and one short story have been translated into Polish, Russian, English, French, Hungarian, Czech, Bulgarian and Latvian and have been published in anthologies in those countries.

== References and external links ==
- Literature by and about Paul Alfred Kleinert in the German National Library catalogue Books by Paul Alfred Kleinert in the German National Bibliography ("Deutsche Nationalbibliothek")
- Literature by and about Paul Alfred Kleinert in the catalogue of the Austrian National Library
- Literature by and about Paul Alfred Kleinert in the catalogue of the Wienbibliothek im Rathaus (Library of Vienna in the city hall)
- Literature by and about Paul Alfred Kleinert in the catalogue of the British Library
- Literature by and about Paul Alfred Kleinert in the catalogue of the National Library of Scotland
- "Kürschners Deutscher Literaturkalender" first in 1998
- "Deutsches Autorenlexikon" first in 2000
- "Deutsches Literatur-Lexikon. Das 20. Jahrhundert" (vol. 28), ed. by Lutz Hagestedt , Berlin and Boston 2017
- www.lyrikwelt.com /archive data backup
- http://www.literaturport.de/Paul-Alfred.Kleinert/

translation by Dr. Aaron von Lifschitz, Wien, publisher (Leopold Brachmann Verlag)
