= Marianna Debes Dahl =

Faroese writer

- Born: 24 November 1947 (age 78) Vestmanna, Faroe Islands, Denmark
- Occupation: Teacher, writer
- Notable awards: Barnamentanarheiðursløn Tórshavnar býráðs 1978 Burtur á heiði

Marianna Debes Dahl (born 24 November 1947) is a Faroese writer. She was born in 1947 in Vestmanna and grew up in Tórshavn. She trained as a school teacher in 1975 and worked in that capacity for some years, but now is a full-time writer; she has also prepared broadcasting material for Faroese radio (Kringvarp Føroya). She was the president for the Association of Writers of the Faroe Islands from 1980 to 1981, being the first woman to hold this post. She was also the first woman to write an autobiography in Faroese, which she published as Úti á leysum oyggjum (Out on loose islands) in 1997.

== Bibliography ==
She has worked in a number of different genres. Since her debut in 1975 she has written books for small children, children, youth and adults. She has written short stories, novels, travelogues, plays, and translations. Her first book was the children's book Burtur á heiði, which she wrote for a competition and won. In 1978 she received the Barnamentanarheiðursløn Tórshavnar býráðs, a cultural prize of Tórshavn City Council bestowed for material written for children and awarded annually in September since 1976.

=== Novels ===
- Lokkalogi, Forlagið Fannir, 1984
- Onglalag, 1986
- Faldalín, 1988
- Vívil, 1992

=== Autobiographies ===
- Úti á leysum oyggjum, 1997

=== Short stories ===
- "Millumleikur", 1978
- "Fløkjan", 1978
- "Lepar", 1980
- "Síðsta skúlaárið", 1980

=== Children's books ===
- Burtur á heiði, 1975
- Dirdri, 1979
- Skilnaður, 1981

=== Books for small children ===
- Bjarta og snigilin, 1983
- Døgg er dottin, 1984
- Hanna og Hóri, 1984
- Hóri letur upp, 1986
- Sturli súkklar, 1985
- Alvi er og ferðast, 1986
- Tunnuflakin, 1990

=== Picture books ===
- Sonurin, 1990 (La Filo in Esperanto)

=== Books for teaching in the Faroese language for children ===
- Ása fer í skúla, 1983

=== Travelogues ===
- Latið altíð sólina skína, 1982

=== Plays ===
- Skálatoftir, 1979 (written together with J.S. Hansen)
- Bardagabørn, 1990

=== Translations ===
- Uppreisnin, 1982, stories from South Africa

=== Translated and edited radio plays for Kringvarp Føroya's radio ===
- Victor (about the singer Jara from Chile)
- Monir (from Iran)
- Chico Mendes (from Brazil)
- Miriam Makeba (from South Africa)
- Menn undir sól (from Palestine)
- Zosia (stories from the Soviet Union from the World War II)
- Tað langa brævið (from Senegal)
- Edith Piaf (from France)

== Awards ==
- 1978 — Barnamentanarheiðursløn Tórshavnar býráðs
