= Oddvør Johansen =

Faroese writer and organ player

Oddvør Johansen (born 30 October 1941 in Tórshavn) is a Faroese writer and organ player in Tórshavn Cathedral. She writes novels, short stories and children's books.

She has twice received the Faroese Literature Prize, in 1983 and 2002. In 1988 she was awarded with Tórshavn City Council's Children's Book Prize (Barnabókavirðisløn Tórshavnar Býráðs). In 2001 her novel Í morgin er aftur ein dagur was nominated for the Nordic Council's Literature Prize.

== Bibliography ==
- 1982 – Lívsins summar (novel, Faroese Literature Prize, 1983)
  - 1985 – Danish: Livets sommer
  - 1985 – Swedish: Livets sommar
- 1983 – Hundalív í Grindavági (children's book)
- 1988 – Skip í eygsjón (children's book, illustrated by Olivur við Neyst, Barnamentanarheiðursløn Tórshavnar býráðs in 1988)
- 1990 – Bella Katrina (short story)
- 1993 – Ein mamma er ein mamma (novel)
- 1995 – Á káta horninum (short story)
- 1998 – Í morgin er aftur ein dagur (novel, nominated for the Nordic Council's Literature Prize in 2001)
  - I morgen er der atter en dag (translated by Ebba Hentze). The book has not been published in Danish yet.
- 2001 – Tá ið eg havi málað summarhúsið (novel, Faroese Literature Prize, 2002)
- 2004 – Sebastians hús (novel)
  - 2005 – Icelandic: Sebastianshús
- 2006 – Úr køksvindeyganum (essays and short stories)
- 2015 – Svanarnir syngja (short stories, essays and memoirs)

== Recognition ==
- 1983 Faroese Literature Prize (Mentanarvirðisløn M. A. Jacobsens) for her novel Lívsins Summar.
- 1988 Barnamentanarheiðursløn Tórshavnar býráðs for her children's book Skip í eygsjón
- 2001 Nominated for the Nordic Council's Literature Prize for her novel Í morgin er aftur ein dagur
- 2002 Faroese Literature Prize (Mentanarvirðisløn M. A. Jacobsens) for her novel Tá ið eg havi málað summarhúsið.
