= Turið Sigurðardóttir =

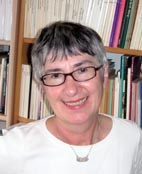
Turið Sigurðardóttir

Turið Sigurðardóttir (born 12 August 1946) is a Faroese educator, writer and translator, specializing in the history of Faroese literature. She lives in Tórshavn and teaches at the University of the Faroe Islands.

== Biography ==
Born in Copenhagen, Sigurðardóttir is the daughter of Sigrið av Skarði, a feminist journalist and academic, and of Sigurð Joensen, a lawyer who campaigned for the independence of the Faroe Islands. She graduated in Icelandic language and literature at the University of Iceland in Reykjavik and has a master's degree in literature from Copenhagen University.

At the University of the Faroe Islands, she taught literature and translation and conducted research into the history of Faroese literature, including children's literature and poetry. She retired in 2017. She contributes to various academic bodies such as the Faroese Language Board and is a member of the jury for the Nordic Council's Literature Prize. From 1989 to 1991, she served as president of the Association of Writers of the Faroe Islands. Sigurðardóttir has published books and articles on Faroese authors and the literary history of the Faroe Islands as well as an Icelandic manual in Faroese. She has collaborated in editing a Norwegian anthology of Faroese short stories. She has also translated books into Faroese from Icelandic, Swedish and English, including works by Halldór Laxness and Astrid Lindgren and had the academic advice of the first ever Faroese/German anthology “From Janus Djurhuus to Tóroddur Poulsen – Faroese Poetry during 100 Years” in 2007. One of her most extensive publications is the complete works of the Faroese author Símun av Skarði in seven volumes.

Turið Sigurðardóttir has managed the publishing house Ungu Føroyar since the 1990s, established by her mother, Sigrið av Skarði Joensen, in 1949. She continues to publish books in Faroese, both translated and original ones. Her focus has been books for children and youth.

== Awards ==
In 2013, Turið Sigurðardóttir was awarded the Faroese Literature Prize for non-fiction literature.

== Selected works ==
- 2011: (in collaboration with Malan Marnersdóttir) Føroysk bókmentasøga (History of Faroese Literature), vol. I, 689 pages, NÁM, Tórshavn
- 2004: Bókmentasøgur. Greinasavn, Føroya Fróðskaparfelag (collection of articles on Faroese literature)
- 1998: Hugtøk í bókmentafrøði, Sprotin
- 1994: Sigert, Ungu Føroyar
- 1987: Lærið íslendskt 1. Mállæra, Føroya Skúlabókagrunnur (Icelandic manual and grammar)
- 1987: Lærið íslendskt 2. Tekstir og orðasavn, Føroya Skúlabókagrunnur (Icelandic manual, texts and vocabulary)
- 1987: Lærið íslendskt Ljóðband, Føroya Skúlabókagrunnur, (Icelandic manual: audio cassettes)
