= Nordic Council Children and Young People's Literature Prize =

Award

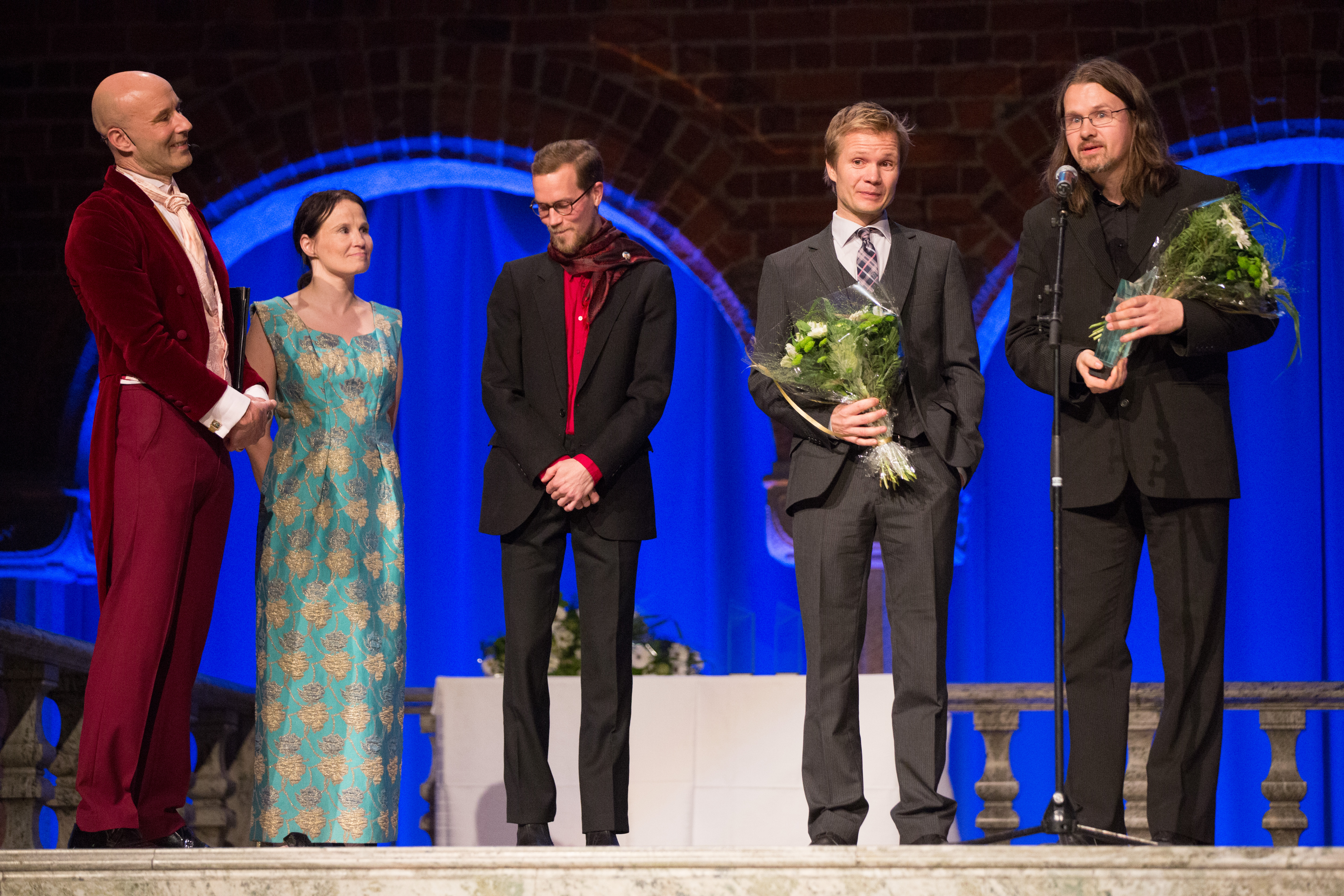
- Mark Levengood with 2013 winners Seita Vuorela and Jani Ikonen and 2014 winners Øyvind Torseter and Håkon Øvreås
- Awarded for: "a work of fiction for children and young people written in one of the Nordic languages by a living writer"
- Country: Nordic countries
- Presented by: Nordic Council
- Reward: DKK 300,000
- First award: 2013
- Website: https://www.norden.org/en/bulitpris

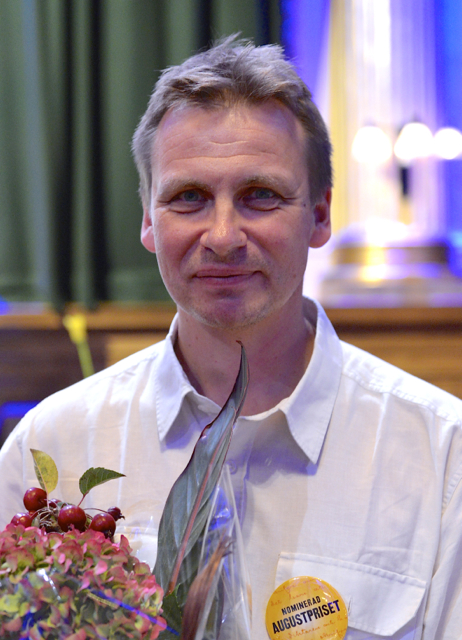
2015 winner Jakob Wegelius

The Nordic Council Children and Young People's Literature Prize is awarded for a work of children's or young adult literature written in one of the languages of the Nordic countries. It was established by the Nordic Council in 2012 after an initiative by ministers of culture in the Nordic countries. The prize was first awarded on 30 October 2013.

== Nomination and selection process ==
In each of the Nordic countries, there is a national adjudication committee which chooses nominations. The committee's members are selected by the Nordic Council of Ministers and each member must be an expert in their country's literature as well as other Nordic literature from other countries. The councils for Denmark, Iceland, Norway, and Sweden are made up of two main members and one deputy member, and they must nominate two works each. The council for Finland contains one member and one deputy member for each of the languages Finnish and Swedish, and the council must nominate one work in each language. The Sami, Greenlandic, Faroese, and Ålandic writers' associations may also submit one nomination per year.

The Nordic Adjudication Committee is made up of two ordinary members of each national adjudication committee and selects the winner based on the nominations. The award is given to new fiction written for children and young people that demonstrates good quality fiction and illustrations.

The prize is awarded during the annual autumn session of the Nordic Council. The recipient receives a monetary award.

During the fall session of the Nordic Council, the prize and kr. 300,000 are given to the winner. The Nordic House provides the prize money.

== Prize recipients ==
Year	Title	Author(s)	Illustrator	Country/Region	Ref.
2013	Karikko	Seita Vuorela	Jani Ikonen	Finland	
2014	Brune	Håkon Øvreås	Øyvind Torseter	Norway	
2015	Mördarens apa	Jakob Wegelius	—	Sweden	
2016	Sölvasaga unglings	Arnar Már Arngrímsson	—	Iceland	
2017	Djur som ingen sett utom vi	Ulf Stark	Linda Bondestam	Sweden	
2018	Træið	Bárður Oskarsson	—	Faroe Islands	
2019	Alle sammen teller	Kristin Roskifte	—	Norway	
2020	Vi är lajon!	Jens Mattsson	Jenny Lucander	Finland; Sweden	
2021	De afghanska sönerna	Elin Persson	—	Sweden	
2022	Ubesvart anrop	Nora Dåsnes	—	Norway	
2023	Eldgos	Rán Flygenring	—	Iceland	
2024	Den fantastiske bus	Jakob Martin Strid	—	Denmark	

== Nominated works ==
=== 2013 ===
- Denmark: Søndag by Kim Fupz Aakeson and Eva Eriksson (ill.); Biblia Pauperum Nova by Oscar K. and Dorte Karrebæk (ill.)
- Finland: Karikko by Seita Vuorela and Jani Ikonen (ill.); Allan och Udo by Minna Lindeberg and Linda Bondestam (ill.)
- Iceland: Skrímslaerjur by Áslaug Jónsdóttir (ill. and text), Kalle Güettler (text) and Rakel Helmsdal (text); Ólíver by Birgitta Sif
- Norway: Inn i elden by Aina Basso; Fallteknikk by Inga Sætre
- Sweden: Vita Streck och Öjvind by Sara Lundberg; Pojkarna by Jessica Schiefauer
- Faroe Islands: Skriva í sandin by Marjun Syderbø Kjelnæs
- Greenland: Hermelinen by Nuka K. Godtfredsen (ill.) and Martin Appelt
- Åland: Joels färger by Isela Valve
- Sami language area: Mánugánda ja Heike by Signe Iversen and Sissel Horndal (ill.)

=== 2014 ===
- Denmark: Halli! Hallo! Så er der nye firkantede historier by Louis Jensen and Lilian Brøgger (ill.); To af alting by Hanne Kvist
- Finland: Råttan Bettan och masken Baudelaire. Babypoesi och vilda ramsor by Annika Sandelin and Karoliina Pertamo (ill.); Vain pahaa unta by Ville Tietäväinen and Aino Tietäväinen
- Iceland: Tímakistan by Andri Snær Magnason; Stína stórasæng by Lani Yamamoto
- Norway: Krigen by Gro Dahle and Kaia Linnea Dahle Nyhus (ill.); Brune by Håkon Øvreås and Øyvind Torseter (ill.)
- Sweden: Olli och Mo by Eva Lindström; En sekund i taget by Sofia Nordin
- Faroe Islands: Flata kaninin by Bárður Oskarsson
- Greenland: Nasaq teqqialik piginnaanilik by Kathrine Rosing and Nina Spore Kreutzmann (ill.)
- Sami language area: Ilmmiid gaskkas by Máret Ánne Sara

=== 2015 ===
- Denmark: Ella er mit navn vil du købe det? Æske med løsblade og poetsne by Mette Hegnhøj; Ud med Knud by Jesper Wung-Sung
- Finland: Maresi. Krönikor från Röda klostret by Maria Turtschaninoff; Leonardo oikealta vasemmalle by Marjatta Levanto and Julia Vuori (ill.)
- Iceland: Maðurinn sem hataði börn by Þórarinn Leifsson; Vinur minn, vindurinn by Bergrún Íris Sævarsdóttir
- Norway: Joel og Io. En kjærlighetshistorie by Geir Gulliksen and Anna Fiske (ill.); De som ikke finnes by Simon Stranger
- Sweden: Jagger, Jagger by Frida Nilsson; Mördarens apa by Jakob Wegelius
- Faroe Islands: Åh, min kære mor! by Elin á Rógvi and Marjun Reginsdóttir
- Greenland: Aqipi – til sommerfest by Naja Rosing-Asvid
- Sami language area: Durrebjørnen og skuterløypa by Veikko Holmberg and Sissel Horndal (ill.)
- Åland: Alberta Ensten och uppfinnarkungen by Malin Klingenberg

=== 2016 ===
- Denmark: Magnolia af Skagerrak, Bent Haller and Lea Letén (ill.); Da Gud var dreng, Sankt Nielsen and Madam Karrebæk (ill.)
- Finland: Koira nimeltään Kissa, Tomi Kontio and Elina Warsta (ill.); Dröm om drakar, Sanna Tahvanainen and Jenny Lucander (ill.)
- Iceland: Koparborgin, Ragnhildur Hólmgeirsdóttir; Sölvasaga unglings, Arnar Már Arngrímsson
- Norway: Mulegutten, Øyvind Torseter; Krokodille i treet, Ragnar Aalbu
- Sweden: Ishavspirater, Frida Nilsson; Iggy 4-ever, Hanna Gustavsson
- Faroe Islands: Stríðið um tað góða grasið, Bárður Oskarsson
- Greenland: Aima qaa schhh!, Bolatta Silis Høegh
- Sami language area: Čerbmen Bizi – Girdipilohta, Marry Ailonieida Somby and Biret Máret Hætta (ill.)

=== 2017 ===
- Denmark: Dyr med pels - og uden, Hanne Kvist; Heartstorm – Stormheart, Annette Herzog, Katrine Clante (ill.), and Rasmus Bregnhøi (ill.)
- Finland: Vildare, värre Smilodon, Lindenberg Lucander and Jenny Lucander (ill.); Yökirja, Inka Nousiainen and Satu Kettunen (ill.)
- Iceland: Enginn sá hundinn, Hafsteinn Hafsteinsson; Úlfur og Edda: Dýrgripurinn, Kristín Ragna Gunnarsdóttir
- Norway: Far din, Bjørn Ingvaldsen; Ungdomsskolen, Anders Kvammen
- Sweden: Djur som ingen sett utom vi, Ulf Stark and Linda Bondestam; Ormbunkslandet, Elin Bengtsson
- Faroe Islands: Hon, sum róði eftir ælaboganum, Rakel Helmsdal
- Sami language area: Luohtojávrri oainnáhusat, Kirste Paltto

=== 2018 ===
- Denmark: Lynkineser, Jesper Wung-Sung and Rasmus Meisler (ill.); Hest Horse Pferd Cheval Love, Mette Vedsø
- Finland: Kurnivamahainen kissa, Magdalena Hai and Teemu Juhani (ill.); Pärlfiskaren, Karin Erlandsson
- Iceland: Vertu ósýnilegur – Flóttasaga Ishmaels, Kristín Helga Gunnarsdóttir; Skrímsli í vanda, Áslaug Jónsdóttir, Kalle Güettler, and Rakel Helmsdal
- Norway: Ingenting blir som før, Hans Petter Laberg; Alice og alt du ikke vet og godt er det, Torun Lian
- Sweden: Fågeln i mig flyger vart den vill, Sara Lundberg; Norra Latin, Sara Bergmark Elfgren
- Faroe Islands: Træið, Bárður Oskarsson
- Sami Language Area: Joekoen sjïehteles ryöjnesjæjja, Anne-Grethe Leine Bientie and Meerke Laimi Thomasson Vekterli (ill.)
- Åland: Pärlfiskaren, Karin Erlandsson

=== 2019 ===
- Denmark: Da Mumbo Jumbo blev kæmpestor, Jakob Martin Strid; Styrke, Cecilie Eken
- Finland: Breven från Maresi, Maria Turtschaninoff; Ruusun matka, Marika Maijala
- Iceland: Rotturnar, Ragnheiður Eyjólfsdóttir; Silfurlykillinn, Sigrún Eldjárn
- Norway: Alle sammen teller, Kristin Roskifte; Det var ikke en busk, Eli Hovdenak
- Sweden: Den förskräckliga historien om Lilla Hon, Lena Ollmark and Per Gustavsson (ill.); Risulven Risulven, Nina Ivarsson.
- Faroe Islands: Miljuløtur, Rakel Helmsdal and Kathrina Skarðsá (ill.)
- Greenland: Tuttuarannguaq, Camilla Sommer and Pernille Kreutzmann (ill.)
- Sami language area: Šiellaspeajal, Karen Anne Buljo
- Åland: På en trollsländas vingar, Ann-Christin Waller and Anni Wikberg (ill.)

=== 2020 ===
- Denmark: Ud af det blå, Rebecca Bach-Lauritsen and Anna Margrethe Kjærgaard (ill.); Min øjesten, Merete Pryds Helle and Helle Vibeke Jensen (ill.)
- Finland: Vi är Lajon!, Jens Mattsson and Jenny Lucander (ill.); Sorsa Aaltonen ja lentämisen oireet, Veera Salmi and Matti Pikkujämsä (ill.)
- Iceland: Villueyjar, Ragnhildur Hólmgeirsdóttir; Egill spámaður, Lani Yamamoto
- Norway: Draumar betyr ingenting, Ane Barmen; Når er jeg gammel nok til å skyte faren min?, Åse Ombustvedt and Marianne Gretteberg Engedal (ill.)
- Sweden: Hästpojkarna, Johan Ehn; Trettonde sommaren, Gabriella Sköldenberg
- Faroe Islands: Loftar tú mær?, Rakel Helmsdal
- Greenland: Orpilissat nunarsuarmi kusanarnersaat, Juaaka Lyberth and Maja-Lisa Kehlet (ill.)
- The Sami language area: Guovssu guovssahasat, Karen Anne Buljo and Inga-Wiktoria Påve (ill.)
- Åland: Segraren, Karin Erlandsson
