= Øyvind Torseter =

Norwegian artist, illustrator, comic book artist and writer

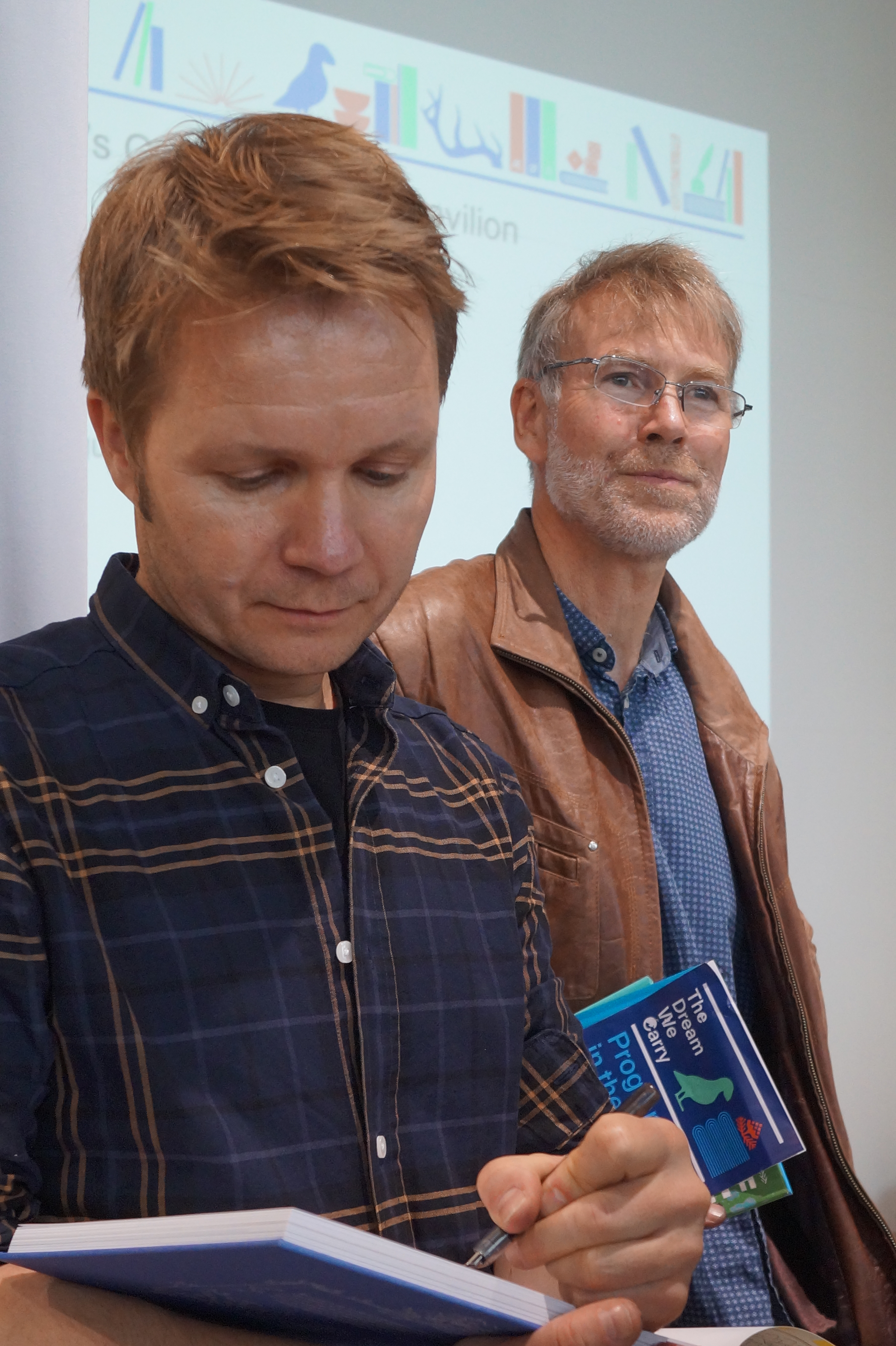
Øyvind Torseter at the Frankfurt Book Fair, 2019

Øyvind Torseter (born 2 October 1972) is a Norwegian artist, illustrator, comic book artist and write known for picture books, such as The Hole. Since he began publishing in the late 1990s, Torseter has been noted for visual storytelling. In 2014, he was a finalist in for the Hans Christian Andersen Award, the highest recognition for creators of children's books.

== Biography ==
Torseter studied illustration in Oslo at the Merkantilt Institutt [no] from 1991 to 1992, the Skolen for Grafisk Design [no] from 1992 to 1994, followed by the Kent Institute of Art and Design in Maidstone from 1995 to 1998. Since he illustrated his first picture book in 1999, Torseter has published a variety of children's literature as both illustrator and as both author and illustrator, including the prize-winning Klikk (2004). Torseter's stories are often surreal.

In 2002, Torseter published Mister Random, his first children's book as both writer and illustrator, featuring surreal characters including elephant men, octopuses, and superheroes, some depicted as humans in costume and others as fantastical human–animal hybrids. Some of these figures reappear in unofficial sequels, including Detours in 2007 and Connections in 2013. He typically starts by making pictures and then creates the story.

Torseter uses both analog and digital techniques for his illustrations and has been noted for his three-dimensional artwork from cut and folded paper, as well as his line drawings in ink. He stated "I draw directly on the paper, often using a fountain pen with carbon ink. I don't sketch first". His pictures have been recognized as more than simple illustrations of text, but as free drawings that play and provide details, stories, and opportunities for imagination. Torseter is one of Norway's foremost illustrators and artists.

Torseter credits cartoons as an influence on his career, as well as the Norwegian Folktales collection by Peter Christen Asbjørnsen and Jørgen Moe. He lives and works in Oslo.

== Books ==
As both writer and illustrator

- 2002: Mister Random
- 2004: On the road again, again
- 2004: Klikk
- 2005: For en neve havre
- 2007: Avstikkere (Detours)
- 2009: Gravenstein
- 2012: The Hole
- 2013: Connections

As illustrator

- 1999: Tor Arve Røssland: Pode – children's book
- 1999: Finn Øglænd: Vers på tvers. Dikt og tekster for barn
- 2000: Tor Arve Røssland: Pode mister fotfestet
- 2002: Tor Arve Røssland: Pode får snue
- 2002: Bjørn Sortland: Plutselig ville eg ikkje laga dorulldyr lenger
- 2006: Roald Kaldestad: Englefjell
- 2006: Tor Arve Røssland: Anti-Pode
- 2006: Bjørn Sortland: Den gongen eg liksom-døydde
- 2007: Radiorådet. Radiorådet : din redningsbøye på livets stormfulle hav
- 2008: Stein Erik Lunde: Eg kan ikkje sove no
- 2009: Jon Fosse: Spelejenta

== Literary and other prizes ==
- Kultur- og kirkedepartementets illustrasjonspris for barne- og ungdomslitteratur 1999, for Pode (author Tor Arve Røssland)
- Sproingprisen (Beste nykommer) 2004, for Samlivstrøbbel og sirkus (together with Bjørn Sortland)
- Kultur- og kirkedepartementets billedbokpris for barne- og ungdomslitteratur 2004, for Klikk
- Bologna Ragazzi Award 2008, for Avstikkere
- Kultur- og kirkedepartementets illustrasjonspris for barne- og ungdomslitteratur 2007, for Klar ferdig gå! (authors Beate Grimsrud and Inger Alfvén)
- Kirke- og undervisningsdepartementets billedbokpris 2008, for Eg kan ikkje sove no (together with Stein Erik Lunde)
