= Vuorela =

Vuorela is a Finnish surname. Notable people with the name include:

- Einari Vuorela (1899–1972), Finnish writer
- Ulla Vuorela (1945–2011), Finnish professor of social anthropology
- Seita Vuorela (1971–2015), Finnish author of young adult novels and photographer
