= Sara Lundberg =

Swedish author and illustrator (born 1971)

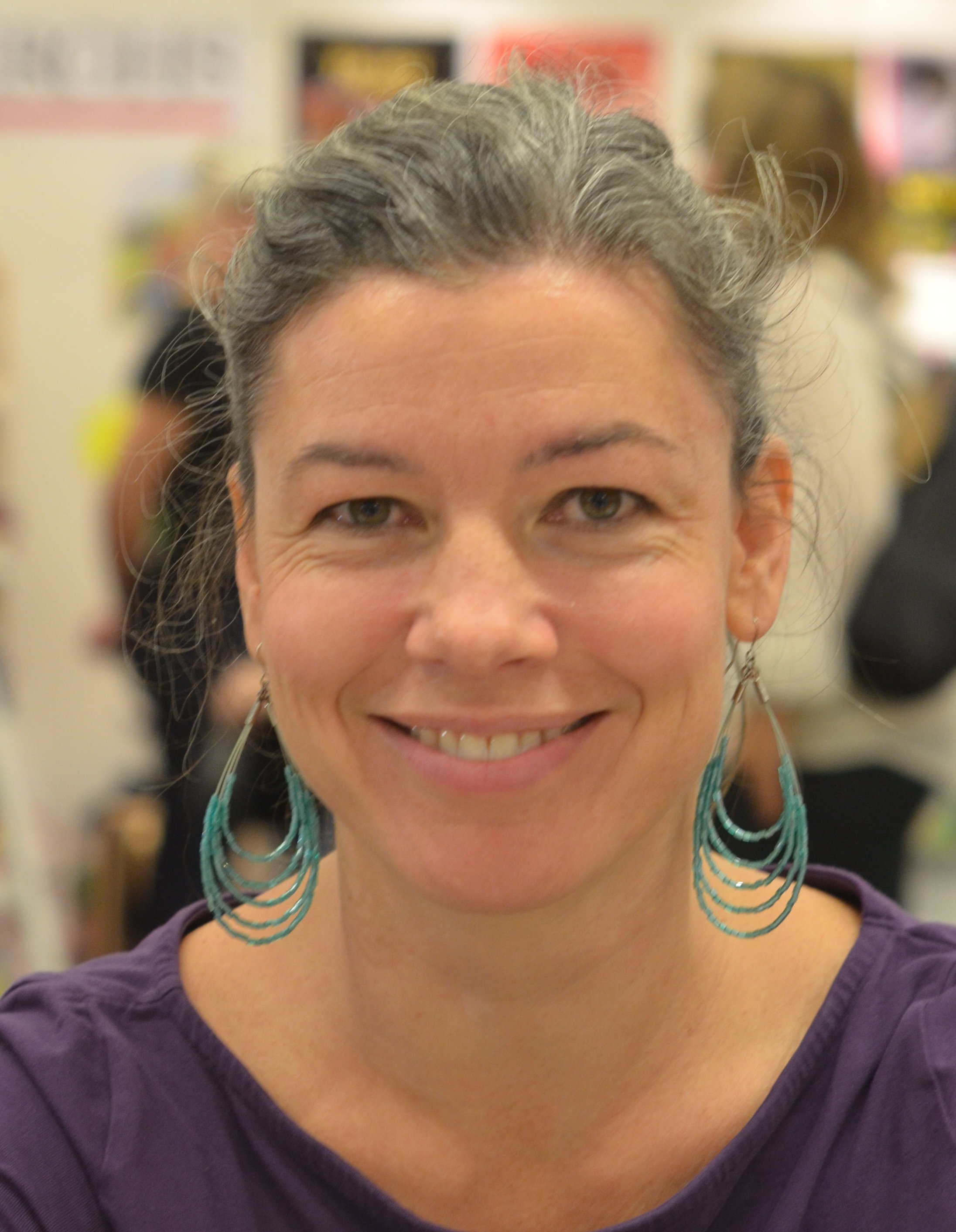
- Lundberg in 2013
- Born: 1971 (age 54–55)
- Occupations: Author; illustrator

Sara Lundberg (born 1971) is a Swedish author and illustrator.

== Biography ==
Sara Lundberg was educated at McDaniel College in Westminster, Maryland, where she earned a bachelor's degree in theatre and art in 1994, at Konstfack in Stockholm and at the Royal Institute of Art. She has been a member of the Swedish Academy for Children's Books.

In 2009, she won the August Prize for children's and young adult literature for the book Skriv om och om igen, together with Ylva Karlsson, Katarina Kuick and Lilian Bäckman. In the same year, she published the picture book Vita streck. Vita streck och Öjvind was nominated for the August Prize for children's and young adult literature in 2011, and she won the August Prize for children's and young adult literature in 2017 for Fågeln i mig flyger vart den vill.

== Works ==
- 2009 – Vita streck
- 2009 – Skriv om och om igen
- 2010 – Sommar
- 2011 – Emblas universum
- 2011 – Vita Streck och Öjvind
- 2013 – Öjvind och världens ände
- 2015 – Vita, Öjvind och Ingenting
- 2017 – Fågeln i mig flyger vart den vill
- 2019 – Dyksommar (with Sara Stridsberg)
- 2019 – Jag och alla (with Ylva Karlsson)
- 2021 – Glömdagen

=== Works in English ===
- Nobody but Me, Translator B.J. Woodstein, (Seven StoriesPress, 2026)
- The Bird Within Me Flies. Translator B.J. Woodstein, 2020,
- Summer of Diving, translator B.J. Woodstein (Seven StoriesPress, 2022)
- The Cat Way, Translated by B.J. Woodstein, (Eerdmans Books, 2024).

== Awards ==
- 2009 – August Prize
- 2012 – Elsa Beskow Plaque
- 2013 – Expressens Heffaklump
- 2017 – August Prize
- 2017 – Snöbollen - årets bilderbok
