= Anne-Grethe Leine Bientie =

Norwegian Sami writer

- Born: July 2, 1954 (age 72)
- Writing career
- Language: Norwegian

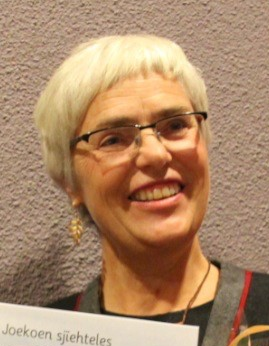
Bientie in 2014

Anne-Grethe Leine Bientie (born 2 July 1954) is a Norwegian writer and psalmist. She has worked extensively with South Sami church life and has written books and hymns in South Sami. She is married to the priest and psalmist Bierna Bientie.

Anne-Grethe Leine Bientie originally came from Bærum and learned southern Sami as an adult. She has written children's books and hymns in southern Sami, and is represented with two hymns in the Norwegian hymn book 2013. Her last book came in 2015 and is a book in southern Sami for distribution in the church's faith teaching work.

Together with illustrator Meerke Laimi Thomasson Vekterli, she published the children's book Joekoen sjïehteles ryöjnesjæjja in 2014. In 2018, the book was nominated for the Nordic Council Children and Young People's Literature Prize.

== Selected works ==
- Vadtese (2008)
- Lengselen er et følehorn / Mejtie sån sjædta? (2013)
- Joekoen sjïehteles ryöjnesjæjja (2014)
  - Norsk utgave En skikkelig flink liten reingjeter (2018)
- Mijjen gærhkoe-gærja – Vår kirkebok (2015)
