= Ane Barmen =

Ane Barmen (born 1984) is a Norwegian novelist.

She was originally from Vågsøy Municipality and attended Firda Upper Secondary School. In 2015 she won the writing contest "women's life in 2015" with a text about visiting the gynecologist.

She made her literary debut with Draumar betyr ingenting, a young adult fiction novel published by Gyldendal Norsk Forlag in 2019. The book earned her a Brage Prize for children's and young adult literature in 2019, and was also nominated for the Nordic Council Children and Young People's Literature Prize.

She followed with the novel Pappa var nesten på Woodstock (2021) and the children's book Tone! (2024), both on Gyldendal.

Awards
Preceded by Anna Fiske	Recipient of the Brage Prize for children's and young adult literature 2019	Succeeded by Jenny Jordahl
