= Aina Basso =

Norwegian historian and novelist

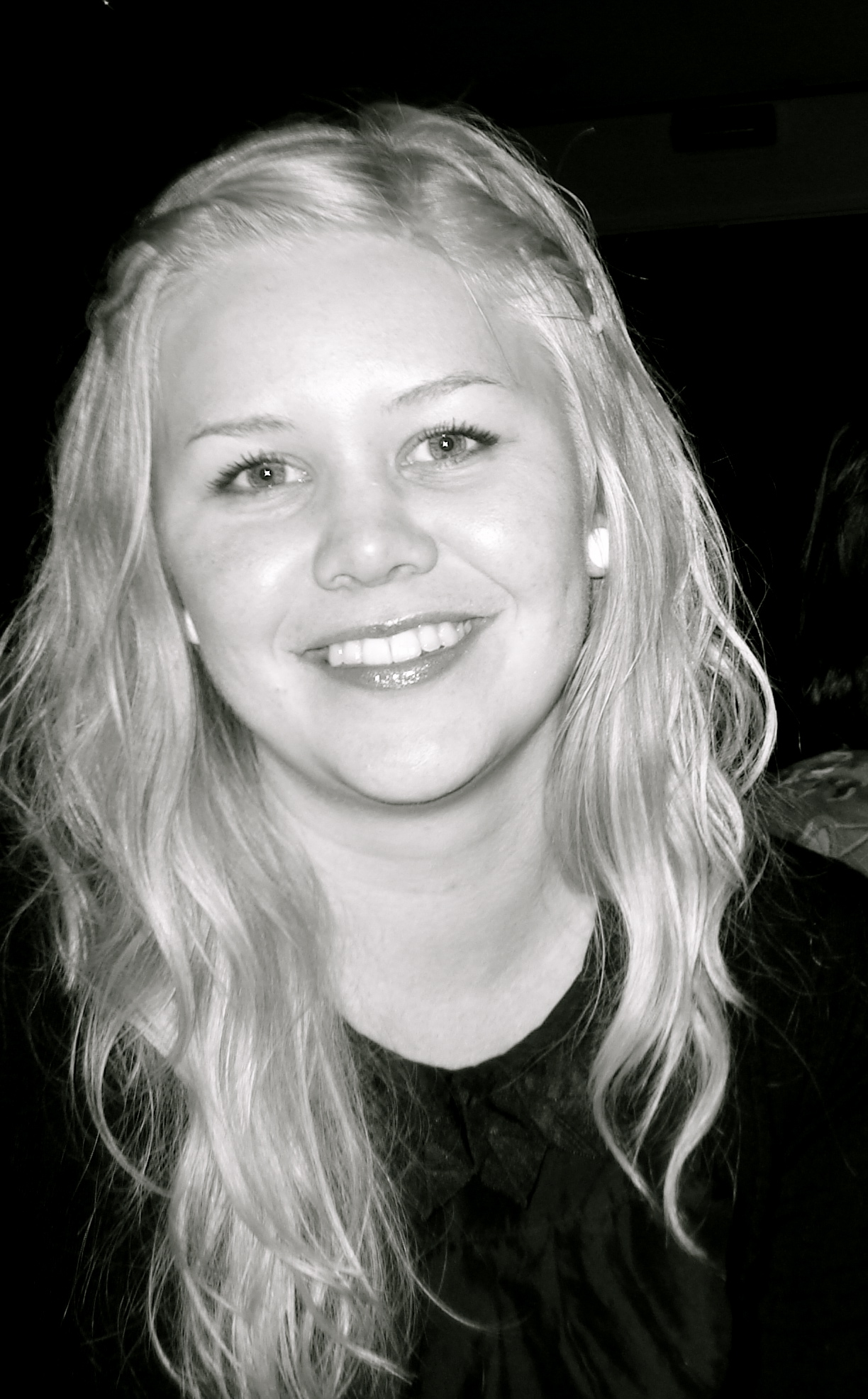
- Basso in 2009
- Born: 1979 (age 46–47)
- Occupations: historian and novelist

Aina Basso (born 1979) is a Norwegian historian and novelist. She made her literary debut in 2008 with the historical novel Ingen må vite. The novel Fange 59. Taterpige from 2010 is set in Trondheim in the 18th century. Her novel Inn i elden from 2012 treats the witch trials in Finnmark in the 17th century. The novel was well received and was nominated for the Nordic Council Children and Young People's Literature Prize in 2013.
