= Ylva Karlsson =

Swedish children's writer

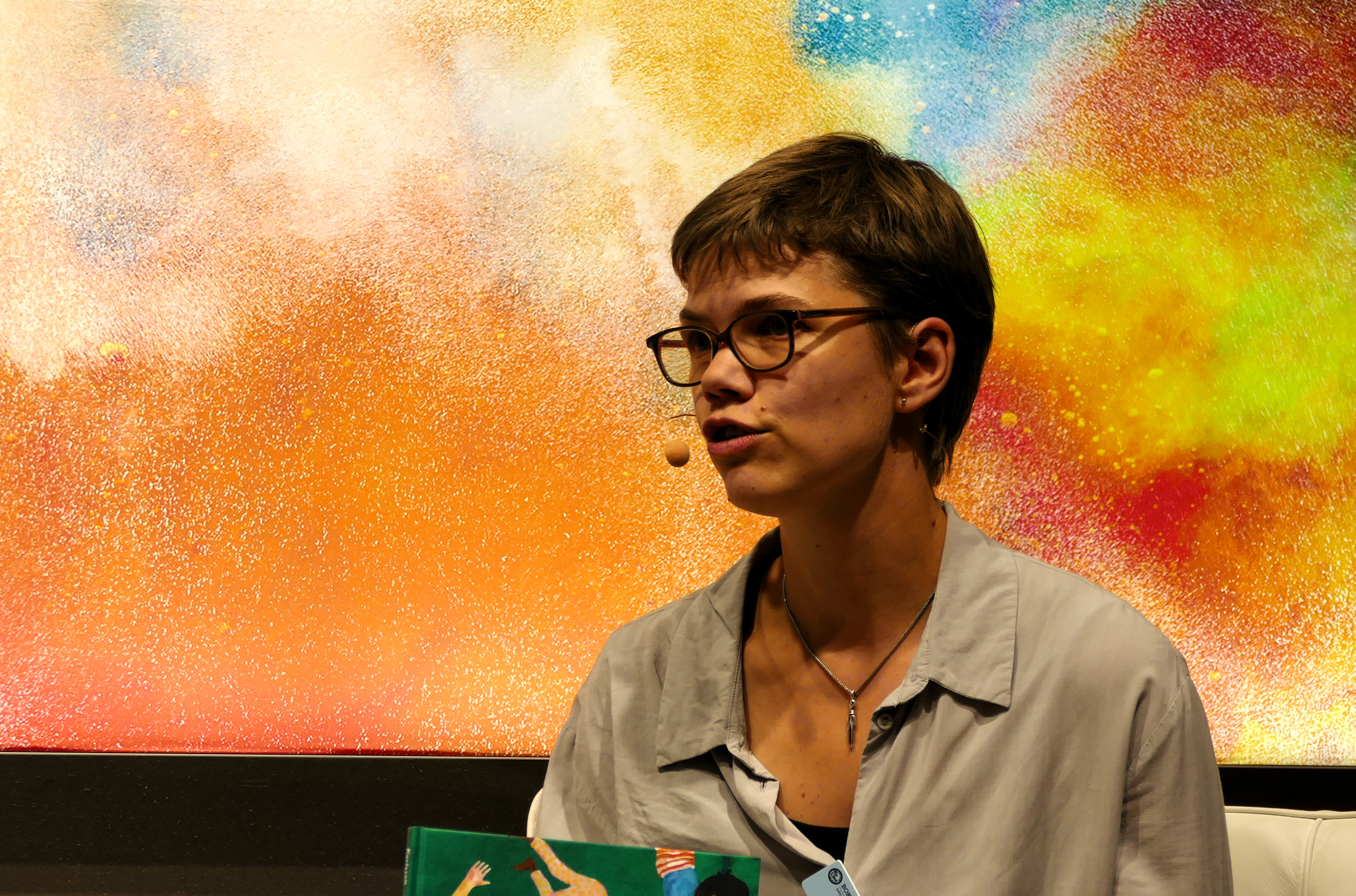
Ylva Karlsson in 2019

Ylva Karlsson (born 3 February 1978) is a Swedish children's writer. She received the Astrid Lindgren Prize in 2021. She was a member of the Swedish Academy for Children's Books from 2009 to 2012. She was born in Hallonbergen and now lives in Bagarmossen.

She made her literary debut at the age of 20 with the novel Tova, for which she received the Slangbellan prize. She wrote the book as an 18-year-old, and it depicts a 17-year-old girl's problem-filled summer, where she is let down by her mother and abandoned by her boyfriend. The trilogy about the eight-year-old Malin (2001-2003) is everyday realism, but she has also written art adventures and fantasy books. She was nominated to the Nordic Council Children and Young People's Literature Prize in 2021.

She holds a degree in literature from Stockholm University.

== Works ==
- Tova (Alfabeta, 1998)
- Josefin, Horisontvägen 29 (Alfabeta 2000)
- När mormor glömde att hon var död (Alfabeta 2001)
- En liten bok om Malin (Alfabeta 2001)
- Dit man längtar (Alfabeta 2001)
- Malins andra bok (Alfabeta 2002)
- Tredje boken om Malin (Alfabeta 2003)
- Resan till Kejsaren (Alfabeta 2004)
- Om man heter Robin (Alfabeta 2006)
- De röda drakarnas land (Alfabeta 2007)
- Skriv om och om igen (X Publishing 2009)
- Ossians ovanliga nanny (Hippo bokförlag 2012)
- Samuels sällsamma kalender (Hippo bokförlag 2013)
- Mikaels märkvärdiga resa (Hippo bokförlag 2015)
- Här är världen (Hippo bokförlag 2016)
- Vantarna - en julsaga (Urax förlag 2016)
- Den stora vännen (Urax förlag 2017)
- Nattstjärnorna (Urax förlag 2018)
- Jag och alla (Rabén & Sjögren 2019)
- Månen, varelsen och jag (Rabén & Sjögren 2020)
- Nappresan (Rabén & Sjögren 2020)
- Krokodiljakten eller när Ester kom bort i affären (Rabén & Sjögren 2021)

== Awards ==
- Slangbellan (1998)
- Expressens Heffaklump (2004)
- August Prize (2009)
- Astrid Lindgren Prize (2021)
