= Guðrið Helmsdal =

Faroese poet (born 1941)

Guðrið Helmsdal Nielsen (born 26 February 1941 in Tórshavn) is a Faroese poet. Born as Guðrið Helmsdal Poulsen, she added her husband's surname when she married. She writes as Guðrið Helmsdal.

== Biography ==
Born on 26 February 1941 in Tórshavn, Guðrið Helmsdal Nielsen spent the first 12 years of her life in the Faroe Islands, her parents being Annie Helmsdal and Hans Poulsen. When she was 12, the family moved to Denmark, where her father worked as a captain. She, her two sisters and her parents lived first in Tårnby, then in Amager, and later in Copenhagen. Guðrið returned to the Faroe Islands when she was 26 years old.

She began to write poems at the age of 13, and in 1958 she published her first poems in a Faroese paper for Faroese students in Denmark, called Oyggjaskeggi. In 1961, she published some poems in the Faroese literary magazine Varðin. Her first collection of poetry, Lýtt lot, which was published in 1963, was the first modern collection of poems in the Faroese language. The collection was also the first in Faroese written by a woman. Her second collection of poems, Morgun í mars, was published in 1971 and is written in two languages: Faroese and Danish.

In 1965, she married the Danish teacher and sculptor Ole Jakob Nielsen. They have one daughter, Rakel Helmsdal, who is also a writer, and one son, Gudmund Helmsdal, who is a movie director and camera man.

== Bibliography ==
=== Poems ===
- 1963 - Lýtt lot, illustrated by Zacharias Heinesen
- 1971 - Morgun í mars ("Morning in March")

=== Non-fiction ===
- 1979 - Føroyskur dansur og vertskapur í Leynum (About the Faroese chaindance in the village Leynar)

=== Published in other languages than Faroese ===
- Færøske digte 1900–1971. 1971. (Danish)
- Færøysk lyrikk. 1974. (Norwegian Nynorsk)
- Bränning och bleke. 1976. (Swedish)
- Regnbogastígur. 1981. (Icelandic)
- Rocky Shores. An Anthology of Faroese Poetry. Edited and translated by George Johnston. Wilfion Books, Paisley 1981. (English)
- Modern Scandinavian Poetry - The Panorama of Poetry 1900–1975 in Eight Northern Countries. 1982. (English)
- Stjørnuakrar – Sternenfelder. Edited by Paul Alfred Kleinert. Translated by Anette Nielsen, the frontpage is illustrated by Zacharias Heinesen. Halle/Saale (Projekte Verlag) 2006, ISBN 3-86634-076-1 (German).
- Frá Áarstovubrøðrunum til Tórodd - føroysk yrking í hundrað ár / Von Djurhuus bis Poulsen – färöische Dichtung aus 100 Jahren. Trilingual edition, edited by Paul Alfred Kleinert. Academic advice: Turið Sigurðardóttir, rough translations: Inga Meincke. In adaptations by Annemarie Bostroem, Günther Deicke and Paul Alfred Kleinert. Leipzig (pernobilis edition im Engelsdorfer Verlag), 2007, ISBN 978-3-86703-546-0
- Four poems in Structo, a literary magazine from the UK. Randi Ward has translated the poems from Faroese to Danish and English. The poem in the magazine are these: "Fjarðakvirra", “Morgunfjøll", "Heystfjøll" and "Solnedgang". (English)

== Prizes ==
- 1974 - Received the Faroese Literature Prize for the poetry collections Morgun í mars and Lýtt lot.
