= Lani Yamamoto =

Children's author (born 1965)

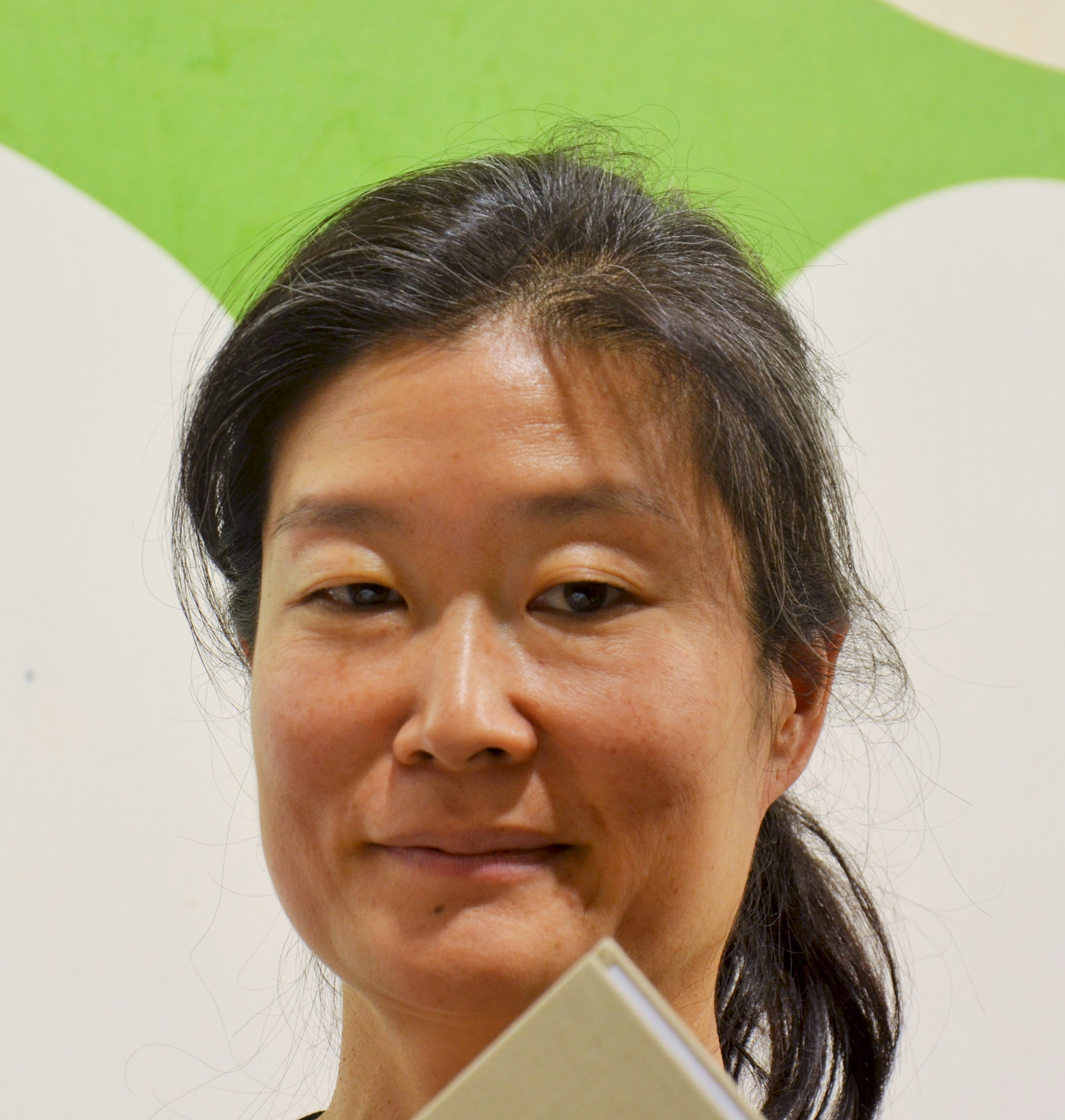
- Born: 1965 (age 60–61); Boston, USA
- Education: Bryn Mawr
- Alma mater: University of Oxford
- Occupation: Writer

Lani Yamamoto is a children's author and illustrator based in Iceland.

== Career ==
Yamamoto was born in Boston in 1965.

She studied psychology at Bryn Mawr College, has a diploma in filmmaking from the London Film School, and master's degrees in both creative writing and theology from the University of Oxford. She worked as a film editor in Boston before moving to Iceland.

In 2004 she published her first picture book for children, Albert. This was followed by three more books in the Albert series, and two more illustrated books for children, which have been translated into 14 languages. Her first novel for adults, Ours and Others', was shortlisted for the 2020 Novel Prize.

In 2017, she was a Benediktson Fellow at the Leighton Artists Colony at Banff Centre for Arts and Creativity.

Yamamoto has lived in Reykjavík for the past 25 years. She is married, with two children.

== Honours and awards ==
Yamamoto's books have been well received, and have won a number of literary prizes. Stína stórasæng won the Dimmalimm Prize for best illustrated book as well as Fjöruverðlaunin, the Women’s Literature Prize, and was nominated for the Nordic Council Children and Young People’s Literature Prize in 2014. Egill spámaður (Egill the Prophet), was nominated for the Nordic Council Children and Young People's Literature Prize, the Icelandic Literature Prize, and the Reykjavik Children's Book Award. Ours and Others' was shortlisted for the inaugural 2020 Fitzcarraldo Novel Prize.

== Books ==
- Albert 1-4: (2004-2006)
- Albert. Frances Lincoln. 2004. ISBN 978-1845071356.
- Albert 2. Sleeping Bear Press. 2005. ISBN 978-1585362653.
- Stina (originally Stína stórasæng). V&A Publishing. 2015. ISBN 978-1851778584.
- Egill spámaður: (Egill the Seer) (Angostura, 2019)
- Ours and Others': (Fitzcarraldo Editions, 2020)
