= Finn Øglænd =

Norwegian writer

- Born: 7 October 1957 (age 69); Stavanger, Norway
- Occupations: Author, poet, translator and literature critic

Finn Øglænd (born 7 October 1957 in Stavanger) is a Norwegian author, poet, translator and literature critic. He grew up on a small holding at Tananger in Sola Municipality.

Øglænd studied at the authors school in [[Bø, Telemark]]. He has worked at the Academy for the Written Arts in Hordaland. Since his initial publication of "Det opplyste landskapet" in 1983, he has produced an extensive collection of literary works covering various genres.

Øglænd was awarded a number of prizes for this work, including the Sunnmørsprisen 2000, for Dei penaste jentene på TV and the Skolebibliotekarforeningens litteraturpris in 2001, again in recognition for Dei penaste jentene på TV. He was also awarded the Samlagsprisen in 2005, and the Rasmus Løland-stipend in 2007 for his nonjudgmental depictions of youth as they are. He was also a finalist for the Brage Prize and the Norwegian Critics Prize for Literature in 1999 for his children's book Fem dagar, fire netter (Five Days, Four Nights).

== Bibliography ==
=== Poetry and prose ===
- Det opplyste landskapet – poetry (1983)
- Flammande mørke – poetry (1985)
- Mannen utan ansikt – novel (1985)
- Den niande himmelen – poetry (1986)
- Hengt manns himmel – poetry (1987)
- Opp i røyk. Pusteøvingar – poetry (1988)
- Pariserloff – novel (1988)
- Exit – poetry (1989)
- Auge i stein – poetry (1990)
- Underlege gjerningar – poetry (1991)
- Mannen med dei grøne fingrane – children’s book (1992)
- Mellomrom – poetry (1992)
- Ei fjør i hatten og andre dikt for barn – poetry for children (1993)
- Hjarteblod – novel (1993)
- Dyra i Halvferdigskogen – children’s book (1994) (illustrated by Akin Düzakin)
- Den nye poesi-handboka – poetry (1994)
- Dikt i utval – selected poems (1994)
- Ramle- and skramlevers – poetry for children (1995)
- Mortifikasjon – poetry (1997)
- Sjelefred – novel (1998)
- Fem dagar, fire netter – youth book (1998)
- Ubotelege rørsler – poetry (1999)
- Vers på tvers – poetry for children (1999) (illustrated by Øyvind Torseter and Saeko Matsushita)
- Passe hard, passe mjuk – youth book (1999)
- Dei penaste jentene på TV – youth book (2000)
- Hjartets protokollar – short poetry (2000)
- Poesi er for desperados – poetry (2001)
- Så lenge alltid varer – youth book (2001)
- Stina på månen – children’s book (2002) (illustrated by Kristin Roskifte)
- Dikt mot det nødvendige – poetry (2002)
- Rebell – youth book (2003)
- Amok – short stories for young people (2004)
- Opphav – poetry (2004)
- Det nye dyrealfabetet – poetry for children (2005)
- Eksil – poetry (2006)
- Svarte sjeler – youth book (2007)
- I den kalde molda brenn eit bål – poetry (2008)
- Lirum larum – poetry (2011)
- Posisjonar 2012 – poetry (2013)
- Ingentings barrikadar – poetry (2016)
- Høymolesong – poetry (2020)
- Leve evig som støvet – poetry (2023)
- Låglandssongar – poetry (2026)

=== Drama ===
- Berre ikkje noko skjer – play (1999)

=== Translations ===
- Livet er enkelt og greitt. Sju franske poetar i utval (1988) (works of seven French poets - together with Rolf Enger)
- Eugène Guillevic: Den nærsynte horisonten (1991) (together with Anne-Birgitte Rønning )
- Charles Simic: Dikt i utval (1995)
- Mark Strand: Svarte kart ( 996)
- James Wright: Greina brotnar ikkje (2003)
- Rutger Kopland: Ei verd utanfor meg sjølv (2005)
- Hugo Claus: Oostakker-dikta (2007) (together with Roald van Elswijk )
- Eddy van Vliet: Den framtidige tjuven (2008) (together with Tyra Teodora Tronstad )
