= Rolf Enger =

Norwegian writer

- Born: 10 November 1960 (age 65); Moss, Norway
- Occupations: Writer, teacher

Rolf Enger (born 10 November 1960) is a Norwegian writer who has lived in Bergen since 1991.

== Biography ==
He had an acclaimed debut in 1989, with the short story collection Ikke en urmaker i verden (World Without Watchmakers), and success with the novel "Eclipse" in 1994. His collections of short stories have been acclaimed by critics for their masterful craftmanship and deep and humorous portraits of boys and men. He has also worked as a journalist and is currently (2017) working as a teacher in creative writing at the Skrivekunst Academy in Hordaland. Thru many years, he has also written many reviews on books for Bergens Tidende, and has also been an editor for the magazine Kraftverk; and also with Skrivekunst, Eide publisher 1995, alongside Finn Øglænd.

== Bibliography ==
- Sju franske poeter: Livet er enkelt og greit (7 French poets: Life is nice and easy) (1988)
- Ikke en urmaker i verden (World Without Watchmakers) (1989)
- Bronsegutter (The Bronze Boys) (1991)
- Solformørkelse (Eclipse) (1994)
- Mekhane, an essay on billiards (1995)
- Hvis noen skulle være så vemmelige (If someone were to be so nasty) (1997)
- Tid og ro (Time and Piece) (2001)
- 1949:e.Kr. (2005)
- Bronsegutter (short stories, best of) (The Bronze Boys) (2006)

== Nominations ==
- Hilmar Orud prisen (1989)
- Nominert til Amanda-pris for kortfilmen Blå Java (screenplay together with Morten Evelid) (2000)
