= Håkon Øvreås =

Norwegian writer

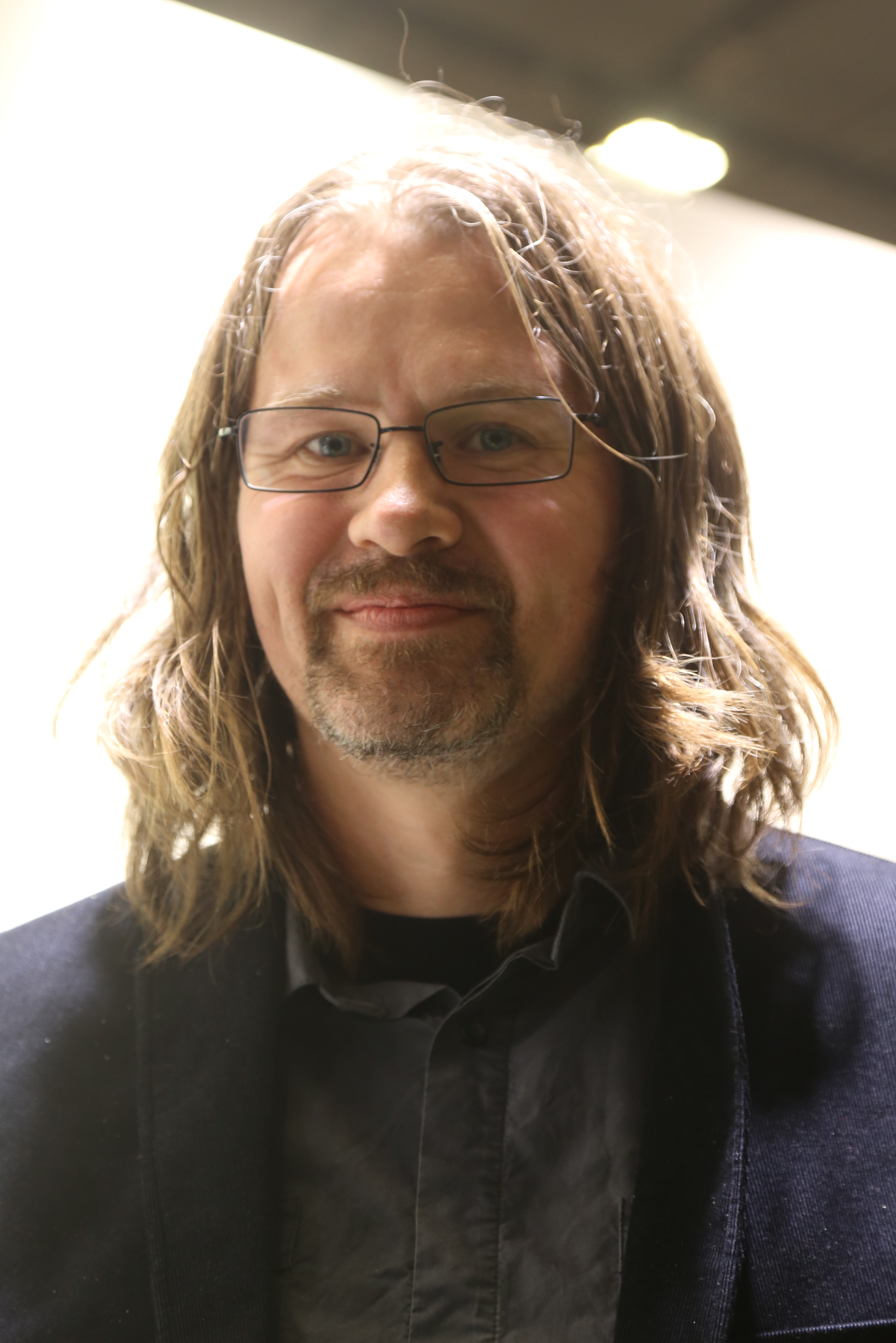
Håkon Øvreås

Håkon Øvreås (born 1974) is a Norwegian poet and writer.

He is best known for his debut work of children's literature, Brune (Brown, 2013), the first of a planned trilogy. The book was successful commercially and won numerous awards, among them:

- the Norwegian Ministry of Culture's Literature Prize (Best Children's and Young Adults Book) in 2013
- the Trollkrittet Prize (Norwegian children's/YA book writers' debut prize) in 2013
- the Nordic Council Literature Prize for Children and Young Adults in 2014
- the Dutch Zilveren Griffel (Silver Pencil) in 2015,
- the German Luchs des Jahres (Best Children and YA Book) in 2016
- the 2020 Batchelder Award given by the American Library Association (given to Kari Dickson's English translation).

Brune was also nominated for the Brage Prize 2013. The translation rights for the trilogy have been sold to 30 languages.

Awards
Preceded by Arne Svingen	Recipient of the Ministry of Culture Prize for Children's and Youth Literature; 2013	Succeeded by Liv Marit Weberg
