= West Nordic Council's Children and Youth Literature Prize =

Award given to literary works by West Nordic Council

The West Nordic Council's Children and Youth Literature Prize is a literary award established in 2002 by the West Nordic Council. The prize is awarded every second year at the annual meeting of the West Nordic Council, normally in August. The three countries of the North West region of Northern Europe are Greenland, Iceland and the Faroe Islands (Greenland and Faroe Islands are autonomous constituent countries of the Kingdom of Denmark). These countries nominate one literary work each. The winner gets a reward of DKK 60 000 and their book is translated into the other two languages of the region and into one of the Scandinavian languages: Norwegian, Danish, Swedish or Finnish, without any expenses for the winner.

== Winners ==
- 2020 - Langelstur að eilífu by Bergrún Íris Sævarsdóttir
- 2018 - Træið by Bárður Oskarsson
- 2016 - Hon, sum róði eftir ælaboganum, by Rakel Helmsdal
- 2014 - Tidsskisten by Andri Snær Magnason
- 2012 - Kaassalimik oqaluttuaq (The Story of Kaassali), by Lars-Pele Berthelsen
- 2010 - Garðurinn (Kirkegården), by Gerður Kristný
- 2008 - Draugaslóð (Ghost Track / Danish title: Spøgelsesspor), by Kristín Helga Gunnarsdóttir
- 2006 - Ein hundur, ein ketta og ein mús (A Dog, A Cat and a Mouse / Danish title: En hund, en kat og en mus), by Bárður Oskarsson
- 2004 - Engill í vesturbænum (An Angel in the Neighbourhood / En engel i nabolaget), af Kristín Steinsdóttir by Halla Sólveig Þorgeirsdóttir
- 2002 - Sagan af bláa hnettinum (Historien om den blå planet), by Andri Snær Magnason

== Nominees ==
=== 2020 ===
==== From Iceland ====
- Langelstur að eilífu by Bergrún Íris Sævarsdóttir

==== From Greenland ====
- Orpilissat nunarsuarmi kusanarnersaat by Juaaka Lyberth

==== From the Faroe Islands ====
- Loftar tú mær? by Rakel Helmsdal

=== 2018 ===
==== From Iceland ====
- Úlfur og Edda by Kristín Ragna Gunnarsdóttir

==== From Greenland ====
- Kammagiitta! Vil du være min ven? by Maja-Lisa Kehlet

==== From the Faroe Islands ====
- Træið by Bárður Oskarsson

=== 2016 ===
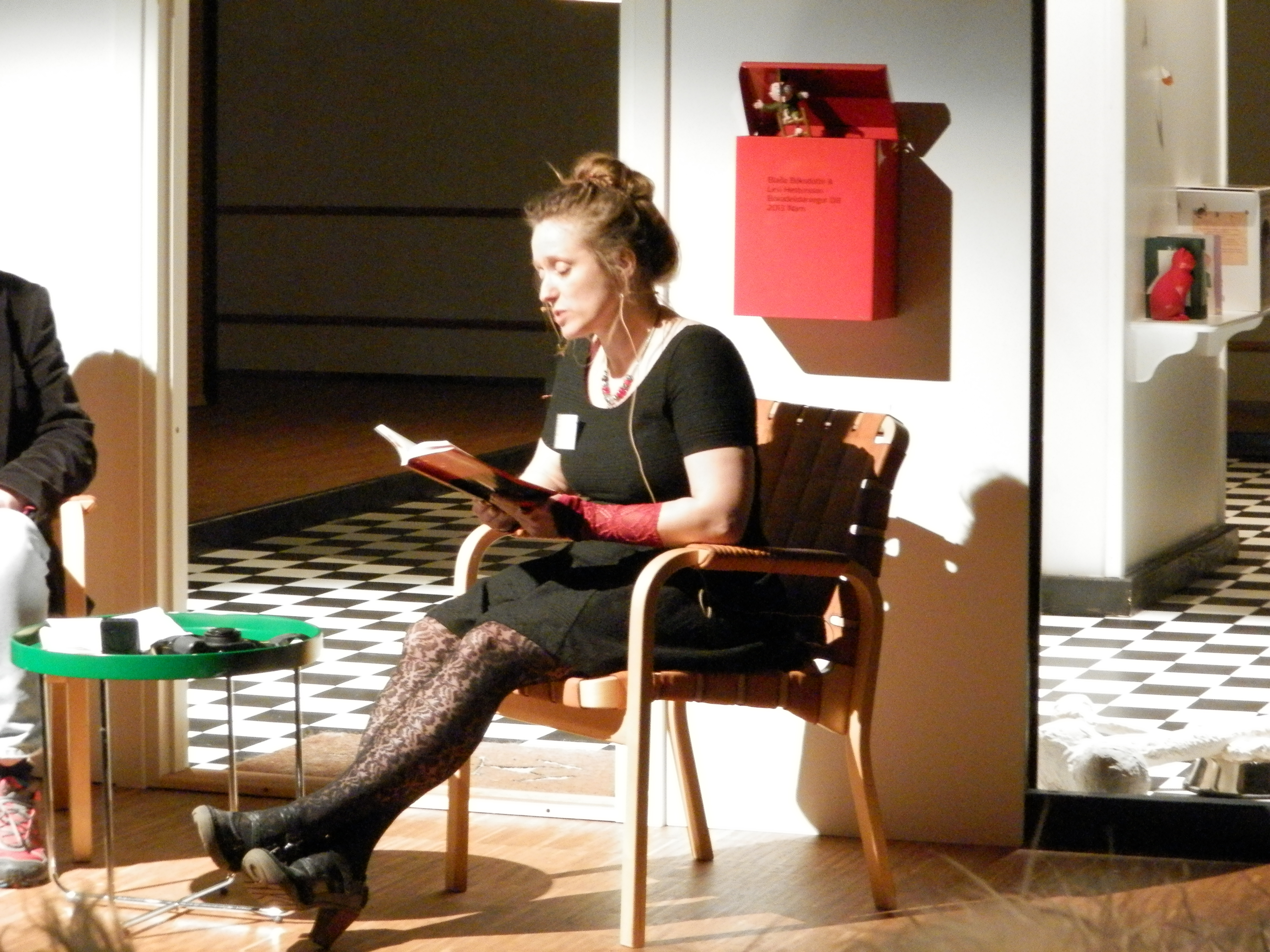
Rakel Helmsdal is nominated from the Faroe Islands in 2016.

==== From Iceland ====
- Mamma Klikk, by Gunnar Helgason

==== From Greenland ====
- AVUU, by Frederik “Kunngi” Kristensen

==== From the Faroe Islands ====
- Hon, sum róði eftir ælaboganum, by Rakel Helmsdal

=== 2014 ===
==== From Iceland ====
- Tímakistan, by Andri Snær Magnason

==== From Greenland ====
- Den magiske kasket, by Kathrine Rosing

==== From the Faroe Islands ====
- Flata Kaninin, by Bárður Oskarsson

=== 2012 ===
==== From Iceland ====
- Með heiminn í vasanum (With the World in the Pocket / Danish title: Med hele verden i lommen), by Margrét Örnólfsdóttir

==== From Greenland ====
- Kaassalimik oqaluttuaq (The Story of Kaassali / Danish title: Fortælling om Kaassali), by Lars-Pele Berthelsen

==== From the Faroe Islands ====
- Skriva í sandin (Write in the Sand / Danish title: Skriv i sandet), by Marjun Syderbø Kjelnæs

=== 2010 ===
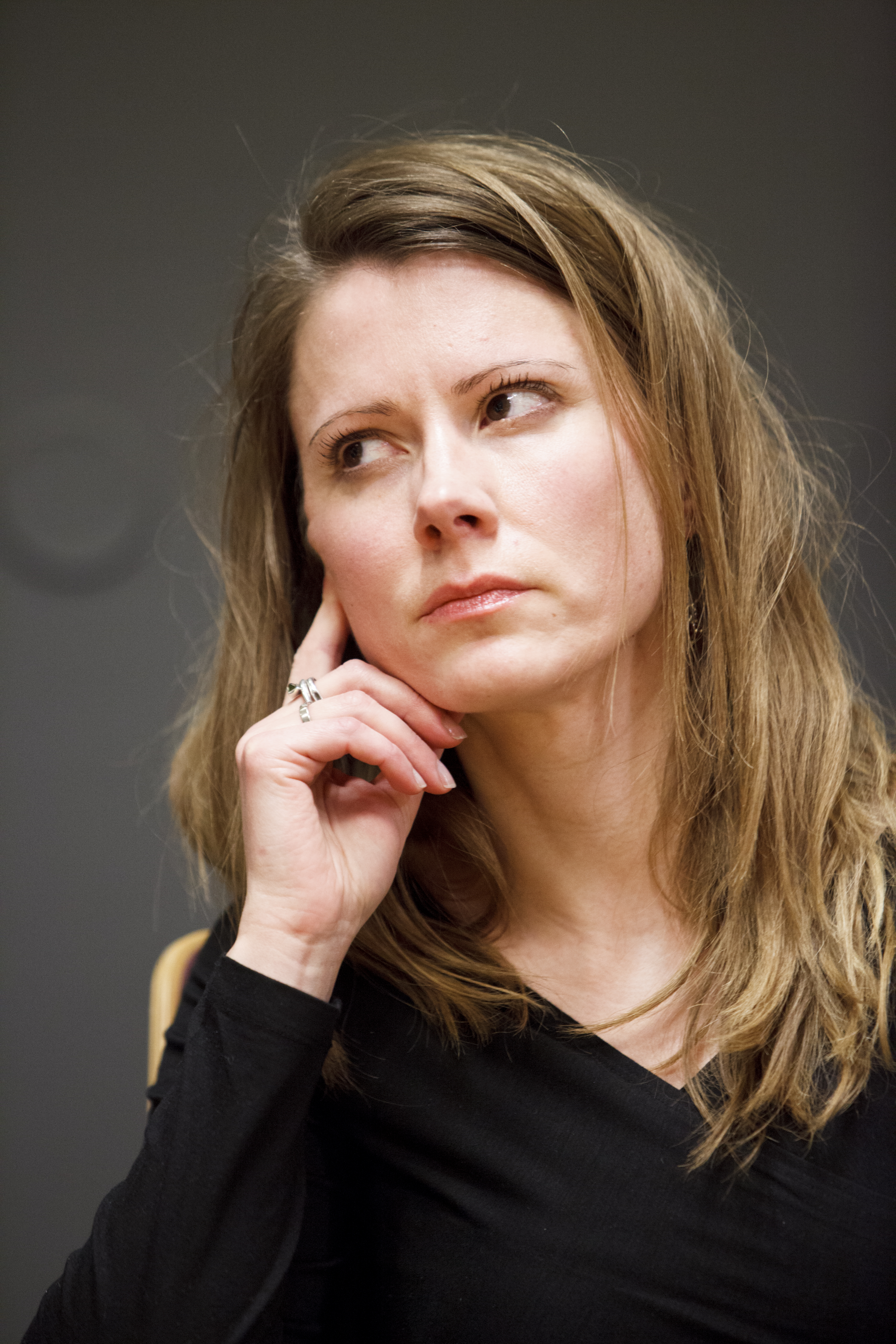
Gerður Kristný won the prize in 2010.

==== From Iceland ====
- Garðurinn (The Grave Yard / Danish title: Kirkegården), by Gerður Kristný

==== From Greenland ====
- Sila, by Lana Hansen

==== From the Faroe Islands ====
- Várferðin til brúnna, by Rakel Helmsdal

=== 2008 ===
==== From Iceland ====
- Draugaslóð (Danish title: Spøgelsesspor), by Kristín Helga Gunnarsdóttir

==== From Greenland ====
- Abct, by Julie Edel Hardenber

==== From the Faroe Islands ====
- Apollonia, by Edward Fuglø

=== 2006 ===
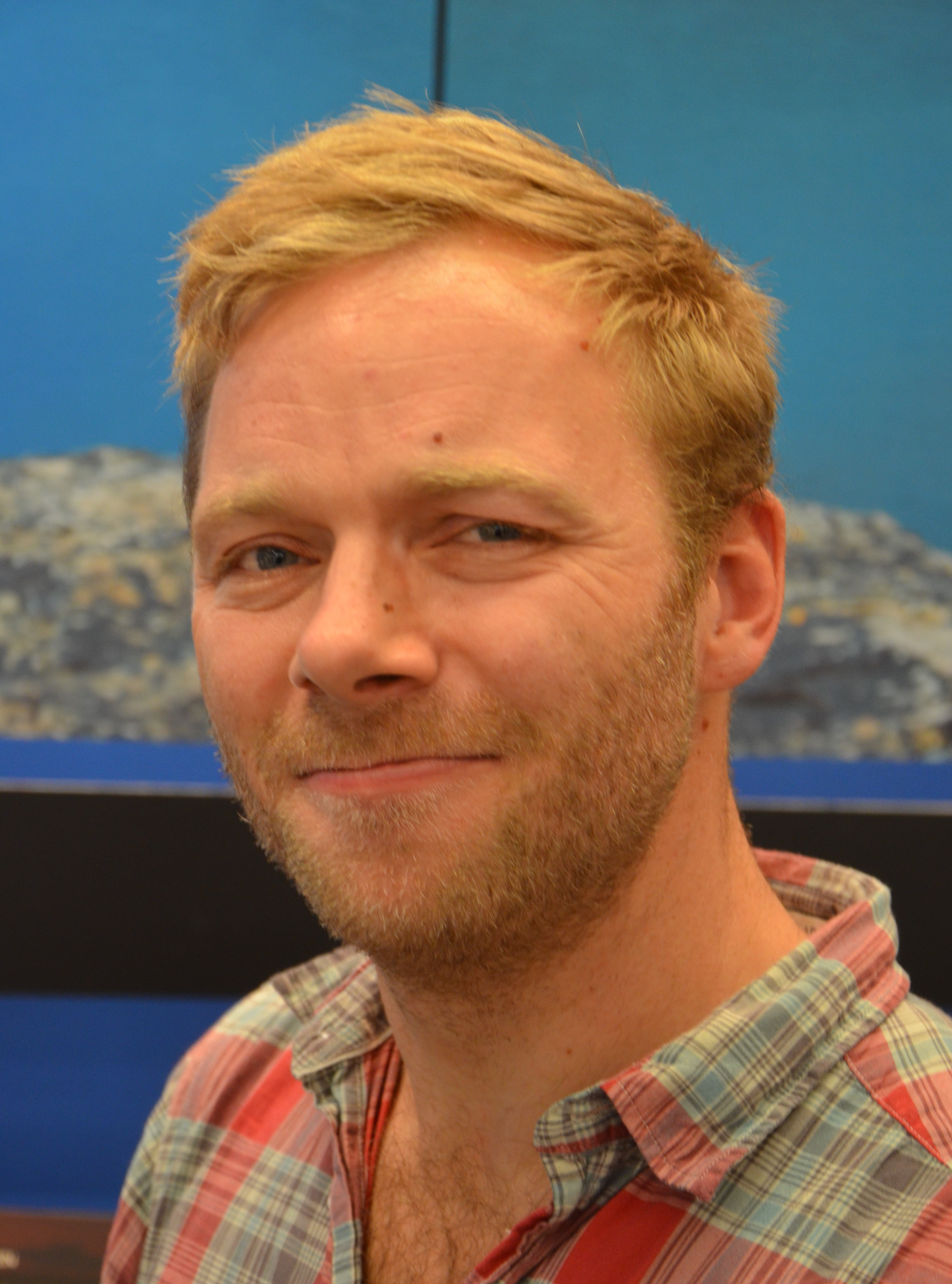
Bárður Oskarsson from the Faroe Islands won the prize in 2006.

==== From Iceland ====
- Frosnu tærnar (Frozen Toes / De frosne tæer), by Sigrún Eldjárn

==== From Greenland ====
- Nissimaat nissimaajaqqallu (Santa Claus / Danish title: Nissemænd og små nisser), by Grethe Guldager illustrated by Nuka Godfredsen

==== From the Faroe Islands ====
- Ein hundur, ein ketta og ein mús (A dog, a cat and a Mouse / Danish title: En hund, en kat og en mus), by Bárður Oskarsson

=== 2004 ===
==== From Greenland ====
- Inuk sodavandillu akuukkat (Inuk - The poisoned soft drink / Danish title: Inuk - og forgiftede sodavand), by Jokum Nielsen

==== From Iceland ====
- Engill í vesturbænum, by Kristín Steinsdóttir illustrated by Halla Sólveig Þorgeirsdóttir

==== From the Faroe Islands ====
- Loppugras (poems) by Sólrún Michelsen illustrated by Hanni Bjartalíð. Includes a musical-CD, with songs sung by a school class, songs from the book.

=== 2002 ===
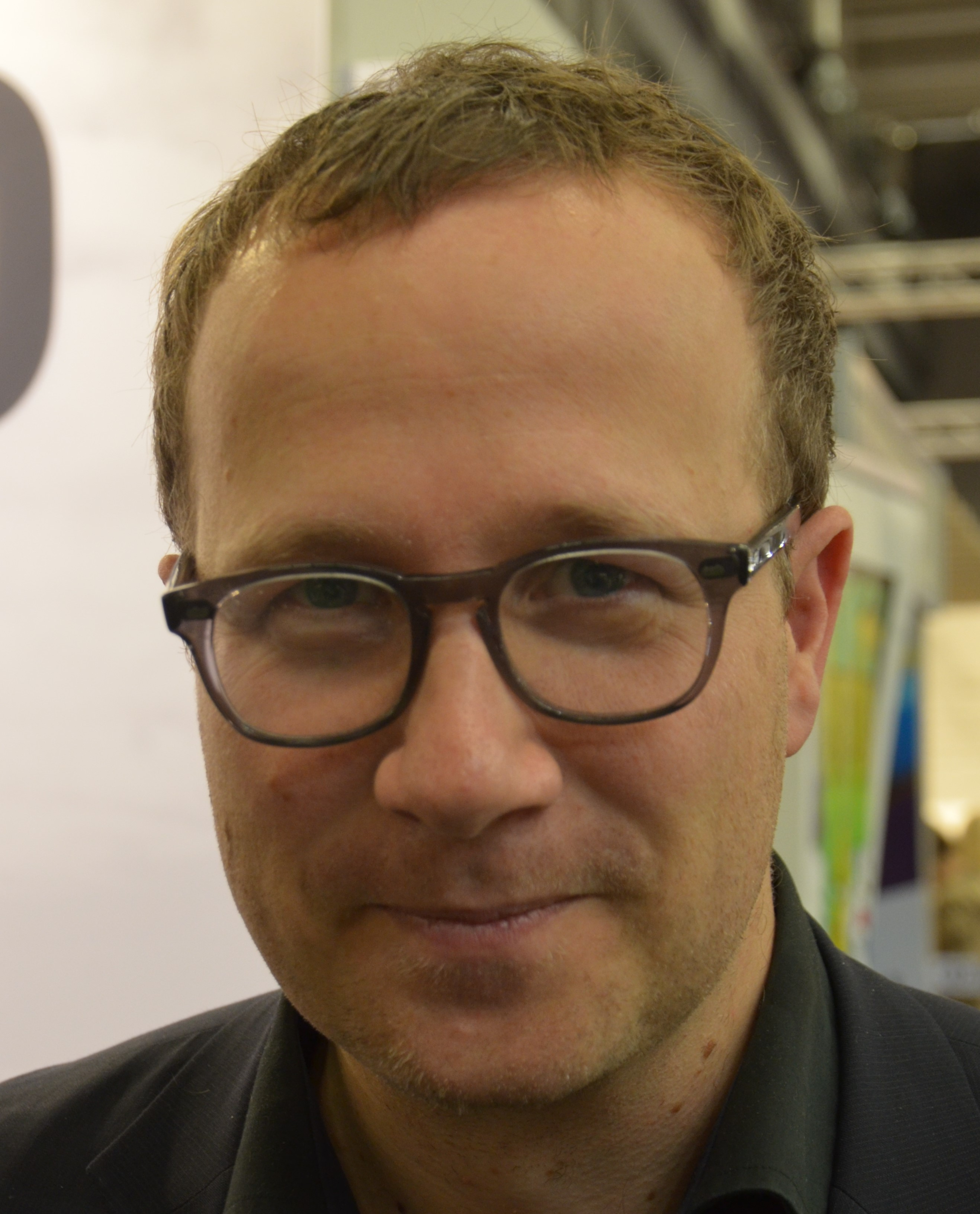
Andri Snær Magnason won the prize in 2002.

==== From Greenland ====
- Sialuarannguaq, by Jørgen Petersen

==== From Iceland ====
- Sagan af bláa hnettinum, by Andri Snær Magnason

==== From the Faroe Islands ====
- Kuffa by Brynhild Andreasen (text) and Astrid MacDonald (drawings)
