= Maria Turtschaninoff =

Finnish author

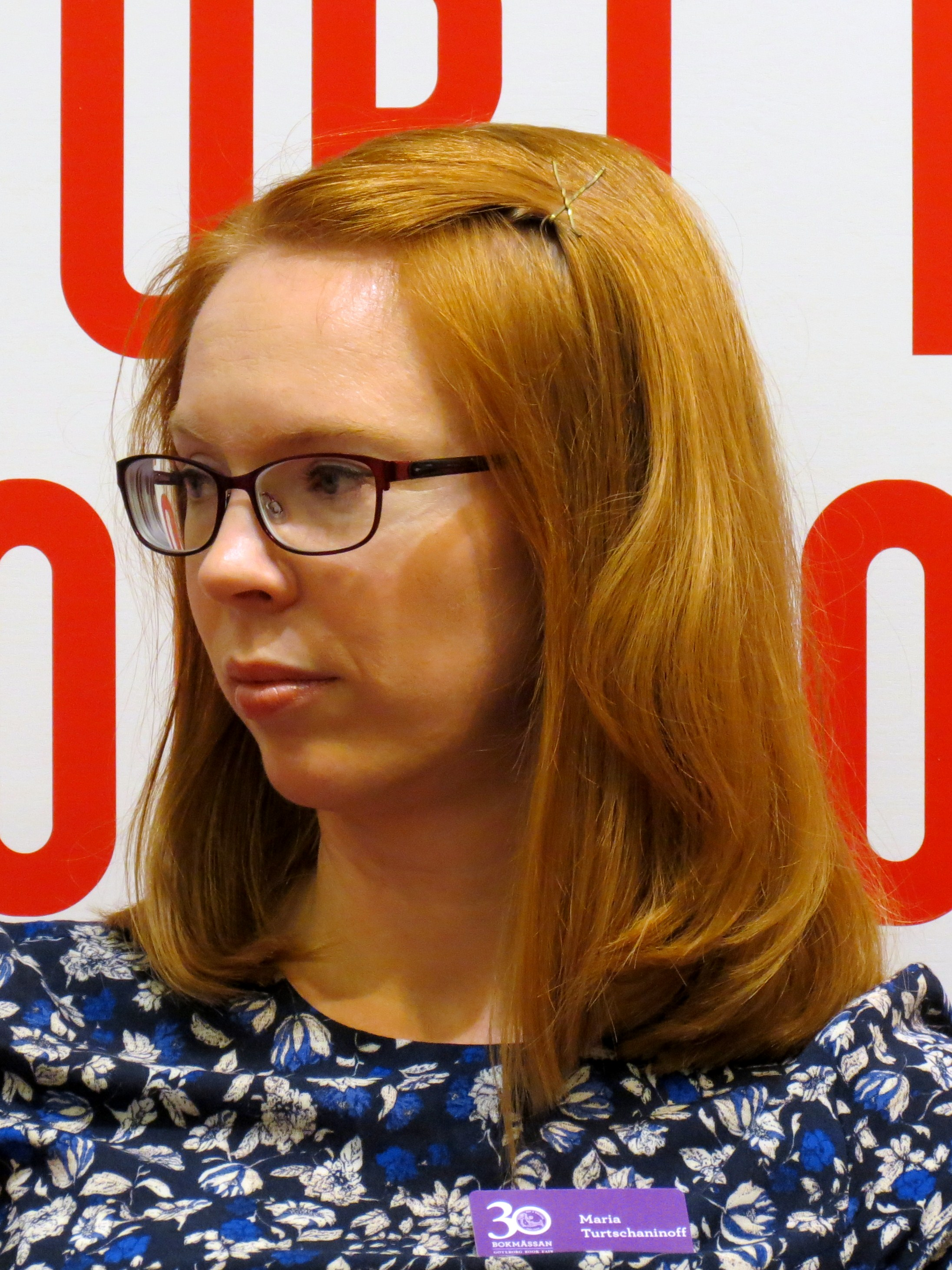
- Born: February 21, 1977 (age 49); Helsinki, Finland
- Education: Master of Philosophy
- Alma mater: University of Gothenburg
- Occupation: Author
- Writing career
- Language: Swedish
- Years active: 2014–
- Genre: Fantasy
- Notable work: Red Abbey Chronicles
- Website: Author's website

Maria Turtschaninoff (born 1977) is a Finnish author. She is best known for writing fantasy books including Maresi, the first book in the Red Abbey Chronicles and winner of the 2014 Finlandia Junior Prize.

== Life and career ==
Turtschaninoff was born in 1977 in Finland and her first language is Finland’s Swedish. As a child, she appeared in a minor role in the television series Harjunpää och antastaren (1985). She received the degree of Master of Philosophy from University of Gothenburg in 2000 where she studied human ecology. After her graduation, she worked as a journalist in Helsinki.

The first book of her Red Abbey Chronicles, Maresi, was published in Finland in 2014 and won the 2014 Finlandia Junior Prize. The film rights to Maresi were bought by Film4 in 2016. The second book of the series, Naondel, was published in 2016.

She was awarded with the Swedish YLE Literature Prize in 2014 and the Finland-Swedish cultural prize in 2017. Turtschaninoff was also nominated for the 2015 Nordic Council Children and Young People's Literature Prize and the 2018 Astrid Lindgren Memorial Award.
