= Eva Lindström =

Swedish illustrator and writer (born 1952)

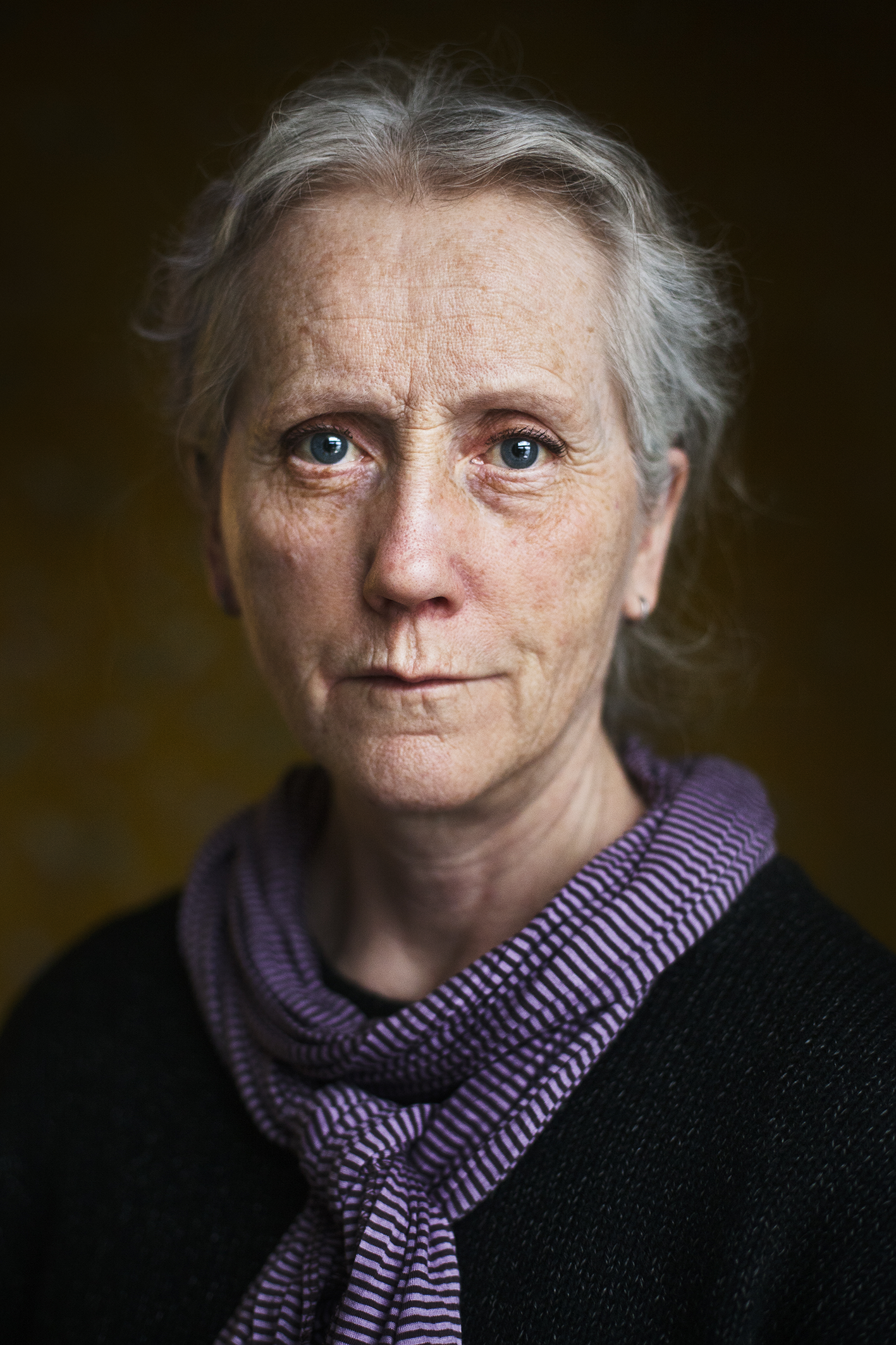
Eva Lindström (2014)

Eva Lindström (born 1952) is a Swedish illustrator and author. Her work is known for its humorous and dark style.

== Life ==
Lindström was born in Västerås in 1952. She attended the art school Konstfack in Stockholm from 1969 to 1974, where she studied painting and was part of a radical political activist group. The origin of her more radical and dark art style is attributed to this time period. She began her career in the 1980s as a cartoonist. Her first book was Kattmössan (The Cat Hat), which she wrote and illustrated. In 1996, she published her second book Lurix. She is known for her children's books, such as Berättesler om Mats Och Roj (Somebody Moves In—Stories About Mats and Roj) (2002) and Olli Och Mo (Olli and Mo) (2012).

== Style ==
Lindström's illustrations are often created using watercolor with gouache or pencil. The Nordic Council Children and Young People's Literature Prize nomination text described her work as "often funny and clever as well as having an existential depth."

== Selected works ==
- The Cat Hat (1989)
- Olli och Mo (Olli and Mo)
- Snöret, fågeln och jag (Little String, the Bird, and Me) (2013)
- My Dog Mouse (2017), Gecko Press ISBN 9781776571499
- Everyone Walks Away (2019), Gecko Press ISBN 9781776571871

== Awards and honors ==
- Elsa Beskow Plaque, 1993
- BMF Plaque, 2001
- Expressens Heffaklump, 2002
- En Bok För Alla's Literary Humor Prize, 2003
- Snöbollen's Best Picture Book of the Year, 2012
- August Prize, 2013 for Snöret, fågeln och jag with Ellen Karlsson
- Shortlist for the Hans Christian Andersen Award, 2014
- Astrid Lindgren Memorial Award, 2022
