= Rakel Helmsdal =

Faroese author and artist (born 1966)

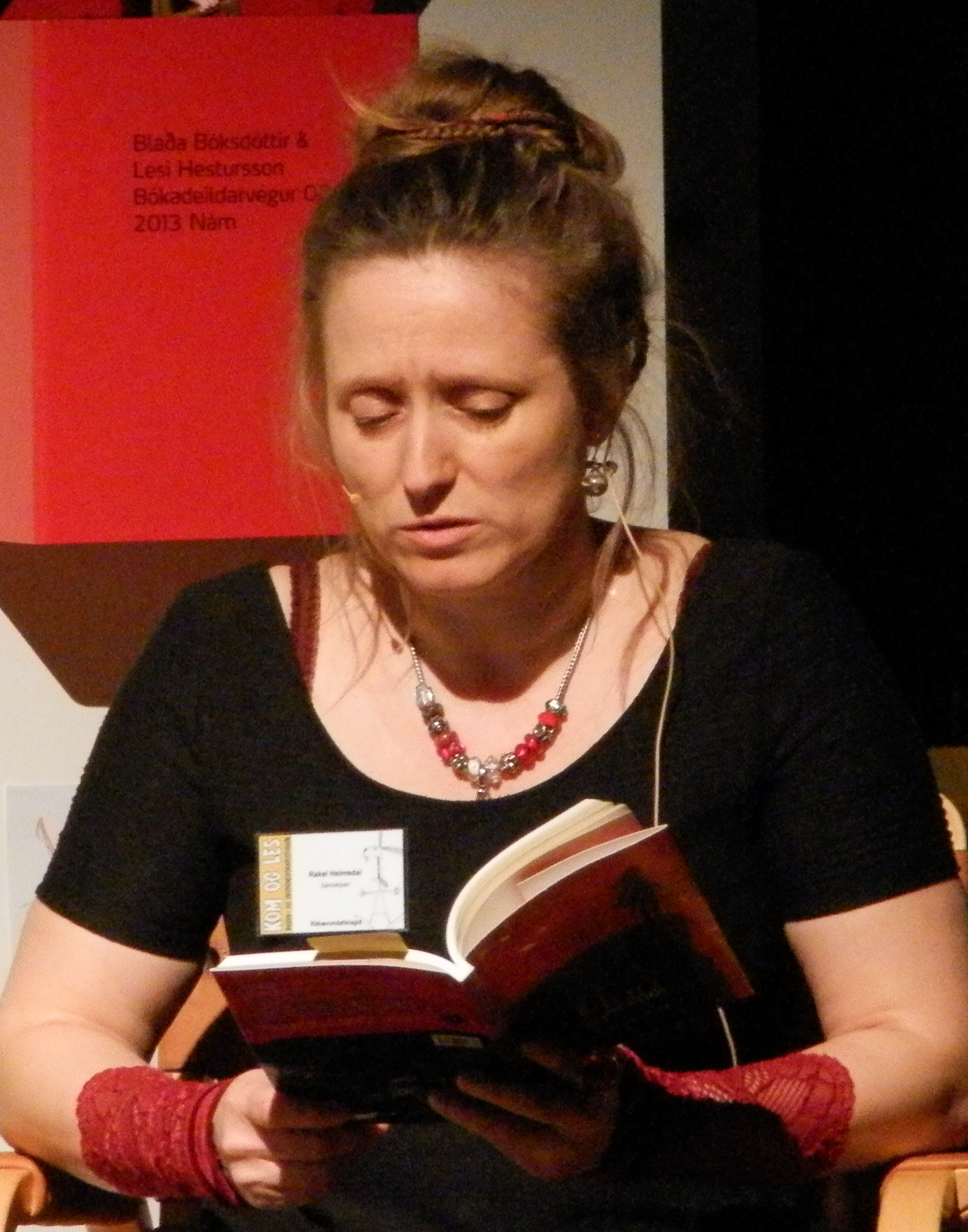
- Rakel Helmsdal in 2022.
- Born: 25 September 1966 (age 60); Tårnby, Amager, Denmark
- Occupations: Author, artist
- Writing career
- Language: Faroese, English
- Period: 1995 –
- Genres: novels, short stories, plays, poems
- Website: www.rakelhelmsdal.info

Rakel Helmsdal (born 25 September 1966) is a Faroese author and artist. She writes novels, short stories, plays, poems for all age groups, as well as being a visual artist who illustrates some her books. She is the current chair person for the Association of Writers of the Faroe Islands (Faroese: Rithøvundafelag Føroya).

Many of her books have been translated into other languages, and have won a number of literary awards. She has received multiple grants from the Faroese government through the Mentanargrunnur Landsins, and in 2024 she received a three-year working grant.

Her work includes collaboration with two other authors, Áslaug Jónsdóttir from Iceland and Kalle Güettler from Sweden on a series of 10 "Monsters" books starting with Nei! segði litla skrímsl (No! Said Little Monster) in 2004. They are published simultaneously in the Faroe Islands, Iceland and Sweden and have been translated into many other languages.

== Biography ==
Rakel Helmsdal was born in Tårnby near Copenhagen in 1966 by a Faroese mother and a Danish father. Her mother, Guðrið Helmsdal, an author as well, was the first Faroese woman who published a poetry collection in the Faroese language and was also the first Faroese author of either gender who published a modernistic poetry collection. Her parents moved to Leynar in the Faroe Islands in the 1970s, where her father, Ole Jacob Nielsen, has been working as a sculptural woodturner, working with Faroese wood. Helmsdal lived in France in the late 1980s and early 1990s, and during this period she wrote her first novels. Her first novel was "Tey kalla meg bara Hugo" (The just call me Hugo), and the following year she published her first short story collection titled Søgur úr Port Janua (Stories from Port Janua). She has published books for people of all ages: children, youth and adults. Some of her books are illustrated by herself, and others by other artists such as the Faroese artist Edward Fuglø, who illustrated her book series Úr Mosakulluni and her short story collection with fairy tales about dragons etc. "Drekar og annað valafólk".

Helmsdal has written a screenplay to a short film, co-writing the screenplay to the short film Brother Troll (Faroese: Trøllabeiggi), which was directed by her brother Gudmund Helmsdal. The screenplay was written by Gudmund Helmsdal, Rakel Helmsdal and Torfinnur Jákupsson. The film won the Faroese audience film award named Geytin and later it won several awards from various film festivals around the world, such as at the Darbhanga International Film Festival in India, where Brother Troll won a total of five awards, including Best Script.

== Bibliography ==
=== Novels ===
- 1995 – Tey kalla meg bara Hugo (2nd edition 2011)
- 1997 – Hvørjum flenna likkurnar at, Hugo?
- 2003 – Kom yvirum, Hugo!
- 2007 – Gott hugflog Hugo
- 2008 – Várferðin til Brúnna, illustrated by Edward Fuglø
- 2009 – Veturin hjá Undu, illustrated by Edward Fuglø
- 2014 – Hon, sum róði eftir ælaboganum
- 2020 – Kjar', illustrated by Katrina Skarðsá
- 2023 – Dreymsótt
- 2023 – Toran gongur
- 2024 – Leyp nú, Eva! illustrated by Katrina Skarðsá

=== Short Stories – Collections ===
- 1996 – Søgur úr Port Janua
- 1998 – Drekar og annað valafólk, with illustrations by Edward Fuglø
- 2018 – Miljuløtur, with illustrations by Kathrina Skarðsá

=== Illustrated Books ===
- 2004 – Nei! segði lítla skrímsl (with Áslaug Jónsdóttir and Kalle Güettler)
- 2006 – Stór skrímsl gráta ikki (with Áslaug Jónsdóttir and Kalle Güettler)
- 2007 – Myrkaskrímsl (with Áslaug Jónsdóttir and Kalle Güettler)
- 2008 – Skrímslasótt (with Áslaug Jónsdóttir and Kalle Güettler)
- 2010 – Skrímslavitjan (with Áslaug Jónsdóttir and Kalle Güettler)
- 2011 – Skrímslahæddir (with Áslaug Jónsdóttir and Kalle Güettler)
- 2011 – Veiða vind (musical work, book and CD. author: Rakel Helmsdal, composer: Kári Bæk, illustrator: Janus á Húsagarði. Has been performed by the Faroe Islands Symphony Orchestra, the Iceland Symphony Orchestra and the London Symphony Orchestra)
- 2011 – Revurin við silkiturriklæðinum
- 2013 – Klandursskrímsl (with Áslaug Jónsdóttir and Kalle Güettler)
- 2014 – Skrímslakiskan (with Áslaug Jónsdóttir and Kalle Güettler)
- 2017 – Neyðars skrímsl (with Áslaug Jónsdóttir and Kalle Güettler)
- 2019 – Loftar tú mær?, illustrations by Rakel Helmsdal
- 2021 – Reiggjan, illustrations by Rakel Helmsdal
- 2022 – Skrímslaleikur (with Áslaug Jónsdóttir and Kalle Güettler)

=== Translations ===
Several of Rakel Helmsdals books have been translated into other languages.

- 2022 – Dziewczyna, która wiosłowała w stronę tęczy, Dziwny Potmysl, Poland
- 2019 – Monsterklammeri, Torgard, Denmark
- 2019 – Hun som roede mod regnbuen, Torgard, Denmark
- 2018 – Hun som rodde mot regnbuen, Orkana, Norway
- 2014 – Skrímslakiskan (in Faroese, Icelandic, Swedish, Chinese, Arabic)
- 2013 – Veiða vind – tónlistarævintýri. Translated into Icelandic by Thórarinn Eldjárn (Forlagið)
- 2012 – Klandursskrímsl (in Faroese, Icelandic, Swedish, Danish, Norwegian (nynorsk), French, Chinese)
- 2010 – Skrímslahæddir (in Faroese, Icelandic, Swedish, Chinese, Arabic)
- 2009 – Dei kallar meg berre Hugo. Translated into Norwegian by Lars Moa (Kapabel)
- 2009 – Skrímslavitjan (in Faroese, Icelandic, Swedish, Danish, French, Chinese, Arabic)
- 2008 – Skrímslasótt (in Faroese, Icelandic, Swedish, Danish, Norwegian (nynorsk), French, Chinese, Arabic)
- 2007 – Myrkaskrímsl (in Faroese, Icelandic, Swedish, Danish, Norwegian (nynorsk), French, Chinese, Arabic)
- 2006 – Stór skrímsl gráta ikki (in Faroese, Icelandic, Swedish, Danish, Norwegian (bokmål & nynorsk), French, Chinese, Spanish, Catalan, Galician, Basque, Lithuanian, Arabic, Czech, Latvian, Japanese)
- 2004 – Nei! segði lítla skrímsl (in Faroese, Icelandic, Swedish, Danish, Finnish, Norwegian (bokmål & nynorsk), French, Chinese, Spanish, Catalan, Galician, Basque, Lithuanian, Arabic, Czech)

== Recognition ==
- 1996 – Barnabókaheiðursløn Tórshavnar Býráðs (Faroese award) for her children's book Tey kalla meg bara Hugo.
- 2004 – Dimmalim (Icelandic award) for Nei! segði lítla skrímsl, which was written together with Áslaug Jónsdóttir and Kalle Güettler
- 2007 – Barnabókaverðlaun Menntaráðs Reykjavíkur (Icelandic award) for Stór skrímsl gráta ikki, which was written together with Áslaug Jónsdóttir and Kalle Güettler
- 2008 – Won an award in a short story competition, stories for Faroese youth
- 2009 – Várferðin til Brúnna – nominated for the West Nordic Council's Children and Youth Literature Prize.
- 2011 – Skrímslahæddir nominated for the Fjörðuverðlaun (Icelandic award).
- 2013 – Nominated to the ALMA Award 2013 – Astrid Lindgren Memorial Award
- 2013 – Veiða vind nominated for the Nordic Children's Book Prize (called Nordisk Skolebibliotekarforenings Børnebogspris or Nordisk Børnebogspris in Danish and Norwegian).
- 2013 – Children's Cultural Prize of Tórshavn City Council (Faroese cultural award for children's literature and other cultural achievements), she won the award for Veiða vind and for the books about the Skrímsl (Monsters) and the plays made of these books
- 2013 – Nominated by Iceland for the Nordic Council Children and Young People's Literature Prize together with Áslaug Jónsdóttir and Kalle Güettler for the book Klandursskrímsl/Skrímslaerjur/Monsterbråk
- 2014 – Nominated to the ALMA Award 2014 – Astrid Lindgren Memorial Award
- 2016 – Nominated for the West Nordic Council's Children and Youth Literature Prize for Hon, sum róði eftir ælaboganum.
- 2016 – Received the West Nordic Council's Children and Youth Literature Prize for Hon, sum róði eftir ælaboganum.
- 2017 – Nominated for the Nordic Council Children and Young People's Literature Prize for Hon, sum róði eftir ælaboganum
- 2018 – Nominated by Iceland for the Nordic Council Children and Young People's Literature Prize together with Áslaug Jónsdóttir and Kalle Güettler for the book Skrímsli í vanda/Neyðars skrímsl/Monster i knipa
- 2019 – Nominated to the ALMA Award 2019 – Astrid Lindgren Memorial Award
- 2019 – Nominated for the Nordic Council Children and Young People's Literature Prize for Miljuløtur
- 2020 – Nominated to the ALMA Award 2020 – Astrid Lindgren Memorial Award
- 2020 – Children's Cultural Prize of Tórshavn City Council for Loftar tú mær?
- 2020 – Nominated for the Nordic Council Children and Young People's Literature Prize for Loftar tú mær?
- 2020 – Nominated for the West Nordic Council's Children and Youth Literature Prize for Loftar tú mær?
- 2024 – Nominated for the Nordic Council Children and Young People's Literature Prize for Toran gongur
