= Linda Bondestam =

Finnish illustrator and children's writer (born 1977)

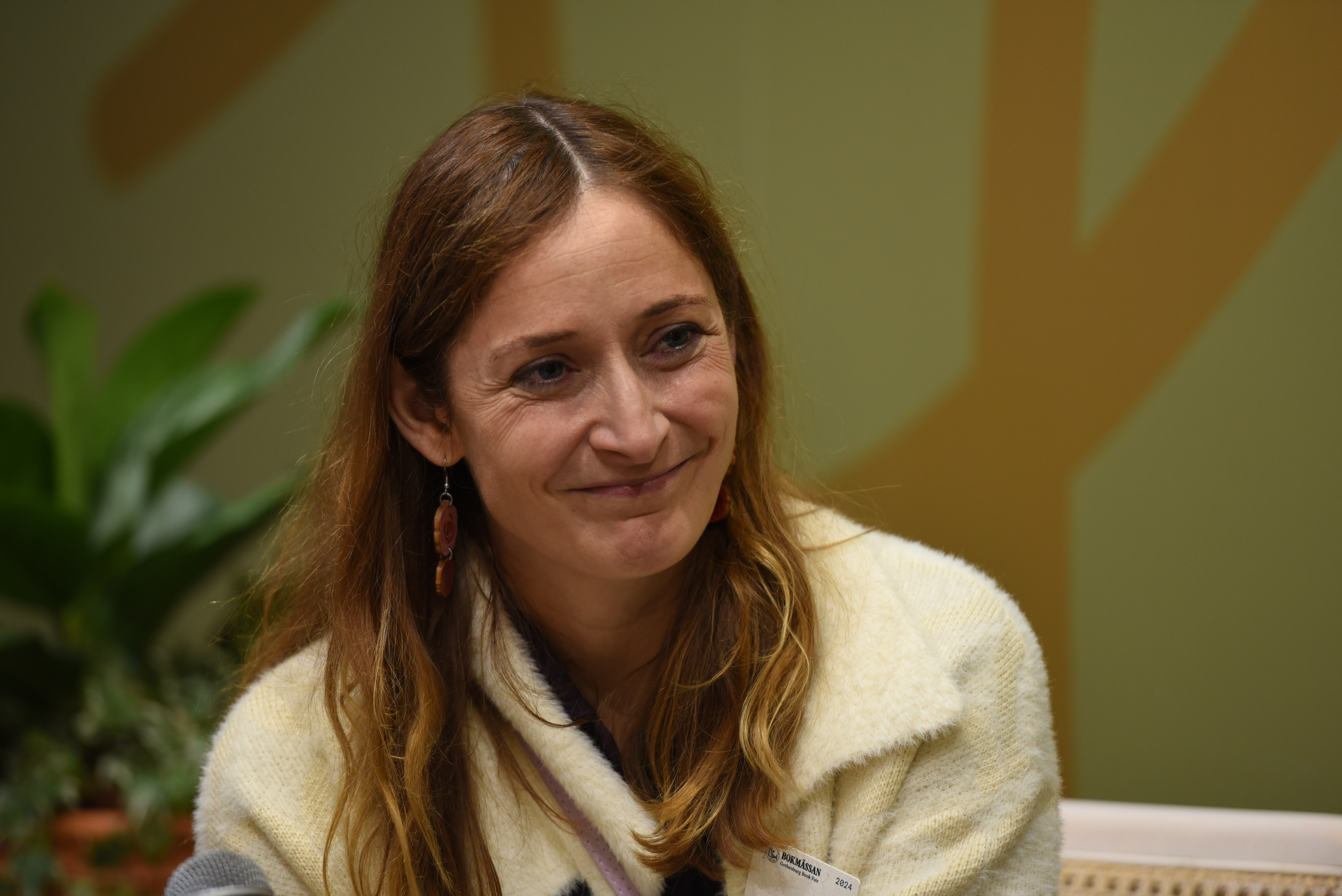
Bondestam in 2024

Linda Bondestam (born 1977) is a Finnish illustrator and writer of children's books.

== Early life and education ==
Bondestam was born in 1977, and studied illustration at Kingston University, England.

== Illustration and writing ==
Bondestom's first published work was the illustration of Linnéa och Änglarna (Linnea and the Angels) by Mikaela Sundström in 2003. Since then she has illustrated over 40 books written in Swedish or Finnish, which have been translated into many languages including Arabic, English and Ukrainian. Since 2018 she has also written and illustrated works alone.

== Awards and selected nominations ==
In 2017, she won the Nordic Council Children and Young People's Literature Prize for her illustration of the book Djur som ingen sett utom vi (Animals Nobody Has Seen Except Us), written by Ulf Stark . The judges commented that: "Linda Bondestam's illustrations, with their deep red skies and intense blue-green forests, sea and mountains, bear witness to an artist who goes from strength to strength with each book."

Her book Chop Chop won the 2024 August Prize for writing for children and young adults; it was also nominated for the 2025 Nordic Council Children and Young Peoples Literature Prize. This was the fourth book she had both written and illustrated.

In 2026 she was nominated for the Hans Christian Andersen Award for illlustrators, which "recognize[s] lifelong achievement" of "an illustrator whose complete works have made an important, lasting contribution to children's literature".

She has been nominated for the Astrid Lindgren Memorial Award in 2010, 2020, 2021, 2022, 2023, 2024, 2025 and 2026.
