= Liv Marit Weberg =

Norwegian children's writer (born 1988)

Liv Marit Weberg (born 4 May 1988) is a Norwegian children's writer.

She grew up in Drammen. She made her literary debut in 2014 with the young adult fiction book Jeg blir heldigvis ikke lagt merke til, and followed with Påstander om meg i tilfeldig rekkefølge, both published by Aschehoug.

For Jeg blir heldigvis ikke lagt merke til, Weberg was awarded the Ministry of Culture Award for Children's and Youth Literature.

Awards
Preceded by Håkon Øvreås	Recipient of the Ministry of Culture Prize for Children's and Youth Literature; 2014	Succeeded by Inga Sætre
