= Kristín Ragna Gunnarsdóttir =

Icelandic writer and illustrator

Kristín Ragna Gunnarsdóttir (born 2 May 1968) is an Icelandic writer and illustrator of children's books. A literary scholar, she has lectured on creative writing and hosted art workshops. Kristín created and curated the exhibition Barnabókaflóðið (The Children’s Book Flood) which was presented in the Baltic countries in the early 2020s. She has twice received the Icelandic illustration award Dimmalimm for books inspired by Norse mythology.

== Early life and education ==
Born in Reykjavik on 2 May 1968, Kristín Ragna completed her studies at Iceland's College of Arts and Crafts (Myndlista- og handíðaskóla Íslands) in 1992. She went on to study comparative literature and creative writing at the University of Iceland, graduating in 2006 and earning a master's degree in creative writing in 2016.

== Career ==
As a literary scholar, Kristín has held lectures on creative writing at the University of Iceland and participated in courses on illustrating children's literature at Iceland's Academy of the Arts. She has frequently hosted workshops at the Reykjavík School of Visual Arts.

As a writer and illustrator, she has published a number of children's books. She is recognized in particular for her books invoking Nordic mythology, combining contemporary interests with ancient myths. In particular, she has twice won the Dimmalimm prize for her illustrations, in 2009 for Örlög guðanna (The Fates of the Gods) and in 2012 for Hávamál (Sayings of the High One). In 2018, her book Úlfur og Edda was nominated for the West Nordic Council's Children and Youth Literature Prize.

Kristín has also arranged and curated exhibitions on Norse mythology, in particular Barnabókaflóðið (The Children’s Book Flood) was presented in the Baltic countries in the early 2000s. In March 2022, at the Jaipur Literature Festival she also made a presentation on her books relating to Nordic mythology.
