= Seita Vuorela =

Finnish author and photographer (1971–2015)

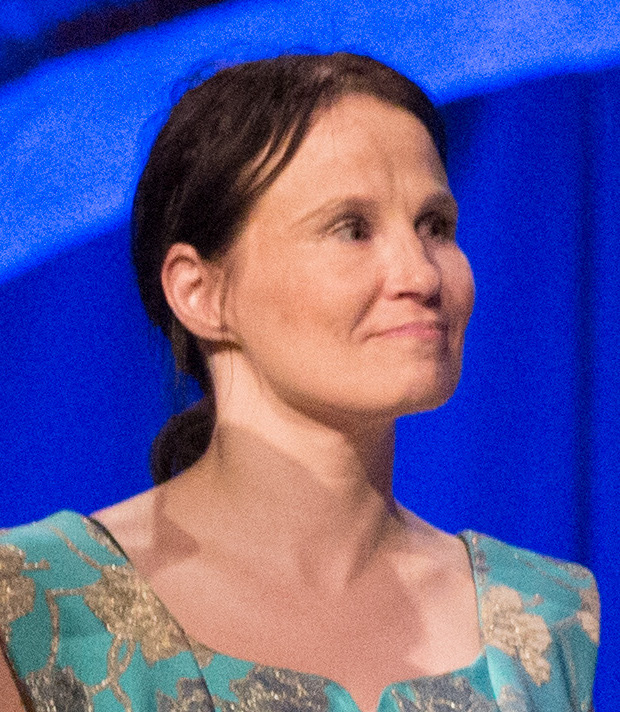
- Seita Vuorela in 2014
- Born: 15 March 1971; Sumiainen, Finland
- Died: 20 April 2015 (aged 44); Turku, Finland
- Occupations: Writer, photographer
- Writing career
- Language: Finnish

Seita Vuorela (formerly Seita Parkkola; 15 March 1971 – 20 April 2015) was a Finnish author of young adult novels and photographer.

== Studies and work ==
Seita Vuorela lived in Helsinki, where she worked as an author and photographer and taught creative writing. Her young adult novels have been translated into many languages, including Swedish, English, French, Italian, and German. She studied literature and philosophy at the University of Jyväskylä and the University of Turku.

== Prizes ==
She was nominated for the Finlandia Junior Award in 2002 and 2006. In 2011, she won the French prize Pépite du roman ado européen for her novel Viima. In 2013, she won the first ever Nordic Council Children and Young People's Literature Prize together with illustrator Jani Ikonen for the fantasy novel Karikko.

The book Lumi was nominee for the 2016 Finlandia Prize and was chosen as readers' favourite.

== Works ==
- Susitosi (2001), with Niina Repo
- Ruttolinna (2002), with Niina Repo
- Jalostamo (2004), with Niina Repo
- Viima (The School of Possibilities) (2006)
- Lupaus (2007), Rajat Express vol. 1, with Niina Repo
- Loisto (2008), Rajat Express vol. 2, with Niina Repo
- Usva (2009)
- Karikko (2012), with Jani Ikonen
- Lumi (2016), posthumous

== Awards ==
- Pépite du roman ado européen, 2011
- Nordic Council Children and Young People's Literature Prize, 2013
