= Kristin Roskifte =

Norwegian illustrator and author of picture books

- Born: 30 April 1975 (age 50)
- Occupations: Illustrator and children's writer
- Awards: Nordic Council Children and Young People's Literature Prize (2019)

Kristin Roskifte (born 30 April 1975) is a Norwegian illustrator and author of picture books.

== Biography ==
Roskifte was born on 30 April 1975.

She was awarded the Nordic Council Children and Young People's Literature Prize in 2019 for the picture book Alle sammen teller ("Everybody counts"). The jury praised the pictures in the book, and described the text as "poetic and humoristic". As of October 2019, Alle sammen teller had been translated into 27 languages.

Roskifte co-founded the picture book publishing house Magikon in 2007.

== Selected works ==
- Alt vi ikke vet. 2003. (picture book)
- 28 rom og kjøkken. 2004. (picture book)
- Still deg i kø. 2005. (picture book)
- Jorda rundt på 29 bokstaver. 2007. (essays)
- Mirandas skattkammer. 2008. (picture book, with Jan Kjærstad)
- 29 liv – Alf og Beate med familie og venner. 2009. (picture book)
- Leilighetsdikt. 2011. (poetry)
- Dyrenes skjønnhet. 2012. (picture book)
- Barnet mitt. 2015. (co-writer, with Hilde Hagerup)
- Alle sammen teller. 2018. (picture book)
