= Áslaug Jónsdóttir =

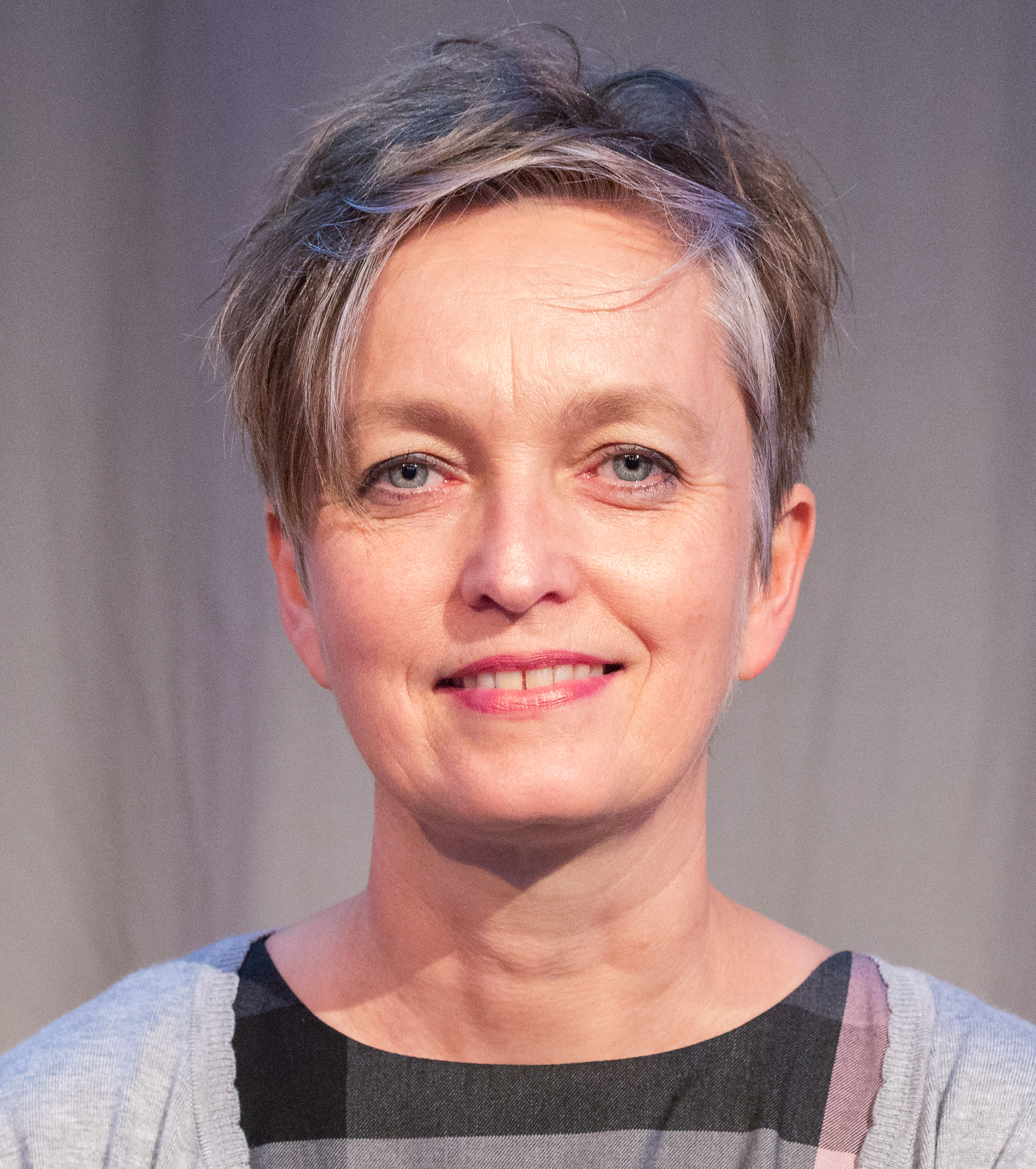
Jónsdóttir at the Göteborg Book Fair 2015

Áslaug Jónsdóttir (born 31 March 1963) is an Icelandic writer of children's books, illustrator and playwright.

== Early life and education ==
She grew up near Borgarfjörður in west Iceland and then attended Menntaskólinn við Hamrahlíð in Reykjavik. She then studied in Copenhagen, Denmark at Skolen for Brugskunst (later the School of Design of the Royal Danish Academy of Fine Arts).

== Career ==
She published her first children's picture book in 1990. Her recent work includes collaboration with two other authors Swedish Kalle Guettler and Faroese Rakel Helmsdal on a series of six "Monsters" books published in Icelandic, Swedish and Faroese, starting with Nei! sagði litla skrímslið (No! Said Little Monster) in 2004.

In 2002 she and Andri Snær Magnason collaborated on Sagan af bláa hnettinum which won the West-Nordic Children's Literature Prize. It has since been translated and published in English (The Story of the Blue Planet, 2013, Pushkin: ISBN 9781782690061), Danish, Faroese, German, Italian, Korean and Polish.

== See also ==
- List of Icelandic writers
- Icelandic literature
