= Bergrún Íris Sævarsdóttir =

Icelandic author and illustrator (born 1985)

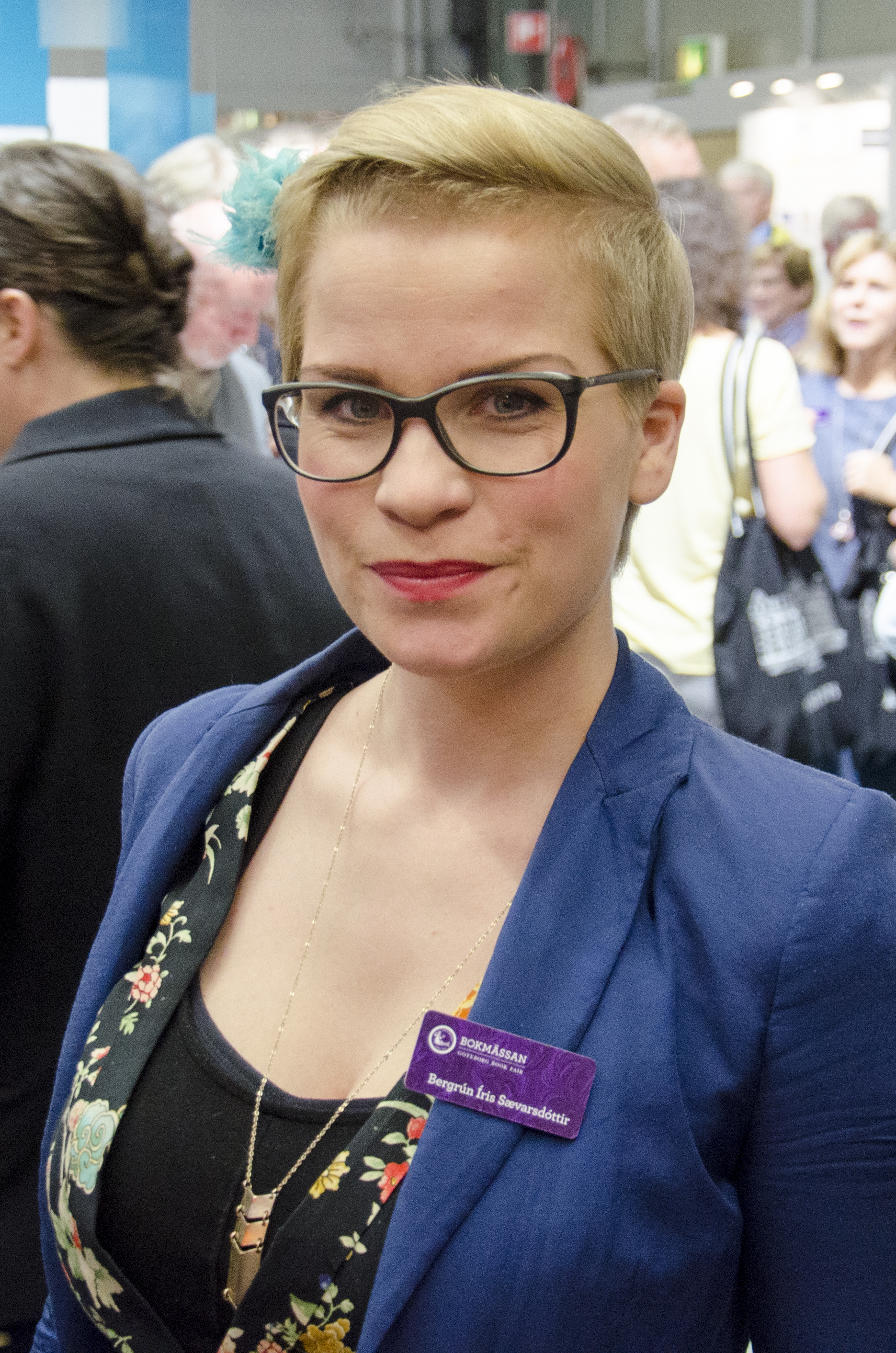
Bergrún Íris Sævarsdóttir in 2015

Bergrún Íris Sævarsdóttir (born 1985) is an Icelandic author and illustrator. In 2020, she won the Icelandic Literary Prize and the West Nordic Council's Children and Youth Literature Prize for her book Langelstur að eilífu.

== Works ==
- Töfralandið (2020)
- Kennarinn sem hvarf sporlaust (2020)
- Kennarinn sem hvarf (2019)
- Lang-elstur að eilífu (2019)
- Hauslausi húsvörðurinn (2019)
- Lang-elstur í leynifélaginu (2018)
- Næturdýrin (with Ragnheiður Gröndal) (2018)
- Lang-elstur í bekknum (2017)
- Viltu vera vinur minn? (2015)
- Sjáðu mig sumar (2015)
- Vinur minn, vindurinn (2014)
