= Bjørn Sortland =

Norwegian writer

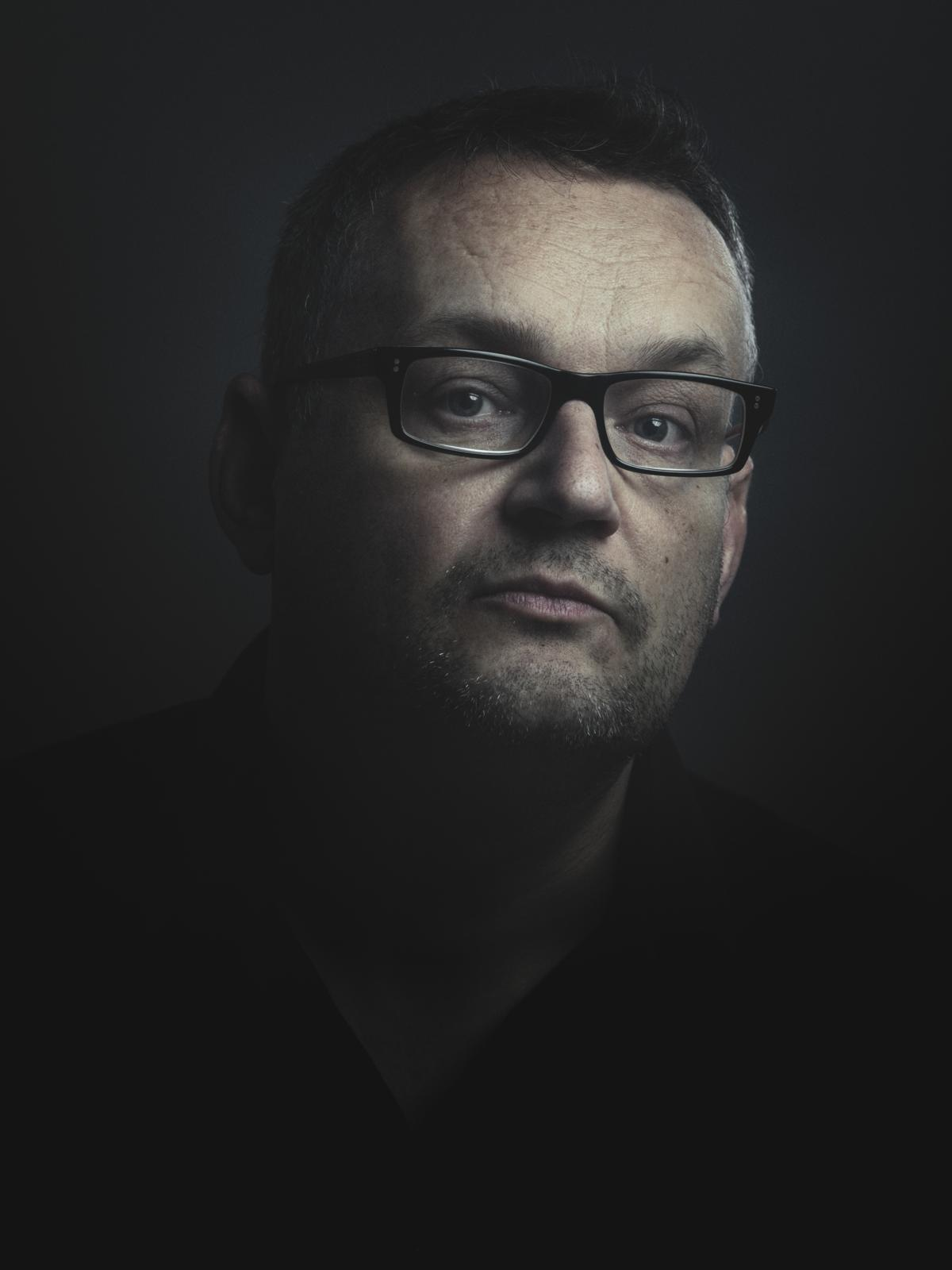
- Born: 1 May 1968 (age 58) noruega
- Occupation: Children's writer

Bjørn Sortland (born 1 May 1968) is a Norwegian writer for children and young adults.

== Biography ==
Sortland made his literary debut in 1992 with Det er ikkje natta, a book for young adults. His next book, Raudt, blått og litt gult (1993), a picture book jointly with illustrator Lars Elling, earned them the Deutscher Jugendliteraturpreis in 1996 and the Melsom Prize in 1994. Among his other books are Love light from 1996, and Alle har eit sultent hjerte, which earned him the Critics Prize for the year's best children's or youth's literature in 2008. He was awarded the Aschehoug Prize in 2011. He also made a book called "Kepler 62", which has released 6 different books.
