= Ville Tietäväinen =

Finnish graphic designer (born 1970)

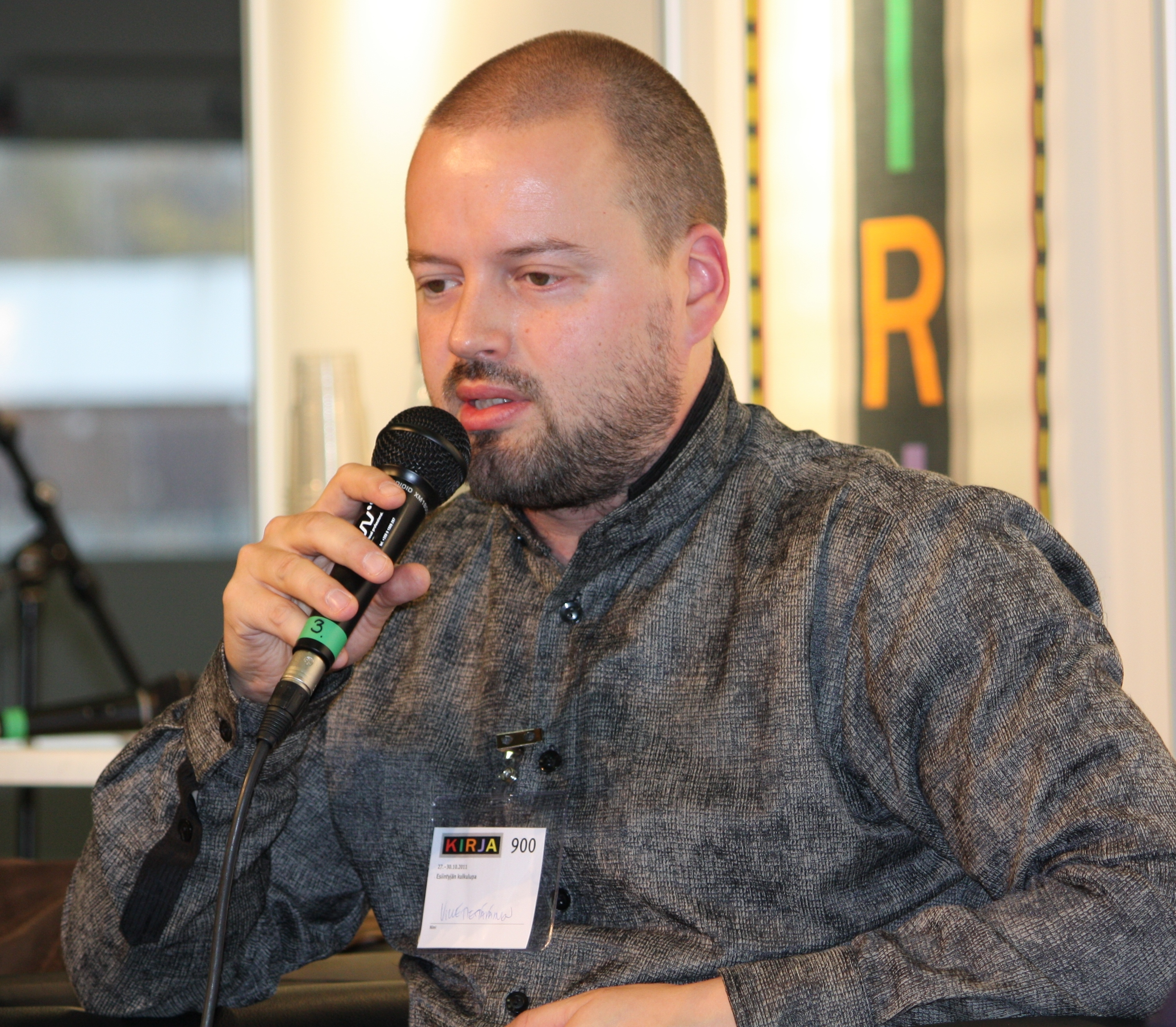
- Ville Tietäväinen at the Helsinki Book Fair in 2011
- Born: October 20, 1970 (age 56) Helsinki, Finland
- Areas: Comic book artist, illustrator, graphic designer
- Notable works: Näkymättömät kädet, 2011; Linnut ja meret, 2003
- Awards: Graphic Novel Finlandia Prize 2011

Ville Tietäväinen is a Finnish graphic designer, illustrator and comic artist. His first comic book Linnut ja meret was published in 2003. Tietäväinen graduated as an architect but he has worked as an illustrator and graphic designer since the 1990s.

Probably the most influential work by Tietäväinen is the Invisible Hands (Finnish: Näkymättömät kädet) comic book released in 2011. The book was the winner of Finnish Graphic Novel Finlandia Prize in the year 2011. Invisible Hands tells the grim story of a Moroccan tailor Rashid who faces economic difficulties in his home country and leaves his family to look for work in Spain as an illegal alien. The comic book deals with themes like social injustice, illegal immigrants and globalization.

== Works ==
- Näkymättömät kädet (2011)
- Linnut ja meret (2003)
- Hymyilevä kuu (1995, with Harri Hannula)
