= Karen Anne Buljo =

Norwegian author

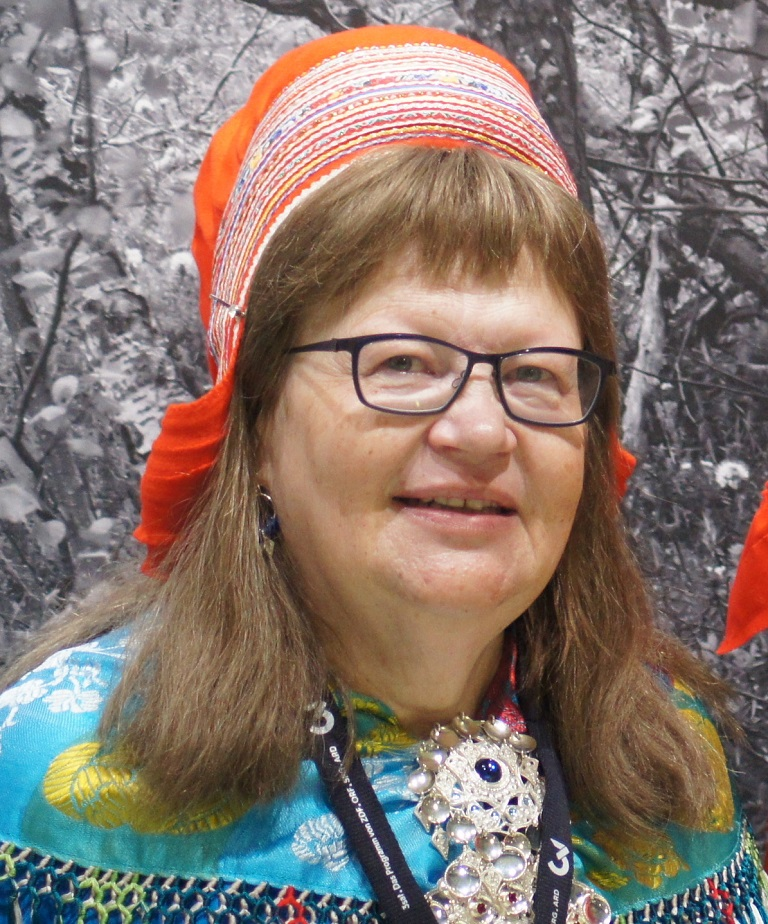
Karen Anne Buljo

Karen Anne Buljo (born 1 July 1964) is a Norwegian Saami author, who has authored over 10 books on children's literature and young adult literature in the Northern Sami language.
