= Kristín Helga Gunnarsdóttir =

Icelandic writer

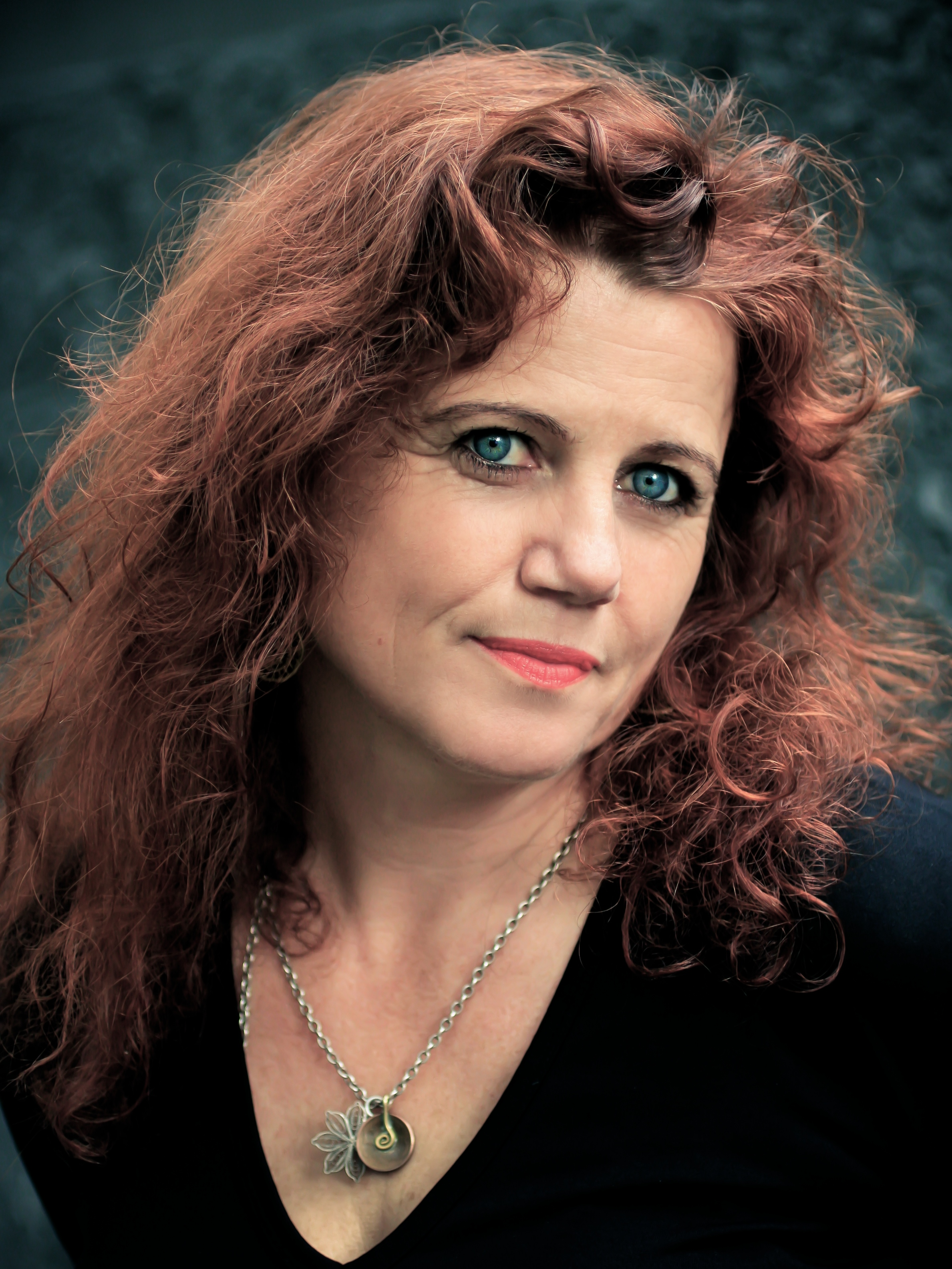
- Kristin Helga in 2015.
- Born: 24 November 1963 (age 62); Reykjavík, Iceland
- Education: University of Utah (1987, BA)
- Children: 3
- Writing career
- Genres: Children's books; YA
- Notable work: Fíasól children's book series
- Notable awards: West Nordic Council's Children and Youth Literature Prize 2008 Draugaslóð

Kristín Helga Gunnarsdóttir (born 24 November 1963) is an Icelandic writer, novelist, columnist and environmental activist.

She is best known for her series of children's books on the character Fíasól, first published in 2004, which has been translated into Russian. Krístin Helga has also written for theatre, radio and television and published.

Kristín Helga is a three time winner of the Icelandic Women's Literature Award and has been awarded the Reykjavík City Children's Book Award. In 2008 she was awarded the West Nordic Council's Children and Youth Literature Prize for her book Draugaslóð. She was nominated for the Nordic Council Literature Award in 2018 for Vertu ósýnilegur – Flóttasaga Ishmaels.

== Personal life ==
Kristín Helga studied Spanish at the University of Barcelona and University of Iceland. In 1987, she graduated from the University of Utah with a degree in media studies and Spanish literature. She has studied journalism and is a former radio and TV presenter for RÚV,, and reporter for Stöð 2 and Bylgjan.

Kristín Helga lives in Garðabær with her three children and spouse.

== Published works ==
=== Novels ===
The titles are in Icelandic:

- 1997 Elsku besta Binna mín
- 1998 Bíttu á jaxlinn Binna mín
- 1998 Keikó hvalur í heimsreisu
- 1999 Milljón steinar og Hrollur í dalnum
- 2000 Mói hrekkjusvín
- 2001 Í Mánaljósi
- 2002 Gallsteinar afa Gissa
- 2003 Strandanornir
- 2003 Loftur og gullfuglarnir
- 2004 Fíasól í fínum málum
- 2005 Fíasól í hosiló
- 2006 Fíasól á flandri
- 2007 Draugaslóð
- 2008 Fíasól er flottust
- 2009 Láki Máni og þjóðahyskið
- 2010 Fíasól og litla ljónaránið
- 2011 Ríólítreglan
- 2012 Grímsævintýri: Ævisaga hunds (lit. 'Adventure of Grímur: Biography of a dog')
- 2013 Mói hrekkjusvín–kúreki í Arisóna
- 2013 Láki Máni og letikeppurinn
- 2014 Mói hrekkjusvín–misskildir snillingar
- 2014 Láki Máni og montrassinn
- 2015 Landsmót hrekkjusvína
- 2015 Litlar byltingar
- 2018 Vertu ósýnilegur: Flóttasaga Ishmaels: a refugee's story, young adult novel (YA).
- 2019 Fjallaverksmiðja Íslands (transl. The Mountain Factory): YA novel.
- 2020 Fíasól og furðusaga um kött með krakka í maga (transl. Fíasól and a bizarre story of cat with a child in the tummy)
- 2021 Ótemjur (lit. 'Untamed'): young adult novel.

=== Stage ===
- 2010 Fíasól, stage play National Theatre of Iceland.
- 2017 Gallsteinar afa Gissa: stage play and musical. Akureyri Theater company.

=== Radio ===
- 2016 Gallsteinar afa Gissa: RÚV, a radio play.

== Awards ==
- A million stones and Willy in the valley, nominated for the Youngster's book award of Reykjavík city council, 2000
- Town artist of the year, Garðabær town council, 2000
- Moe the mischief, Reykjavík City Children's Literature Prize, 2001
- In the Moonlight, Children's book award, 2002, chosen by children library visitors
- Witches of the shore, Children's book award, 2004, children library visitors
- Witches of the shore, Icelandic IBBY award, 2004, International Board on Books for Young people
- Fíasól in the nook, Children's book award, 2006
- Fíasól, the wanderer, Children's book award, 2007
- Ghost trail (Draugaslóð), Westnordic Children's Literature Award, 2008.
- Red hat, short story, 2nd place in a ghost story competition, Reykjavík 2008
- Ghost trail, nominated for the Nordic Children's Book Prize, 2009
- Fíasól, the greatest, Children's book award, 2009.
- Story stone of IBBY 2009, International Board on books for young people. Awarded for career.
- Fíasól, play for the National Theatre of Iceland, nominated for the best stage play for children 2010
- Grissom Adventure, a dog's true life story, nominated for Women's Book Award, 2013
- Be invisible, a refugee story, Women's book award 2018, Reykjavík Book Award 2019 and nominated for Nordic Council Book award 2018.
- 2022 Ótemjur: Reykjavik Children's Book Award (Barnabókaverðlaun Reykjavíkurborgar)
