= Inga Sætre =

Norwegian illustrator and comics writer (born 1978)

- Born: 11 February 1978 (age 48); Ringsaker, Norway
- Occupations: illustrator and comics writer
- Awards: Brage Prize (2011)

Inga Sætre (born 11 February 1978) is a Norwegian illustrator and comic writer. She was born in Brøttum in Ringsaker Municipality.

Her first comic series was Møkkajentene: Pøh, published in 2002. She has made comic strips for the newspapers Morgenbladet and Aftenposten, and for the magazine Syn og Segn.

She was awarded the Brage Prize in 2011 for the comic novel Fallteknikk.

Awards
Preceded by Hilde Kvalvaag	Recipient of the Brage Prize for children and youth 2011	Succeeded by Kari Stai
Preceded by Liv Marit Weberg	Recipient of the Ministry of Culture Prize for Children's and Youth Literature; 2015	Succeeded by Torun Lian
