= Ny Vestergade 9 =

Building in Copenhagen, Denmark

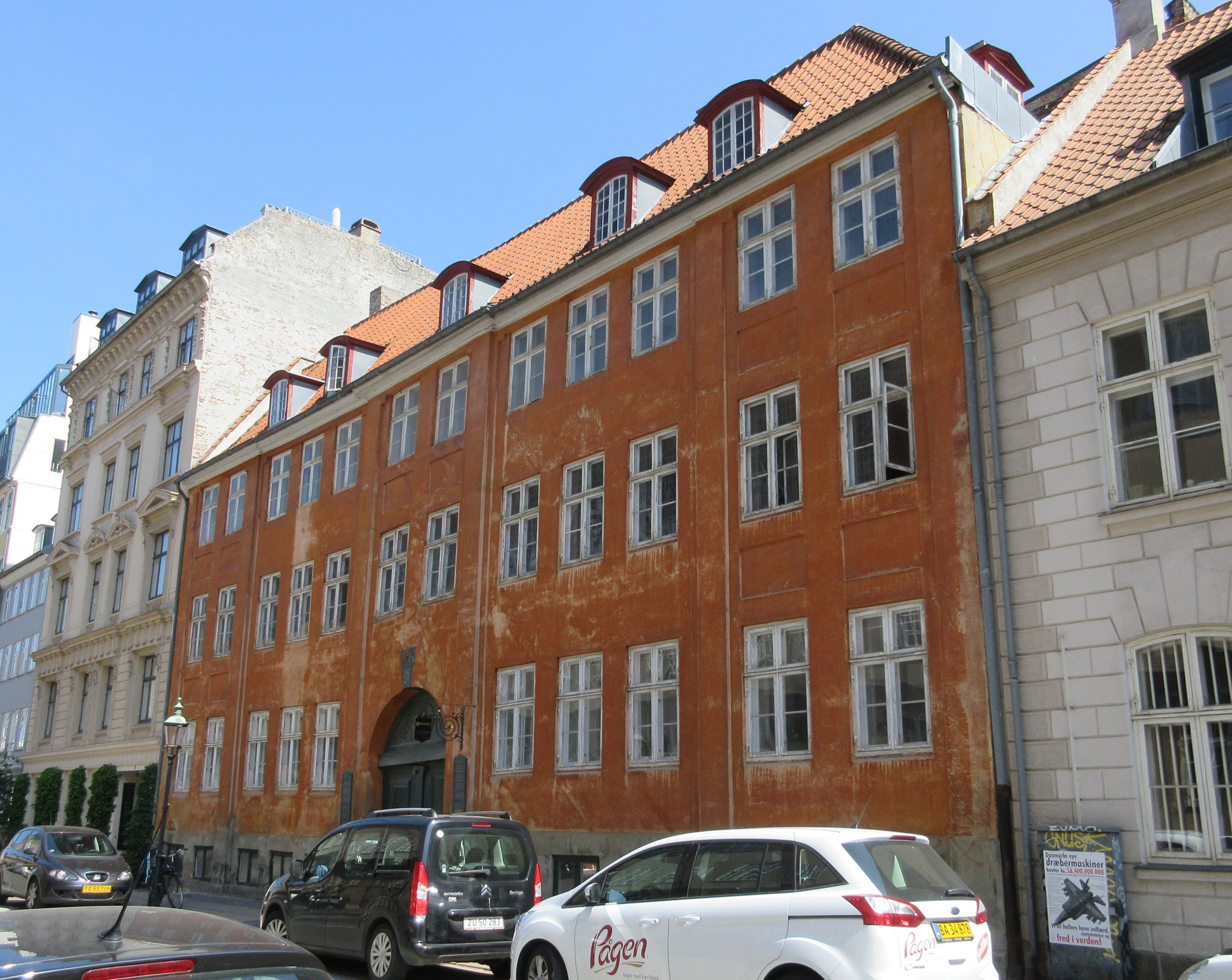
- Interactive map of the Ny Vestergade 9 area

General information
- Location: Copenhagen, Denmark
- Coordinates: 55°40′27.77″N 12°34′32.34″E
- Completed: C. 1700-1705
- Renovated: 1771-73

Ny Vestergade 9 is an 18th-century building located across the street from the main entrance to the National Museum in central Copenhagen, Denmark. Former owners include court painter Hendrick Krock, printmaker Hans Qvist, Royal Armourer Christian Kyhl and wholesaler Jacob Stilling-Andersen. The building was listed in the Danish Registry of Protected Buildings and Places in 1932.

== History ==
=== 17th century ===
The area was not reclaimed until the 1660s. Thomas Oxe, a merchant, was from 1689 the owner of two adjacent houses at the site. They contained a total of four tenancies. The house to the left (now No. 9) was upon his death in 1799 by his widow sold to Christian Siegfred von Plessen (1646-1723) who later that same year sold it to Jens Sørensen Kuur. Kuur served as councilman in Copenhagen from 1701 to 1716. He constructed a three-winged property at the site in circa 1700–05. The house had probably been intended for his daughter, who had married his friend, Magnus Berg, a Norwegian wood carver, but died a few months after the wedding. On 14 October 1706, Kuur sold the property to Peder Riegelsen. Riegelsen, a merchant who was active in the Iceland trade and also owned a brewery, was from 1794 one of the City's 32 Men.

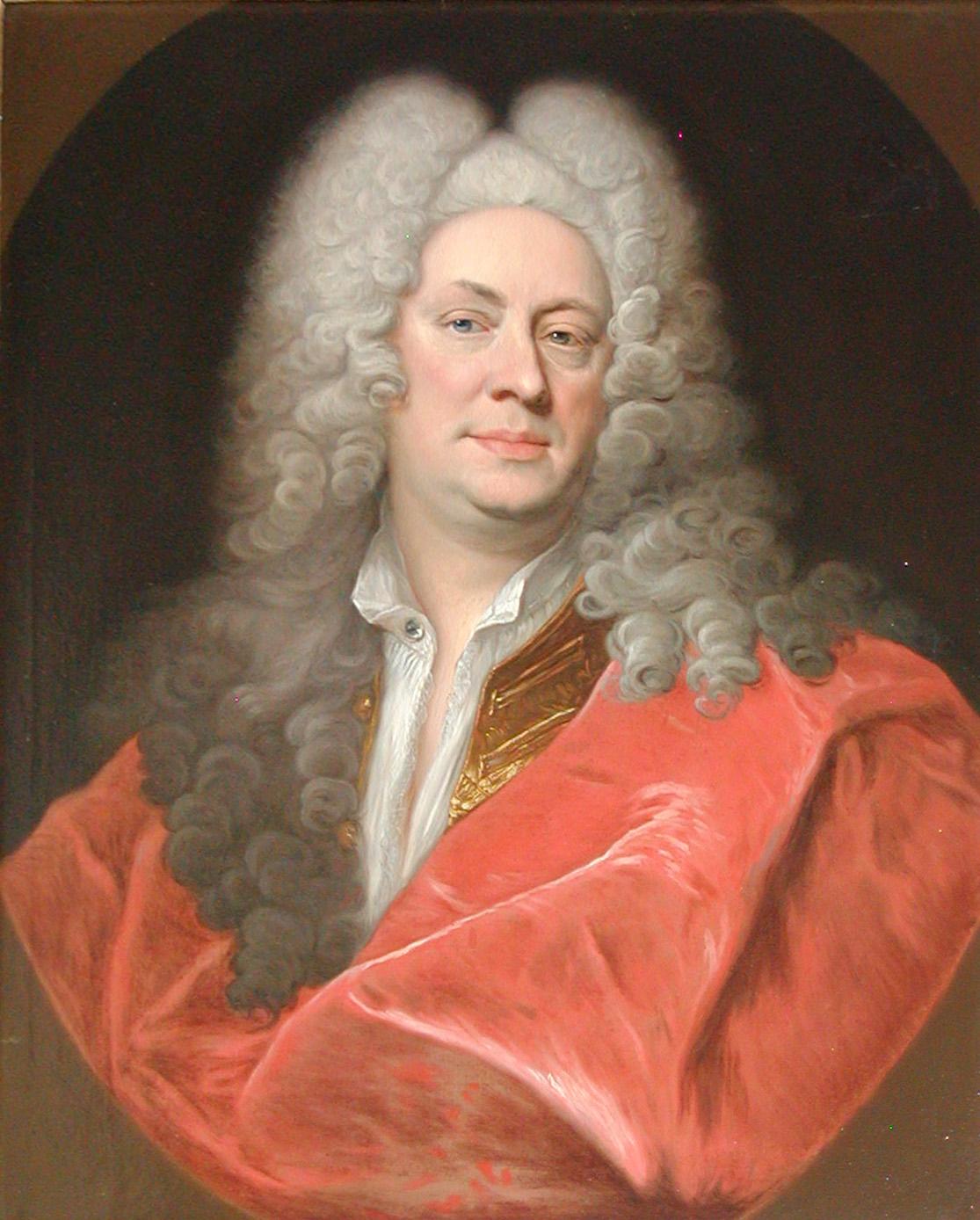
Hendrik Krock

On 16 July 1720, Riegelsen's widow sold the property to Court painter Hendrik Krock. Krock resided in the building for almost 20 years. He sold it in 1738 when he as president of the new Royal Danish Art Academy was granted an official residence at Bag Børsen. The new owner, Jacob Lund, worked at the Royal Mint.

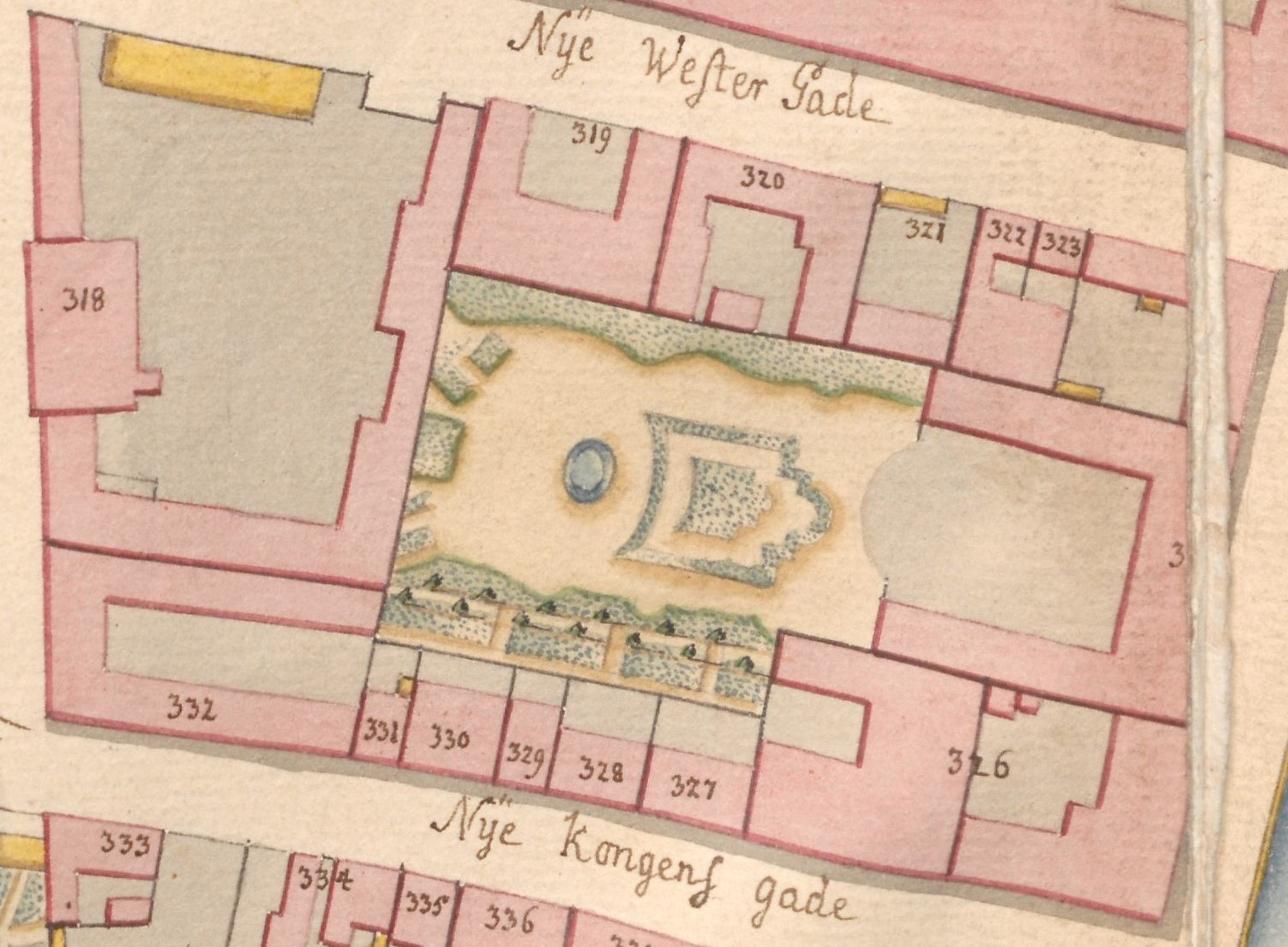
No. 32o seen in a detail from Christian Gedde's map of Copenhagen's West Quarter, 1757

In 1838, Krock sold the property to Johan Jacob Lund. In 1755, he sold the property to book binder Jacob Wilhelm Boppenhausen (1710-1761). He had succeeded his father as book binder at the Royal Danish Library in 1737. His property was listed in the new cadastre of 1756 as No. 320 in the West Quarter. On 19 December 1763, merchant Søren Jensen Cramer (1706-c.1774) purchased the building. He went bankrupt in 1772 and therefore had to sell it. The buyer, Hans Qvist, was a copperplate engraver.

=== 18th century ===
On 11 September 1797, Christian Kyhl, Royal Armourer at the Arsenal, purchased the property from Qvist. His building was home to a total of 27 residents in four households at the 1801 census. Kyhl resided in the large first-floor apartment with his wife and their five children. His wife died in 1808 and he was then married again the following year, possibly to his departed wife's younger sister, with whom he had three more daughters. He owned the property until his death in 1827.

Textile manufacturer Daniel Hartvig Drieser (1797-after 1870) purchased the property from Kyhl's estate in 1828. At the time of the 1850 census, the number of residents in the complex had increased to 43 people in six households.

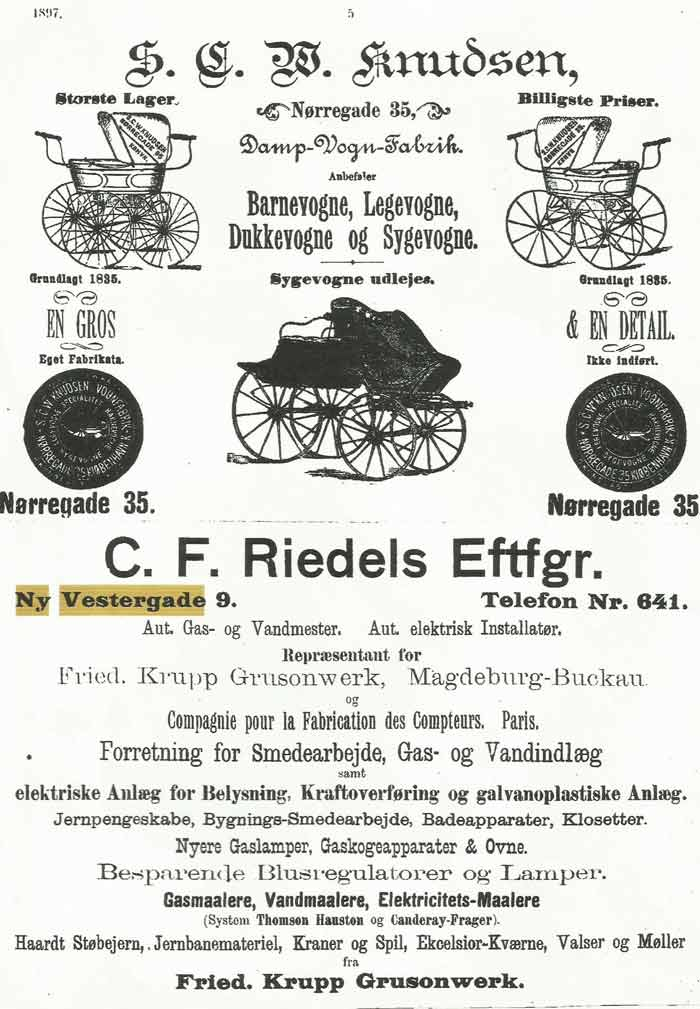
Advert for C. F. Riedels Eftf., 1897

Carl Frederik Riedel (1823-c. 1891), a master smith, purchased the building in February 1857. His family had lived there as tenants in the 1830s. Both his home and metal workshop was from then on based in the complex. In 1867, he was a co-founder of C. F. Riedel & Lindegaard iron foundry and machine factory on Kingosgade in Vesterbro.

Riedel's property was home to 39 residents at the 1880 census. Carl Frederik Riedel, a manufacturer, resided in one of the first-floor apartments with his wife Inger Christine Hansine Riedel, two of their children (aged 25 and 27) and one maid. Johanne Vilhelmine Fertysch, a widow, resided alone in the other first-floor apartment. Frederik Vilhelm Riedel, Eiedel's brother and also a master smith, resided in one of the second-floor apartments with his wife Emilie Marie Riedel, their four children (aged nine to 15) and one maid. Johan Henrik Lindhard, a master turner, resided in other second-floor apartment with his seven-year-old son Oskar Oxelberg Lindhard, his sister Thora Adelgunde Lindhard and the lodger Theodor Andreas Lindhard. Vilhelmine Hansine Saabye (née Harberg), a widow, resided in one of the ground-floor apartments with her two children (aged 10 and 13). Erich Christian Werlauff Steenbuch, am assistant at the University Laboratory, resided in the other ground-floor apartment with his wife Lene Jensine Frederikke Mathilde Steenbuch (née Bülow), their two-year-old daughter and a maid. Jens Nielsen, a workman, resided in the basement with his wife Anna Antoinette (née Jensen) and their five children (aged nine to 16). Andreas Christian Bennicke, a master painter, resided on the second floor of the side wing with his wife Nicoline Frederikke Bennicke and their six children (aged four to 25).

At the 1895 census, Riedel's widow had moved to Ordrup but was still the owner of the property in Ny Vestergade. Both Riedel's former company and the Ny Vestergade complex were the following year taken over by Johan C. B. Howitz (1855-1908). In 1901, all the residents (seven apartments) were associated the firm which was now operated under the name C. F. Riedels Eftf. ("C. F. Riedel's Successor"). Howitz's widow Ella Kirstine continued the company after her husband's death in 1908. In 1910, she married stage director Paul Søren Nielsen (1862-1931) in Hellerup. Ny Vestergade 9 was in 1918 sold to Jacob Stilling-Andersen, founder of the Danish Butter Export Union.

=== 20th century ===
On 20 March 1922, Stilling-Andersen sold it to house painter Osvald Kjeldsen. On 9 March 1925, he sold it to glazier Odin Hansen (1885-). His company, Aug. Duvier's Eftf., founded by August Duvier in 1885, was also based in the building. Hansen had owned it since 1918. Another company, Wilhelm Weincke, a tobacco company, was from 1939 also based at Ny Vestergade 9.

== Architecture ==
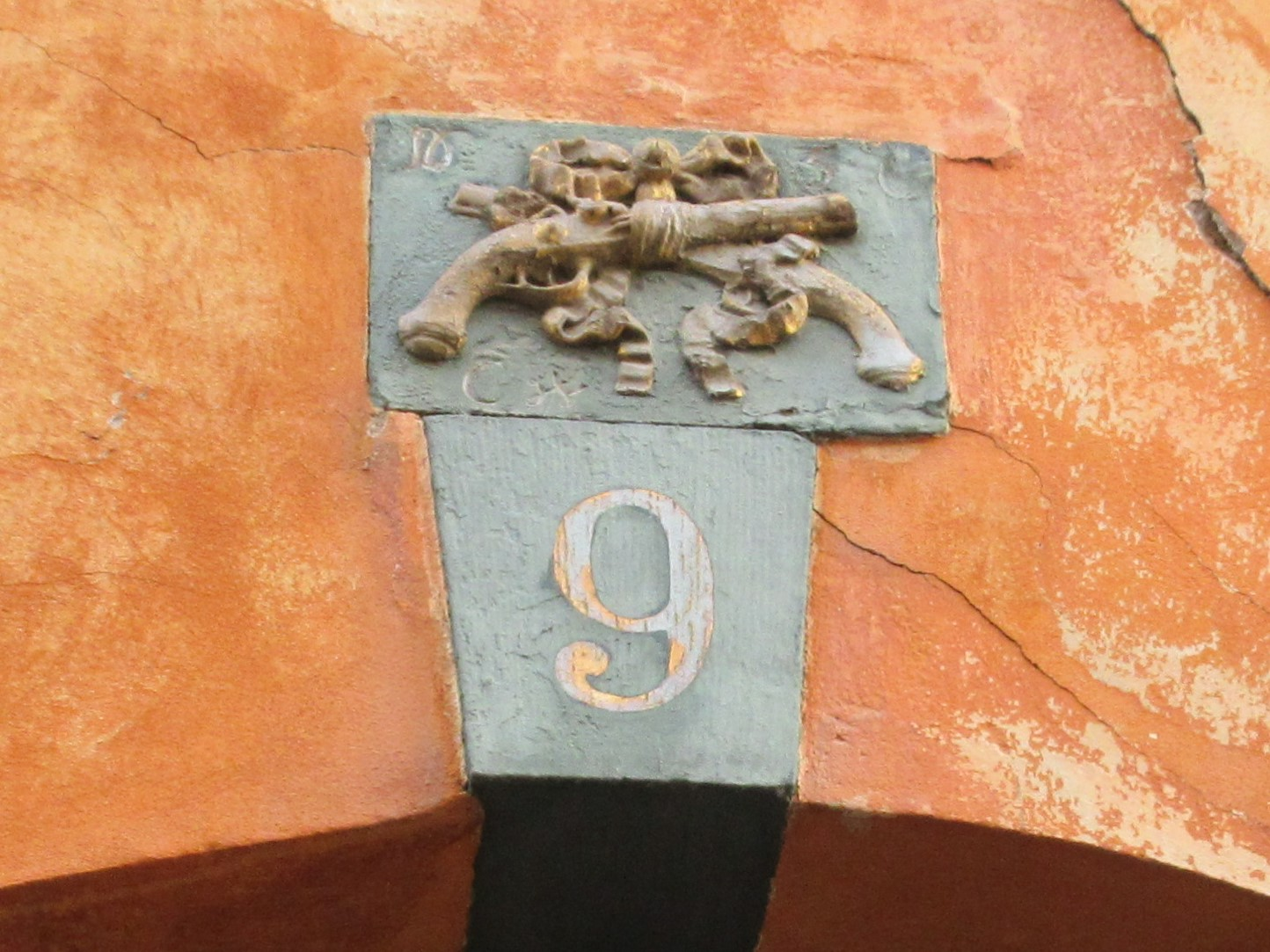
The key stone with the house number and the relief of two crossed pistols

The building consists of three floors and is 12 bays wide. A two-bay central gateway opens to a narrow courtyard flanked by two side wings. The complex was restored by architect Mogens Didriksen (1918-1991) in 1898.

A relief of two crossed pistols on the keystone above the gate dates from royal gunsmith Christian Vilhelm Wilcken Kyhl's years as owner in 1797.

== List of owners ==
- 1689-1699 Thomas Oxe
- 1699 Christian Siegfried von Plessen
- 1699-1706 Jens Sørensen Kuur
- 1706-1720 Peder Riegelsen
- 1720-1737 Hendrick Krock
- 1738-1755 Johan Jacob Lund
- 1755-1763 Jacob Wilhelm Boppenhausen
- 1763-1772 Søren Jensen Cramer
- 1772-1797 Hans Qvist
- 1797-1826 Christian Kyhl
- 1828-1856 Daniel Hartvig Drieser
- 1856-1896 Carl Frederich Riedel
- 1896-1918 Johannes Howitz
- 1918-1922 Jacob Stilling-Andersen
- 1922-1925 Osvald Kjeldsen
- 1925-1973 Odin Hansen
- 1973-2015 Jørgen Bloch Behrendt
- 2015-present: Nille Behrendt
