= Marianne Clausen =

Danish musicologist and choir conductor

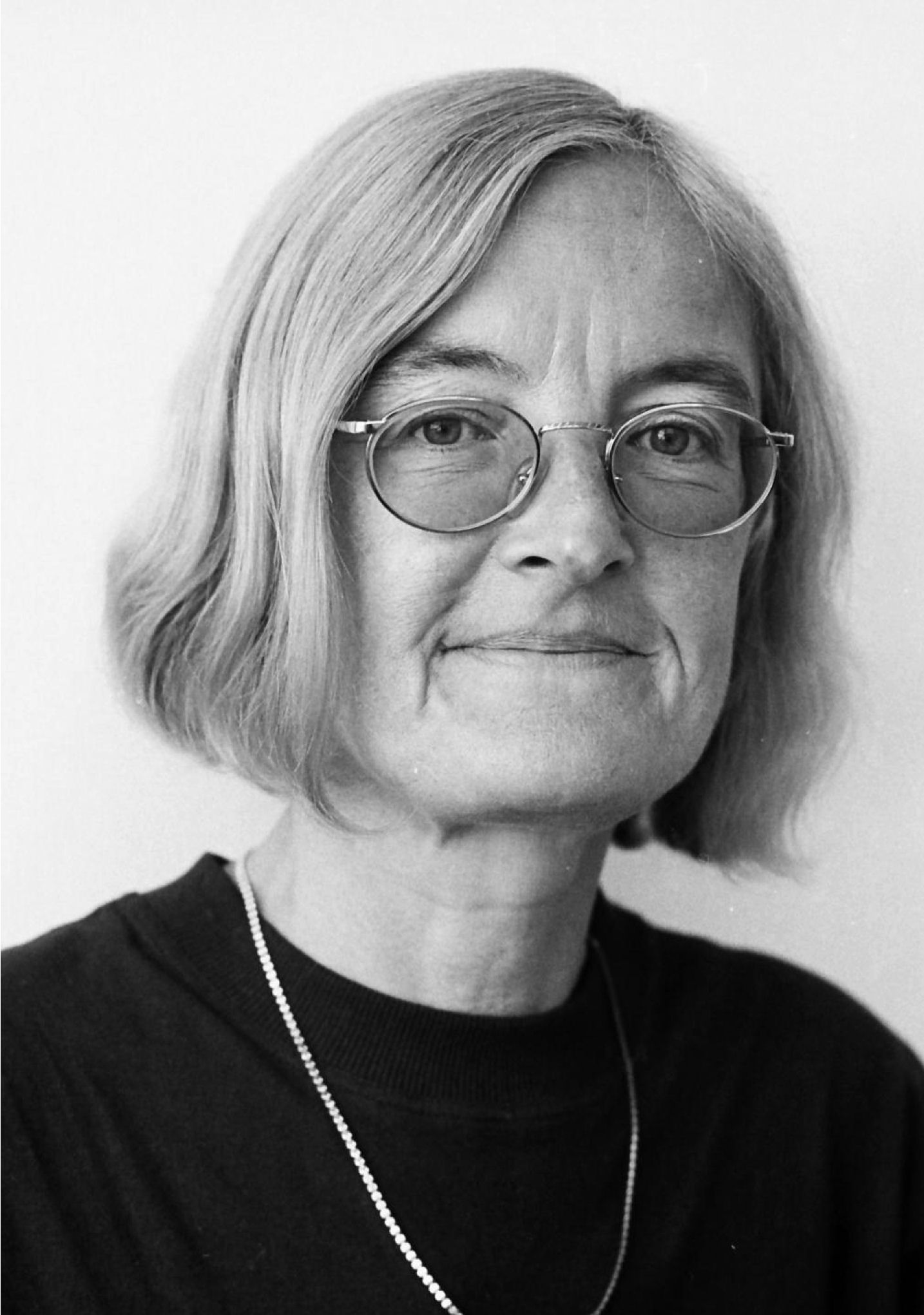
Marianne Clausen in 1995.

Marianne Clausen (25 December 1947 – 17 September 2014) was a Danish musicologist and choir conductor. She was the daughter of composer, choir conductor and musicologist Karl Clausen (1904–1972). Her main achievement, begun in collaboration with her father in the early 1970s, intensified during the 1990s, and concluded just weeks before her death, was the preservation of traditional Faroese folk singing, which she presented in a number of large volumes with music notation transcriptions of sound recordings. Based on more than 6,000 such recordings, collected by many different scholars, including herself, throughout the entire 20th century, she published around 3,350 music notation examples of various genres of traditional Faroese singing, together with hitherto unpublished song texts, as well as historical and musicological analyses.

Marianne Clausen also led and conducted several amateur choirs, most notably 1978-2000 the Faroese choir in Copenhagen, Húsakórið, and 1984-2013 the Danish choir Con Brio.

== Early works ==
The daughter of high school teachers Karl Clausen and Grethe Clausen, born Jensen, and the youngest of four siblings, Marianne Clausen grew up in a large rented apartment in the 18th-century villa “Stormly” on Godthåbsvej in the Copenhagen neighbourhood of Frederiksberg. During the 1950s, her father, by then a well-known choir conductor and musicologist, who had specialized in folk singing, gradually became aware of the very rich Faroese folk singing tradition. He went to the islands several times with a tape recorder to collect, first of all, examples of the religious, spiritual singing, known as Kingo-singing, which had so far not received much attention from collectors.

During trips with her father from the mid-1960s and onwards, Marianne Clausen was introduced to the Faroese people and their singing. Her father discovered that she possessed a special talent, surpassing his own, for writing down accurately and unbiased, as regards musical harmonics and scales, the melodies that were sung in the recordings. After his death she completed a volume containing 97 melody examples, with lyrics, of Faroese spiritual singing. Part of this volume she used as the thesis for her major degree in music from Aarhus University 1975. In c. 1983 she finished her MA degree by taking a minor in English from the University of Copenhagen. A little later she also passed the PO organist's exam.

Following her failed first marriage, which was insecure and traumatic, and the death of her father not long after, Marianne Clausen went through some years around 1980 with alcohol abuse. She managed to get out of the abuse in 1983, and she never touched alcohol again for the rest of her life. However, repercussions of the mental and physical damage from those events were probably at least partly responsible for her premature death many years later.

After some years where she recovered and mainly worked with choirs, she went on a number of collection trips to the Faroes 1988-94, which resulted in a publication about spiritual singing and one about Danish language ballads, Hundredesyv-visebogen The latter in particular gained positive attention among the Faroese, partly because it was the first publication for many years to deal with Faroese dance, the folk singing genre that had best withstood the modernization of the Faroese community in the decades after World War II, and was still thriving, as it is today, in various dance associations across the islands, as well as in the Faroese communities in Denmark.

Hundredesyv-visebogen was released on the 300th anniversary of Peder Syv’s songbook, which was itself inspired by Anders Sørensen Vedel’s songbook Hundredvisebog from a century earlier. Hundredesyv-visebogen was the last of Marianne Clausen's books based exclusively on her own collections of folk singing; her last five books were all primarily based on folk singing recordings by other, earlier collectors.

=== Regin Dahl recordings ===
Before embarking on her principal work (see next section), she undertook the project of writing down in music the compositions of Faroese poet and composer Regin Dahl (1918-2007). Over the years, Dahl had composed several hundred melodies, both to his own poetry and to that of other poets and authors, e.g. the Faroese Jákup Dahl, Hans A. Djurhuus, J.H.O. Djurhuus, Christian Matras, Jóannes Patursson, Mikkjal á Ryggi and Símun av Skarði, the Norwegians Knut Hamsun and Nordahl Grieg, the Dane Jeppe Aakjær and the Swedes Gustaf Fröding and Erik Axel Karlfeldt, as well as many others. Only in exceptional cases did Regin Dahl write his music down, but instead remembered it by heart, as was customary among the Faroese. Following the release in 1972 of a gramophone record with Regin Dahl songs, a good friend of his arranged for Regin Dahl to perform his entire musical production, by singing at the piano in a recording studio, which he did in 15 recording sessions between April 1973 and January 1977.

In the mid 1990s, Marianne Clausen had these recordings, as well as his gramophone records and other Regin Dahl recordings that emerged during the project, transferred to compact cassettes, her preferred media for music transcription in those years (from 2006 she mainly used an iPod), and transcribed and published 439 of Regin Dahl's melodies, together with lyrics. These were the last of her books with hand-written music transcriptions; for her next (and last) five books, she used music notation software.

== Faroese folk singing ==
At the middle of the 20th century, the isolated and still rather traditional way of life on the Faroe Islands caused traditional folk singing to flourish here for several decades longer than was the case in, say, Europe and North America, where a modernist outlook, combined with e.g. motion pictures and radio and later tv broadcasting, had largely replaced traditional way of life, and ousted folk singing.

The spreading of sound recording equipment among musicologists, from the 1890s the phonograph, and in particular from the 1940s the tape recorder, easy to carry and not too pricey, opened a time window of some decades, where Scandinavian and German musicologists brought modern technology to the Faroe Islands and recorded numerous examples of the islanders’ still vigorous folk singing tradition. With the introduction in the late 1950s of Faroese radio broadcasting, and in the late 1970s of television, traditional singing suffered a severe setback.

The few hundred folk singing examples recorded on phonograph wax cylinders in the first decades of the 20th century formed the basis for several scholarly studies of Faroese folk singing, whereas the several thousand examples recorded on tape recorder at the middle of the century paradoxically only resulted in a rather limited scholarly production.

=== Kvæði ===
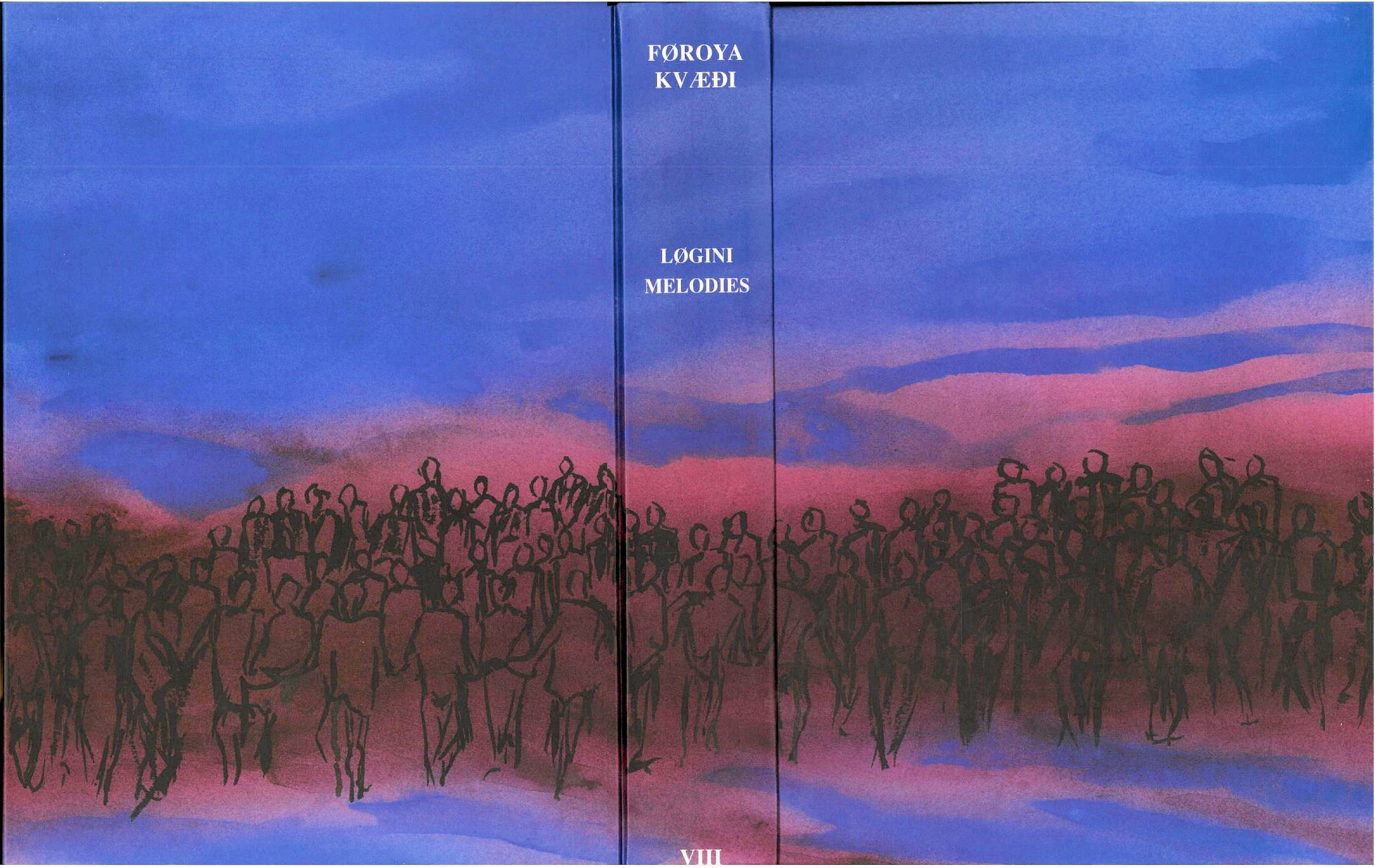
Book cover of Føroya Kvæði Volume VIII.

In 1998 Marianne Clausen began to collect from various Scandinavian archives sound recordings of Faroese kvæði (Faroese language ballads used in Faroese dance). After a registration check of the recordings (of who sings and what is sung), she began to make handwritten transcription drafts of all the recordings, with melody and lyrics, for the kvæði amounting to a total of 2,050 recordings.

Then she played all the recordings again, and compared them with the transcription drafts, checking for errors or mishearings; and when she was finished, she played all the recordings one more time, checking again. During this repeated process, which she also used in her next books, she began to select melodies to be included in the book manuscript. She based this selection on criteria, which ensured that the various kvæði texts and melodies were comprehensively represented, as regards persons, geography and time (recordings from as many islands and villages as possible, with special focus on renowned singers with large repertoires, and new recordings as well as old, sometimes rather indistinguishable phonograph recordings, in some cases dating back to 1902).

In 2003, Marianne Clausen's work with the kvæði recordings resulted in the eighth and conclusive volume, Føroya kvæði VIII, Løgini / Melodies of the magnum opus Føroya kvæði, the first seven volumes of which were published 1941-54, 1963–72 and 1996, containing the lyrics of 236 Faroese kvæði, with indexes. This volume is the biggest of her books, containing 1,343 melody transcriptions.

=== Spiritual singing ===
Whereas the Faroese dance with its Faroese kvæði and Danish ballad singing was used in a secular context in the traditional Faroese community, the religious side of people's lives was largely reflected in the widespread spiritual singing and Kingo-singing, called so after Danish bishop and hymn-writer Thomas Kingo (1634-1703), whose hymnal from 1699 was still widely used among the Faroese until the middle of the 20th century, as were the religious songs of Norwegian Petter Dass (1647-1707) and several other Baroque hymn-poets. The melodies used in this genre of singing may often be traced back to the ones in Kingo's melody collection, or Gradual, from 1699, but after having lived for two-and-a-half centuries among generations of Faroese folk singers, the melodies had often evolved into something very melismatic, and rhythmically and harmonically quite complicated, sometimes almost meditative.

In the fall of 2003, Marianne Clausen resumed the work with spiritual singing melodies, which she had begun more than 30 years earlier, together with her father. Based on music transcriptions of 1,350 melody examples, she chose 768 examples to be presented in her next volume from 2006, Andlig vísuløg í Føroyum - Spiritual Songs in the Faroes.

=== Danish ballads ===
Until a century or two ago, dances similar to the Faroese chain dance were in use across Europe, often to lengthy ballad texts, similar to kvæði. Danish ballad texts were often of Medieval origin, as appears from the magnum opus Danmarks gamle Folkeviser. The texts often relate historical events from the 12th to 15th centuries, and the collection of these Danish texts began in the middle of the 16th century, often by noblemen and -women. From the late 16th century and onwards, printed ballad text collections appeared, and also found their way to the Faroe Islands. Here, the Danish ballads came to form an integral part of the repertoire of Faroese dance.

During her collection trips for spiritual songs in the late 1980s, Marianne Clausen discovered that a great many Danish ballads were still in use among Faroese folk singers, and during seven additional trips 1991-93 she visited 45 singers and managed to collect 650 melody examples to 161 ballad texts, as well as other songs in Danish. Her own recordings, combined with those of earlier collectors, formed the basis for her next volume, published 2010, Vísuløg í Føroyum - Danish Folk Ballads in the Faroes. From the total of 1,846 recordings she chose 935 to be published in this book.

=== Skjaldur and rhymes ===
A certain genre of Faroese songs had for long passed rather unnoticed among scholars, namely the skjaldur and rhymes, often used in the upbringing of children, whether as lullabies for babies or, for elder children, as language exercises or guidance to everyday life, but also as funny or quite often somewhat ghastly or creepy texts.

In her fourth and last book with melody transcriptions, Skjaldur, rímur og ramsur - Faroese Skjaldur and Rhymes, from 2012, she published 310 melody transcriptions of skjaldur and rhymes, selected from 450 recordings, as well as many hitherto unpublished lyrics.

=== Sound of the Faroes ===
The four above-mentioned books, produced in the years 1998-2012, deal with all genres of Faroese folk singing, so at this point, Marianne Clausen's work with preserving and publishing these folk melodies was finished. She was, however, called on by many to write a primer, or textbook, which could be used in music teaching, in the Faroes and elsewhere, about Faroese folk singing. This resulted in her last book, Føroya ljóð - Sound of the Faroes from 2014, like her four previous books with cover painted by Tróndur Patursson, and with text only on the book spine. Here she presented 280 of her previously published melody examples, and used them in a discussion of, among other things, the tonality of the melodies, which is briefly referred below.

=== Tonality ===
Prior to Marianne Clausen's work, the tonality of the Faroese kvæði melodies were treated in two important studies, by Hjalmar Thuren in 1908 and by Hakon Grüner-Nielsen in 1945. Thuren classified the kvæði melodies as based on the pentatonic scale, while Grüner-Nielsen focused on Church modes as the origin. Marianne Clausen concluded that they were both right (or wrong): kvæði melodies, as well as melodies to Danish ballads, have a distinctly pentatonic nature, dominated by thirds, but are also strongly influenced by Church modes, in particular Dorian and Mixolydian, but also Phrygian. Concerning dance melodies, she noted some significant differences between melodies for Danish ballads and kvæði melodies: the melodies for Danish ballads are often more melodic than those for kvæði, they use three four time more frequently, and are often sung at ‘half speed’, as regards the number of text syllables compared to the number of steps in the dance, when compared to kvæði melodies.

Melodies for spiritual singing have a highly varied tonal material, including major and minor scales, but are also strongly influenced by Church modes, that are believed to stem from Gregorian chant from when the Faroese were Catholics, in the 16th century and earlier.

Skjaldur melodies are typically based on series of thirds, and may be regarded as parts of the pentatonic scale. The melodies are meant for children, and therefore quite simple, but nevertheless contain traces of Church modes, in particular Dorian and Phrygian.

Marianne Clausen concluded her last book with the words: “The [Faroese folk singing] genres complement each other and form a coherent musical universe, which is specifically Faroese”.

=== Renowned singers ===
A total of 456 Faroese folk singers contributed melody examples to the 3,350 music transcriptions in the four books of Marianne Clausen's magnum opus. Many singers only contributed a few examples, whereas some renowned singers mastered very large repertoires. The table below lists singers that contributed 50 or more melody examples.

Name	Biography	No. of melody examples
Albert á Høgugeil (Albert Djurhuus)	Born in Sumba 1912, died 1999, lighthouse keeper in Akraberg	234
Tróndur við Á	Born in Velbastaður 1901, died 1978, king's tenant	149
Bjarni í Steinhúsinum (Bjarni Vestergaard)	Born in Sumba 1931, shipmaster	131
Martin Tórgarð	Born in Tórshavn 1925, sailor, nephew of Marie Eide Petersen	128
Jens Ludvík í Stórhúsi (Jens Ludvig Johannesen)	Born in Dalur 1918, died 1999, udalman	76
Venzel á Velbastað (Samuel Wenzel Andreasen)	Born in Velbastaður 1866, died 1958, crofter and stonecutter, father of Juul á Velbastað	74
Mortan á Fløttinum (Morten Christian Holm)	Born in Hvalba 1892, died 1972, shipmaster	65
Jógvan á Trøð (Joen Trondesen)	Born in Skálavík 1889, died 1983, labourer, brother of Leifur Tróndarson	63
Marius í Katrinarstovu (Marius Jóanesarson)	Born in Funningur 1873, died 1939, boat builder	61
Marie Eide Petersen	Born in Nólsoy 1894, died 1994, teacher, aunt of Martin Tórgarð	60
Dánjal í Búðini (Dánjal Pauli Danielsen)	Born in Velbastaður 1919, died 2010, member of the Landsstýri	59
Magnus Pauli á Kvíggjarhamri (Magnus Pauli Magnussen)	Born in Tjørnuvík 1877, died 1961, king's tenant in Saksun	58
Juul á Velbastað (Vilhelm Juul Andreasen)	Born in Velbastaður 1902, died 1977, stonecutter, son of Venzel á Velbastað	53
Leifur Tróndarson á Trøð (Leif Trondesen)	Born in Skálavík 1901, died 1980, teacher, brother of Jógvan á Trøð	52
Dávur Emil í Tjørnuvík (David Emil Magnussen)	Born in Tjørnuvík 1881, died 1957, fisherman	51

== Choirs ==
Marianne Clausen's first choir was the one she founded among villagers in Kvívík on the Faroese island of Streymoy, where she lived 1970-71. Later she moved to Tórshavn, where she taught music at the teachers’ college.

It was important to her, that ordinary people, without any professional musical training, were also allowed to enjoy the excitement and pleasure of performing music, and over the years she became very good at selecting choir music that was of high quality and at the same time not too difficult for amateurs to master. She never used admission examination for new choir members, but allowed potentially talented singers with mediocre singing skills the necessary time to improve, under her close watch.

=== Húsakórið 1978-2000 ===
A few years after its foundation in 1971, Marianne Clausen took over Húsakórið, a mixed choir associated with the Faroese House in Copenhagen, whose members then were mainly young Faroese who had moved to Copenhagen to study, as well as Faroese who had settled there. In Marianne Clausen's years, the repertoire was, as it is today, dominated by Faroese compositions, including arrangements of Faroese folk melodies, but also much Scandinavian music was on the repertoire.

In 1993, Marianne Clausen arranged for Húsakórið and the dance association Fótatraðk to go on a tour to north-west Poland, following an idea put forward by Fótatraðk: Near the town Wolin, German archaeologists in the 1930s discovered the remains of the Viking stronghold Jomsborg. The Faroese kvæði repertoire contains a much used text about the inhabitants here, the Jomsvikings, and the purpose of the Polish tour was for the two Faroese music ensembles to perform, among other things, this kvæði on the Jomsborg site, as it were, roughly a millennium after the Viking stronghold ceased to exist. - In the following years, Marianne Clausen took Húsakórið on several similar tours to Poland.

=== Con Brio 1984-2013 ===
Marianne Clausen founded Con Brio, a mixed choir of amateur singers. Over the years, the choir steadily grew, both in number of members and singing skills, and was, from the mid 1990s and onwards, able to take up larger pieces, like Orff's Carmina Burana, Vivaldi's Gloria, and Dvorak's Mass in D major. In 2012, the choir made a Danish first performance of Karl Jenkins' mass The Armed Man. Roughly every second year in the period 1994-2013, Con Brio went on a three-day concert tour in the spring to various places in the north-west part of Poland, tours that were very popular and much loved, both by choir members and Polish audiences. Marianne Clausen's choice of music for the choir was very international, and spanned many centuries, including both sacred and secular music.

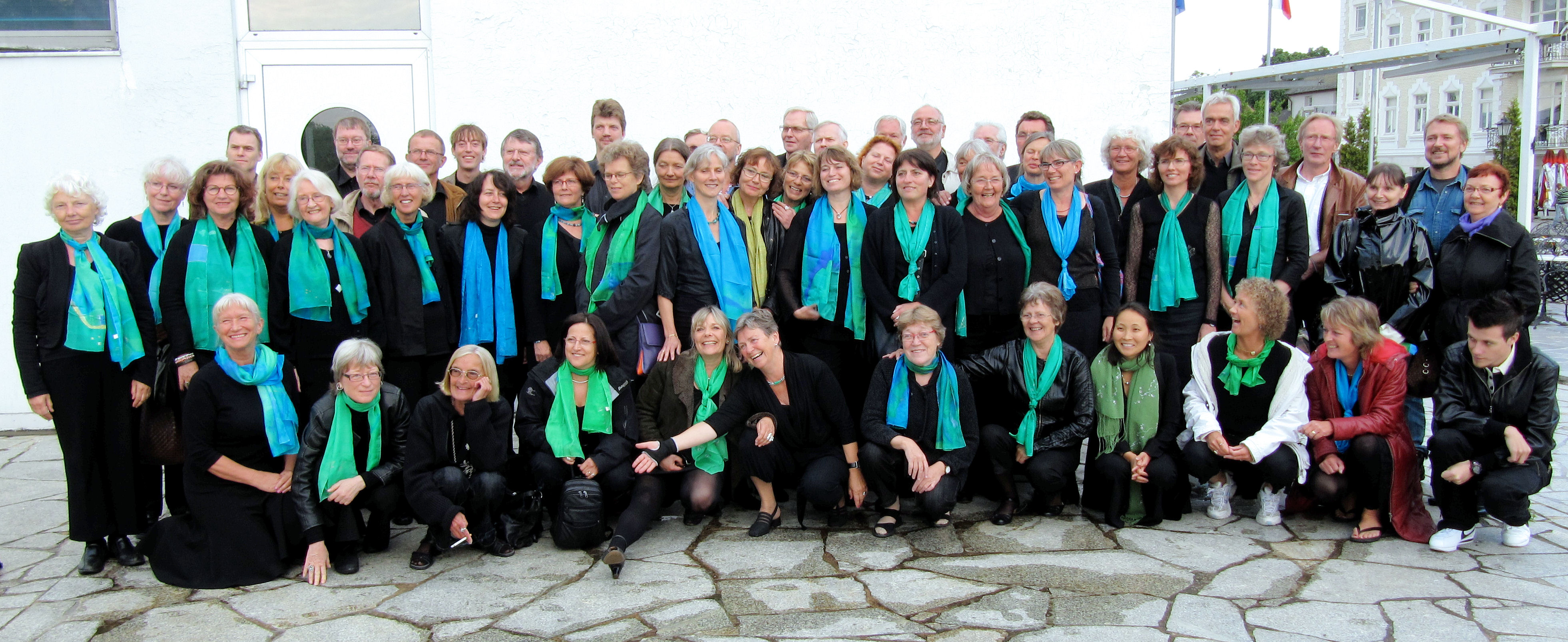
The Con Brio choir in Poland June 2009. Marianne Clausen is 3rd from left in front row, with cigarette.

During her later years, Marianne Clausen was increasingly weakened by stress, anxiety and lack of appetite. Sadly, her Christmas concert with Con Brio in December 2013 turned out to be her last performance.

== Quotations ==
Besides being a diligent and meticulous as well as very productive scholar, Marianne Clausen possessed a both enthusiastic and empathic personality, which was much admired, as reflected by these statements about her:

Her lifework easily outweighs the achievements of ten scholars. - Hanus Kamban, her Faroese linguistic counsellor (obituary in Politiken, 13 Oct. 2014)

When we are forgotten, and nobody knows about us, and what we did of good and bad, then generation after generation of Faroese will mention Marianne. - Zakarias Wang, her publisher (email, 25 Dec. 2014)

Marianne was a live wire, she was lively and funny to be with, but at the same time also determined. Which meant that you always knew where you had her, and you were always aware of what it was she wanted. - John Dalsgarð, her layouter (memorial speech given at Norðurlandahúsið in Tórshavn, 22 Nov. 2014)

To be a member of her choir was more than just singing. You became part of a fellowship, you became friends, especially with her. - Lars Østergaard, bass singer in Con Brio (obituary in Politiken, 9 Oct. 2014)

She was the most faithful friend, one could have. - Elsuba Iversen, longtime friend (pers. comm., late Sept. 2014)

Very few scholars manage to both produce basic research that is respected by the scholarly community, and to inspire wider circles to artistic and social performance. Marianne succeeded in that. It doesn’t get any bigger. - Marita Akhøj Nielsen, chairman of the UJDS publishing society (speech given at memorial ceremony in Føroyahúsið in Copenhagen, 10 Feb. 2015)

When I joined the Con Brio choir and met Marianne, it was like coming home. - Anita Bæk, soprano singer in Con Brio (pers. comm., 2 Aug. 2015)

== Bibliography ==
Karl Clausen og Marianne Clausen (1975): Åndelig Visesang på Færøerne, in: Fra Færøerne : Úr Føroyum, vol. VII-VIII, 205 pp, w. gramophone record, Dansk-Færøsk Samfund (contains 97 melody transcriptions of spiritual singing). Book reviews:

Marianne Clausen (1989): Karl Clausens optagelser af åndelig visesang og Kingosang på Færøerne 1967-1973 • Registrering ved Marianne Clausen; 180 pp. (Unpublished index to recordings)

Marianne Clausen & Jógvan Thomsen (1990): Åndelige viser og sange / Andaliga vísur og sangir, 31 pp, w. gramophone record (contains 14 recordings, with music transcriptions). Book review:

Marianne Clausen (1991): Åndelig visesang og Kingosang på Færøerne • Registrant • Bånd optaget og registreret af Marianne Clausen i årene 1988, 1989 og 1990; 52 pp. (Unpublished index to recordings)

Marianne Clausen (1995): Hundredesyv-visebogen - Danske folkeviser og andre viser på dansk med færøske melodier, 280 pp, w. compact cassette, H.N. Jacobsens bókahandil (contains 250 melody transcriptions of Danish ballads). Book reviews:

Regin Dahl (1996): Atlantsløg, edited by Marianne Clausen and Zakarias Wang, 282 pp, Stiðin (contains 369 melody transcriptions). Book review:

Regin Dahl (1997): Atlantsløg II, edited by Marianne Clausen and Zakarias Wang, 69 pp, Stiðin (contains 70 melody transcriptions)

Marianne Clausen (2003): Føroya Kvæði VIII, Løgini/Melodies (FK VIII), 735 pp, Universitets-Jubilæets Danske Samfund, No. 559, Stiðin (contains 1,343 melody transcriptions of kvæði singing). Book review:

Marianne Clausen (2006): Andlig Vísuløg í Føroyum / Spiritual Songs in the Faroes, 542 pp, Stiðin (contains 768 melody transcriptions of Faroese Kingo-singing and spiritual singing). Book reviews:

Marianne Clausen (2010): Vísuløg í Føroyum / Danish folk ballads in the Faroes, 506 pp, Universitets-Jubilæets Danske Samfund, No. 573, Stiðin (contains 935 melody transcriptions of Danish folk ballads). Book reviews:

Marianne Clausen (2012): Skjaldur, rímur og ramsur – Orð og løg / Faroese Skjaldur and Rhymes – Lyrics and Melodies, 257 pp, Stiðin (contains 310 melody transcriptions of Faroese skjaldur). Book reviews:

Marianne Clausen (2014): Føroya Ljóð / Sound of the Faroes, 319 pp, with two cds, Stiðin (primer with 280 of her previously published melody transcriptions). Book reviews:

== Articles ==
Karl Clausen (1958): Dansk folkesang gennem 150 år, Statsradiofoniens Grundbøger, Fremad, 338 pages; in the 1975 reprint by Tingluti Forlag, Marianne Clausen contributed to the epilogue, on p. 344-346

Marianne Clausen (1990): Kingo-sang og Petter Dass-sang på Færøerne, p. 65-66 in: Jan Kløvstad (ed.): Árbók 1990 Norðurlandahúsið í Føroyum

Marianne Clausen (2000): Åndelig visesang og Kingosang på Færøerne, p. 79-100 in: Hymnologiske Meddelelser, 2000, no. 1, Salmehistorisk Selskab og Nordisk Institut for Hymnologi

Marianne Clausen (2000): Åndelig visesang - en del af forfatternes kulturelle ballast, p. 35-45 in: Malan Marnersdóttir & Turið Sigurðardóttir (eds.): Úthavsdagar (Oceaniske dage), Annales Societatis Scientiarum Færoensis Supplementum XXIX, 221 pp, Føroya Fróðskaparfelag and Nordens Hus på Færøerne, ISBN 99918-41-29-6

Marianne Clausen (2006): Spiritual Songs and Kingo Singing in the Faroe Islands, p. 197-226 in: Kirsten Sass Bak & Svend Nielsen (eds.): Spiritual Folk Singing – Nordic and Baltic Protestant Traditions, 284 pp, Forlaget Kragen, ISBN 87-89160-11-8

Ole Brinth, Peter Balslev-Clausen, Sigvald Tveit, David Scott Hamnes, Guðrun Laufey Guðmundsdóttir, Marianne Clausen, Folke Bohlin & Erkki Tuppurainen (2008): Melodierne til Luthers salmer i Norden, p. 449-534 in: Sven-Åke Selander & Karl-Johan Hansson (eds.): Martin Luthers psalmer i de nordiska folkens liv, Arcus, Lund, ISBN 978-91-88553-16-4

Marianne Clausen (2008): Den færøske Luther-sang, p. 583-590 in: Sven-Åke Selander & Karl-Johan Hansson (eds.): Martin Luthers psalmer i de nordiska folkens liv, Arcus, Lund, ISBN 978-91-88553-16-4

== Awards ==
- 2012 - Heiðursgáva Landsins (Honorary award of the Faroe Islands)
- 2010 - Heiðursbræv Musikklærarafelagsins (Honorary letter of the Faroese Music Teachers' Association)
- 2003 - Mentanarvirðisløn M. A. Jacobsens (Literary prize from Tórshavn Council)

== Legacy ==
Shortly after her death, Marianne Clausen's Faroese translator Martin Fjallstein initiated a memorial evening, which was held on 10 February 2015 in Føroyahúsið in Copenhagen, with the participation of her two choirs Con Brio and Húsakórið, as well as the Mpiri choir, which she helped to get started.

In February 2016 Tutl Records in Tórshavn released a DVD and cd (Tutl SHD161) entitled ”Faðir vár”, containing texts by Faroese poet Mikkjal á Ryggi sung by Niels Midjord and Eilin Hansen, using melodies from Marianne Clausen's books.

On July 27, 2016 Tutl Records released a cd (Tutl SHD163), where the women's choir Kata performs a selection of 12 arrangements by Unn Patursson and Greta Bech, of texts and melodies, mainly vísur and skjaldur, from Marianne Clausen's books.

In May 2018, Fróðskaparsetur Føroya (University of the Faroes), began uploading on their website many of the sound recordings, which had formed the basis of Marianne Clausen's work.
