= Húsakórið =

Faroese choir

Húsakórið is a Faroese choir situated in Copenhagen, Denmark. It is the oldest and largest Faroese choir outside the Faroe Islands, and has become an important social institution for Faroese living in the Copenhagen area. Its conductors have been Marianne Clausen (1978-2000), the famous Faroese composer Sunleif Rasmussen (2000-2001), and Tórður á Brúnni (2001–present). In 2004, the choir toured the Faroe Islands.

== Discography ==
- Sólarmessa, CD with 14 songs, Released in 2006 and again as Audio CD in 2011.
