= Hans Qvist =

Danish engraver

Hans Qvist (c. 1735 – 12 February 1810) was a Danish engraver.

== Early life and education ==
Qvist was probably born in Copenhagen. He apprenticed as an engraver under Jonas Haas and Odvardt Helmoldt von Lode. Haas sued him for having left his workshop to set up his own without the Royal Art Academy's approval but the dispute seems ultimately to have been settled outside the courtroom.

== Career ==
Qvist completed a substantial number of prospects for Johan Jacob Bruun's Novus Atlas Daniæ in 1761. These are believed to be his first independent works. He worked for the Royal Bank in around 1765–85. He created most of the engravings for Bruuns work as well as some of the leads for Danske Atlas. He created four of the prints for Erik Pontoppidan the Younger in 1764. He made a map of Copenhagen County for the Royal Academy of Science in 1766–69. He also created a few book illustrations, for instance in 1761 and 1771.

== Personal life ==
Qvist married Cathrine Elisabeth Liebenberg (1746 – 1828), in January 1765. He purchased the property at Ny Vestergade 9 in 1772 and sold it to royal gunsmith Christian Kyhl in 1797.
