= Jacob Stilling-Andersen =

Danish dairy manager (1858–1933)

Jacob Stilling-Andersen (24 June 1858 - 18 February 1933) was a Danish dairy manager and businessman. He played a central role in the foundation of a number of co-operative dairy companies in the 1870s and 1880s before founding The Danish Butter Export Union Ltd. in 1902. He served on the board of the Port of Copenhagen from 1913 and was its vice chairman from 1926.

== Early life and education ==
Stilling-Andersen was born on 24 June 1858 in Ølgod, the son of farmerJens Mathias Bollerup Andersen (1822–68) and Marie Cathrine Mouridsen (1827–79). He changed his last name from Andersen to StillingAndersen on 10 July 1912. He was brought up in a prominent Grundtvigian. He was initially trained as a farmer but was from 1877 also educated in the dairy industry. He attended Tune Landboskole in 1880–81.

== Career ==
Stilling-Andersen played a central role in the foundation Hjedding Co-Operative Dairy and was its first manager. In 1884, he also founded the first co-operative dairy in Sønderjylland. In 1885–89, he was manager of Nørre Nebel Co-Operative Dairy.

He was in 1889 engaged as a consultant in P. A. Alberti's Danske Landmænds Smøreksportforening. He left the enterprise in 1892 to set up his own butter export business, et A/S The Danish Butter Export Union Ltd., with himself both as managing director and chairman. Stilling-Andersen was a co-founder of the Danish Dairy Board (Dansk Mejeristforening) in 1887 and served on the board from 1887 to 1901. He served on the board of the Port of Copenhagen from 1913, from 1926 as chairman.

== Personal life ==
Stilling-Andersen married Mette Marie Christensen Tranberg (10 November 1860 - 17 May 1936), a daughter of farmer Christen Knudsen T. (1820–1903) and Kirsten Mikkelsen (1836–1916), on 11 November 1884 in Agersnap. He purchased Ny Vestergade 9 in Copenhagen in 1922. He died on 18 February 1933 and is buried at Vestre Cemetery in Copenhagen.

== Honours ==
Stilling-Andersen was created a Knight in the Order of the Dannebrog in 1904 and was awarded the Order of Merit in 1932.
