= Kingosgade =

Street in Copenhagen, Denmark

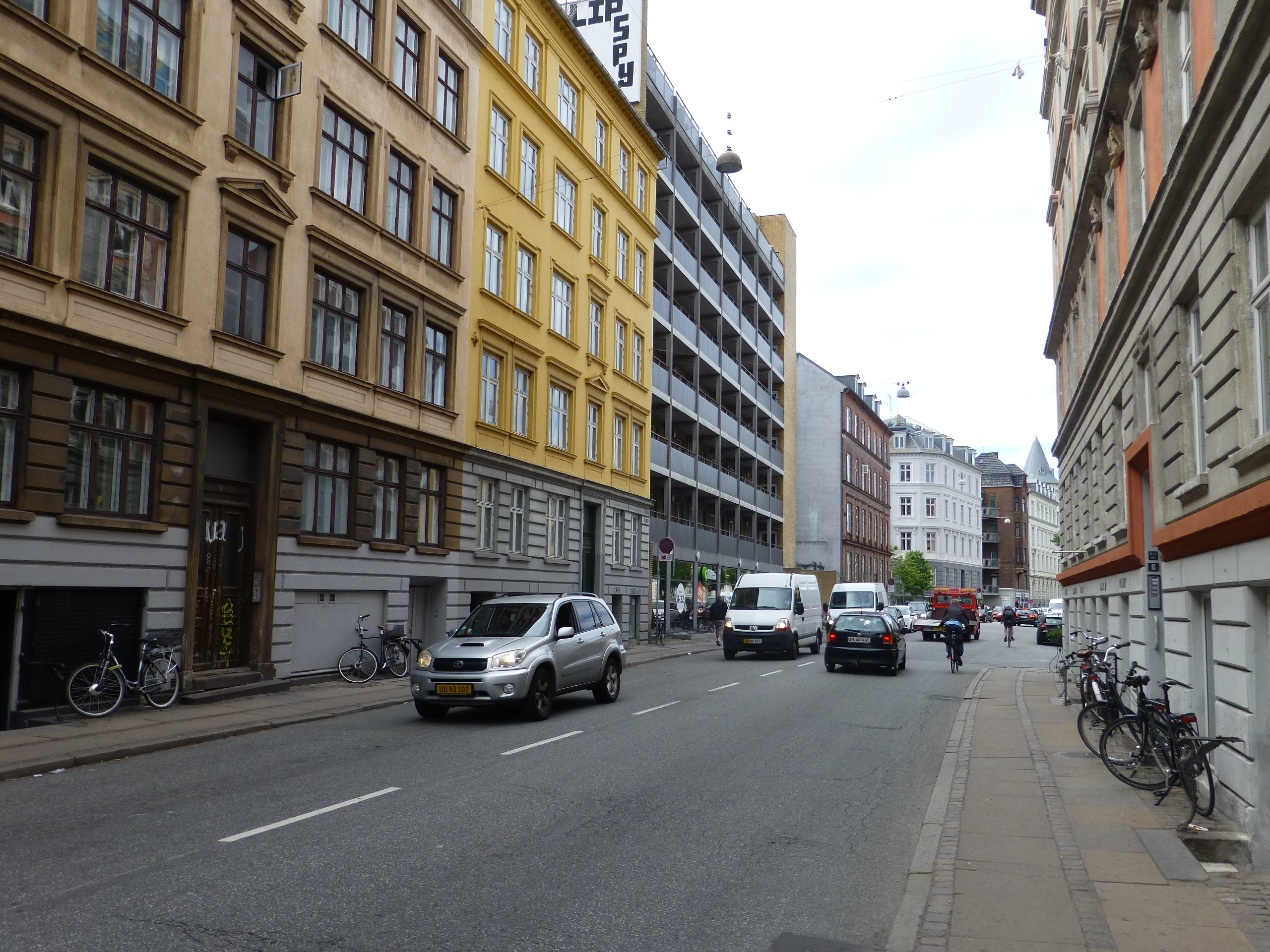
- Length: 230 m (750 ft)
- Location: Copenhagen, Denmark
- Quarter: Vesterbro/Kongens Enghave and Frederiksberg
- Nearest metro station: Frederiksberg Allé
- Coordinates: 55°40′21″N 12°32′41.43″E
- South end: Vesterbrogade
- North end: Frederiksberg Allé

Kingosgade is a street straddling the border between Vesterbro and Frederiksberg in Copenhagen, Denmark. It runs from Vesterbrogade in the south to Frederiksberg Allé in the north, linking Enghavevej with Alhambravej.

== History ==
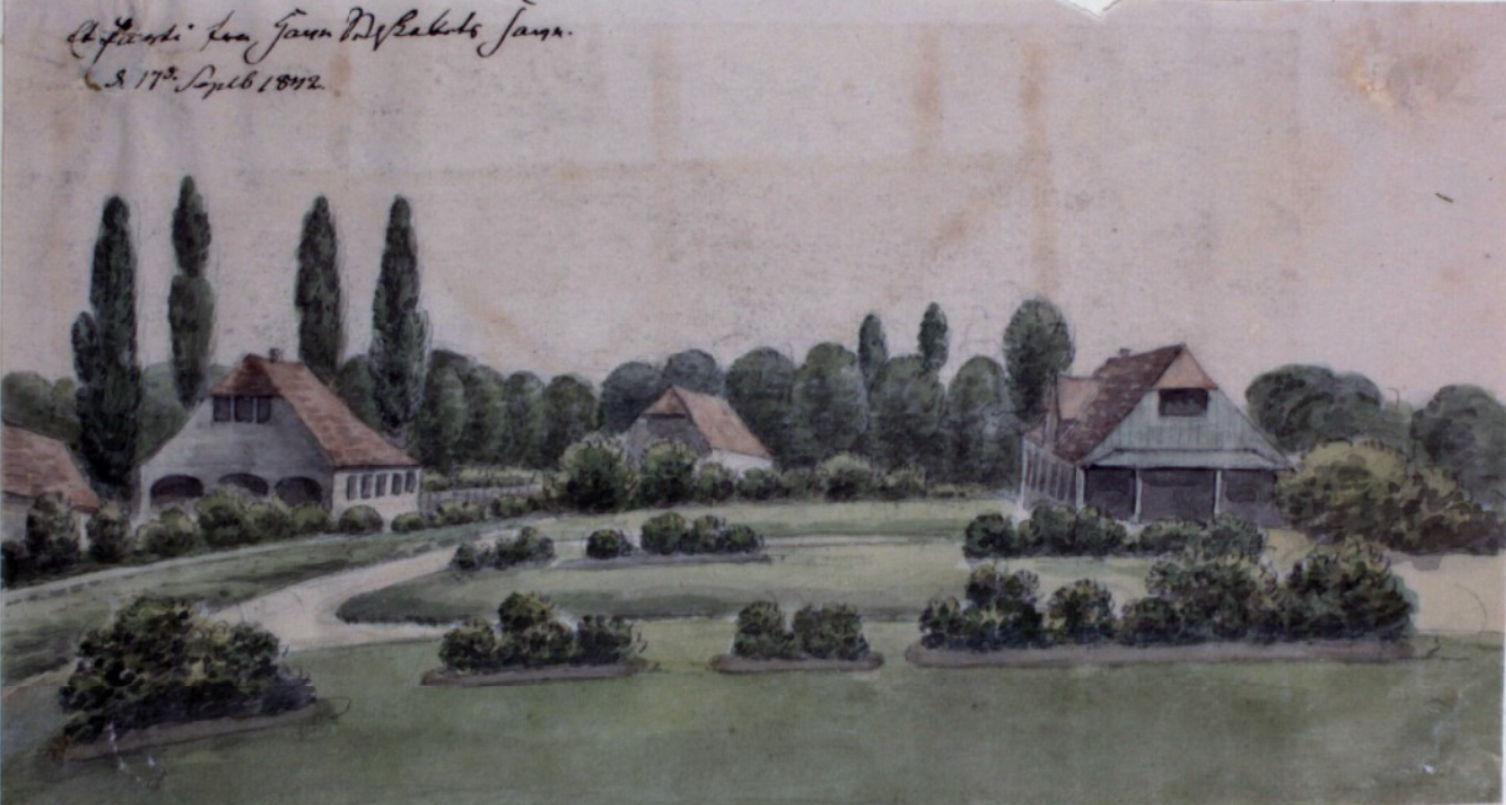
Ole Jørgen Rawert: The Royal Horticultural Society's Garden on 17 September 1842

A roadside inn named Gule Hest (Yellow Horse) was in the 18th century located at the site. It was one of four inns known as "Horses" located along the western access road to Copenhagen. The Yellow Horse had four pavilions and two bowling courses.

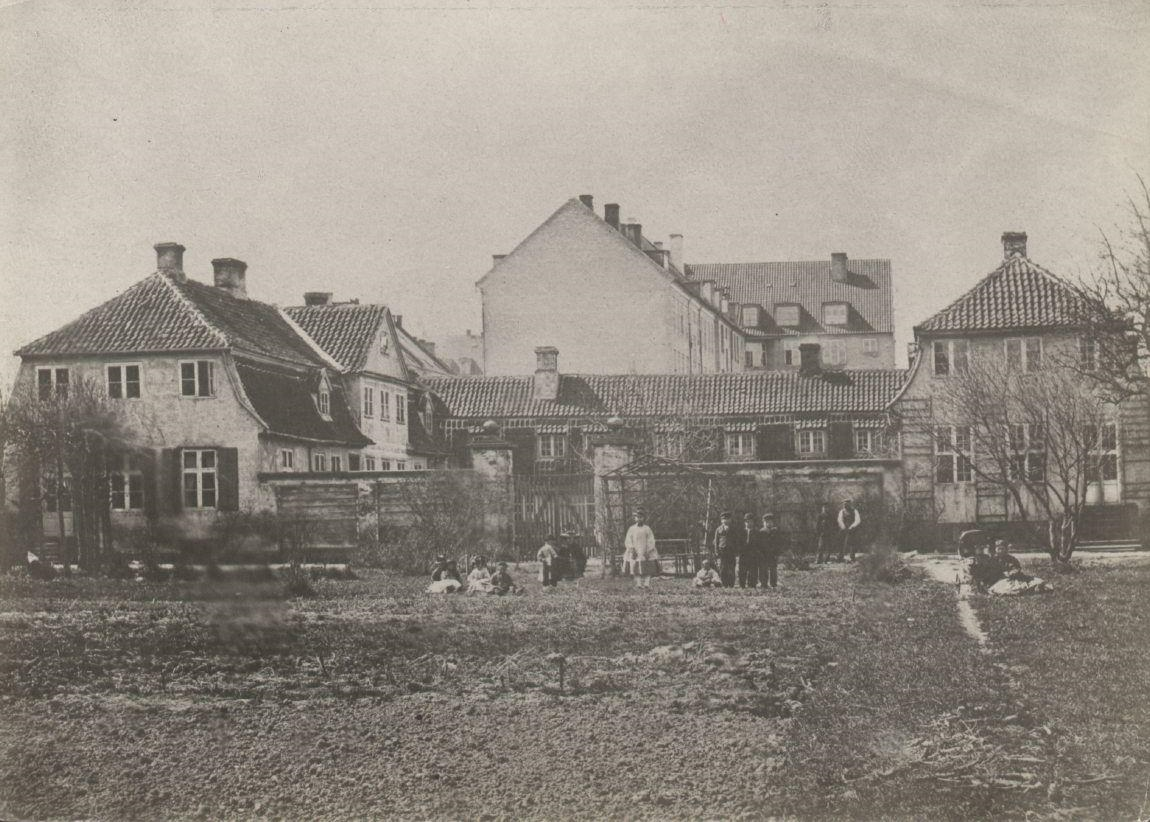
Haabet seen from the garden, 1864

Gule Hest was in 1778 purchased by Peter Borre, renamed Haabet (The Hope) and used as a tobacco factory. Part of the area between the Vestre Landevej and Frederiksberg Allé was laid out as tobacco fields and a horse-driven mill was constructed for the processing of tobacco into snus. Other exotic produce cultivated on the estate included peaches, apricots, mulberries and grapes.

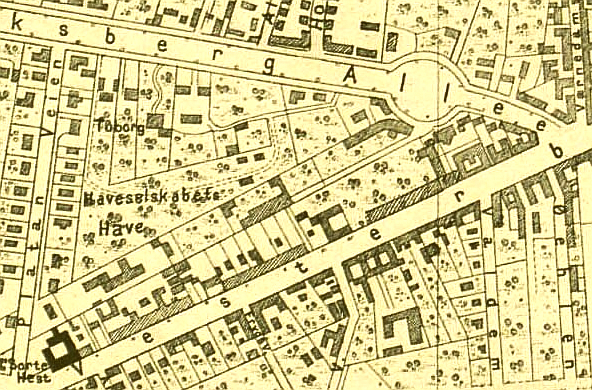
The site seen on a map detail from 1876

The Royal Danish Horticultural Society's first garden was in 1837 laid out on a piece of land to the north of Haabet.

Haabet (Vesterbrogade 108) was in the late 1840s purchased by textile manufacturer Ole Ferdinand Olsen. He sold off the land in lots. The three-winged main building was demolished in circa 1883.

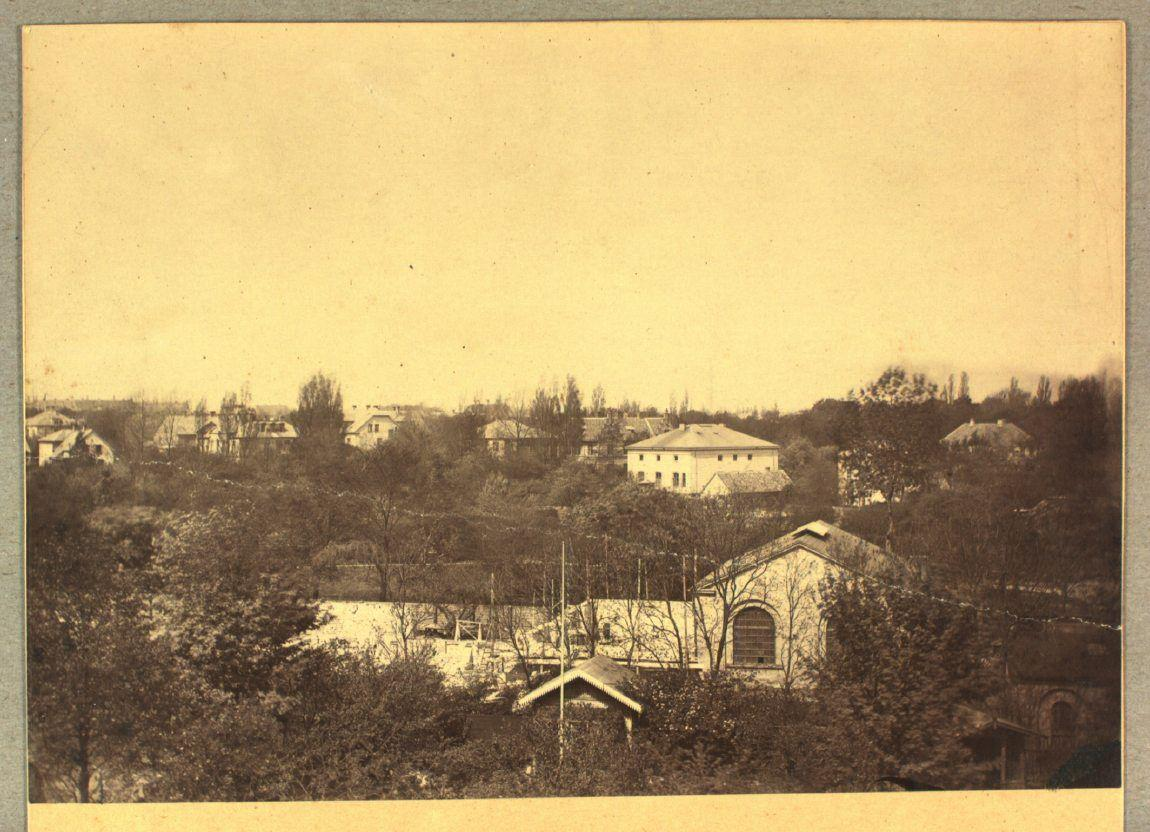
C. F. Riedel & Lindegaard

Three new streets in the area were given the names Kingosgade, Boyesgade and Brorsonsgade after the priest-and-hymn writers Thomas Kingo, Casper Johannes Boye (1791–1853) and Hans Adolph Brorson. The names were proposed by city engineer Thorvald Krak. The Royal Horticultural Society's Garden had relocated to its current location at Frederiksberg Runddel in 1883 and a fourth new street at the site was named Haveselskabetsvej (The Horticultural Society Road ) to commemorate its old location.

C. F. Riedel & Lindegaard, an iron foundry and machine factory, was from 1867 located at the future street (later No. 11). Its buildings were demolished in 1970.

Tram line 3 drove through the street.

== Buildings ==
The building at Kingosgade 2/Vesterbrogade 106B, is from 1884 to 1886 and was designed by Ferdinand Vilhelm Jensen.

The building at the eastern corner with Frederiksberg Allé (Frederiksberg Allé 23) is colloquially known as Little Rosenborg due to its Neo-Renaissance style with two small towers and rich decorations, although its resemblance to Christian IV's Rosenborg Castle can hardly be described as striking. It was designed by Johan Daniel Herholdt´in collaboration with Christian V. Nielsen and completed in 1857. The yellow, three-storey complex at No. 11 is from 1929.

== Transport ==
The northern end of the street is located approximately 250 metres to the east of Frederiksberg Allé metro station. The southern end of the street is located approximately 500 metres to the north of Enghave Plads metro station. Both stations are served by the Copenhagen Metro's City Circle Line.

DOT bus line 1A drives through the street. Line 7A had a stop at Kingosgade on Vesterbrogade.

== Cultural references ==
Kriminalgaaden i Kingosgadee (The Mystery in Kingosgade) is a 1917 silent film directed by Hjalmar Davidsen.

In episode 67 (Olsen, ham kan vi li) of the protagonists in the DR television series Huset på Christianshavn, Ellen Olsen (Helle Virkner) meets her childhood boyfriend, Oscar Anderse from Kingosgade, and develops a new interest in him.

== See also ==
- Tårnborgvej
