= Thomas Kingo =

Danish bishop, poet, hymn-writer (1634–1703)

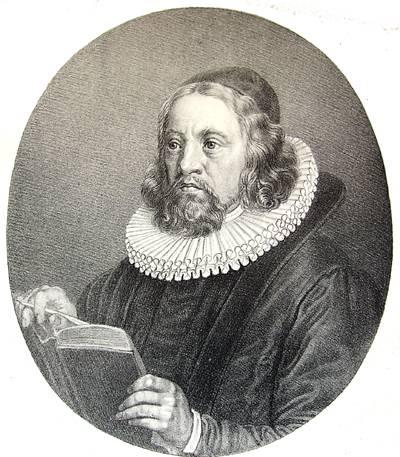
- Church: Church of Denmark
- Diocese: Diocese of Funen
- In office: 1677–1703
- Predecessor: Niels Hansen Bang
- Successor: Christian Rudolph Müller

Personal details
- Born: 15 December 1634 Slangerup, Denmark
- Died: 14 October 1703 (aged 68) Odense, Denmark
- Education: University of Copenhagen

Thomas Hansen Kingo (15 December 1634 – 14 October 1703) was a Danish bishop, poet and hymnwriter born in Slangerup, near Copenhagen. His work marked the high point of Danish baroque poetry.

== Early life and education ==
His parents were Hans Thomsen Kingo and Karen Sørensdatter. His father was born in Crail, Scotland, and moved to Helsingør, Denmark, as a two-year old; he became a weaver of modest means. The name Kingo is a shortening of the Scottish name Kinghorn. Although his parents were not wealthy, he was sent to Frederiksborg Latin School at the age of 16 in 1650. He studied theology at the University of Copenhagen, enrolling in 1654 and graduating in 1658.

== Career ==
Kingo started his career by working as a private tutor at Frederiksborg Castle. From 1659 he lived on the Vedbygård estate at Tissø, where he wrote some of his first poems. In 1661 he was appointed chaplain to the priest Peder Worm at Kirke Helsinge and Drøsselbjerg, and in 1668 he was ordained a minister in his hometown of Slangerup, where his poem-writing began. In 1677 Kingo was appointed bishop of the Diocese of Funen.

== Poems and hymns ==
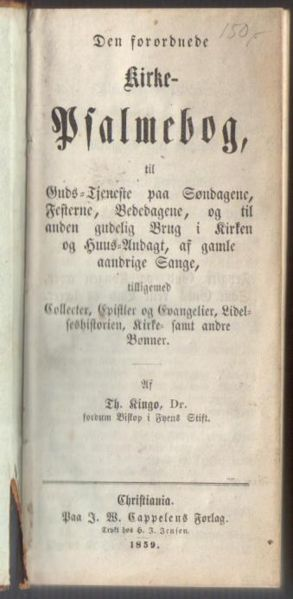
Kingo's hymnal, 1859 edition

At first he essayed patriotic poems, but later devoted himself almost entirely to writing hymns, and in 1674 the first part of his Aandelige Siunge-Koor ("Spiritual Song Choir") appeared, followed in 1681 by a second part. This work consists of a collection of hymns, several of which are still popular in the Church of Denmark.

Charged by the government with the compilation of a new hymnbook, he edited what became known as Kingo's hymnal (Kingos Psalmebog, 1699), which contains eighty-five of his own compositions, and which is still used in various parts of Denmark and Norway. Some parts of the Danish rural population firmly held to his hymns during the Pietist and Rationalist period, contributing to their survival. The same goes for the Faroe Islands, where his hymns have been in widespread use through most of the 20th century, often sung to quite complicated folk melodies, which may, however, often be traced back to Kingo’s melody collection, or Gradual, from 1699, as described by Marianne Clausen in her magnum opus about Faroese folk singing. The original copies of his hymnals are located at the National Library of the Faroe Islands.

Though not the first Danish hymnwriter, Kingo is considered the first of importance; among 17th-century Danish poets he is generally a leading figure. His hymns are born by a forceful and often Old Testamental wrath and renunciation of the world alternating with Christian meekness and confidence. Both elements are thrown in relief by his private thrift and fighting nature. His worldly poems and patriotic songs are often long-winded and marked by outer effects but in short version he is unequalled, as in his both plain and worthy ode to naval hero Niels Juel.

== Personal life ==
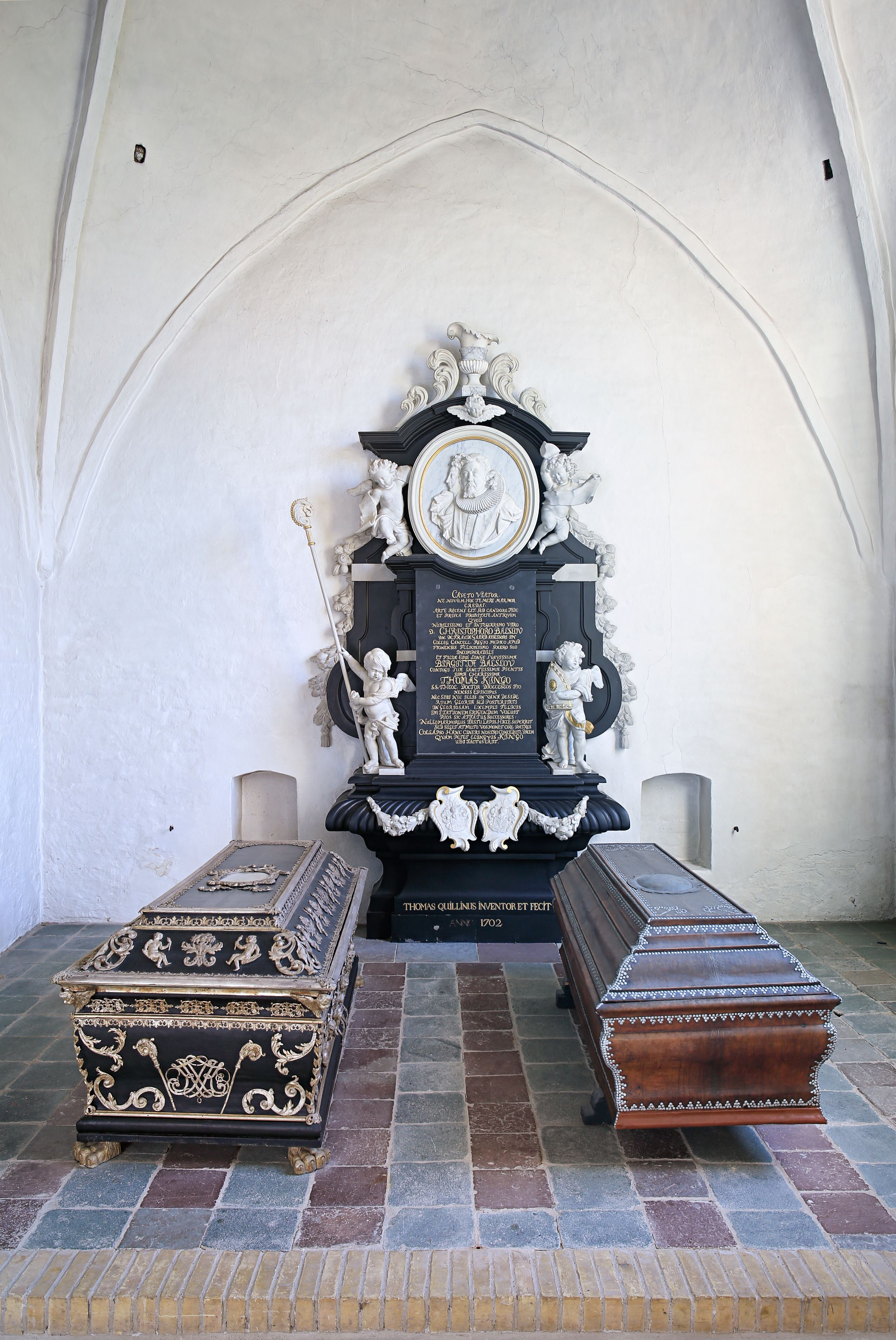
Thomas Quellinus' epitaph to Christoffer Balslev, Thomas Kingo and BIrgitte Balslev, 1702, as well as Thomas Kingo's and Birgitte Balslev's sarcophaguses.

Kingo's first wife, Sille Blackenborg, to whom he had dedicated the poem "Chrysillis, mit Hjeertes Guld", died the year after their wedding in 1670; she was the widow of the priest of Kirke-Helsinge. His second wife, Johanne Lauritsdatter Lund, was 13 years older than him. His last wife, Birgitte Balslev, was 30 years old when the 60-year-old Kingo married her in 1694.

In 1679 he was admitted to the nobility and in 1682 he received his doctorate in theology. He was appointed justitsråd ('councilor of justice') in 1690.

He was plagued with a skin condition in his later years and died in Odense in 1703. He is buried in Fraugde Kirke outside of Odense. Thomas Quellinus designed an epitaph as well as an elaborate metal screen for Kingo's burial chapel in the chapel in the church. The screen was made by either Hans Hansen or Hans Hermansen, two Odense-based smiths who have signed their works HH. The screen was later transferred to Frederik Christian Kaas' burial chapel in the church.

An 1874 bust of Kingo by Theobald Stein stands on the north side of St. Knud's Cathedral in Odense. A 1911 statue of Kingo created by Viggo Jarl stands outside Frederick's Church in Copenhagen. Thomas Kingo's Church in Odense and the street Kingosgade in Copenhagen are also named in his honour.

== Gallery ==
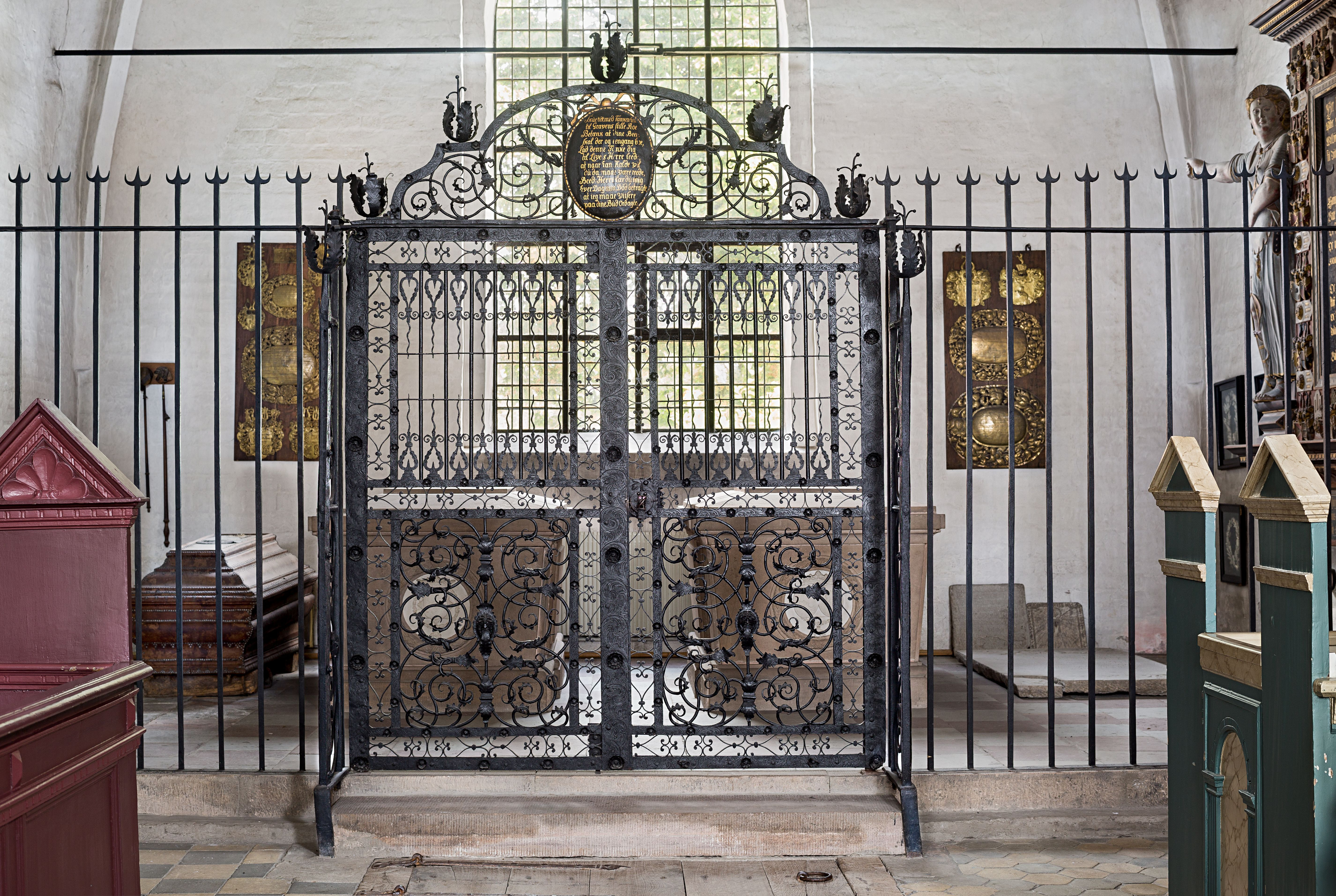
The metal screen from Kingo's burial chapel

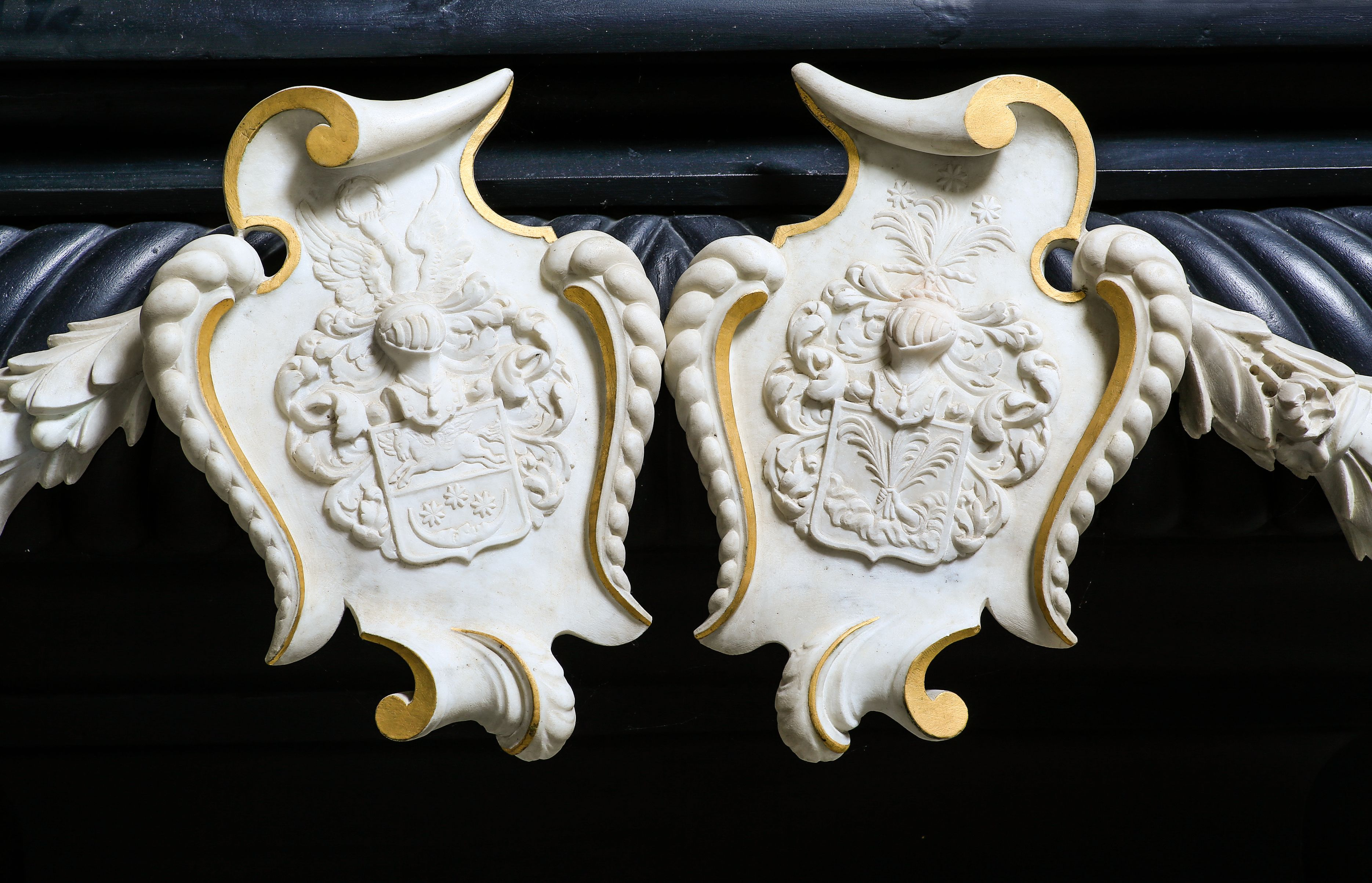
Kingo's and his wife's coats of arms from the screen.

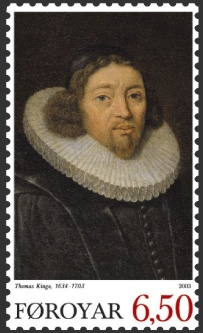
Faroese stamp with Kingo's portrait.

== Selected works ==
=== Hymns ===
The website salmer.dk lists the following hymns by Kingo:

- "Sorrig og glæde de vandre til hobe" (1681, 7 stanzas, 2 melodies)
- "Far verden far vel" (1681, 1899, 9 stanzas, 2 melodies)
- "Nu kom der bud fra englekor" (1689, 1852; 6 stanzas, 1 melody)
- "Nu rinder solen op" (1674, 8 stanzas, 2 melodies)
- "Kom, sandheds Ånd, og vidne giv" (1699 1864, 4 stanzas, 1 melody)
- "Den klare sol går ned, det kvælder mer og mer" (1674, 7 stanzas, 1 melody)
- "Som den gyldne sol frembryder" (1689, 9 stanzas, 1 melody)
- "Se hvor nu Jesus træder" (1689, 1845; 10 stanzas, 2 melodies)
- "Tak for al din fødsels glæde" (1689, 1845; 1 stanza, 1 melody)
- "Lad tidens hjul omdrive" (1689, 1857; 2 stanzas, 1 melody)
- "Skriv dig, Jesus, på mit hjerte" (1689/1844, 1 stanza, 1 melody)
- "Op, glædes alle, glædes nu" (1689, 3 stanzas, 2 melodies)
- "Rind nu op i Jesu navn" (1674, 7 stanzas, 1 melody)
- "Rettens spir det alt er brækket" (1689, 5 stanzas, 1 melody)
- "Gak under Jesu kors at stå" (1689. 1832-45 1951; 16 stanzas, 1 melody)
- "Vågn op og slå på dine strenge" (1674, 5 stanzas, 1 melody)
- "Fra verdens morgenstund udgår" (1689, 1854, 1951; 5 stanzas, 1 melody)
- "Nu nærmer sig vor pinsefest" (1699, 11 stanzas, 2 melodies)
- "Søde Jesus, Davids rod" (1689, 1868; 1 stanza, 1 melody)
- "Hvor stor er dog den glæde" (1689, 6 stanzas, 2 melodies)
- "Far verden far vel" (original, 1681, 15 stanzas, 2 melodies)
- "Hører til I høje Himle" (1689; 8 stanzas, 1 melody)
- "O salig påskedag" (1689, 2 stanzas, 1 melody)
- "Nat, søvn og slum og seng, farvel" (1677, 7 stanzas, 2 melodies)
- "O Herre Gud din lære" (1689 1854, 4 stanzas, 2 melodies)
- "Op min sjæl thi sol er oppe" (1684, 4 stanzas, 1 melody)
- "Morgenrøden sig udstrækker" (1684, 6 stanzas, 1 melody)
- "Dig vandre vi så gerne med" (1689, 1853; 5 stanzas, 1 melody)
- "O Jesus, søde Jesus, dig" (1689, 3 stanzas, 2 melodies)
- "Mørket skjuler jorderige" (1689, 7 stanzas, 1 melody)
- "Op, Zion, at oplukke" (1689, 1857; 2 stanzas, 1 melody)
- "Min sol, min lyst, min glæde" (1689, 5 stanzas, 2 melodies)
- "O gode Gud, din kærlighed" (1699, 1853; 7 stanzas, 1 melody)
- "Det runde himlens stjernetelt" (1689, 1853; 6 stanzas, 1 melody)
- "Over Kedron Jesus træder" (1689, 8 stanzas, 1 melody)
- "O Jesus, gør det ved din Ånd" (1689, 1852; 6 stanzas, 1 melody)
- "O store Gud, din kærlighed" (1699, 7 stanzas, 1 melody)
- "Herre Jesus, kom at røre" (1699, 1850; 3 stanzas, 1 melody)
- "Hvor dejlig skal Guds kirke stå" (1699, 8 stanzas, 1 melody)
- "Længe haver Satan spundet" (1689, 1699; 7 stanzas, 1 melody)
- "Ingen højhed, ingen ære" (1689, 9 stanzas, 1 melody)
- "Sover I Hvor kan I sove" (1689, 7 stanzas, 1 melody)
- "Mig lyster nu at træde" (1689, 1844; 5 stanzas, 1 melody)
- "Farvel du hvilesøde nat" (1684, 5 stanzas, 2 melodies)
- "Fryd dig i Guds behag" (1589, 7 stanzas, 1 melody)
- "Hvor saligt var det ægtepar" (1689, 1854, 1890; 7 stanzas, 2 melodies)
- "Alle ting er underfulde" (1689, 5 stanzas, 2 melodies)
- "Store Gud og Frelsermand" (1689, 4 stanzas, 1 melody)
- "Søde Jesus, jule-fyrste" (1689, 1832; 6 stanzas, 2 melodies)
- "O Jesus, på din alterfod" (1681, 1852; 10 stanzas, 1 melody)
- "Enhver, som tror og bliver døbt" (1689, 1843; 3 stanzas, 1 melody)
- "Hvor lifligt er det dog at gå" (1689, 9 stanzas, 1 melody)
- "Hvad er det for en snekke" (1689, 1857; 5 stanzas, 2 melodies)
- "Luk øjne op, o kristenhed" (1689, 3 stanzas, 1 melody)
- "Så skal dog Satans rige" (1689, 7 stanzas, 3 melodies)
- "O Jesus, præst i evighed" (1689, 1850; 7 stanzas, 1 melody)
- "O søde Gud, din kærlighed" (1699, 1837, 1853; 7 stanzas, 1 melody)
- "O kæreste sjæl, op at våge" (1689, 6 stanzas, 1 melody)
- "Fra Himmelen hid til os ned" (1699, 5 stanzas, 1 melody)
- "Hvor kan jeg noksom skønne på" (1699, 1854, 7 stanzas, 1 melody)
- "Nu ved jeg vej til Himmerig" (1699, 6 stanzas, 1 melody)
- "Vær trøstig, Zion, Jesu brud" (1689, 6 stanzas, 1 melody)
- "Op, sjæl, bryd søvnen af" (1689, 7 stanzas, 1 melody)
- "O Gud, du ved og kender" (1681, 1935; 4 stanzas, 1 melody)
- "Aldrig er jeg uden våde" (1681, 1850; 6 stanzas, 2 melodies)
- "Tiden skrider, dagen rinder" (1684, 6 stanzas, 1 melody)
- "O Jesus, går du da din vej" (1699, 8 stanzas, 1 melody)
- "Lov og tak og evig ære ske dig" (1689, 3 stanzas, 1 melody)
- "Nu bør ej synden mere" (1699, 1890; 4 stanzas, 3 melodies)
- "Gud er Gud, før jorden skabtes" (1674, 1947; 2 stanzas, 1 melody)
- "Sorrig og elendighed" (1681, 27 stanzas, 1 melody)
- "O Jesus, du al nådens væld" (1699, 1951; 4 stanzas, 1 melody)
- "Min sjæl, om du vil nogen tid" (1699, 9 stanzas, 1 melody)
- "Vor Gud er idel kærlighed" (1699, 4 stanzas, 2 melodies)
- "Den nåde, som vor Gud har gjort" (1699, 4 stanzas, 1 melody)
- "Gud lade rolighed og fred" (1689, 1947; 3 stanzas, 3 melodies)
- "Dagen nu sin afsked tager" (1677, 4 stanzas, 1 melody)
- "Hvilestunden er i vente" (1684, 9 stanzas, 1 melody)
- "Til hvile solen går" (1674, 8 stanzas, 2 melodies)
- "Aftenstjernen hisset tindrer" (1684, 4 stanzas, 1 melody)
- "Det mulmer mod den mørke nat" (1674, 5 stanzas, 1 melody)
- "Se, hvor sig dagen atter skynder" (1674, 7 stanzas, 2 melodies)

Children's hymns

- "Sorrig og glæde" (1681, 1 stanza, 1 melody)
- "Nu rinder solen op" (1674, 1 stanza, 1 melody)

=== Poems ===
- "Chrysillis"
