= August Duvier =

Danish stained glass artist and manufacturer

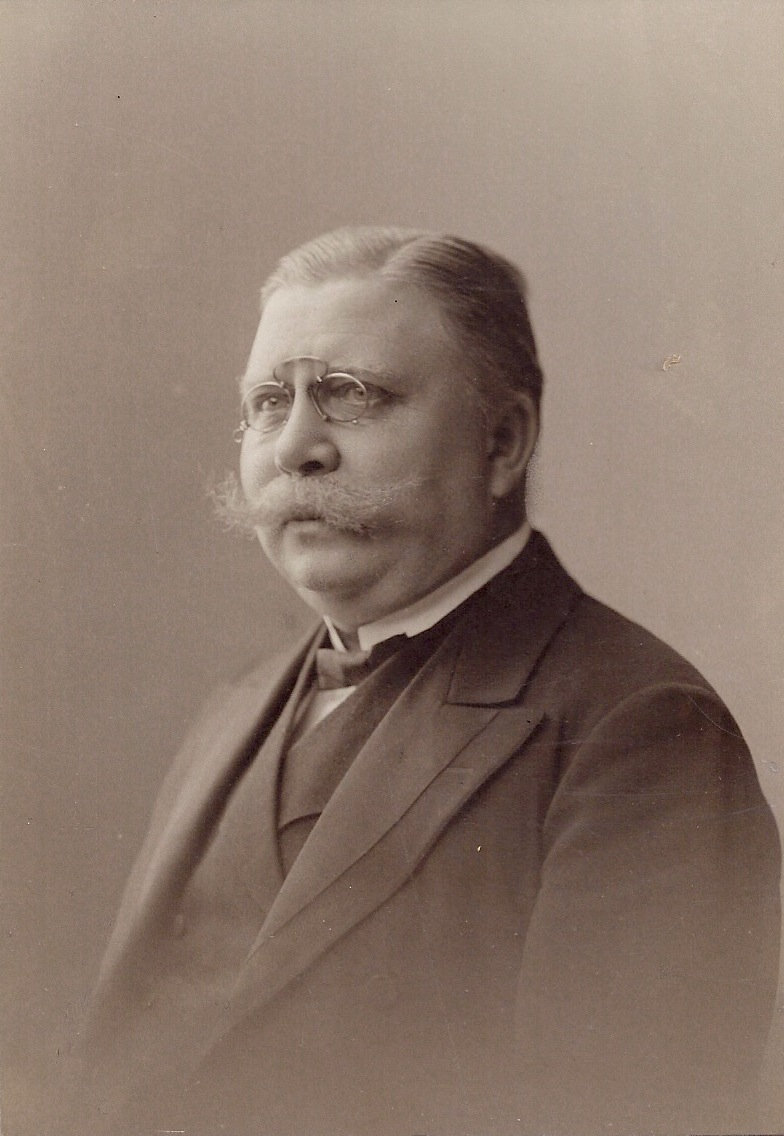
Thorvald Peter August Duvier

August Duvier (16 March 1860 – 14 January 1928) was a Danish stained glass artist and manufacturer active in Denmark in the late 19th century and early 20th century. He introduced and popularized stained glass in Denmark collaborating with artists such as Joakim Skovgaard and Thorvald Bindesbøll. He was one of the most prominent members of his profession in both his native country and the rest of Europe and might be considered a Danish equivalent to Louis Comfort Tiffany.
