= Tårnborgvej =

Street in Copenhagen, Denmark

Tårnborgvej is a dead end street extending from the northside of Gammel Kongevej, one block East of H. C. Ørsteds Vej, in the Frederiksberg district of Copenhagen, Denmark.

== History ==
The street takes its name after Villa Tårnborg, a house located at the corner of Gammel Kongevej and H. C. Ørstedsvej, which was designed by Johan Daniel Herholdt for his sister and brother-in-law A. C.B. Bibow in 1856–47. The house was demolished in 1859.

== Buildings ==
A number of old villas from the late 19th century have survived. No. 12 is from 1867- The two houses at No. 4 (1893) and No. 6-8 were both designed by Vilhelm Friedrichsen. No. 6 (1870) is now home to Kaptajn Johnsens Skole's after school programmes.

Frederiksberg Borgerforenings Stiftelse (No. 14-16), a five-storey red brick building læcated behind a low fence at the end of the street, was built by Frederiksberg Borgerforening in 1902 as a retirement home for members of the association. It contained 20 dwellings. The architect was Ludvig Andersen who has also designed Pilegaarden and Skt. Joseph Hospital in Copenhagen. Frederiksberg Borgerforening had been founded back in 1888.

== Notable people ==
- Caspar Paludan Møller (1805–1882), historian, lived at No. 10 1874–82.
- Israel Levin (1810–1883), philologist and former secretary of Søren Kierkegaard, lived at No. 7 in 1878 – 1879.
