= C. F. Riedel & Lindegaard =

Danish iron foundry and machine factory

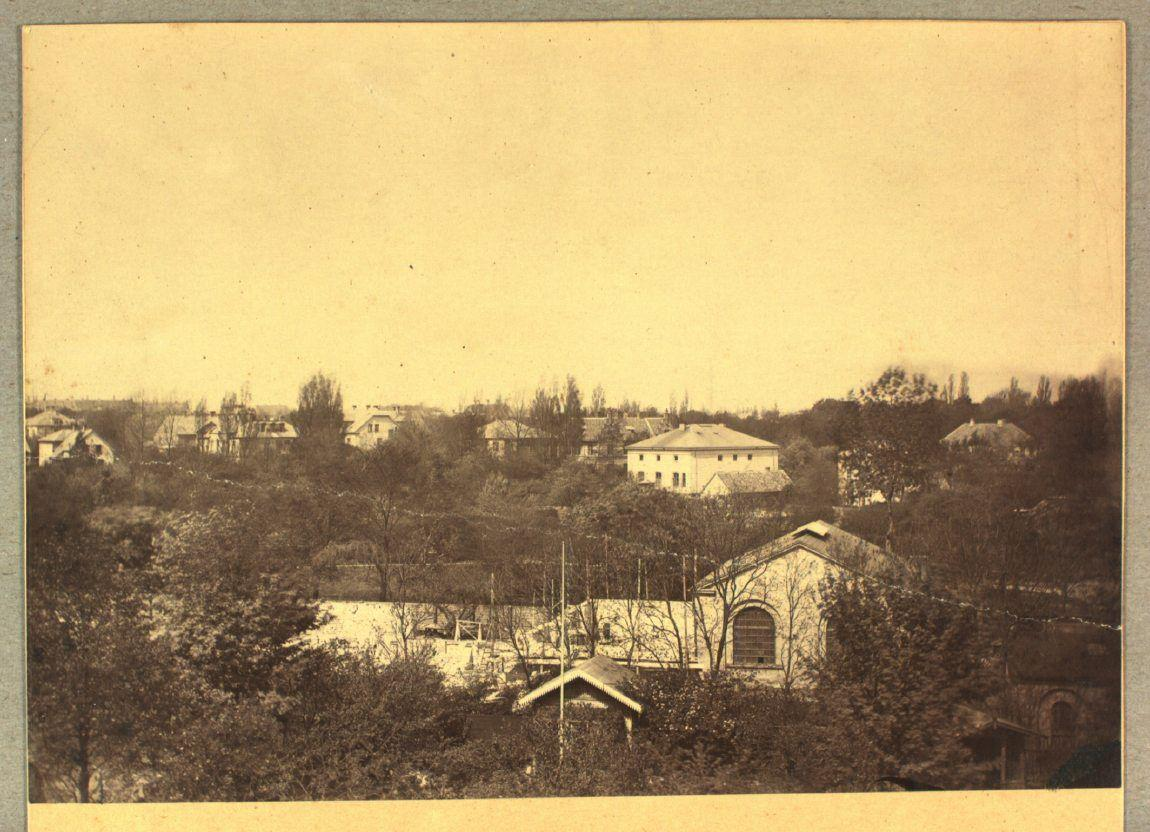
C. F. Riedel & Lindegaard's factory complex at Vesterbrogade in circa 1870

C. F. Riedel & Lindegaard was a Danish iron foundry and machine factory located at Kingosgade 11 in Copenhagen, Denmark.

== History ==
The company was founded on 16 March 1867 by C. F. Riedel (1823–1891) and Peter Lindegaard (1839–1910). It was jointly operated by the two founders until C. F. Riedel left it in 1887. P. Lindegaard then continued the company alone until he was joined by L. P. Larsen (1838–1905) and H. P. C. Haxthausen (1850–1922) as partners in 1889. L. P. Larsen's death and Lindegaard's retirement in 1905 left Haxthausen as the sole owner of the company. In 1908, he made C. Johansen (1863–1926) and H. V. Schwartz (1865–1949) partners. H. Haxthausen left the company in 1918 and C. Johansen left it in 1924. H. V. Schwartz then continued it alone until his son Ebbe Schwartz (born 1901) became a partner in 1931. Egon von der Lieth (born 1904) became a partner in 1942. H. V. Schwartz died in November 1949.

=== World War II sabotage ===
During the occupation of Denmark, early in the morning on 3 February 1945, C. F. Riedel & Lindegaard's Machine Factory was subject to sabotage by members of the Danish Resistance Movement. The aim of the operation was to stop the company's deliveries of railway tracks to the Danish State Railways.

== Products ==
The product range comprised cranes, lighthouse lanterns, Sewage pumping stations, boilers and railway tracks.
