= Velbastaður =

- Village
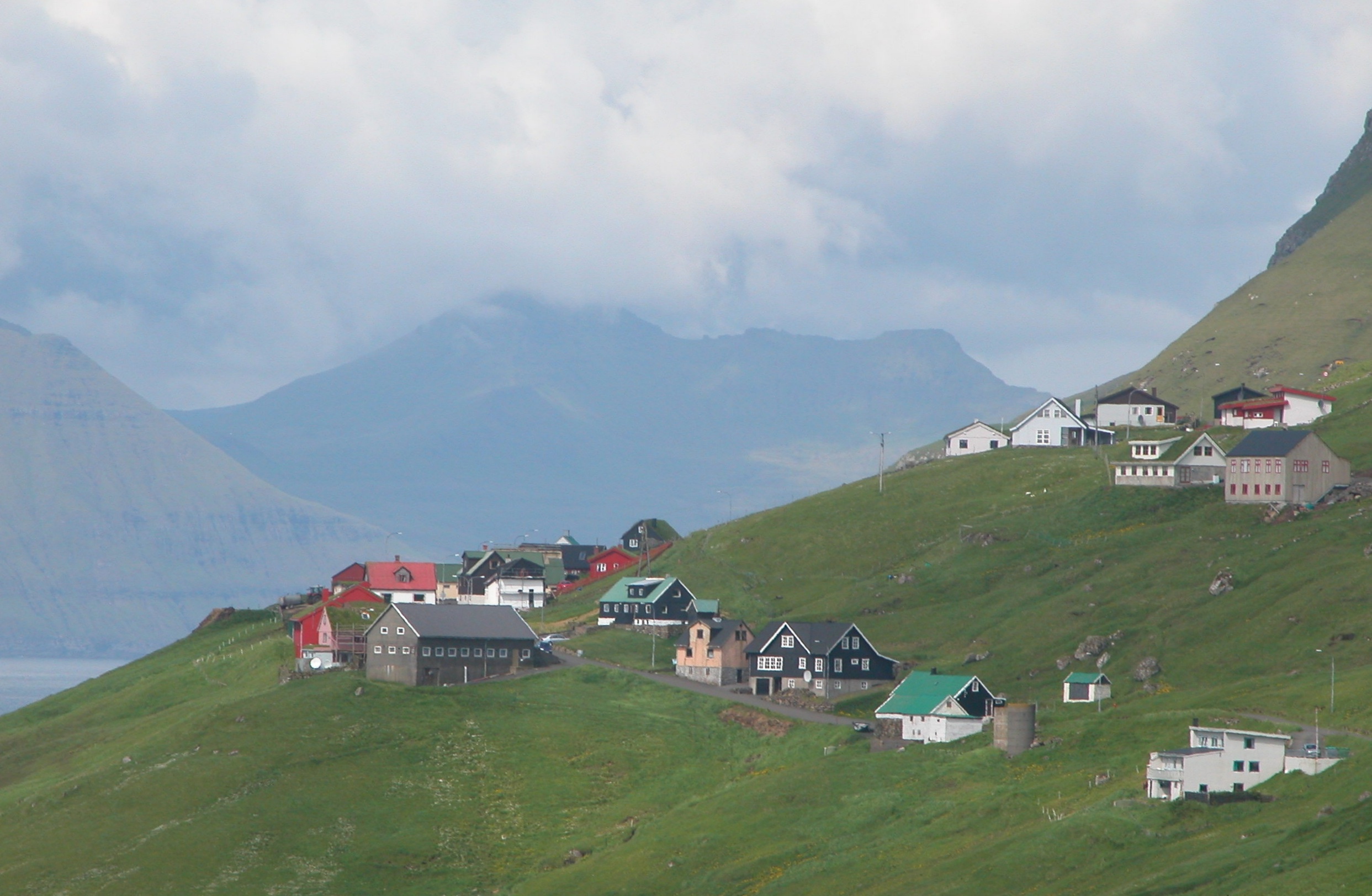

- Location in the Faroe Islands
- Coordinates: 61°59′5″N 6°51′2″W
- State: Kingdom of Denmark
- Constituent country: Faroe Islands
- Island: Streymoy
- Municipality: Tórshavn Municipality

Population (September 2025)
  - Total: 269
- Time zone: GMT
  - Summer (DST): UTC+1 (EST)
- Postal code: FO 176
- Climate: Cfc

Velbastaður (Danish: Velbestad) is a village on the island of Streymoy in the Faroe Islands. It is a part of Tórshavn Municipality and is considered among the oldest settlements in the islands. There are two schools and one kindergarten in the village, with children coming from the neighboring village of Kirkjubø as well as the capital at Tórshavn.

== Geography ==
Velbastaður is on Streymoy’s west coast in the south of the island, north of the ferry port of Gamlarætt and about five kilometres from Kirkjubøur. It has a beautiful view across the strait of Hestsfjørður towards the islands of Hestur and Koltur. The islands of Vágar and Mykines can be seen further to the west, and Sandoy further to the south.

== History ==
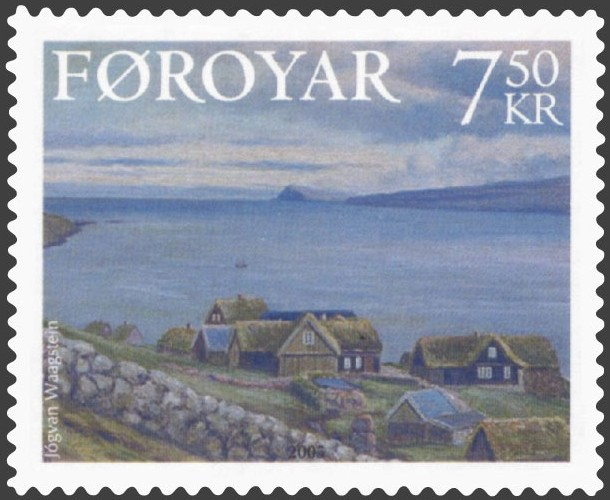
Faroe stamp featuring Velbastaður

Archaeological finds have unearthed artifacts possibly dating as far back as the Viking age, but most locations used in those times have washed into the sea now. Velbastaður is located nearly in the center of the archipelago, and close to the old Thing in Tórshavn across the mountain. This would support the idea that there was a shrine at Velbastaður. Tórshavn means the harbor of Thor. It was a natural harbor, and would be a good place for travelers to land their ships and boats and complete their journey overland, if conditions on the southwestern coast were disagreeable.

The location of Kirkjubø, only 5 km to the south east on the same coast, supports the notion that there was a heathen shrine at Velbastað. The early Christian church would often locate their headquarters as close as possible to sacred heathen locations, making it easier to subdue and convert the most fervent supporters of the old faiths.

The village was deserted for some time after the Black Death in 1349. The population of the village has increased in recent years from 134 in 1990, to 220 in 2015, mainly due to its close proximity to the capital Tórshavn, while still preserving the feeling of living in the countryside. A new residential and industrial area is being built on the rocks being excavated from the Sandoy tunnel.

=== Name origin ===
The place name Velbastaður is unique in the Faroes as it is the only settlement with the ending staður, meaning place or location. The name is considered by many the same as the Old Norse Vébólstaðr, meaning "farm with a Vé or shrine". Vé (from the Old Norse) was a type of sacred enclosure or a sanctuary. Locations with similar prefixes of Ve and histories of sacred locations, can be found several places in Norway, such as Vebbestad in Kvæstad, Troms and Veibust, in Sula, Møre og Romsdal.

== Gallery ==
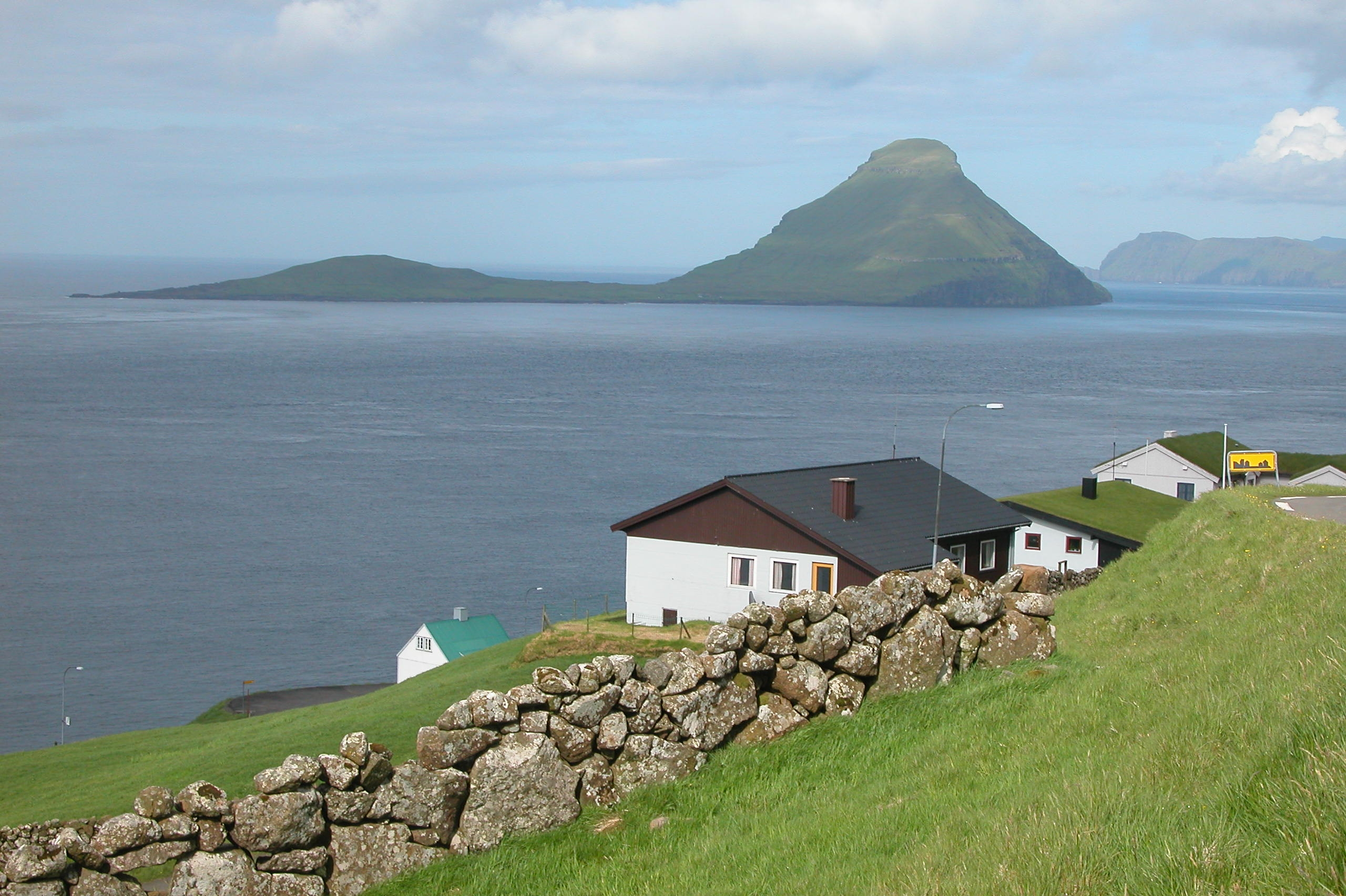

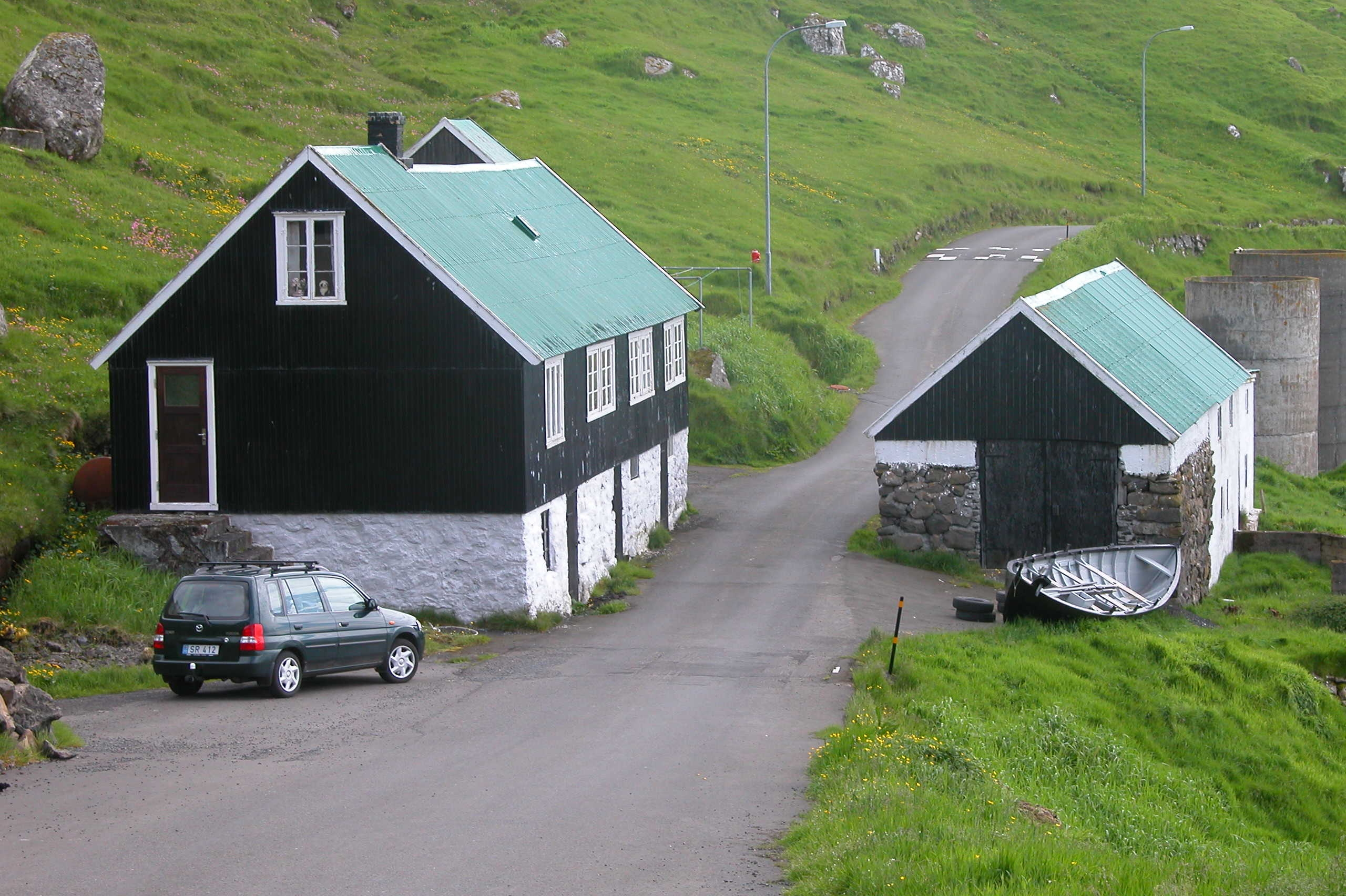

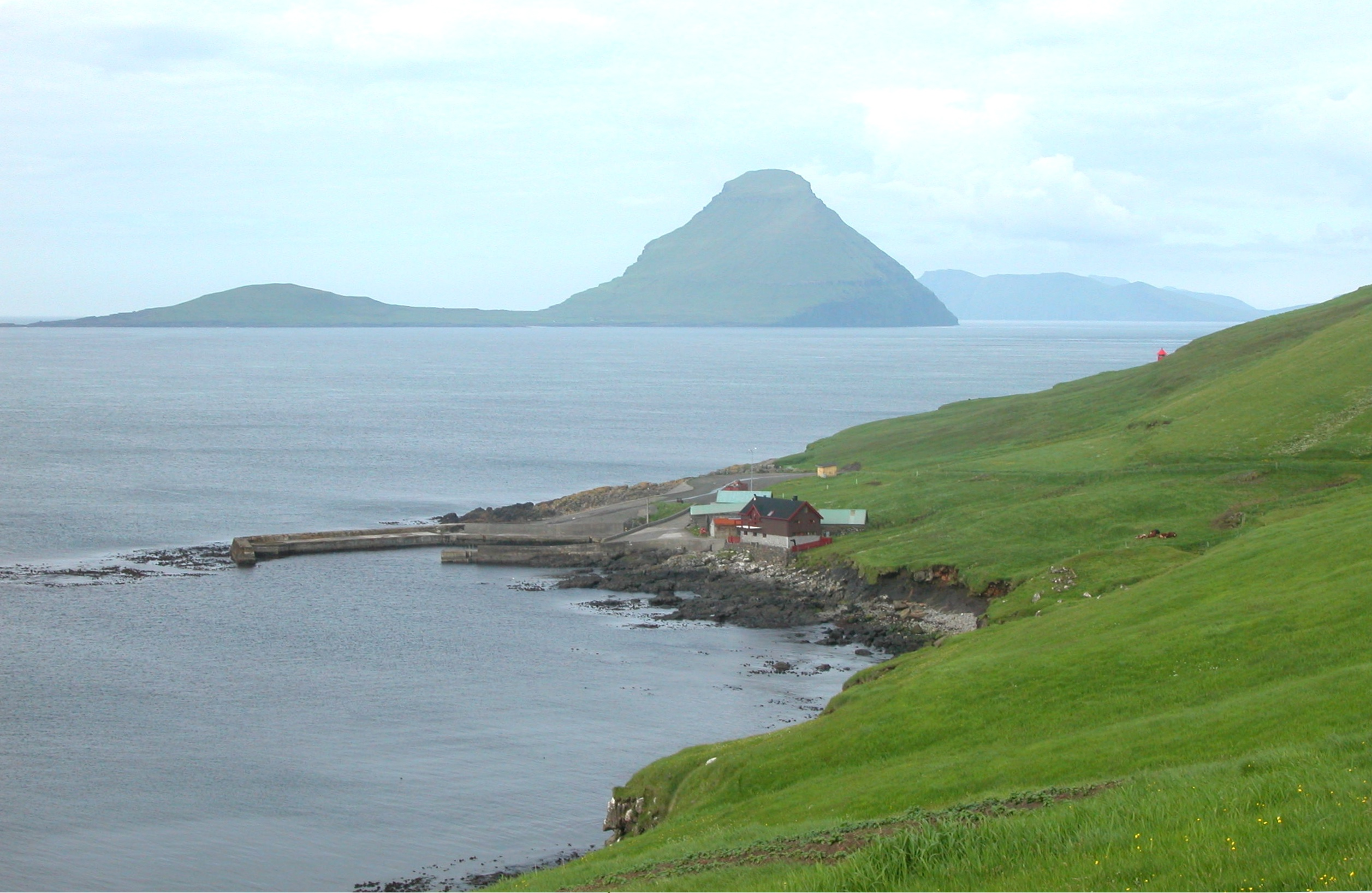

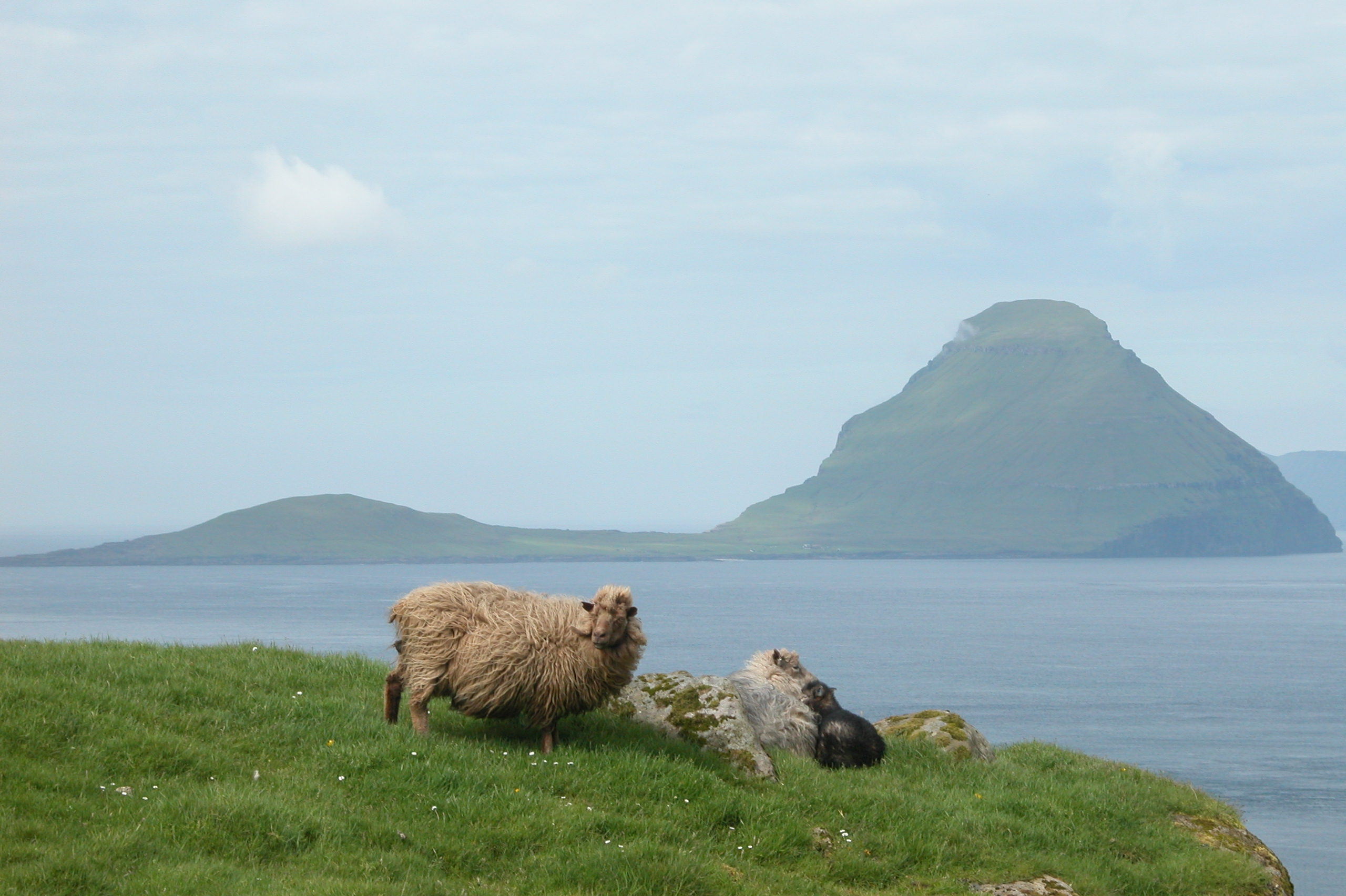

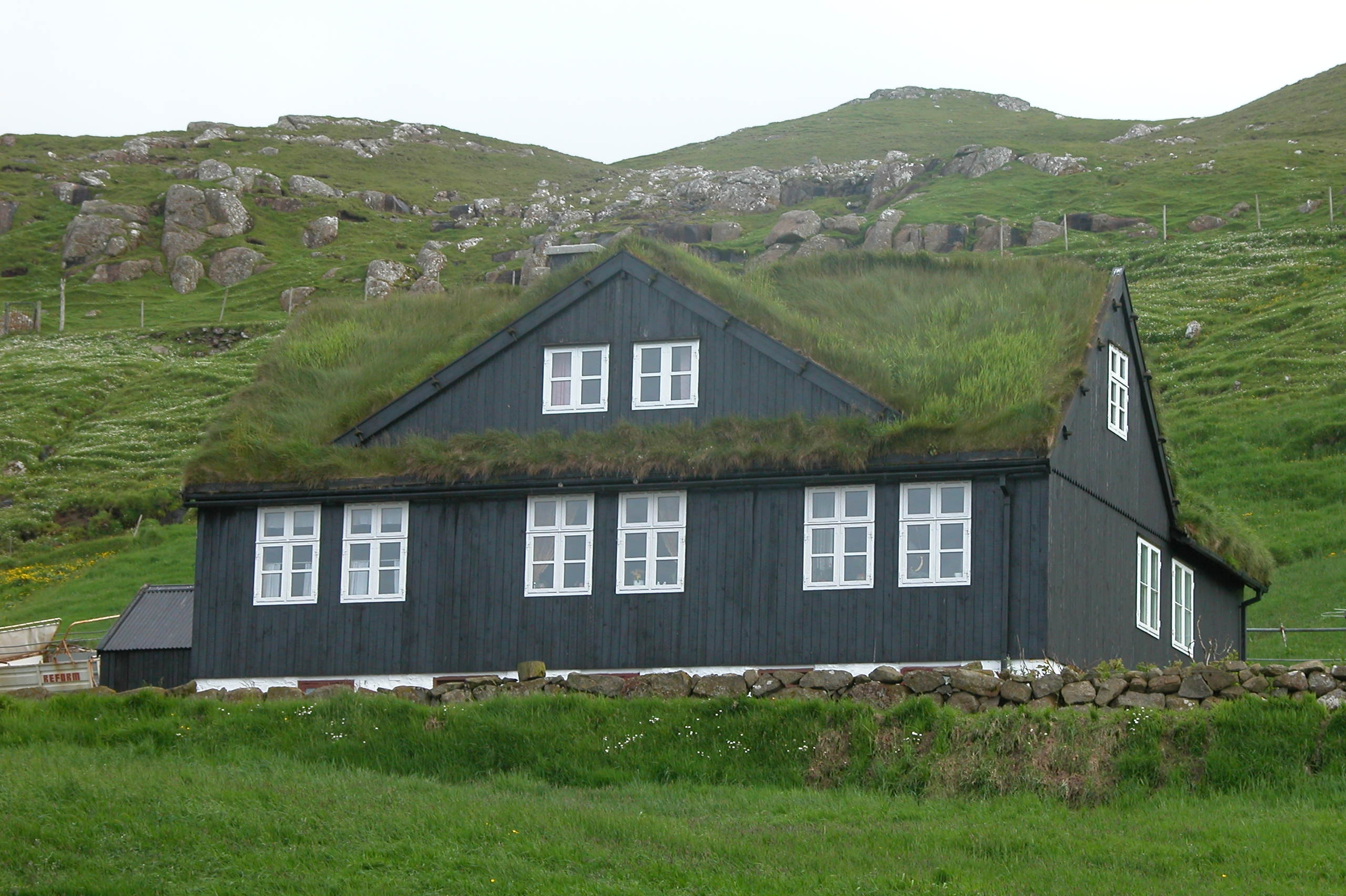

== See also ==
- List of towns in the Faroe Islands
- Streymoy

== Related reading ==
- Swaney, Deanna (June 1999) [1991]. Iceland, Greenland & the Faroe Islands (3rd ed.). Lonely Planet Publications. ISBN 0-86442-453-1.
