= Music of the Faroe Islands =

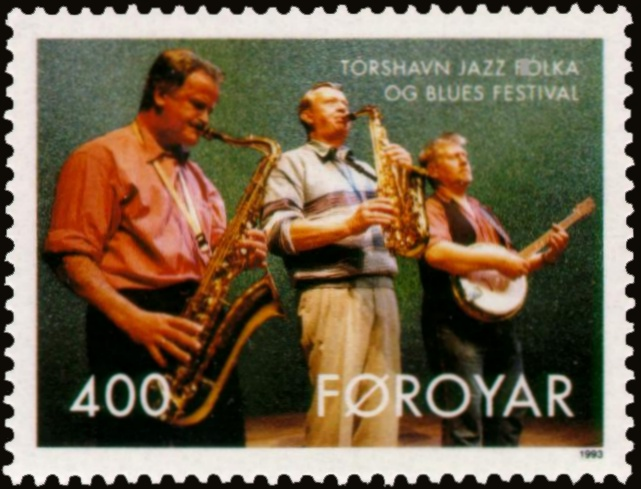
Faroese Jazz, Folk and Blues festival.

Faroese music is primarily vocal, accompanied by the fiddle (which arrived in the 17th century) and European dances like the minuet and polka. During the twentieth century choirs have played an important role in the musical history of the Faroes, and some of the best known current choirs are Tarira, Havnarkórið, Tórshavnar Manskór, Ljómur, Fuglafjarðar Gentukór, and the choirs situated in Copenhagen: Húsakórið and Mpiri.

== History ==
Much of the imported music and instruments remained popular only in the capital and largest city, Tórshavn. Rural peoples remained true to traditions of chain dance and ballads. The three types of dance ballads are kvæði, tættir and vísur. Many of these dance forms were revived after World War 2, when a number of dance societies were formed. The ballads were largely compiled in Corpus Carminum Færoensium, which collected over 44,000 stanzas.

Other songs include skjaldur, fantastic fairy tales sung by adults for children, and pitch-sliding, microtonal hymns called kingosálmar. In her magnum opus about Faroese folk singing, Marianne Clausen comprehensively described the various genres, and presented about 3,300 music transcriptions of folk singing melodies.

== Modern musicians ==
Modern Faroese musicians who have fused native traditions with music from Scotland, Bulgaria and the Sami people of northern Scandinavia:

- Kristian Blak
- Enekk
- Gunnar
- Annika Hoydal
- Lennart Kullgren

Other well known Faroese musicians include:

- Reiley
- Eivør Pálsdóttir
- Teitur Lassen
- Lena Anderssen
- Høgni Lisberg
- Høgni Reistrup
- Guðrið Hansdóttir
- Greta Svabo Bech
- Petur Pólson
- Terji Rasmussen
- Arnold Ludvig
- Evi Tausen
- Hallur Joensen
- Hanus G. Johansen
- Elin Brimheim Heinesen
- Heine Lützen
- Ólavur Jakobsen
- Kári av Reyni
- Kári P.
- Alex Bærendsen
- Regin Dahl
- Davur Juul Magnussen
- Simon Von Konoy
- Ólavur Olsen
- Eyðun Nolsøe
- Guðrun Sólja Jacobsen
- Kári Sverisson
- Steintór Rasmussen
- Anna Katrin Egilstrøð
- Brandur Enni
- Linda Andrews
- Lyon Hansen
- Jens Marni Hansen
- Uni Arge
- Leivur Thomsen
- Sissal

== Modern bands ==
Well known Faroese bands include (in alphabetical order)

- 200
- Analog Norð
- Arnold Ludvig Sextet
- Boys in a Band
- Byrta
- Clickhaze
- Danny & The Veetos
- Deiggj
- Devon
- The Dreams
- Eivør
- Faroe Boys
- Frændur
- Gestir
- the Ghost
- Glóð
- Goodiepal
- Hamferð
- Hamradun
- Heidrik
- Heljareyga
- Hjarnar
- Høgni Reistrup
- Joe and the ShitBoys
- Kiasmos
- Lama Sea
- Lena
- maður:glotti
- Makrel
- Marius
- Moirae (band)
- Mold
- MonkeyRat
- MC-Hár
- Nalja
- Oniontree
- ORKA
- Páll Finnur Páll
- Present Past
- Punjab
- Sic
- Safir
- The Story Ends
- Swangah
- Synarchy
- Teitur
- Týr
- Valravn
- Yggdrasil

== Modern classical composers ==
There are also some quite famous Faroese classical composers. Sunleif Rasmussen is until now the only Faroese ever to have written a symphony. Other composers are Kristian Blak, Edvard N. Debess, Janus Rasmussen, Tróndur Bogason, Kári Bæk, Palli Hansen, Knút Olsen and Pauli í Sandágerði.

Classical ensemble Aldubáran has commissioned and performed a vast amount of music from Faroese composers and performed it domestically and abroad.

== Details on specific musicians and groups ==
=== Gestir ===
Gestir are signed to Tutl Records in the Faroe Islands. They were formed in 2002, and have been playing rock festivals in the Faroe Islands, Denmark and other countries. Their long-awaited debut album Burtur frá Toftunum was released in the Faroe Islands in July 2006. In the summer of 2006 Gestir played the "Atlantic Music Event" at NASA (Reykjavik, Iceland), the G! Festival (Gota, Faroe Islands) and Nord-Atlantiske Brygge (Copenhagen, Denmark). On September 30, 2006, Gestir performed a special concert at the Nordic House, Torshavn, Faroe Islands, in celebration of their album release. In December 2006 Gestir were invited to play at faroese singer/songwriter Teitur´s special Christmas show at Store Vega, Copenhagen. Gestir's most significant concerts in the summer of 2005 were the G! Festival and at Lille Vega, Copenhagen. Gestir won the bi-annual Faroese music contest Prix Føroyar in 2003.

The members of Gestir are Ólavur Jákupsson (vocals, electric & acoustic guitars, synthesizers, piano), Torfinnur Jákupsson (electric & acoustic guitars, piano, lyrics), Jógvan Andreas á Brúnni (drums), Niels Jákup i Jógvanstovu (bass) and Knút Háberg Eysturstein (synthesizers, hammond, piano, rhodes).

=== Aldubáran ===
The chamber ensemble Aldubáran is the only professional ensemble of its kind in the Faroe Islands. Formed in 1995, it has had a huge impact on the modern classical scene in the Faroe Islands. The purpose of Aldubáran was to perform classical music and to commission Faroese music from composers and to perform this domestically and abroad. Since its formation, the ensemble has become a household name. Especially the collaboration with folk-singer Hanus G. Johansen and their release in 2000 of album Bouquet on the label Tutl, had a broad impact, and still is a big seller. Since then Aldubáran has released four albums on Tutl. Aldubáran was in 2004 nominated for the Nordic Council Music Prize. Aldubáran has toured extensively and in autumn 2006, Aldubáran produced and played the first ever Faroese opera The Madmans' Garden by composer Sunleif Rasmussen. The members of Aldubáran are: Andrea Heindriksdóttir (flute), Anna Klett (clarinet), Páll Sólstein (horn), Joost Bosdijk (bassoon), Sámal Petersen, Øssur Bæk, Jón Festirstein (violins), Angelika Hansen (viola), Andreas T Restorff (cello), Ólavur Olsen (trumpet), Johan Hentze (trumpet), Kristina Thede Johansen (saxophone), Ólavur Jakobsen (guitar), Jóhannes Andreasen (piano), and Bernharður Wilkinson (conductor).

=== Týr ===
A folk metal band with progressive elements, whose members hail from the Faroes. The band is known for performing traditional Faroese material both live and on recordings. They compose songs in both Faroese and English, often with Viking or Pagan subject matter.

The group has released seven albums since their founding in 1998 and they perform worldwide.

== Record labels ==
Tutl Records is the major record label of the Faroe Islands.

== Music festivals in the Faroe Islands ==
- G! Festival
- Tórshavn Jazz Festival
- Summarfestivalurin
