= Summarfestivalurin =

Musical festival in Klaksvík in the Faroe Islands

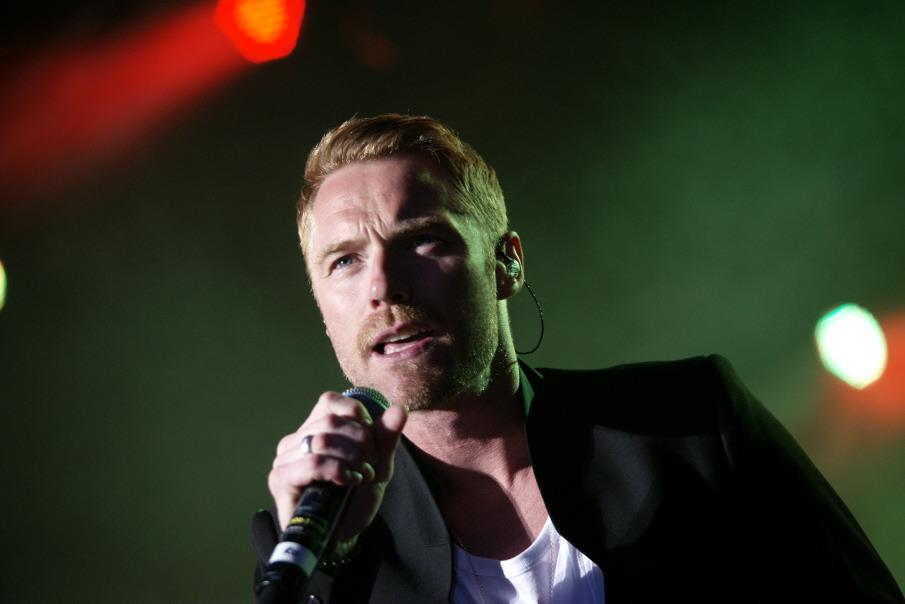
Ronan Keating performing on Summarfestivalurin

Summarfestivalurin (the Summer Festival) is a musical festival in Klaksvík in the Faroe Islands, established in 2004.

== History ==
=== 2004 ===
Summarfestivalurin - The Summer Festival - was held for the first time in August 2004 in Klaksvík in the Faroe Islands. Only 3000 tickets were printed this year and all tickets were sold. The main attraction were Ken Hensley known from the British group Uriah Heep (UK), Boney M (DE) and the two very popular local bands Frændur (FO) and Hjarnar (FO).

=== 2005 ===
In 2005 the main attractions was former Westlife Brian McFadden (EI), Anne Linnet (DK), Shakin' Stevens (UK) and the local band Dynamit. More than 6000 tickets were sold this year.

=== 2006 ===
In 2006 the main attractions were Maggie Reilly (UK), F. R. David (FR), The Rasmus (FN), Johnny Deluxe (DK) and former Supertramp Roger Hodgson (CN). Over 8000 people bought tickets to the festival in 2006.

=== 2007 ===
The 2007 the festival was bigger than ever. It was almost sold out - the authorities allow a maximum of 10.000 people. The main attraction Friday night was the German band the Scorpions. Other main attractions were Kim Wilde (UK), Bryan Rice (DK), Banaroo (DE), Amy Diamond (SE) and local cult band Húskallar. On Saturday the weather became so bad that the authorities closed the festival due to security reasons. It meant that the Kim Wilde and Húskallar concerts were cancelled.

=== 2008 ===
The lineup for the 2008 festival includes: Melanie C (UK), Alphabeat (DK), Smokie (UK), the Ghost (FO), The Dreams (FO) and Páll Finnur Páll (FO).

=== 2009 ===
The lineup for the 2009 festival includes: Robin Gibb (UK), Nik & Jay (DK), Abba The Show, Frændur (FO), The Dreams (FO), Boys In A Band (FO), Høgni Lisberg (FO), Dynamitt (FO), Hanus G. Johansen (FO), Hallur Joensen (FO), Moby The Pink Pilot (FO), Anfinn & Co. (FO), Páll Finnur Páll (FO), Chase (FO), FAROE5 (FO), Guðrið Hansdóttir (FO), Credo (UK), Anna Háberg (FO), Grandma´s Basement (FO), DJ Cool & DJ Tech, Sámal Ravnsfjall (FO), Niels Midjord & Lív Næs (FO), Uni Arge (FO), Terji Rasmussen (FO), Rógvi Jakobsen (FO), TNT (NO).

=== 2010 ===
The 2010 Summer Festival in Klaksvík was even bigger than the years before, 12.000 tickets were sold. The main attraction of the 2010 Summer Festival was Westlife. Also the Danish group Shu-Bi-Dua, a well known name in the Faroe Islands. Other well known Faroese groups and singers who performed at the Summarfestivalurin were: Páll Finnur Páll, Brandur Enni and his brother Tróndur Enni together with Lív Næss, Guðrið Hansdóttir, Uni Arge, Tinganest, Oniontree, Hanus G. Johansen, Eyðun Nolsøe and Terji Rasmussen from Frændur, Dynamitt from Klaksvík performed together with Steintór Rasmussen from the group Frændur, he was one of the founders of Summarfestivalurin. They had luck with the weather this year, the weather was dry most of the time. In 2009 some parts of the festival had to be canceled because of strong winds and too much rain. In 2010 the Summer Festival was held in the first weekend of August starting on 5 August, ending on Saturday 7 August 2010.

Two events were different at the Summarfestivalurin 2010. The final in the Faroe Islands Cup, which in Faroese is called Løgmanssteypið, was played in Klaksvík at the same time as the Summarfestivalurin was being held. They had a break with the concerts while the match was being played. The final was between ÍF Fuglafjørður and EB/Streymur. The winner was EB/Streymur and they were honored on the large stage in the festival area. The other event was the celebration of the Faroese rower from the little village Hvannasund, north of Klaksvík, Livar Nysted. He just finished rowing cross the North Atlantic Ocean from New York City to Scilly Isles in the United Kingdom in 44 days, which was a new world record, the old record was 114 years old. Livar Nysted was rowing together with 3 other men: Leven Brown from Edinburgh, Ray Carroll from Galway in Ireland and Don Lennox from Glasgow.

=== 2011 ===
The lineup for the 2011 festival includes Rasmus Seebach (DA), Bobby Bare (USA), D-A-D (DA), Basim (DA), Babou (DA), Frændur (FO), Grandma´s Basement (FO), 4 (FO), Evi Tausen (FO), Hjarnar (FO), Anna Faroe (FO), Páll Finnur Páll (FO), Jens Marni Hansen (FO), Hanus G. Johansen (FO), Divaz (FO), Eyðun & Terji (FO), Rógvi Jakobsen (FO), Kim Hansen (FO), Robert McBirnie (FO), T.O.S. (Faroese band) (FO), Brandur Enni (FO), Martin Joensen (FO), ORKA (FO), Dickie Lee Erwin (USA), G. Thomas, Stanley Samuelsen (FO), Deiggj (FO), Debess Blues Station (Edvard Nyholm Debess and Uni Debess) (FO), Kular Røtur (FO), Dánial og Bjarki (FO), Herborg og vinir (FO), Leadberry (FO), Xperiment (FO), Lív & The Zoo (FO), Lisa í Dali (FO), Elin Brimheim Heinesen (FO) and Jens Eli Ellefsen (FO).

=== 2012 ===
The artists and bands which performed at the Summarfestival 2012 were these:

Ronan Keating (EI), Fate (DK), Sveinur (FO), Ólavur Presley & His Dirty Rag Rags (FO), Kim Hansen (FO), Divaz (FO), Kristina Bærendsen (FO), Glóð (FO), Grandma´s Basement (FO), Guðrið Hansdóttir (FO), Bárður Johannesen (FO), Tinganest (FO), TV-2 (DK), Russ Taff, Terji & Føstufressar (FO), Frændur (FO), Dynamit (FO), Swangah Dangah (FO), Páll Finnur Páll (FO), Evi Tausen (FO), Hanus G. Johansen (FO), Jákup Eli Joensen (FO), and Hans Andrias (FO).
