= Heinesen =

Heinesen is a Faroese name. Notable people with the surname include:

- Elin Brimheim Heinesen (born 1958), Faroese journalist
- Jens Pauli Heinesen (1932–2011), Faroese writer
- Knud Heinesen (1932–2025), Danish politician
- William Heinesen (1900–1991), Faroese writer
- Zacharias Heinesen (born 1936), Faroese painter
