= Ólavur Jakobsen =

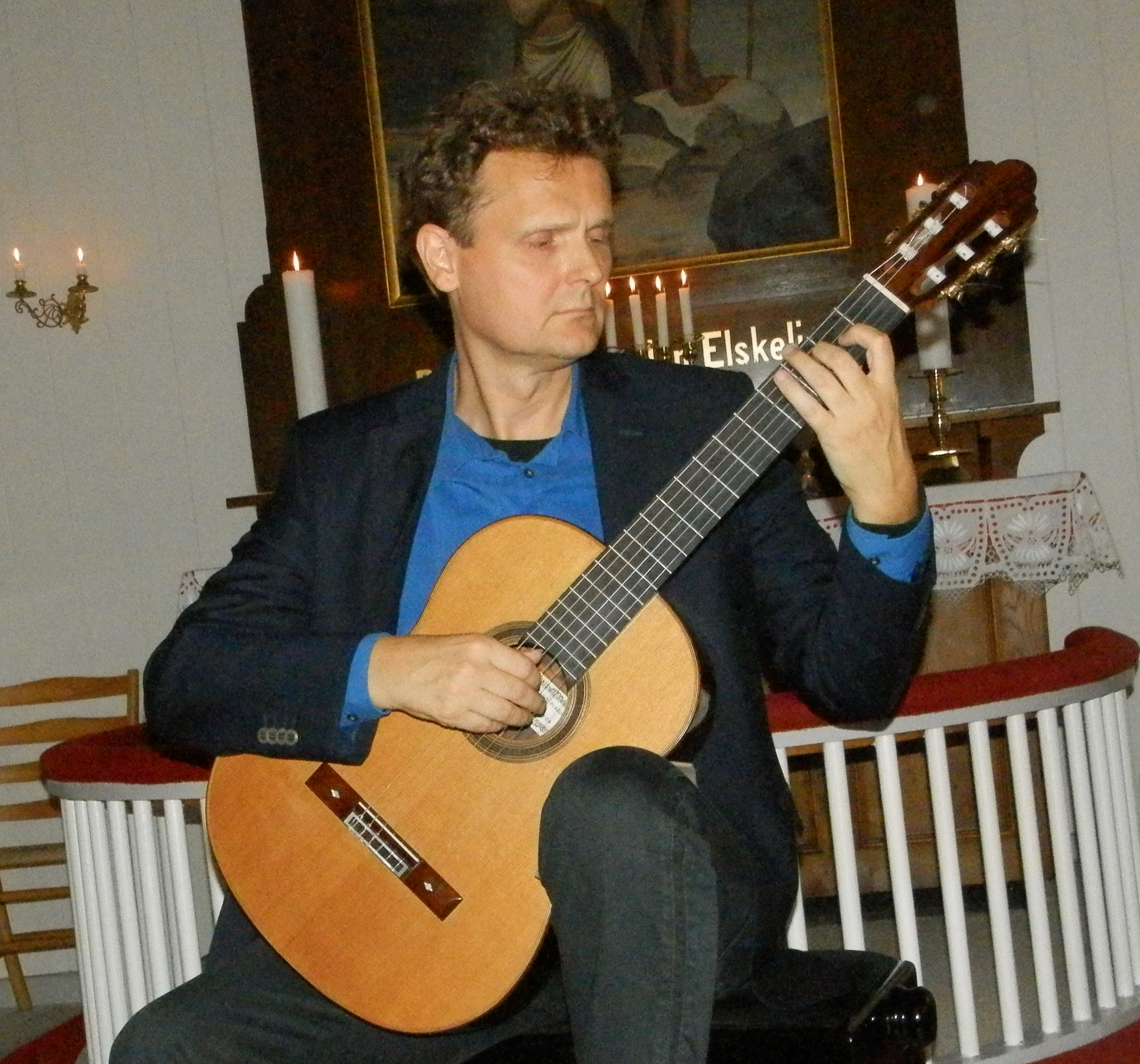
Ólavur Jakobsen in 2014.

Ólavur Jakobsen (born 1964), is a classical guitarist. He was born in Tórshavn, Faroe Islands, and studied at the Royal Danish Academy of Music in Copenhagen with Ingolf Olsen, where he received his masters diploma in 1995. Further studies in Paris with French guitarist Roland Dyens. Has participated in masterclasses with e.g. Sir Julian Bream and David Russell.

Olavur Jakobsen is the first Faroese classical guitarist to hold a master's degree and also to perform at a professional level. As a soloist and chamber musician, he has toured extensively all over Europe, South Africa and the United States.

He is a former member of the Copenhagen-based Corona Guita Quartet

He has premièred a vast number of compositions by e.g. Per Nørgård, Axel Borup-Jørgensen, Pierre Dørge, Sunleif Rasmussen, Edvard Nyholm Debess, Kári Bæk, Tróndur Bogason and Kristian Blak and has worked with composers such as Gavin Bryars and Hsueh-Yung Shen.

He has also worked as a sessions musician with a number of popular artists e.g. Hanus G., Teitur, Ernst Sondum Dalsgard, Runi Brattaberg and Hakan Hagegard as well as Brandenburgische Staatsorchester in Frankfurt, Germany, Icelandic Ensemble CAPUT and Danish orchestra Collegium Musicum.

Olavur Jakobsen is a sought after arranger and has produced albums for Hanus G., Sunleif Rasmussen and Aldubáran.

He co-founded and then formerly served as the artistic director of the Faroese chamber ensemble Aldubáran and now continues as an active musician and board member.

Ólavur Jakobsen was an instigator of and from 2005 to 2020 he led and coordinated the Music High School Preparatory Course for gifted music students in the Faroe Islands.

In November 2012 he released the first ever Faroese classical guitar album to rave reviews in the international press e.g. Classical Guitar Magazine and Gitarre und Laute.

Ólavur Jakobsen currently lives in Hoyvík near Tórshavn and is active in promoting Faroese music and touring as a soloist and chamber musician.

== Discography ==
=== Solo albums ===
- Awake, my Soul, and Sound your Strings (solo album with Faroese music for guitar), Label TUTL November 2012 Discography
- Forever Gone (with Brandenburgisches Staatsorchester) Music by Oli Jogvansson, single-track, Label Baroli Music May 2015

=== Collaborations ===
Albums, in which Ólavur Jakobsen has composed, produced, arranged music and/or plays guitar:

- Eftir Regnið (Lív Dam)(1989/HCWTórgarð)
- Boreas (1994/Tutl)
- Advents- og Jólasálmar (Ernst S. Dalsgarð)
- Surrounded (CAPUT/2003/BIS)
- Dedicated (Aldubáran)(2003/Tutl)
- Tú lýsti (Stiðin/Regin Dahl)(1998/Stiðin)
- Nicolina syngur í Sandavágs kirkju (2003/Tutl)
- Signaða sól (Sanna í Brekkunum)
- Bouquet (Hanus/Aldubáran) (2000)
- Afturundirgerð (Aldubáran)
- Just Before the Dawn (Corona Guitar Kvartet)
- Dámliga Gøtan (Tvey av Kamarinum)
- Don Quixotte (Kim Helweg) (Collegium Musicum)
- Glóð (Music by Páll Sólstein/Aldubáran) (2006)
- frå leddiken (Hanus G. Johansen/Aldubáran) (2006)
- Fýra bjarkir (Peter Hentze Niclasen) Works by Britten, Dowland, Restorff, Højgaard and Dahl (2009)
- Dancing Raindrops (Sunleif Rasmussen) (2011)
- Janus er ein stjørna (Aldubáran) 2011
- Light and Darkness (with Anna Klett, clarinet) Music by Kristian Blak TUTL December 2012
- If you wait (Track 2 on Story Music by Teitur (2013)
- Hitt blinda liðið - Music by Gavin Bryars 2014
- Music from the Faroe Islands 2 (Compilation (Various artists) (2015) TUTL
- Lost and Found (With Ensemble Svabonio) (2017) Music by Jens Christian Svabo TUTL
- Wasser und Rosen for two guitar (2023) - Music by Per Nørgård - Ólavur Jakobsen and Leif Hesselberg, guitars
