= Hanus Kamban =

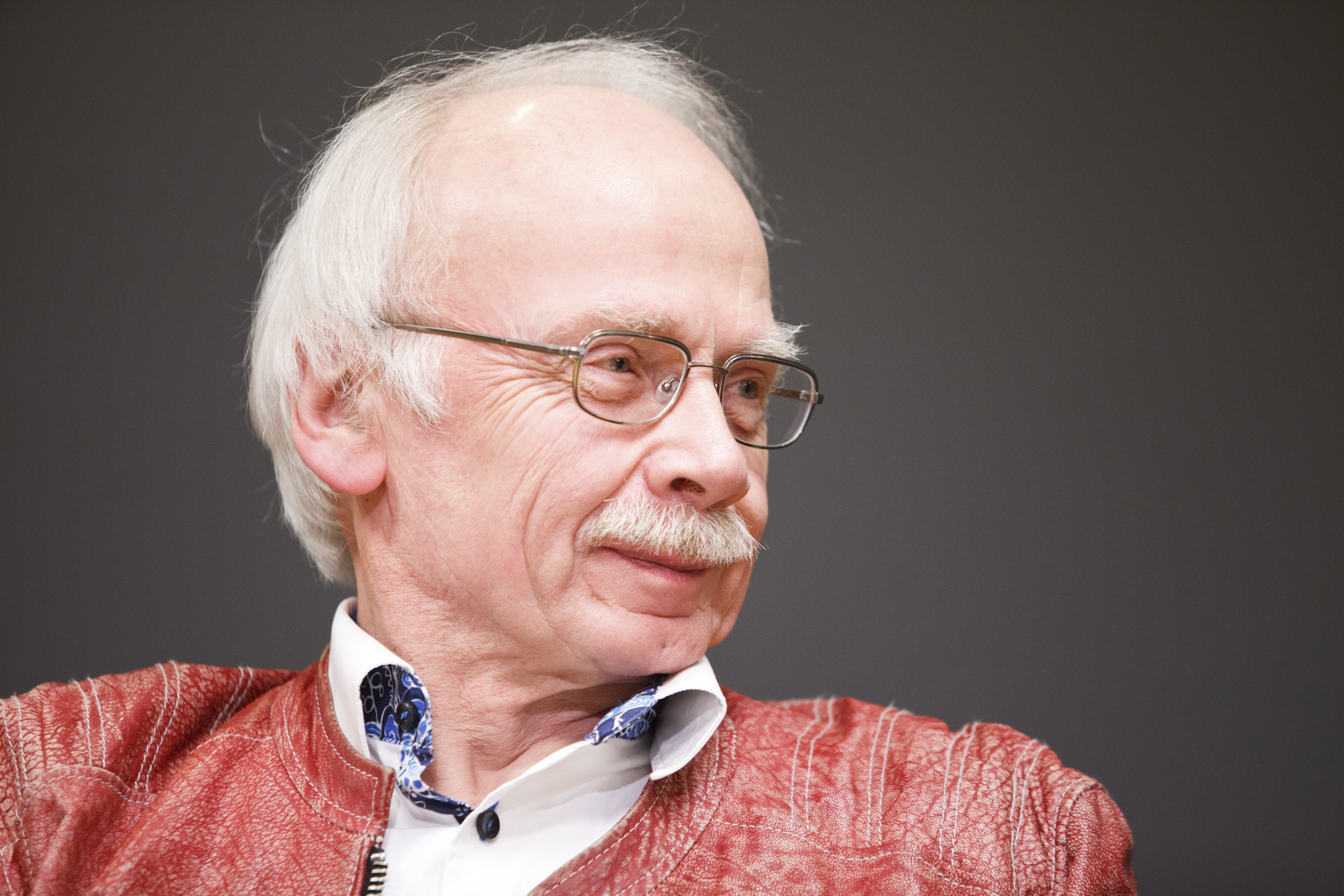
- Hanus Kamban at the Nordic Council Literature Prize 2012
- Born: 25 June 1942 (age 84); Saltangará, Faroe Islands
- Occupation: Essayist
- Writing career
- Language: Faroese

Hanus Kamban (born 25 June 1942 in Saltangará, Faroe Islands) is a Faroese short story writer, essayist, biographer and poet. He was born Hanus Andreassen, but changed his last name to Kamban in 2000.

Kamban grew up on the small island of Skúvoy and moved to Tórshavn in 1956.

He writes about the quite sudden modernisation of the Faroese society post World War II. He published his first short story anthology in 1980, and has translated William Shakespeare, Kafka, Graham Greene and other great writers and poets from other countries to Faroese. From 1994 to 1997 he published a three-volume biography of one of the most important Faroese poets, Janus Djurhuus. It was translated into Danish and published in two volumes in 2001. He was nominated to the Nordic Council's Literature Prize for the first time in 2003 for his short story anthology Pílagrímar (Pilgrims). In 2012 he was nominated for the second time to the Nordic Council's Literature Prize, this time for his short story anthology Gullgentan, which was published in Faroese in 2010 and in Danish in 2012. The title means "The Golden Girl".

Kamban won the Faroese Literature Prize, which in Faroese is called Mentanarvirðisløn M. A. Jacobsens, in 1980 and again in 1986. In 2004 he won the Faroese Cultural Prize. In February/March 2013 Kamban was invited to the Kennedy Center in Washington DC for the Nordic Cool Festival. He was one of the Nordic writers/poets on the Literature Panel with the theme In the Cracks Between the Lines – Magic Realism of the North.

He was president of the Association of Writers of the Faroe Islands (Rithøvundafelag Føroya) 1992–94.

== Bibliography ==
=== Short story anthologies ===
- Dóttir av Proteus, 1980
- Við tendraðum lyktum, 1982
- Hotel heyst, 1986
- Pílagrímar 2001
- Gullgentan, 2010 (Nominated for the Nordic Council's Literature Prize 2012)
  - Guldpigen, 2012 (translated into Danish by Kirsten Brix)

=== Short stories and poems published in magazines etc. ===
- Angels Place, published 2001 in the short story anthology Mjørki í heilum (14 short stories chosen from the 42 short stories which were sent to a competition, arranged by Listastevna Føroya).
- Tað nýggja Atlantis (The New Atlantis), published 2002
- Two poems published in Vencil 1, published 2006
- Two poems published in Vencil 2, 2007
- Riddarin Grøni (The Green Knight) í Vencil 5, 2008
- Saxifraga Nivalis, published in Vencil 8, 2010

=== Poems ===
- Cafe Europa, 2008

=== Biographies ===
- 1994 – Hjalmar Söderberg (short biography)
- 1994 – J.H.O. Djurhuus – ein bókmentalig ævisøga I
- 1995 – J.H.O. Djurhuus – ein bókmentalig ævisøga II
- 1997 – J.H.O. Djurhuus – ein bókmentalig ævisøga III
  - 2001 J.H.O. Djurhuus : en litteraer biografi, Universitetsforlag, Odense 2001 (Odense University studies in Scandiavian language and literature; 46. 2 Vol., I. 1881–1922, II. 1922–1948. Translated from Faroese to Danish by Kirsten Brix)
- 2003 – Jósef Stalin (about the life and politics of Joseph Stalin)

=== Plays ===
- 2000 – Heystveingir (sjónleikur)

=== Anthologies with articles by Kamban, translations, poems ets. ===
- Kveikt og kannað (poems, articles and translations by Rikard Long), 1979
- Tíðartinnur (anthology with articles), 1986
- Tann bráðvakra hugsjónin (anthology with articles), 2000
- Heimahøllin (cantata together with the Faroese composer Kári Bæk), 2001

=== Essays ===
- 2007 – Hjarta uttan fylgisneyta: Herman Bang 150 ár (essay)

=== Translations ===
- 1969 – Drekin og aðrar søgur (Graham Greene, H. G. Wells, Ray Bradbury, William Somerset Maugham)
- 1979 – Dreymur um eitt undarligt land (Graham Greene)
- 1989 – Othello (William Shakespeare)
- 1991 – Tey deyðu (James Joyce)
- 2013 – Daphnis og Chloe (Longos)

== Recognition ==
- 1980 – Literature award M.A. Jacobsen's Faroese Literature Prize for non-fiction.
- 1986 – Literature award M.A. Jacobsen's Faroese Literature Prize for fiction.
- 2001 – Won Listastevna Føroya's short story competition with his short story "Angel's Place" .
- 2003 – Mentanarvirðisløn Landsins (Faroese Cultural Award, given by the Faroese government)
