= Tróndur Bogason =

Faroese composer and musician

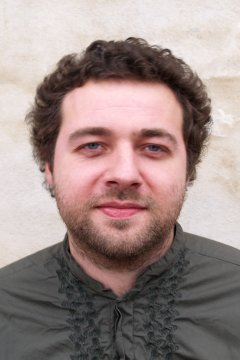
Tróndur Bogason

Tróndur Bogason (born 5 April 1976 as Tróndur Bogason Hansen) is a Faroese composer and musician. He composes classical works, but he also arranges music for pop, rock and folk artists. He is married to the Faroese singer Eivør Pálsdóttir with whom he also works; they arranged her album Room together. Bogason was educated at the Royal Danish Academy of Music. He has been nominated three times for the Nordic Council Music Prize and is one of the few who have received a three-year grant from Mentanargrunnur Landsins.

== Career ==
He was born and grew up in the capital of the Faroe Islands, Tórshavn. In the nineties he moved to Copenhagen to study. While living in Denmark he played an active role in Faroese music amongst other Faroese musicians in Copenhagen. He was an active member of the first Faroese rap band MC-Hár, which plays rap and rock music in the Faroese language. He left the band in some periods, but came back and is still a member of the band. He is also a member of the Faroese choir in Copenhagen, Mpiri, which he and others founded in 1998.

Bogason studied at the Royal Danish Academy of Music in Copenhagen and at The Royal Conservatoire in Den Haag from 1999 to 2005. From 2005 to 2007 he continued his studies, attending the soloist program in composition at The Royal Danish Conservatory.

His music has been performed by a wide selection of Faroese and international performers around the world. In recent years, he has also arranged for a number of folk/pop/rock artists including Hanus G. Johansen, Teitur Lassen, Guðrið Hansdóttir and Eivør Pálsdóttir. In 2010 he was nominated for the Nordic Council Music Prize for the third time. He has also co-worked with classical composers, musicians and ensembles, e.g., Ólavur Jakobsen, Sunleif Rasmussen and the Faroese ensemble Aldubáran.

== Education ==
- 1999–2005: The Masters program in composition at the Royal Danish Academy of Music in Copenhagen with Ib Nørholm & Hans Abrahamsen; and at The Royal Conservatoire in Den Haag with Martijn Padding and Louis Andriessen.
- 2005–2007: The Soloist program in composition at the Royal Danish Academy of Music with Bent Sørensen.

== Works ==
This list is not complete

Title	Instrument	Year	Duration
Don't try this at a party		2010	
Barbara	perc, SATB, electronics	2009	53 min
Svøvnurin	gtr, cl, perc, voice, electronics	2009	12 min
Butterfly	pno, perc	2009	17 min
Laika	pno	2008	25 min
Glue	vln, vla, cl	2008	7 min
Babel	string, woodwind, pno, trb, perc, electronics	2008	60 min
Nocturne 1	SATB	2008	10 min
Investigations of a dog	trb, electronics	2007	65 min
The puzzle	symphony orchestra	2007	14 min
Exchanges	pno	2006	8 min
Kugellampen	cl, electronics	2005	14 min
Aliens	pno, trb	2004	20 min
Wer Herrscht?	vlc, acc, fl, voice	2004	8 min
Asonata	string, electronics	2004	12 min
Prælog	sinfonietta	1999	6 min

== Awards, nominations, funds etc. ==
- 2006 – Won 1st prize in a competition by GHM for musical works for Symphonic Wind Band. Bogason won with his work Konstantin T.
- 2006 – Nominated for the Nordic Council Music Prize for his musical work Seven Musicians for trombone and electronics
- 2008 – Nominated for the Nordic Council Music Prize for Investigations of a dog, based on a short story by Franz Kafka Forschungen eines Hundes
- 2010 – Nominated for the Nordic Council Music Prize for Butterfly, a work for piano and percussion.
- 2010 – 3-year grant from the Mentanargrunnur Landsins, which is a fund under the Faroese government

== Family ==
Bogason is the son of Faroese writer Bergtóra Hanusardóttir and Faroese marine biologist Bogi Hansen. He has one sister, Ragnheiður Bogadóttir, who is three years younger. Bogason married Faroese singer Eivør Pálsdóttir in 2012.
