= MPIR =

MPIR may refer to:

- Max Planck Institute for Radio Astronomy, in Bonn, Germany
- MPIR (mathematics software)

== See also ==
- Mpiri
- Minnesota Public Interest Research Group
