= Jens Pauli Heinesen =

Faroese writer (1932–2011)

Jens Pauli Heinesen (2 November 1932 in Sandavágur − 19 July 2011 in Tórshavn) was a Faroese writer. He received the Faroese Literature Prize four times and the Faroese Cultural Prize once. From 1968 to 1975, Heinesen was president of the Association of Writers of the Faroe Islands (Rithøvundafelag Føroya). He wrote novels, short stories, poems, plays, a children's book, and translated books from foreign languages into Faroese.

== Biography ==
Jens Pauli Heinesen's parents were Petur Heinesen á Lofti, a farmer from Sandavágur, and Anna Maria Malena Heinesen (born Johannesen) from the small island of Hestur. He grew up in the village of Sandavágur. At 14 years old, he moved to Tórshavn, where he worked briefly at an office and published his first book, Degningsælið, before finishing high school in 1954. After graduating, he moved to Denmark, where he studied at Emdrupborg Statsseminarium and became a school teacher in 1956.

In August 1956, he married Maud Brimheim from Klaksvík. They had a daughter, Elin Brimheim Heinesen, in 1958, and later adopted a second daughter, Marianna, from Korea. The family moved back to the Faroe Islands in 1957. Maud Heinesen (born Brimheim) later became a writer of children's books.

== Bibliography ==
Jens Pauli Heinesen wrote with a colloquial rather than an academic tone, claiming that he had to write in his own dialect. His writings are characterized by thematizing the development of Faroese society to modernity, with a critical vision of his contemporary cultural climate. Additionally, he wrote partially autobiographical novels such as the seven-volume series Á ferð inn í eina óendaliga søgu (On a journey into a Never-Ending Story). He also composed the poem Eitt dýpi av dýrari tíð (An Abyss of Precious Time) which was accompanied with melodies by his daughter Ellin. The poem was released in 1988 and remains a popular song on the island.

=== Novels ===
- Yrkjarin úr Selvík og vinir hansara, Tórshavn : Published by the author, 1958. – 211 pages. Second edition was published in 1981 by the Faroese Teachers' Association.
- Tú upphavsins heimur I, Tórshavn : Published by the author, 1962.
- Tú upphavsins heimur II, Tórsh. : Published by the author, 1964.
- Tú upphavsins heimur III, Tórsh. : Published by the author, 1966.
  - Tú upphavsins heimur – 2nd edition (changed), Kollafjørður : Árting, 1990. – 320 pages
- Frænir eitur ormurin – Tórsh.: Published by the author, 1973. – 466 pages
- Rekamaðurin, Tórshavn – Gestur, 1977. – 117 pages
- Tey telgja sær gudar – Tórshavn : Gestur, 1979. – 133 pages
- Nú ert tú mansbarn á foldum – Tórshavn : Gestur, 1980. – 162 pages, (Á ferð inn í eina óendaliga søgu; 1)
- Lýsir nú fyri tær heimurin – Tórshavn : Gestur, 1981. – 128 pages, (Á ferð inn í eina óendaliga søgu; 2)
- Leikur tín er sum hin ljósi dagur : novel, Tórshavn : Gestur, 1982. – 169 pages, (Á ferð inn í eina óendaliga søgu; 3)
- Markleys breiðist nú fyri tær fold : novel, Tórshavn : Gestur, 1983. – 192 pages, (Á ferð inn í eina óendaliga søgu; 4)
- Eitt dýpi av dýrari tíð, Tórsh. : Gestur, 1984. – 131 pages (Á ferð inn í eina óendaliga søgu; 5)
- Í andgletti – Tórsh. : Gestur, 1988. – 167 pages, (Á ferð inn í eina óendaliga søgu; 6)
- Bláfelli – Tórshavn : Gestur, 1992. – 246 pages, (Á ferð inn í eina óendaliga søgu; 7)
- Ein ódeyðilig sál – og aðrar, Tórshavn : Mentunargrunnur Studentafelagsins, 1999. – 297 pages
- Koparskrínið, Tórshavn : Mentunargrunnur Studentafelagsins, 2000. – 120 pages
- Hvør var Nimrod?, novel – Mentunargrunnur Studentafelagsins, 2004

=== Short stories ===
- Degningsælið – Tórshavn : Blaðstarv, 1953. – 99 pages, 2nd edition in 1978 at the publishing house Gestur, 180 pages.
- Hin vakra kvirran – Tórshavn : [s. n.], 1958 [i.e. 1959]. – 164 pages
- Gestur – Tórsh. : Eget forlag, 1967. – 103 pages
- Aldurnar spæla á sandi – Tórshavn : Eget forlag, 1969. – 152 pages
  - Bølgerne leger på stranden, Danish translation, 1980.
- Í aldingarðinum – Tórsh. : Eget forlag, 1971. – 112 pages
- Gamansleikur : søgur úr Krabburð – Tórshavn : Eget forlag, 1974. – 151 pages
- Dropar í lívsins havi : søgusavn – Tórshavn : Gestur, 1978. – 166 pages
- Tann gátuføri kærleikin – Tvøroyri : Hestur, 1986. – 158 pages
- Gamansleikur 2 : søgur úr Krabburð – Tórshavn : Gestur, 1995. – 142 pages
- Rósa Maria : short stories – Tórshavn : Mentunargrunnur Studentafelagsins, 1995. – 175 pages

=== Plays ===
- Uppi í eini eikilund – Tórshavn, 1970. – 49 pages
- Hvønn stakkin skal eg fara í, pápi : play about Annika í Dímun – in three parts. Tórshavn, 1975, 74 pages
- Fýra sjónleikir (Four plays) – Tórshavn : Gestur, 1985. – 227 pp Includes these plays:
  - Hvønn stakkin skal eg fara í, pápi – 1975
  - Vælkomnir, føringar, her í vási – 1978
  - Skuggarnir – 1979
  - Uppi í eini eikilund – 1969
- Sníkurin : læran um sálina : sjónleikur (play) – Tórshavn, 1989. – 38 pages

=== Children's books ===
- Brúsajøkul – Tórshavn: Føroya Lærarafelag, 1987. – 72

=== Translations ===
- Eitt dukkuheim : play (in three episodes) / by Henrik Ibsen – Tórshavn : Jens Pauli Heinesen translated into Faroese, 1984, 83 pages. Original title: Et dukkehjem
- Leingi livi lítla tokið – children's book – written and illustrated by Charlotte Steiner; Jens Pauli Heinesen translated into Faroese,

Tórshavn: Føroya Lærarafelag in co-operation with Illustrationsforlaget, [1958]. – 24 s. (Glæstribøkurnar; 4)

- Knassi, children's book by Sterling North; Jens Pauli Heinesen translated into Faroese, Tórshavn: Føroya Lærarafelag, 2000. – 191 s. original title: Rascal.

== Prizes ==
Jens Pauli Heinesen has four times received the Faroese Literature Prize (Mentanarvirðisløn M. A. Jacobsens) and one time the Faroese Cultural Prize (Mentanarvirðisløn Landsins).

- 1959 – Faroese Literature Prize
- 1969 – Faroese Literature Prize for the novel: Aldurnar spæla á sandi
- 1973 – Faroese Literature Prize for the series of novels: Frænir eitur ormurin
- 1993 – Faroese Literature Prize for the novel: Bláfelli og raðið (Á ferð inn í eina óendaliga søgu).
- 1999 – Mentanarvirðisløn Landsins (150.000 DKK)
