= Poul F. Joensen =

Faroese poet and writer

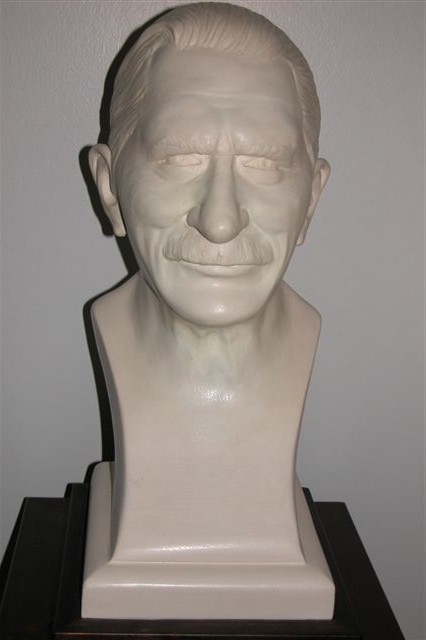
A bust of Poul F. Joensen

Poul Frederik Joensen (best known as Poul F.) (18 November 1898 in Sumba – 27 June 1970 in Froðba) was a Faroese poet and writer.

He is best known for his poems, both the satirical ones and his love poems. He worked as a school teacher for some years, but most of his life he worked as a sheep farmer and a labourer.

Poul F.'s work include translated poems by Heinrich Heine and Robert Burns. His first collection of poems Gaman og álvara (Novelty and severity) was published in 1924; it was the second collection of poetry by a Faroese poet published in the Faroe Islands. It was published by Felagið Varðin with Richard Long. The first collection of poems in the Faroese language was published in 1914, these poems were written by Janus Djurhuus, the title was Yrkingar which means Poems. He was awarded with the Faroese Literature Prize in 1963.

== Biography ==
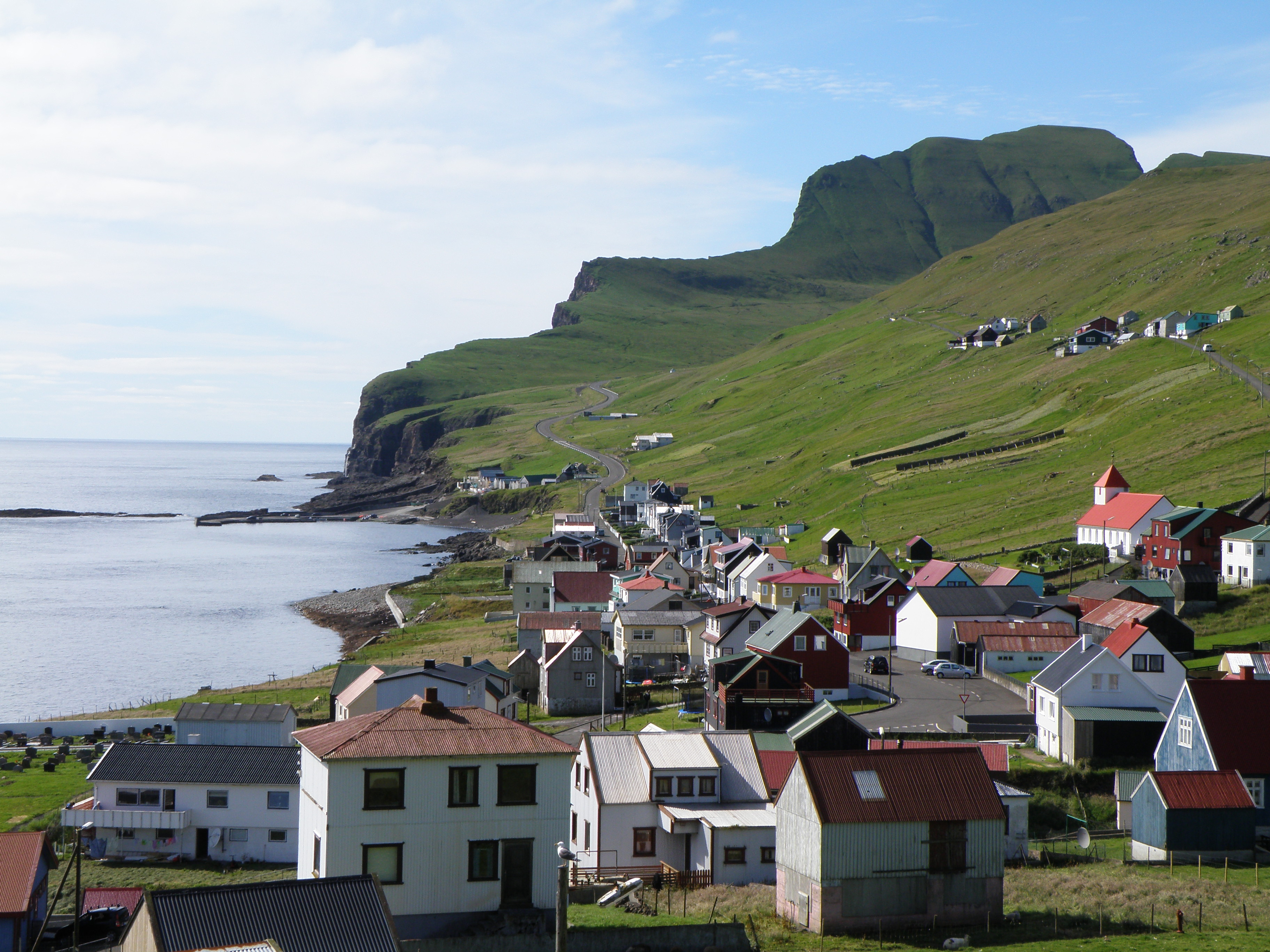
The village of Sumba, which is the southernmost village in the Faroe Islands. The neighbourhood of Hørg is up on the hillside. The mountain in the background is Beinisvørð, 470 metres high, often mentioned in Poul F. Joensen's poems. Beinisvørð has a green slope up to the top on this side and goes vertically down to the sea on the other side.

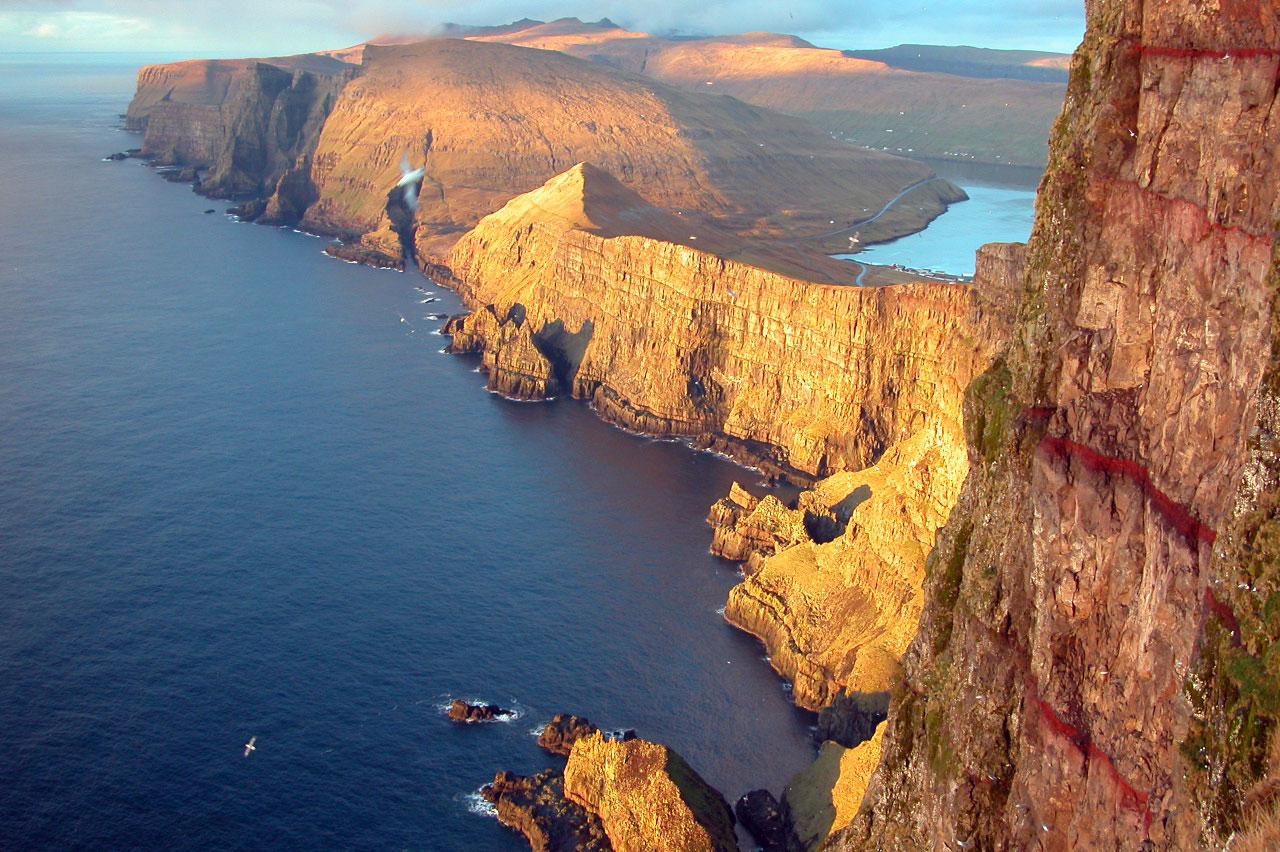
View from Beinisvørð.

Poul (Pól) F. Joensen was the son of Daniel Jacob Joensen from Hørg, Sumba and Anna Sofia, born Langaard, both came from the village of Sumba. Later he married Julia Mortensen from Froðba.

When Poul F. was 14 years old he tried to become a seaman as did many of his friends. He was a fisherman for one year. He wished to continue with life at sea and had plans to go fishing aboard the fishing vessel Robert Miller, but his parents wouldn't permit him to do so. Instead they sent him to Tórshavn, to study to become a teacher in public schools. Later it turned out that if he had gone fishing on Robert Miller on that trip, it would have been the last thing that he did, and no one would have known about his poetry ever. Robert Miller never returned from that trip in March 1914, and all the men onboard lost their lives. Poul F. Joensen graduated as a school teacher in 1917. He was teaching from 1919–27 in Froðba and again 1947–49 in Lopra; both villages are on Suðuroy. After teaching for eight years he decided to give up teaching and live as a writer and a sheep farmer and by working various jobs.

== Bibliography ==
- Gaman og álvara; poems (1924)
- Millum heims og heljar; poems (1942)
- Lívsins kvæði; poems (1955)
- Seggjasøgur úr Sumba I; folkloristic stories (1963)
- Ramar risti hann rúnirnar; poems (1967)
- Heilsan Pól F., collection of all four collections of poems by Poul F. Joensen, 556 pages. Collected and edited by Jonhard Mikkelsen, published by Sprotin (a Faroese publishing house) in 2012. The book includes a part of a recorded dialogue between Poul F. Joensen and Tórður Jóansson, made on the Poul F.'s 70-year's birthday in 1968. The conversation is an autobiography.

=== Poems by Poul F. on albums ===
The Faroese singer and composer Hanus G. Johansen has released two albums with poems by Poul F. Joensen. The first album, Gaman og álvara was released in 1988, the second in 2012. Gaman og álvara was first released as a vinyl LP and cassette, but some years later in 2008 it was released as a CD.

- Gaman og álvara – Hanus syngur Poul F. (Album released in 1988 by Hanus G. Johansen, who composed melodies for 14 poems by Poul F. Joensen)
- Hypnosan, 1990. Cassette with songs by various poems, at least one of the poems was by Poul F. Joensen: Kvæðið um Hargabrøður. Song by the football team of Sumba, which were promoted to the best division that year for the first time. Georg eystan Á arranged the songs. Hargabrøður means "The brothers from Hørg", Hørg is the placename of the neighbourhood of the village Sumba, where Poul F. grew up. The poem tells stories about how strong and bold they were (9 verses).
- Hørpuspælarin – (released on 19 November 2010) – Poems by Poul F. Joensen and in translation by Poul F., composed and sung by Hanus G. Johansen.
- Á fold eru túsund gudar – Poems by Poul F. Joensen, composed and sung by Hanus G. Johansen. Released on 18 November 2012 on Poul F's birthday

== Honour ==
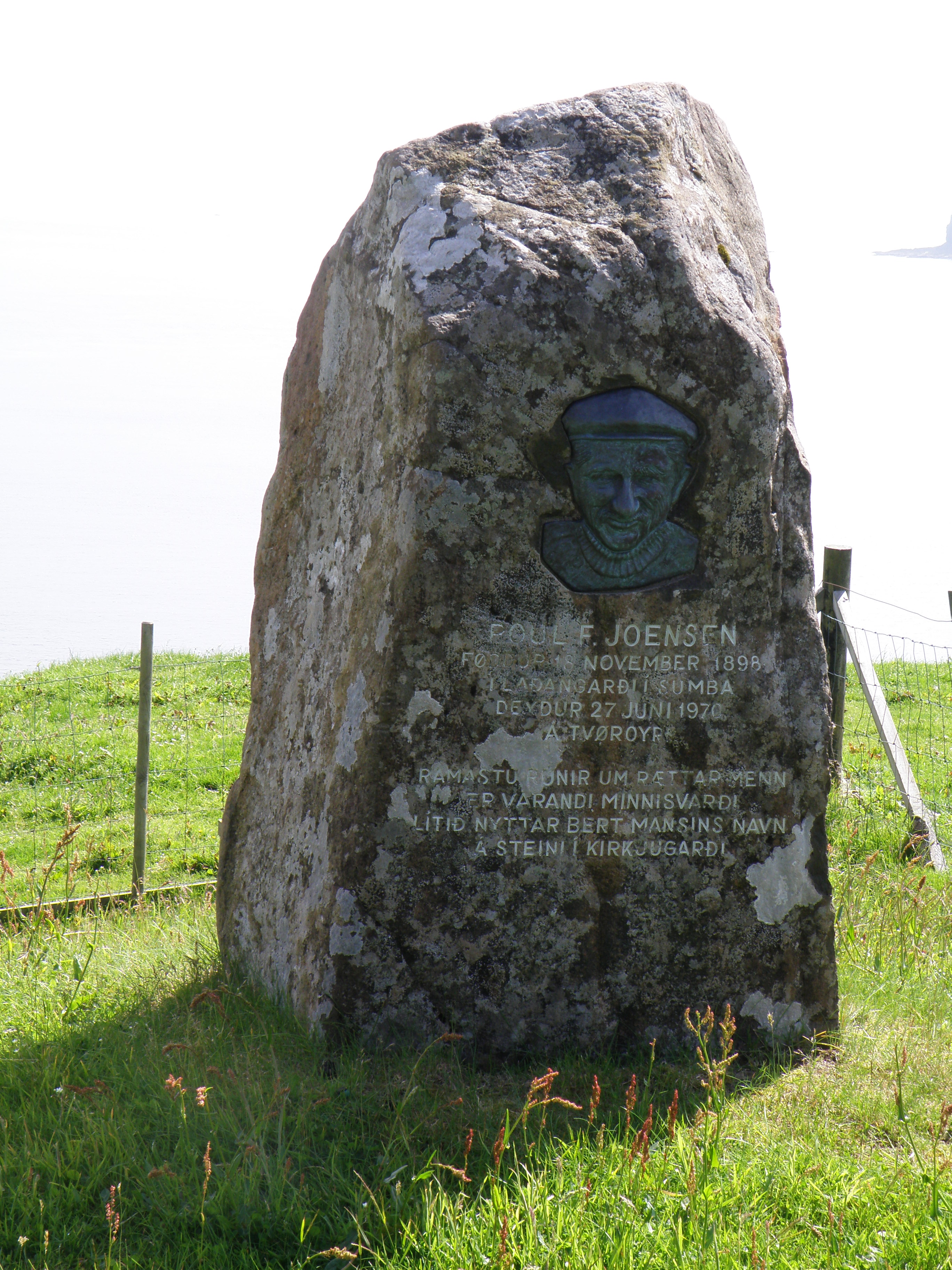
Memorial stone in Froðba in memory of Poul F. Joensen

- 1963 – Faroese Literature Prize (M.A. Jacobsens Heiðursløn).

== Memorial stone ==
On 17 June 2007 a memorial stone was erected in Froðba by Lions Club Suðuroy, near his home. The stone was taken from a hillside in Sumba, the village where he was born and grew up. A metal plate with a portrait of Poul F. Joensen was placed on the stone, made by Nordisk Metalkunst of Kalsing in Denmark. Árni Ziska made the text and put the plate into place. Trúgvi Gudmundarson made the stone base beneath the memorial stone.

== Literature ==
- Árni Dahl, Bókmentasøga 2, from page 104; Fannir, 1981
