= Á fold eru túsund gudar =

Studio album by Hanus G. Johansen
- Released: 18 November 2012
- Recorded: 2012
- Genre: Pop rock; folk
- Label: KISA
- Producer: Mikael Blak

Hanus G. Johansen chronology
Hørpuspælarin (2010)	Á fold eru túsund gudar (2012)

Á fold eru túsund gudar is a studio album by the Faroese singer/songwriter Hanus G. Johansen. It is the third cycle of settings of poems by the Faroese poet Poul F. Joensen (1898-1970), following Gaman og álvara (1988/2008) and Hørpuspælarin (2010). The album Á fold eru túsund gudar was released on 18 November 2012, which was the birthday of Poul F. Joensen. Hanus G. Johansen has composed all eleven songs and also sings them. Poul F. Joensen (1898-1970) has written 8 of the poems and translated 3 of the poems to Faroese. The album was produced by Mikael Blak, mixed by Jónas Bloch and Theodor Kapnas, recorded in Studio Bloch in January and February 2012. Mastering by Lehnert Kjeldsen.

== Track list ==
1. Bergtikin 4:49 - Poem by Poul F. Joensen - Composed: Hanus G. Johansen (Bewitched)
2. Trúnaðardungin 3:26 - Poem by Poul F. Joensen - Composed: Hanus G. Johansen (The Mound of Faith)
3. Slanguhalin 2:43 - Poem by Daumer, translated by Poul F. Joensen - Composed: Hanus G. Johansen (The Snake's Tail)
4. Ein sorgarsøga 7:29 - Poem by Poul F. Joensen - Composed: Hanus G. Johansen (A Sad Tale)
5. Á fold eru túsund gudar 2:14 - Poem by Poul F. Joensen - Composed: Hanus G. Johansen (On earth there are a thousand gods)
6. Til hina einastu 2:51 - Poem by Poul F. Joensen - Composed: Hanus G. Johansen (For the one and only)
7. Mín Stela ... Eg kann ei ... 3:08 - Poem by Poul F. Joensen - Composed: Hanus G. Johansen (My Stella... I can not...)
8. Í iva 3:52 - Poem by Gustaf Frøding, translated by Poul F. Joensen - Composed: Hanus G. Johansen (In Doubt)
9. Jens Jógvansson 2:15 - Poem by Robert Burns, translated by Poul F. Joensen - Composed: Hanus G. Johansen (John Anderson)
10. Til mína 4:41 - Poem by Poul F. Joensen - Composed: Hanus G. Johansen (To mine)
11. Gloym meg ikki 3:33 - Poem by Poul F. Joensen - Composed: Hanus G. Johansen (Don't forget me)

== Musicians ==
- Hanus G. Johansen: vocals, acoustic guitar
- Magnus Johannesen: piano, harmonium, memotron, wurlitzer, juno, organ, prepared piano
- Mikael Blak: double bass, electric bass, minimoog, theremin, autoharp, whistling
- Benjamin Petersen: acoustic guitar, electric guitar, banjo, mandolin
- Derek Murphy: drums, percussion
