= Brent Mason =

American musician (born 1959)

- Born: July 13, 1959 (age 66); Van Wert, Ohio, U.S.
- Genres: Country
- Occupations: Guitarist, songwriter
- Instruments: Guitar, six-string bass
- Years active: 1986–present

Brent Mason (born July 13, 1959) is an American country music guitarist, songwriter and session musician.

Guitar World magazine listed Mason as one of the "Top Ten Session Guitarists of All Time". Discovered and mentored by Chet Atkins, Mason has been named "Guitarist of the Year" 12 times by the Academy of Country Music and was inducted into the Musicians Hall of Fame and Museum in 2019. In addition to releasing two instrumental studio albums, he holds several credits as a songwriter.

He is a Grammy Award winner (2008) and a two-time winner of the CMA Award Musician of the Year. A line of "Brent Mason" guitar models has been marketed by two different guitar manufacturers. The "Stories Collection Brent Mason Telecaster" was launched August 11, 2020.

== Biography ==
Brent Mason was born on July 13, 1959, in Van Wert, Ohio. At the age of five years, he taught himself to play guitar by ear. After graduating from high school, he moved to Nashville to pursue a career in country music. Early Nashville gigs included a stint with the Don Kelly Band, a cover band who performed at a Murfreesboro Road Honky-tonk, The Stagecoach Lounge.

Mason was eventually discovered by guitarist Chet Atkins, who invited him to play on his Stay Tuned album. From there, Mason has gone on to play on well over a thousand albums, including those of George Strait, Alan Jackson, Shania Twain, John Michael Montgomery, David Gates, Brooks & Dunn, Zac Brown Band, Scotty McCreary, Blake Shelton, Holly Dunn, Dude Mowrey, Ronna Reeves, Turner Nichols, Prescott-Brown, Randy Travis, Michelle Wright, Victoria Shaw, Martina McBride, Tim McGraw, Paul Brandt, Matt King, the Kinleys, Tracy Byrd, Trisha Yearwood, Chris Young, Hal Ketchum, Alabama, Reba McEntire, Jessica Andrews, Willie Nelson, Steve Wariner and Neil Diamond. Mason also co-wrote McBride & the Ride's "Hurry Sundown".

Mason signed to Mercury Records in 1997, releasing an instrumental album entitled Hot Wired the same year. This was his only major-label album. He made a decision to leave Mercury Records soon after to remain in Nashville and work in the recording studio as a session guitarist rather than spend most of his time on the road touring and away from his family. He and his brother Randy released a second album, entitled Smokin' Section, in 2006. At the 51st Grammy Awards, he and several other guitarists won the Grammy Award for Best Country Instrumental, for the track "Cluster Pluck" from Brad Paisley's mostly-instrumental album Play.

Although Brent works mainly as a studio musician, he has produced several albums to date for artists including Erin James, Tommy Dalton, Cindy Kvinlaug, and Evi Tausen and co-produced an album with Byron Gallimore for Clay Walker. In November 2013, Mason collaborated with online education site JamPlay.com to put together a series of guitar lessons for aspiring guitarists and members of JamPlay.

== Other contributions ==
From 2003 to 2010, Valley Arts Guitar joined with Brent to create and manufacture the Valley Arts Brent Mason Signature Model Guitar, which was based on the Fender Telecaster design. In 2013, PRS Guitars launched the Brent Mason Signature Model Guitar. Wampler Pedals manufactures and sells the signature Brent Mason "Hot Wired" guitar effects pedal, currently on version 2. Mason authored an instructional course entitled "GuitarStar: Brent Mason Country" published by PG music in Victoria BC.

Mason was named one of the Top Ten Session Guitarists of All Time in Guitar World magazine. In the July 2016 issue of Taste of Country magazine, he was named one of the top guitarists in country music.

In 2020, Mason became an endorsed Fender artist with a production-line signature Fender Telecaster and a Limited Edition Fender Custom Shop Heavy Relic version handbuilt by Master Builder Kyle McMillin.

== Awards ==
- Country Music Association (CMA) Musician of the Year – 1997 and 1998.
- Nashville Music Awards – Guitarist of the Year – 1995.
- Academy of Country Music – Guitarist of the Year – 1993, 1994, 1995, 1996, 1997, 1998, 1999, 2000, 2001, 2004, 2006 and 2009.
- MusicRow Session Guitarist of the Year 1994, 1995, 1996, 1997, 1999, 2000, 2001, 2003, 2004 and 2010.
- National Thumbpickers Hall of Fame, 2011.
- Music City Allstars Award (the musician who has played on the most top-10 songs on the radio for the entire year.)
