= The Ghost (Faroese band) =

The Ghost is a Faroese electropop duo consisting of Filip Mortensen on vocals and Urbanus Olsen on electronics.

Following their appearance at the Iceland Airwaves music festival, held in Reykjavík, Iceland, the duo received a recording contract with the British Sunday Best record label. The duo also appeared at the G! Festival, held in Syðrugøta, Faroe Islands, in 2009 and 2010. In addition, they have performed as the warm-up band for The Wombats, a British indie-rock band; Ladytron, an English electronic band; and Vampire Weekend, an American indie-rock band.

In 2010, they released their debut album War Kids.

== See also ==
- Lists of musicians
- List of synthpop artists
- Music of the Faroe Islands
