= Guðrið Hansdóttir =

Faroese musician

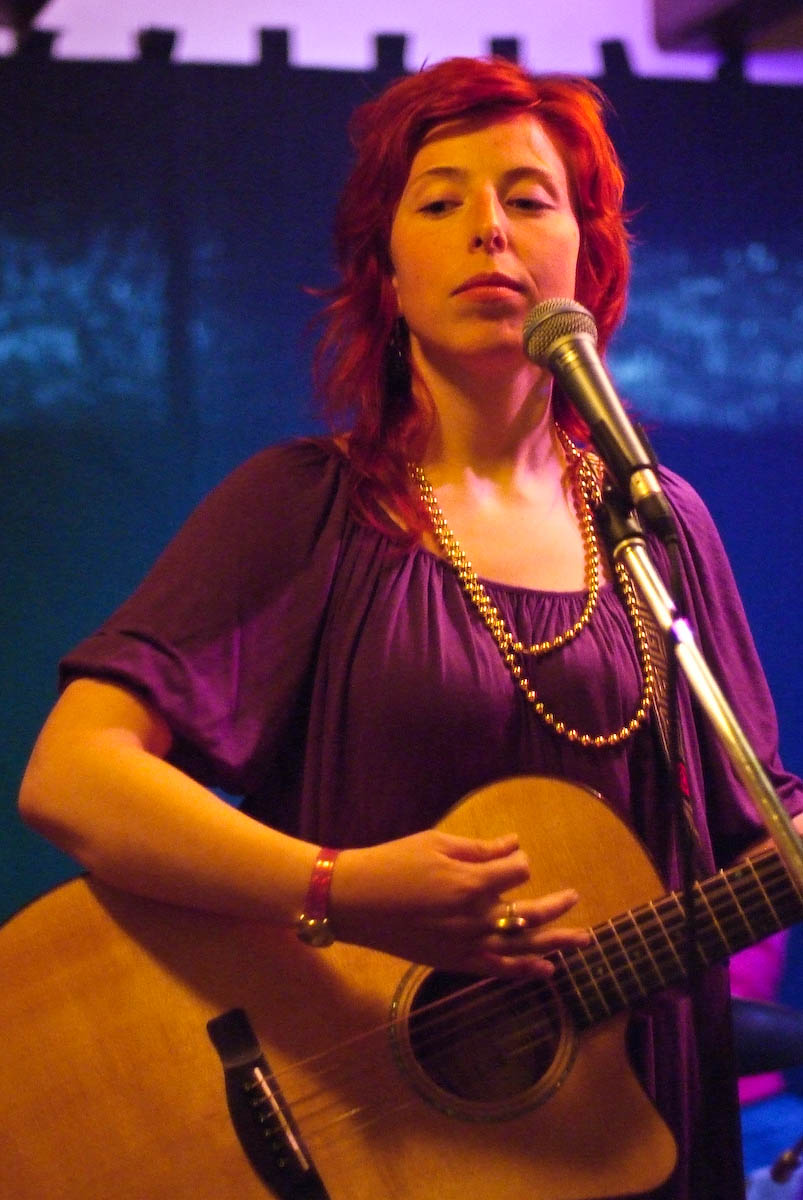
- Guðrið Hansdóttir (2008)

Background information
- Born: 6 October 1980 (age 46); Faroe Islands
- Origin: Faroese
- Genres: Pop, folk, electropop
- Occupations: Singer, songwriter, composer, musician
- Instruments: Vocals, guitar, recorder, clarinet
- Years active: 2004-present
- Labels: Tutl, Nordic Notes

Guðrið Hansdóttir (born 6 October 1980) is a Faroese singer, songwriter, composer, and musician. She has released six full studio albums and has released an EP called "Taking Ship" on 24 January 2014 in the United States, in February in Europe. Taking Ship has seven songs which are poems by Heinrich Heine in English translation, except for one of Heine's poems which is in Faroese translation by Poul F. Joensen, Tú hevur tær dýrastu perlur. On the 22nd of April 2022 she released the album Gult myrkur which is a collaboration with Faroese poet Lív Maria Róadóttir Jæger.

== Biography ==
Guðrið Hansdóttir grew up in Argir near Tórshavn, and is the daughter of Louisa and Hans Carl Hansen. Her father is a well-known guitar player in the Faroe Islands, having earlier played with the Faroese bands Straight Ahead and Streingjasúpan. Guðrið's last name was Hansen, which is a Danish form commonly used in the Faroe Islands, but later she changed it to the Faroese form Hansdóttir (which means daughter of Hans). When Guðrið was 14 years old, her father taught her to play the guitar, and ever since then she has been creating her own songs. Later she became a popular singer/songwriter in the Faroe Islands. She has won the Faroese music award called Planet Awards two times. In 2007, she was awarded as the Best Female Singer and in 2009 her album The Sky is Opening was awarded as the Best Album of 2009 (best Faroese album). After her third album Beyond the Grey which was released in June 2011 she moved to Reykjavík, Iceland, where she concentrated fully on her music. She performed in various places in Iceland and also toured in Europe and USA. In the Faroes she has several times performed on music festivals like Summarfestivalurin in Klaksvík and the G! Festival in Syðrugøta. She has also played at big international festivals like SXSW in Austin, SPOT in Aarhus and Iceland Airwaves In Reykjavík. She finds inspiration in all, from Swedish pop music to 70s rock like Jethro Tull and 80s icon Kate Bush.

=== Byrta ===
Byrta
- Origin: Iceland
- Genre: Electropop
- Years active: 2012-present
- Members: Guðrið Hansdóttir; Janus Rasmussen

In 2012 while living in Reykjavík, she met another Faroese musician, Janus Rasmussen who had for some years now been a member of the Icelandic/Faroese electro band Bloodgroup. The two found out that they had something in common, and started to play music together.

Before she met Janus, Guðrið wrote some new songs, this time in Faroese, instead of in English. She and Janus worked with these new songs for some months and planned to make a new album. She wrote the lyrics and composed the songs; Janus played all the instruments and later he produced the album. The album self-titled BYRTA was released in May 2013. The new duo was called Byrta and their music was electropop.

== Discography ==
=== Albums ===
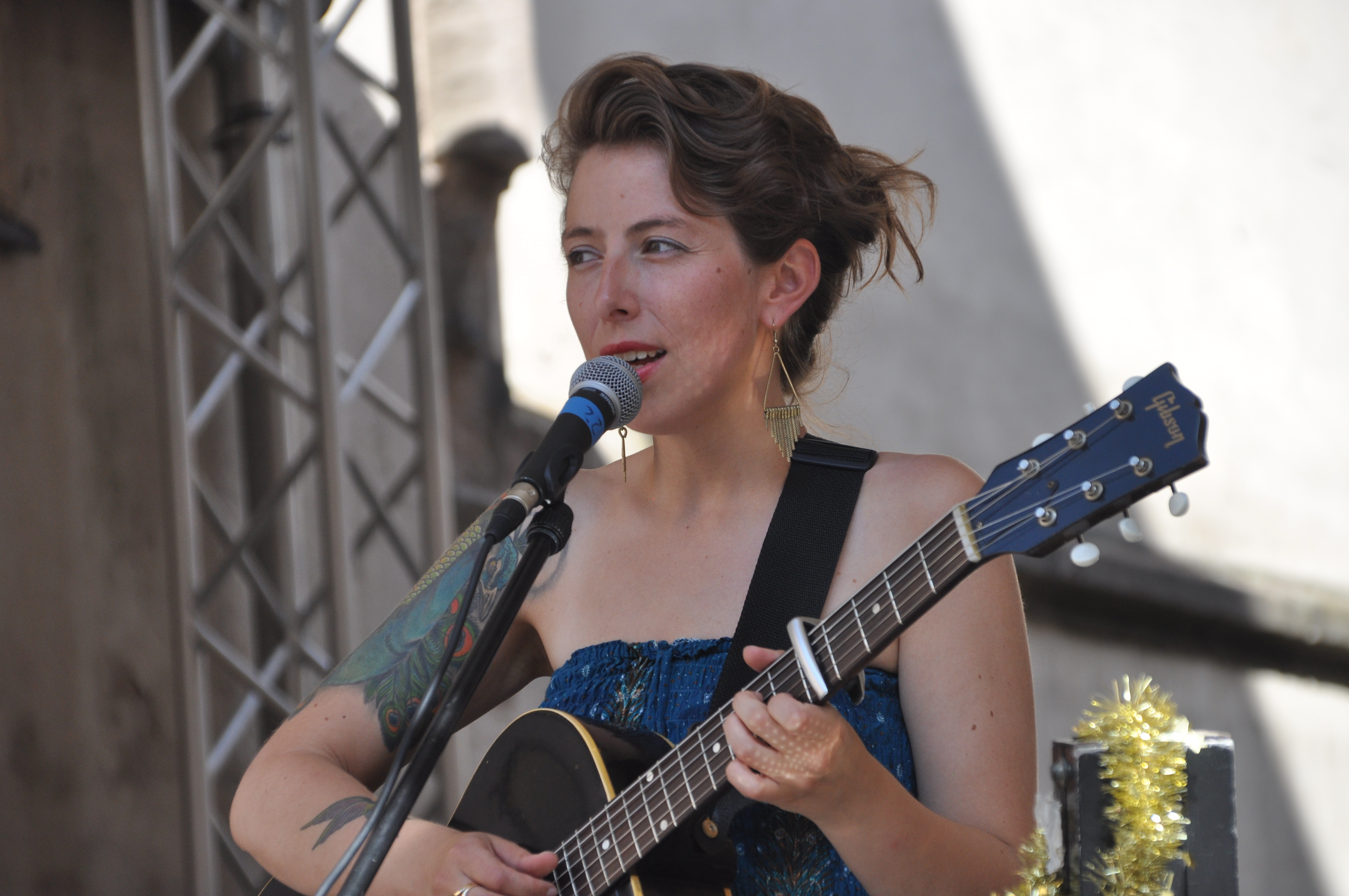
Guðrið Hansdóttir performing at the music festival "Bardentreffen" 2013 in Nuremberg

Solo albums

- Love is Dead, Tutl, 2007.
- The Sky is Opening, 2009.
- Beyond the Grey, 2011
- Taking Ship, 2014.
- Painted Fire, 2016.
- Gult myrkur, 2022.
- Sýrublað, 2026

With Byrta

- BYRTA, Tutl, 2013

== Prizes and nominations ==
- Planet Awards 2005 nominated as Best female singer
- Planet Awards 2006 nominated as Best female singer
- Planet Awards 2007 Best female singer (won)
- Planet Awards 2009 Album of the Year (won)
- Planet Awards 2010 nominated as Best female singer
- Planet Awards 2011 nominated as Best female singer
- Planet Awards 2011 nominated as Artist of the Year'
- Planet Awards 2011 nominated as Album of the Year' (Beyond the Grey)

Faroese Music Awards 2014 nominated as Album of the Year (BYRTA) (Won) Faroese Music Awards 2014 nominated as artist of the Year (BYRTA) ( Won) Faroese Music Awards 2014 nominated as best new act ( BYRTA) (Won)

- Pan-Arcticvision 2023 prize for The song that gives the most feeling of Community and Togetherness 2023
