= Ingolf Olsen =

Norwegian footballer (1907-1938)

Personal information
- Date of birth: 10 November 1907
- Date of death: 27 October 1938 (aged 30)

International career
Years	Team	Apps	(Gls)
1931	Norway	1	(0)

Ingolf "Peik" Olsen (10 November 1907 – 27 October 1938) was a Norwegian footballer. He played in one match for the Norway national football team in 1931.
