= Mpiri =

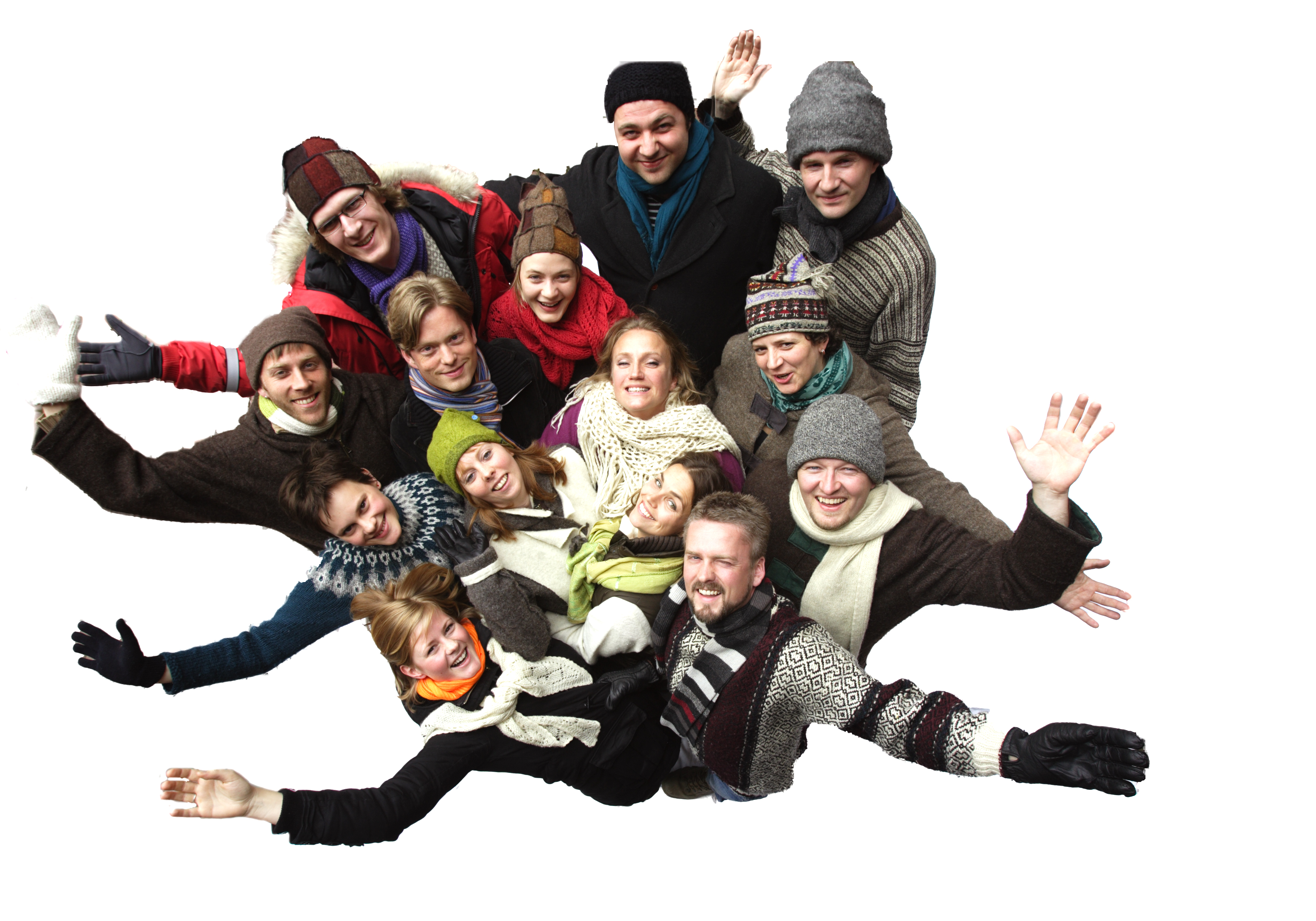
- Group photo from the recording of Upp Gleðist

Background information
- Origin: Faroe Islands (January 1998)
- Genres: Choir, Classical
- Label: Tutl
- Website: Mpiri, Facebook

The vocal ensemble Mpiri is a Faroese choral ensemble based in Copenhagen. The members are mostly Faroese studying or working in Copenhagen. The conductor is Gorm Larsen.

== History ==
Mpiri was formed in January 1998 by Marjun Hoydal, Bogi Peturson Nielsen, Bogi Mouritsen and Tróndur Bogason. The idea was conceived in December 1997, and within a month, 16 young Faroese got together and formally formed Mpiri. Mpiri has had three conductors: Bogi Mouritsen (1998–2000), Sunleif Rasmussen (2000–2002) and Gorm Larsen (2003–present). Lise Christensen Bjerno was guest conductor in the spring semester of 2011.

== Style ==
From the very start, Mpiri has sought out new and inspiring music to perform. In this pursuit, Mpiri has commissioned more than 30 choral works from more than ten composers. This means that Mpiri through the years has performed much contemporary music. However, this is not the full story of the style of Mpiri. Mpiri has also performed works by Gesualdo, Thomas Tallis, Mozart, Hassler and many other classical composers. Given the roots of Mpiri, Faroese traditional music has a firm place in the repertoire.

== Projects and concerts ==
- A project where a number of non-faroese composers are commissioned to create choral music to contemporary faroese poetry, has been started. Recordings are scheduled to begin in the fall of 2012.
- Spring concerts in Jutland.

== Past projects and concerts ==
This is a select list of major projects and concerts

=== 2012 ===
- On 15 January, Mpiri sang at the celebration of HM Queen Margrethe 2nd of Denmark's 40th Jubilee as Reign

=== 2011 ===
- Opening Copenhagen Paint Party 2011 (part of Copenhagen Distortion)
- Backing Teitur at a Friday Rock concert in Tivoli
- Performing at the 10th anniversary concert for The Danish Quartet
- Christmas Concert with Greenlandic Folk singer Rasmus Lyberth at Graabrødre Klosterkirke, Odense

=== 2010 ===
- Mpiri had four concerts and one performance with Eivør. Two concerts in Sjónleikarhúsið, a performance at Saltsiloin, one concert at G! festival and one concert in Lille Vega in Copenhagen in the fall. All concerts were promotional for the CD Larva that Mpiri recorded with Eivør in 2009.
- Mpiri recorded with Teitur (only female singers)
- Mpiri recorded a CD with Knút Olsen choral works, in collaboration with Faroese-based choir Tarira in the spring. The CD Mai Mynd was released in the fall.
- Mpiri collaborated with the Faroese string quartet DORIA in three concerts

=== 2009 ===
- Mpiri did a tour of the Nordic countries in the fall, performing Barbara with Saga Dance Art Collective. The tour started late October with two performances in Hafnafjörður, Iceland, followed by two performances in the Faroe Islands (Løkshøll in Rúnavík and Nordic House in Tórshavn). The tour ended with a performance in the black diamond (Royal Library) in Copenhagen, Denmark on the 9 October which is the cultural night in Copenhagen.
- Mpiri recorded with the band Valravn in the spring. Review of the recording is available further down.
- In the fall Mpiri went to the studio with Eivør to help her record 8 songs for her upcoming CD.

=== 2008 ===
- Performed at kulturnatten (cultural night) in the Faroese house in Copenhagen.
- Participated at Expo 2008 the world's fair hosted in Zaragoza, Spain where he performed at the Danish Pavilion on the Danish national day - 2 July. The performance of Barbara - a famous novel by the Faroese author Jørgen-Frantz Jacobsen, as a modern ballet set to music by Tróndur Bogason was performed with dancers from Saga Dance Company.

=== 2007 ===
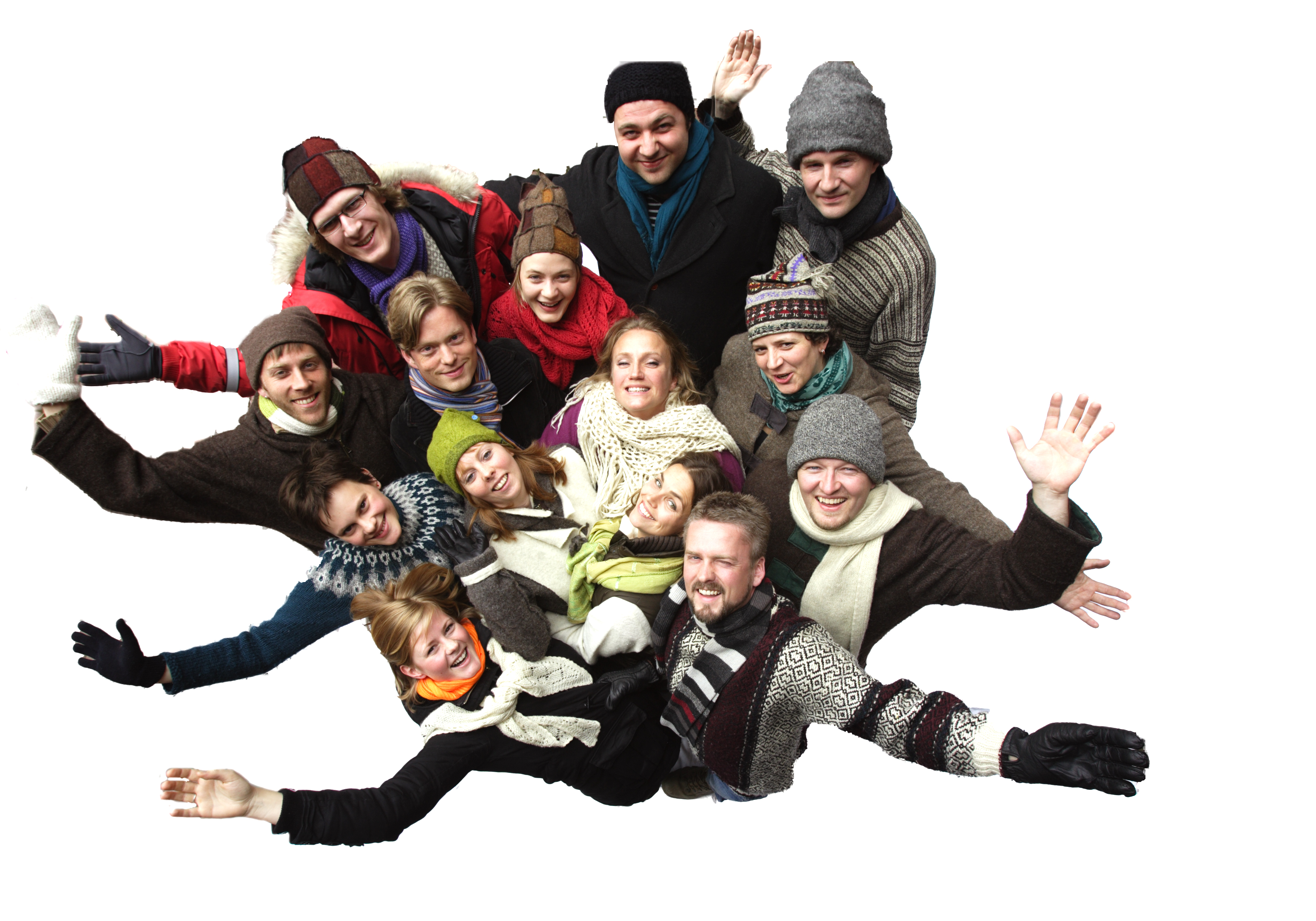
Group photo from the record Upp gleðist released in 2007

Most of 2007 was spent recording 12 commissioned and 3 older Christmas songs to make up the CD Upp Gleðist. The CD was released in late November to early December with a small tour to Thorshavn with concerts in The Nordic House and around the city.

=== 2006 ===
- Tour of the Faroe Islands

=== 2005 ===
- Concert in Round Tower, Copenhagen

=== 2004 ===
- Concert in sydslesvig
- Tour of Finland with concerts at the 80 year celebration of Pohjola in Turku, Sibbo and in Berghälls church in Helsinki.

=== 2003 ===
- Promoting the CD Asbest.
- Concert in Round Tower, Copenhagen

=== 2002 ===
- Tour of Faroe Islands, Sweden and Iceland. Performed three concerts in Iceland, one in Sweden and one in Faroe Islands.
- Faroese parliament 150 years. Mpiri performed at the galla event.
- Mpiri recorded the first CD Asbest

=== 2001 ===
- Opened the Arts Festival in the Faroe Islands with a concert in Húsavík, Faroe Islands
- Concert in Round Tower, Copenhagen.
- Participate in North Atlantic Choir Festival in Copenhagen.

=== 2000 ===
- In the spring Mpiri performed a concert called fisk (fish) in Huset i Rådhusstræde in Copenhagen. Mpiri collaborated with the Faroese designers PAU to make new outfits for Mpiri, and a Faroese lighting artist to make the settings right. Fisk was a big success.
- After participating in North Atlantic Choir Festival in Aalborg, Sunleif Rasmussen took over conducting Mpiri.

=== 1999 ===
- Mpiri arranged the North Atlantic Choir Festival in Gladsaxe. Approximately 140 singers from Faroe Islands, Iceland and Greenland participated.

=== 1998 ===
- The first ever concert was in the communal house, Galgebakken, Albertslund.
- The first year Mpiri had no real projects apart from participating in the North Atlantic Choir Festival in Odense. At the festival, Mpiri made its first 'first performance' with 'Stórhvalagildi' by Tróndur Bogason

== Discography ==
=== Solo Recordings ===
- Upp gleðist (rejoice) (2007)
- Asbest (2003)

=== Featured on ===
- Mai-mynd (2010) Tarira and Mpiri singing Knút Olsen
- Larva Eivør (2010)
- Koder på snor Valravn (2009)
  - please read the review further down on this page. Review in Danish.
- Flóðir av ljósi (floods of light) choral works of Kári Bæk (2005)

== See also ==
- Music in the Faroe Islands.
