= Yggdrasil (band) =

Nordic band based in the Faroe Islands

Yggdrasil is a Nordic music ensemble based in the Faroe Islands. The band was formed in 1981 by the composer and pianist Kristian Blak, who has written most of the material for the group. From the very beginning, Yggdrasil has included musicians from other countries, having varied musical backgrounds, mainly in jazz, but also in ethnic, folk, rock and classical music.

Most of their works have been created in relation with other forms of art: visual art, poetry, ballet, opera - or in some cases, with nature (concertos in sea caves). The compositions draw ideas and themes from ethnic material from the North Atlantic region, such as Faroese ballads, hymns and rhymes, Inuit songs or Shetland folk music. Improvisation takes a large part in the interpretation and ranges from free and ethno-jazz to classical and world music.

The band is named after the world tree Yggdrasil in Norse mythology.

== Band members ==
Past and current members include

- Anders Hagberg, flute and saxophone
- Anders Jormin, bass
- Angelika Niesen, violin
- Brandur Jacobsen, drums
- Eivør Pálsdóttir, vocals
- Ernst Dalsgard, flute
- Heðin Ziska Davidsen, guitar
- John Tchicai, saxophone
- Kári Sverisson, vocals
- Karin Korpelainen - drums
- Kristian Blak, piano
- Lelle Kullgren, guitar
- Mia Káradóttir, flute
- Mikael Blak, bass
- Ólavur Øster, guitar
- Rasmus Lyberth, vocal
- Tore Brunborg, saxophone
- Villu Veski, saxophone

== Discography ==
- Den Yderste Ø (HJF 12, Tutl 1981) - poems by William Heinesen
- Ravnating (HJF 13, Tutl 1982) - dia show by Philippe Carré
- Heygar og Dreygar - folk belief of the Faroe Islands, paper collages from William Heinesen /
  The Four Towers ballet based on the poem "Barnetegning" by William Heinesen (HJF 15/19, Tutl 1985)
- Concerto Grotto - with Faroese nature as a musical partner /
  Drangar - music written to the "sculpture" in Faroese nature (HJF 33, Tutl 1984 / 1993)
- Brøytingar (HJF 21, Tutl 1988) - concept and artworks by Ole Wich
- Yggdrasil (HJF 88, Tutl 2002) - featuring Eivør Pálsdóttir
- Live in Rudolstadt (HJF 99, Tutl 2004) - featuring Eivør Pálsdóttir (live recording from the 2003 TFF Rudolstadt)
- The Tübingen Concert (2 DVD, HJF 122DVD, Tutl 2005) - live recording at the University Hospital Tübingen (Germany)
- Risastova (HJF 111, Tutl 2006 ) - featuring Kári Sverrisson, as well as the suite "Vágatunnilin" (Tunnel Music)
- Askur (2 CD, HJF 133, Tutl 2007) - live recordings 1982-2006
- Grót & Vatn (HJF 233, Tutl 2012) - live recording at The Nordic House Tórshavn (Faroe Islands)
