= Faroese Teachers' Association =

Trade union for educators in the Faroe Islands

- Føroya Lærarafelag
- Abbreviation: FTA
- Established: 1898; 128 years ago
- Type: Trade union
- Location: Faroe Islands
- Field: Education
- Subsidiaries: Faroese Teachers' Association Publishing Company (Bókadeild Føroya Lærarafelags)
- Website: www.lararafelag.fo

The Faroese Teachers' Association (Faroese: Føroya Lærarafelag) is a trade union for educators in the Faroe Islands. The association was established in 1898, and its press, Bókadeild Føroya Lærarafelags (Faroese Teachers' Association Publishing Company), was established in 1956.

== Chairpersons ==
- Jacob Eli S. Olsen 2019–
- Herálvur Jacobsen 2010–2019
- Páll Poulsen 2010 (acting)
- Magnus Tausen 2003–2010
- Elsa Birgitta Petersen 1999–2003
- Andras L. Samuelsen 1997–1999
- Jenny Lydersen 1997
- Esmar Berg 1992–1997
- Inga Høgenni 1988–1992
- Trygvi Teirin 1984–1988
- Marita Petersen 1980–1984
- Eilif Samuelsen 1969–1980
- Hans Kristiansen 1968–1969

| class="col-break col-break-2" |

- Johannes A. Næs 1964–1968
- Ludvig Petersen 1963–1964
- Johannes A. Næs 1960–1963
- Poul E. Petersen 1954–1960
- Marius Johannesen 1942–1954
- Rikard Long 1934–1942
- Mikkjal á Ryggi 1930–1934
- Peter Mohr Dam 1927–1930
- Símun Pauli úr Konoy 1915–1927
- Poul Jensen 1902–1915
- Louis Bergh 1898–1902
