= Brandur Enni =

Faroese musician (born 1989)

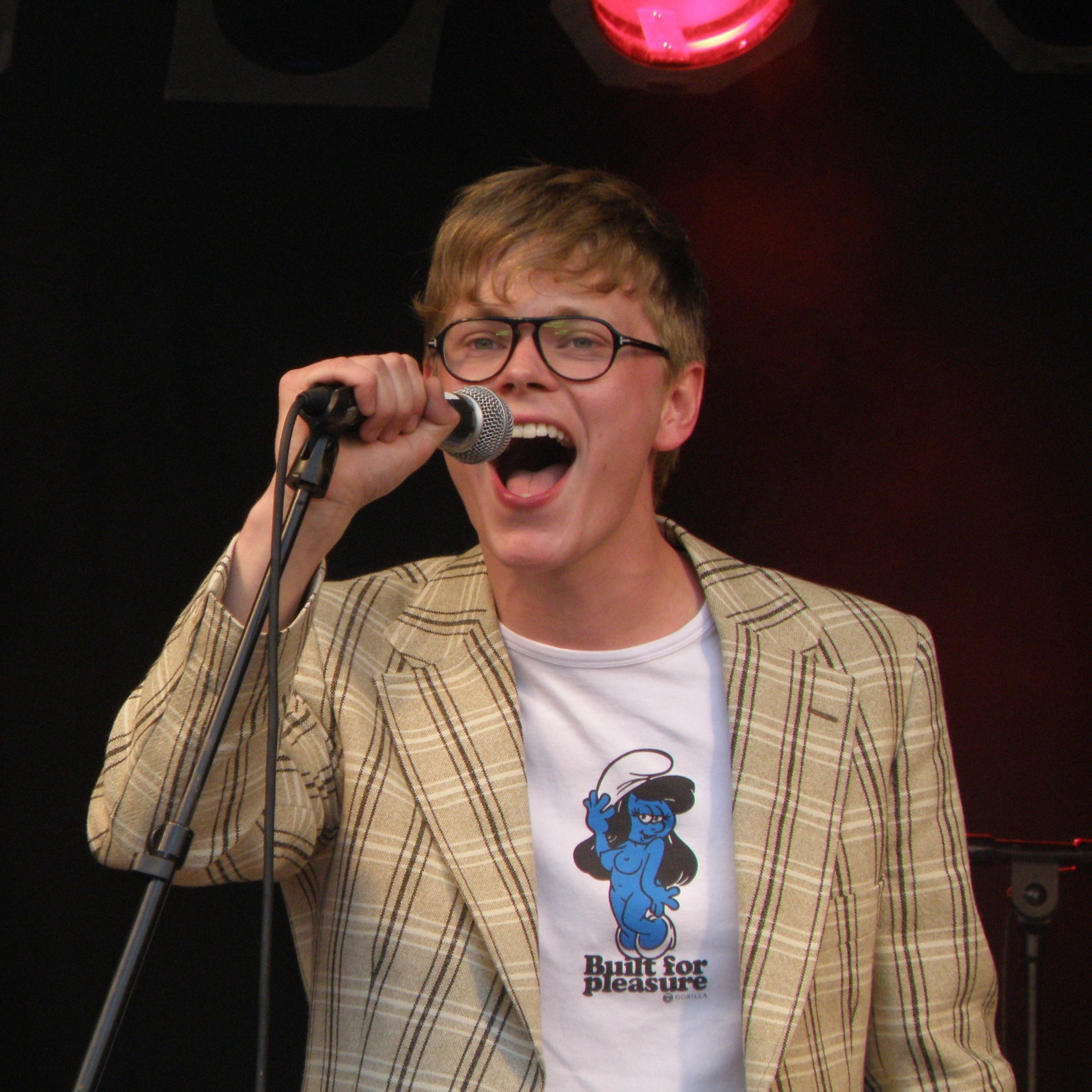
- Brandur Enni (2009)

Background information
- Born: Brandur Helgason Enni; 15 April 1989 (age 37)
- Origin: Tvøroyri, Faroe Islands
- Genres: Pop, Soul, Rock
- Occupation: Singer
- Years active: 1998–present
- Website: http://www.brandur.com/

Brandur Helgason Enni (born 15 April 1989), is a Faroese singer, songwriter, composer, and musician. He plays guitar, trumpet, piano and flugelhorn. In August 2006, he moved to Sweden, where he studied music for two years at the Music Production Academy "Musikmakarna". In 2012, he moved back to his hometown Tvøroyri and started to attend the Suduroy High School. Brandur's brother Tróndur Enni is also a singer and songwriter and plays several instruments; he is well known in the Faroe Islands and sometimes performs with Frændur singer Eyðun Nolsøe. At the Midsummer Festival in Tvøroyri, the two brothers Brandur and Tróndur performed together on stage along with other Faroese musicians.

== Career ==
Brandur Enni's musical career started early; he was singing on two albums in 1998 and 2000. He released his debut album Waiting in the Moonlight in 2002, when he was 12 years old. Enni gained popularity in the Faroe Islands, Denmark and in Iceland, and later he became a well known name in Sweden and other countries, especially after participating in the Melodifestival 2008 in Sweden, which is held every year to find the best candidate for the Eurovision Song Contest. Enni sang a ballad called "Lullaby"; he became number 7 at the semi-final and did not make it to the final round. It was Charlotte Perrelli who won the Swedish contest and represented Sweden in the Eurovision Song Contest 2008 in Belgrade in Serbia. Perrelli became number 18 with her song "Hero".

Enni has performed at several of the summer festivals in the Faroe Islands: The Summer Festival (Summarfestivalurin) in Klaksvík, The Asfalt Music Festival in Tórshavn and the Midsummer Festival in Suðuroy (Jóansøkufestival).

Enni has co-written with Swedish songwriters Julia Ericsson, Aleena Gibson, Karin Elisabeth Dreijer, Lasse Andersson, Benny Andersson, Anna Allerstedt, Maria Marcus and Evelina Satell.

In December 2007, Enni signed a publishing deal with Air Chrysalis Scandinavia. On 19 October 2009, he was the support act for Alexander Rybak, who won the Eurovision Song Contest 2009.

Enni also worked with the record producer Timbaland, who runs a private studio in Virginia Beach, United States.

In 2009 Enni sang the Swedish version of the theme song in Disney's High School Musical 3, "Right Here, Right Now" with the Swedish singer Molly Sandén. The Swedish title of the song is "Just här, just nu". In 2009, Enni released a single, "Sometimes Truth Needs a Lie". It was produced by Lionheart International, which is one of the biggest record companies in Sweden (established in 1990), now a part of Universal Music family.

In 2011, he released the single "The Illusion Of".

== Awards and nominations ==
Every year in December, the Faroese newspaper Sosialurin and the newsportal Portal.fo give Planet Awards to Faroese musicians in these categories: "Best Faroese Band or Artist", "Best album", "Best Female Singer", "Best Male Singer", "Best New Band or Artist" and "Best Song".

Enni won the Planet Award 2009 in the category "Best Male Singer".

- Planet Awards 2009 – Best male singer
- Nominated Planet Awards 2009 in the category Best song with Sometimes truth needs a lie
- Nominated Planet Awards 2010 – Best male singer

== Discography ==
- Waiting in the Moonlight, debut album, 2002
- The Way I Am, documentary, 2002
- Perfect Summer, single, 2002
- Still Friends, single, 2003
- Brandur, single, 2003
- Brandur, album, 2003
- Lullaby, single, 2008
- Lifelong Lovesong, single, 2008
- Sometimes Truth Needs a Lie, single, 2009
- The Illusion Of, single, 2011
- Funerals and Celebrations album, Tutl, 2014

== Appeared on ==
- Mánadags Mortan, (The title means Monday's Mortan, children are singing), 1998
- Kular Røtur, "Music for Children", 2000
- Dýrd, various artists, 2005 (Words For You)
- Jól í dag – Christmas Album, various artists, 2007
