= Evi Tausen =

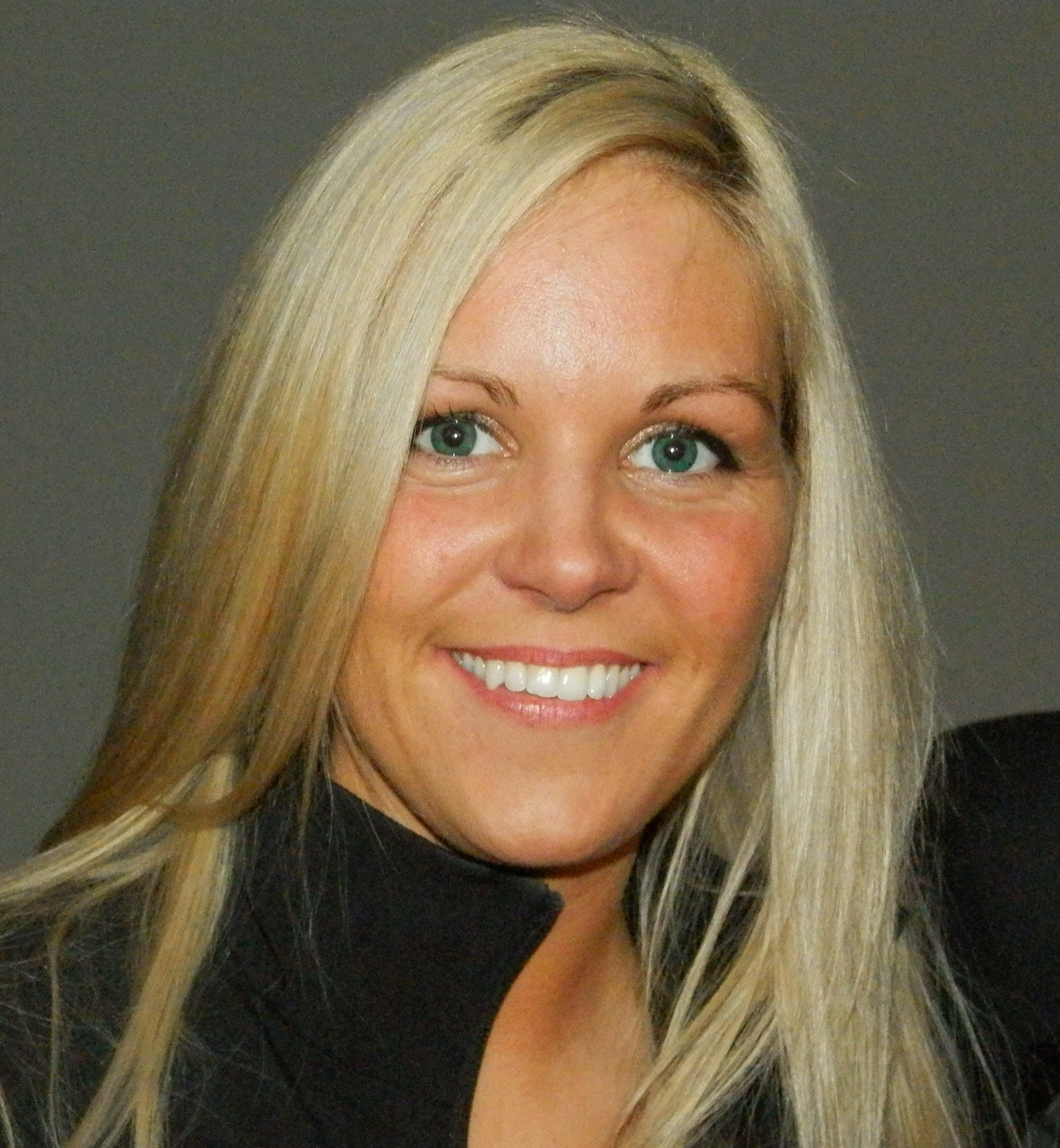
- Evi Tausen, 2013

Background information
- Also known as: Evi
- Born: Evi Tommysdóttir Tausen; 1981 (age 44–45)
- Origin: Froðba, Faroe Islands
- Genres: Country music
- Occupation: Singer
- Instrument: Guitar
- Website: Official website

Evi Tommysdóttir Tausen (born 1981) is a Faroese country singer. She grew up in Froðba, Faroe Islands, and Kastrup, Denmark. Both of her parents are Faroese.

== Musical career ==
Evi Tausen started her musical career in 2010 when she released a single with two songs by Jim Reeves: "How's the world treating you" and "He´ll have to go". The recordings were made in Kris-Stuff Studio in Hoyvík, by Jákup Zachariasen. Some of the Faroese musicians were Pætur við Keldu and Heiðrun Petersen, Pætur við Keldu also sings backing voice on one of the songs. In November 2011 Evi released an album (CD) with the title: "Evi - Wishing Well". The CD was recorded in Nashville i co-operation with several American songwriters, i.e. Brent Mason, who also produced the album. Mason has won an CMA-Award in the category "Musician of the Year" twice, he has also won Academy of Country Music Guitarist of the Year Award 12 times.

Evi was a new name in Faroese music, when she released her first single in 2010. The first time she sang for an audience was at her own wedding in August 2010, when she sang for her husband. The next morning he gave her a guitar as a morning gift. Evi has performed at festivals and concerts in the Faroe Islands, i.e. Summarfestivalurin and at the Country Festival in Sørvágur in 2012.

In January 2013, the song "Oh, How I Miss You Tonight" which Evi sings together with Jim Ed Brown, was number five on the Pan-European TOP-100 Radio Chart, which is the country-hitlist of European Country Music Association (ECMA). In February 2013 Evi went on a tour in Europe, she performed in Germany and Scotland together with the Faroese musician Jens Marni Hansen and Pauli Magnussen. In Germany she had the opportunity to perform together with German and American female singers: Alina Duwe and Kayleigh Leith. They also visited Ireland.

In February she was nominated as International Artist of the Year by Irish Country Sound. She was invited to perform at the Irish Country Sound Entertainment Awards on 4 March 2013. One of her songs which was just released in Ireland was Blue Radio. She won the Irish award as International Artist of the Year.

Later in March Evi Tausen performed at the Scottish Caithness Country Music Festival in Thurso. Musicians who played together with Evi Tausen were: Jens Marni Hansen, Pauli Magnusen, Brandur Jacobsen, Bjarni Lisberg and Hallur Djurhuus.

== Albums ==
- 2015 - Make Life A Dance, CD
- 2011 - Evi - Wishing Well, CD
- 2010 - How's the world treating you, single with two songs (includes the song He´ll have to go).

== Awards and nominations ==
- 2013 - International Artist of the Year by Irish Country Sound (won)
- 2012 - Nominated Planet Award (Faroese music award) in the category Best female singer (did not win)
- 2012 - Best International Country Artist by ICMA Awards Fan Voting (won). She was also nominated in the category "Country Vocal Event of the Year" together with Jim Ed Brown for the song "Oh How I Miss You Tonight". Their song ended as number two. (ICMA is now known as ICoMA, short for Independent Country Music Association.
- 2012 - Artist of the Month on the website keepitcountryradioshow.co.uk/ in February 2012.
