= MC-Hár =

Rap-band from the Faroe Islands

- Origin: Tórshavn, Faroe Islands
- Genres: Rock, Rap
- Years active: 1991–present
- Members: Tróndur Bogason; Niels Uni Dam; Rani Hammershaimb Christiansen; Heri Reynheim; Jónas Bloch Danielsen; Rókur Jákupsson; Jens Virgar Jakobsen
- Past members: Allan Mortensen; Stamen Stanchev; Eyðun Ásason; Magnus Johannesen; Fríði Øster; Terji Rasmussen; Niels Arge Galán; Uni Árting; Torkil Olsen; Petur Dalsgaard; Jan Guttesen; Gunnar Restorff; Tummas av Reyni; Mark Jiminez; Eddie Joensen Næs; Johannes Danielsen; Emil Hermansen; Malan Eyðunsdóttir

MC-Hár (Hár means Hair in Faroese) is a rap-band from the Faroe Islands. They were the first Faroese rap-band and the first band to sing rap in Faroese. Since the first time MC-Hár went on stage in February 1991, the band has made its mark on the Faroese rock scene. From being an underground act with a small but faithful following, the band in the late nineties emerged as one of the biggest acts in the Faroe Islands.

== History ==
MC-Hár was established in February 1991 in Torshavn by rappers Niels Uni Dam and Allan Mortensen. They were quite active and part of the vibrant music scene in the Faroe Islands in the early 90s. They played a radio concert in January 1992, which is the first actual recording of the band. They also played Tungmálmur 92 and Tungmálmur 93, the first two heavy metal concerts held in the Faroe Islands. MC-Hár also featured on the annual Ólavsøkukonsert in 1992. After a couple of years as an emerging act in Tórshavn, the members moved to Copenhagen at the time in order to study. They rehearsed in the basement of the Øresundskollegiet, a student residence where many young Faroese students live while studying in Copenhagen. They played at concerts especially in summertime in Tórshavn and other places in the Faroe Islands when they were home on holidays, i.e. at the Ólavsøka Concert which was popular then, before the musical festivals started. They released their first album: Framvegis uttan vit in 1998, and the maxi CD Burn me the following year. Apart from these albums the band has released songs on several compilations and live albums.

The band is still active from time to another, i.e. they played on Ólavsøka in 2006, 2009 2012 and in 2013, where they were called the legendary MC-Hár, on Norðoyastevna in Klaksvík in 2011, headlining the first ever G! Festival. They played at the Spot Festival in Aarhus in 1999 being one of the first Faroese bands to play there. In 2013 the band once again ventured abroad playing a gig in the legendary Loppen in Christiania

The band was founded by rappers Spark Buzz N (a.k.a. Niels Uni Dam) and MC-Allah (a.k.a. Allan Mortensen). Over the years they have been the frontmen of the band, while the line-ups have changed. MC-Allah left the band in 2003 just a week before the band were scheduled to play in the final of the big bi-annual Faroese band contest Prix Føroyar. The reason for leaving the band he founded was, that he didn't feel like it anymore.

Niels Uni Dam remains in the band, and singer Rókur Jákupsson Jakobsen, who joined the band in 2000, has taken a more central role, replacing MC-Allah as co-frontman with Niels Uni Dam. Rókur Jakobsen was voted Best Faroese Male Singer 2006 at the Planet Awards ceremony in January 2007 and Faroese singer songwriter of the year in 2005. He has a successful solo career, as well as in bands like Diatribes, Lokum, Tangz, All That Rain and currently also the vocal group Bollarnir.

Even though some changes have been in the line-up, some band members have stayed on over long periods, and have become integral parts of the band. Bassplayer Heri Reynheim first joined the band in 1996 and is still a member of the band. His solid rock bass is a major part of the MC-Hár sound. While playing in MC-Hár Heri has also played in other Faroese bands such as Life, Malan Eyðunsdóttir Band, Deja Vu and Fluffy Toys. Heri has released one album with the 70's rock band Eager To Please, where he was joined by current MC-Hár drummer Rani Hammershaimb Christiansen and Fate singer Dagfinn Joensen. Both Heri and Rani are also members of Viking hard rock band Hamradun, one of the most popular bands to hail from the Faroe Islands with three albumbs and extensive touring record behind them. Rani joined MC-Hár in the summer of 2002, only weeks before the band were booked to headline the first ever G!Festival. He teamed up with former Diatribes bandmates Heri Reynheim, Rókur Jakobsen and guitar player Jens Virgar Jakobsen. The guitar player joined MC-Hár in 2000, replacing Niels Arge Galán, who left MC-Hár to focus on his punk project 200.

Jens Virgar Jakobsen is still a member of the band, but is also known for his contributions in the Bluegrass and country act The Reverends and Danish rock act Mr. Conroy. Jónas Bloch Danielsen plays rhythm guitar. He joined the band in 1998, after being a stand-in engineer on the band's first studio album "Framvegis Uttan Vit". He Engineered, produced and mixed the follow-up EP Burn Me in 1999, and was for years Studio Owner at Studio Bloch in Tórshavn, after working with Faroese singer/songwriter Teitur for quite some years.

Tróndur Bogason plays keyboards and sings. He has been the main songwriter in the band, since he joined them in late 1991. Twice he has had breaks from the band, but rejoined in 2003. Bogason has studied music at the Royal Danish Academy of Music. In the period 1999-2005 he took The Masters programme in composition and in 2005-2007 he studied The Soloist programme in composition. Bogason has co-worked with the well known Faroese singer Eivør Pálsdóttir, and in 2012 they got married.

Niels Uni Dam had a weekly review of Faroese music in the national Faroese Radio (Kringvarp Føroya) in broadcasts called Kvørnin and Brunsj.

== Discography ==
- Framvegis Uttan Vit (1998)
- Burn Me (EP) (1999)

=== Additional appearances ===
- Rock í Føroyum (1995)
- Prix '99 (1999)
- Tutl 25 ár - Live 2002 (2002)
- Prix Krem (2003)
