= Jens Marni Hansen =

Faroese musician (born 1974)

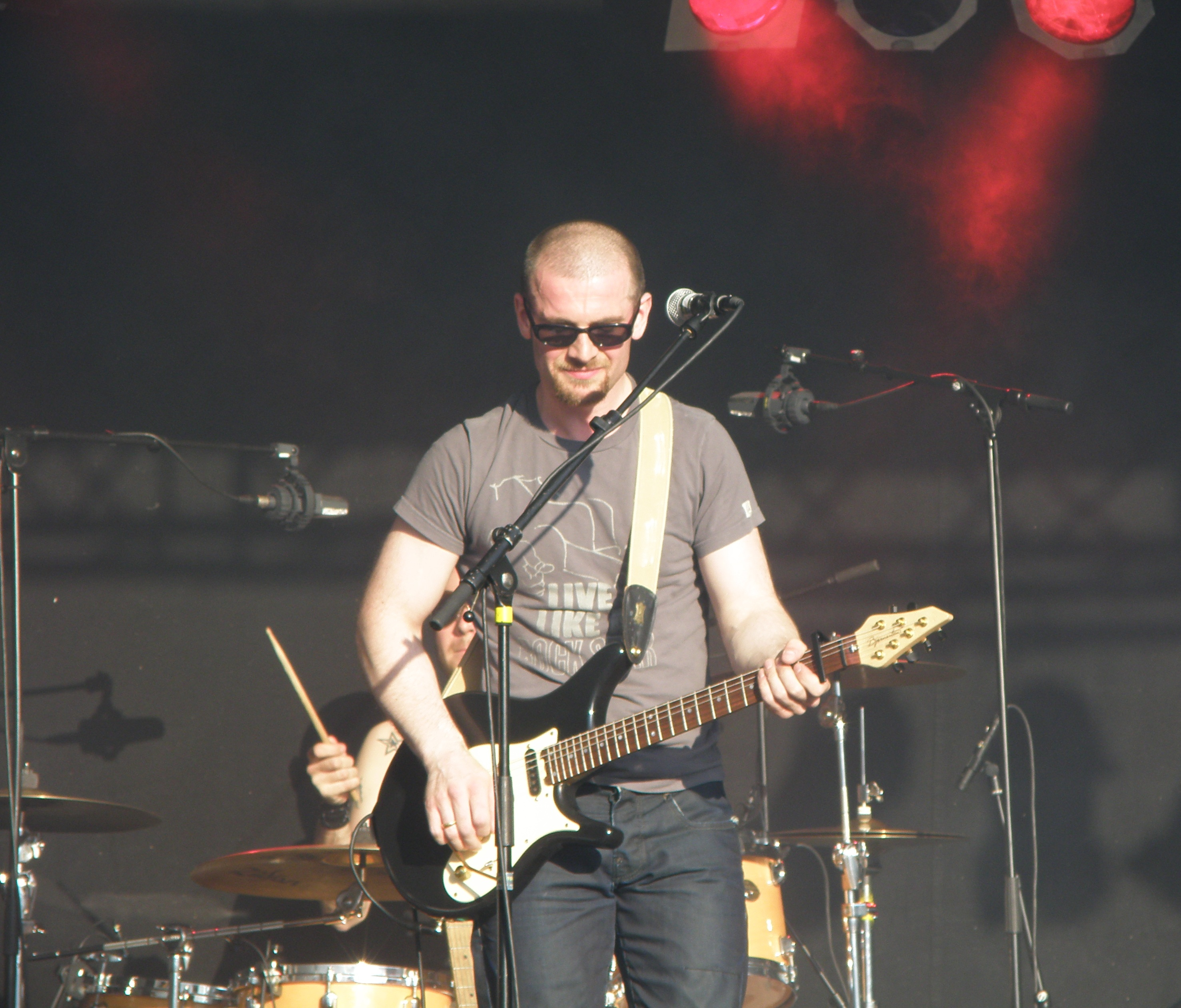
- Jens Marni at the Jóansøkufestival 2009

Background information
- Born: Jens Marni Hansen; 18 December 1974 (age 51); Kollafjørður, Faroe Islands
- Origin: Faroe Islands
- Genres: Rock, pop
- Occupation: Singer

Jens Marni Hansen (18 December 1974) is a Faroese singer, songwriter, composer, and musician. He grew up in and lives in Kollafjørður.

== Musical career ==
He has been active in Faroese music ever since he was very young, and he has been a member in multiple bands like All That Rain, Kjølar, and Showmenn. For the last several years he has been a solo musician and has been performing under his own name. In 2008, he published his first solo album called The Right Way, and later that same year he was awarded the title of the best male Faroese singer of 2008, and he received a Faroese music award, the Planet Award. His album also received an award for being the CD of the year on the Faroe Islands. In February 2010, Hansen made a name for himself in Denmark when he entered the Dansk Melodi Grand Prix.

=== Dansk Melodi Grand Prix 2010 ===
Jens Marni Hansen was one of the 10 artists who participated in Dansk Melodi Grand Prix. He performed the Rock song "Gloria" written by Sven Gudiksen, Johannes Jørgensen, and Noah Halby. Four artists continued to the finale, but Jens Marni Hansen was not one of the finalists. The winner was Chanée and N'evergreen who performed the song "In a Moment Like This". Jens Marni Hansen later told Sosialurin that he was informed by DR that the DR viewers had voted him as the winner, that they voted by text message and he got the most votes overall, although he did not win because the judges did not think that his song was the best one. One of the judges even voted Hansen as number one. The voting from the judges weighed 50 percent of the decision, and the votes from the text messaging weighed equally 50 percent of the final decision.

=== Performs with Evi Tausen ===
In 2013, Jens Marni Hansen went on a tour in Europe with Faroese country singer Evi Tausen. He plays guitar and sings backing voice in their band. They have performed in Germany, Scotland and Ireland.

== Discography ==
In June 2008, Jens Marni Hansen released his first solo album. In March 2013 he released his second.

=== Solo releases ===
- Anywhere you wanna go (2013)
- The Right Way (2008)

=== All That Rain ===
- The Naked Truth (2001)

=== Other appearances ===
- Lort í Býin (2007)
- Prix Føroyar 2001 (2001)
