= Hanus G. Johansen =

Faroese singer and composer

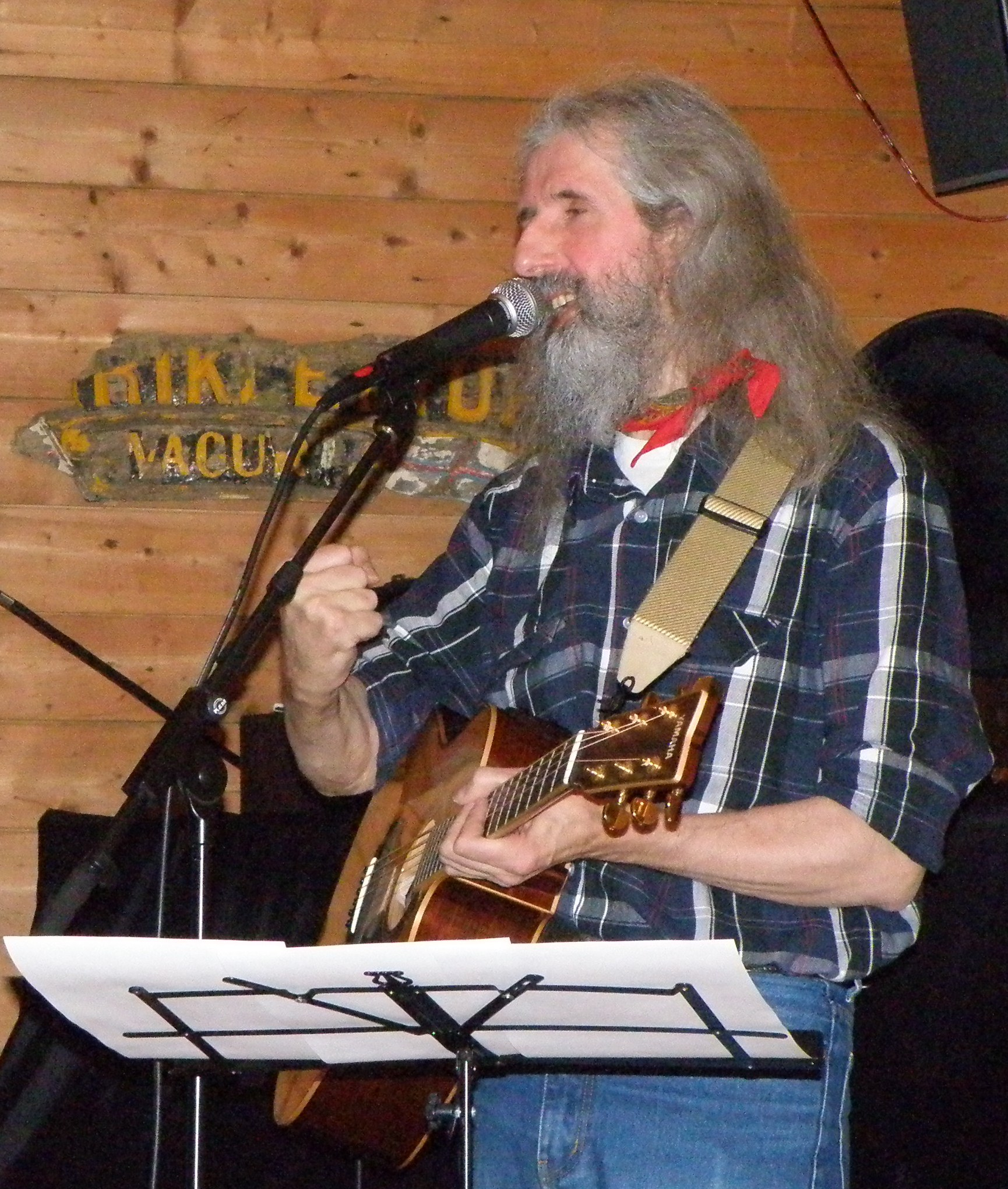
Hanus G. Johansen, 2010.

Hanus Gjærdum Johansen (18 June 1950 - 11 October 2025), also known as Hanus G., was a Faroese singer and composer. He was born in Klaksvík and was well known in his country as a concert and festivalperformer. Many of his songs have become evergreens and are popular even among the young people. He has composed melodies for some of Poul F. Joensen's poems, first time was in 1988, when he released his album Gaman og álvara; Poul F. (1898-1970) wrote poems about the Faroese society, about love and other themes as well. In November 2012, he released a new album with poems by Poul F. Joensen, Á fold eru 1000 gudar (which means On earth are only 1000 Gods), he composed all the melodies. In 2006, Hanus G. released an album with poems by the Norwegian poet Jakob Sande (1906-1967), who is a well known poet in Norway. Hanus G. has performed together with the Faroese ensemble Aldubáran and with the Faroese band Frændur, but often he performed by himself with his guitar or with various musicians. Hanus G.'s music is mostly folk music, but because of its popularity it can also be defined as a kind of pop music.

== Albums ==
=== Albums by Hanus G. Johansen ===
- Á fold eru túsund gudar - Hanus syngur Poul F. - poems by Poul F. Joensen, music by Hanus G. Johansen. CD, released on 18 November 2012.
- Hørpuspælarin - Hanus syngur Poul F. - poems by Poul F. Joensen, music by Hanus G. Johansen. CD, released on 18 November 2010.
- Eitt blað eg á kann skriva - poems by Hans Jacob Glerfoss, music by Hanus G. Johansen. CD, released 18 June 2010, on Hanus G.'s 60th birthday at a concert in Norðurlandahúsið in Tórshavn.
- frå leddigen - Hanus G. Johansen & Aldubáran - poems by Norwegian Jakob Sande, music by Hanus G. Johansen. CD, released 1 December 2006, on Jakob Sande's 100 years anniversary.
- Bouquet - Hanus G. Johansen & Aldubáran - poems by Poul F. Joensen, Rikard Long, Hans A. Djurhuus, Bernhard Brim, Tummas N. Djurhuus, Sverri Djurhuus and Omar Khayyam, music composed by Hanus G. Johansen. CD, released 18 June 2000, on Hanus G.'s 50th year birthday.
- Gaman og Álvara - Hanus syngur Poul F. - poems by Poul F. Joensen, music by Hanus G. Johansen. LP and cassette, released 18 November 1988, on Poul F.'s 90 years anniversary. Later released as a CD in 2008.

=== Other albums that contains music by Hanus G. Johansen ===
- Eivør Live - Eivør Pálsdóttir - Saknur - poem by Poul F. Joensen, music by Hanus G. Johansen.
- Eivør Pálsdóttir - Eivør Pálsdóttir - Áh, kundi á tíðarhavi - poem by Poul F. Joensen, music by Hanus G. Johansen.
- Soleiðis saman - Jógvan Andrias Joensen - Alt vendi móti tær and Á Omars slóð - poems by Jógvan Andrias Joensen, music by Hanus G. Johansen.
- Kærleikans Vallaraheim - Millum Frændur - Málningur yrkjarans - poem by Steintór Rasmussen, music by Hanus G. Johansen.
- Millum Frændur - Millum Frændur - Karin and Arbeiðskvinnan - poems by Steintór Rasmussen, music by Hanus G. Johansen.
- Ung um aldarmóti - various bands. - Átjan - poem by Tummas N. Djurhuus, music by Hanus G. Johansen.

=== Other albums where Hanus G. Johansen participate ===
- Frændur II - Frændur
- Saman við tær - Frændur
- Syng bara við - Kristian Blak & children. At first released in 1985 as an LP, later released as a CD.
- Nósi - with Kristian Blak (For children)

Springs, CD, 1989

== Awards and nominations ==
- 2013 - Listavirðisløn Nólsoyar Páls DKK 75 000, award from Klaksvík Municipality, established in 2013.
- 2013 - Sømdargáva landsins (a Faroese cultural prize of DKK 20.000 which will be given annually for the rest of his life)
- Nominated Planet Awards 2012 in the category Artist of the year
- Nominated Planet Awards 2010 in the category Best album with his album Hørpuspælarin (poems by Poul F. Joensen, the melodies are composed by Hanus G. Johansen)
- Nominated Planet Awards 2010 in the category Artist of the year
- 2008 - Listavirðisløn Miðlahúsins DKK 50 000, Art Award of The Faroese Media House
