= Kristian Blak =

Faroese composer

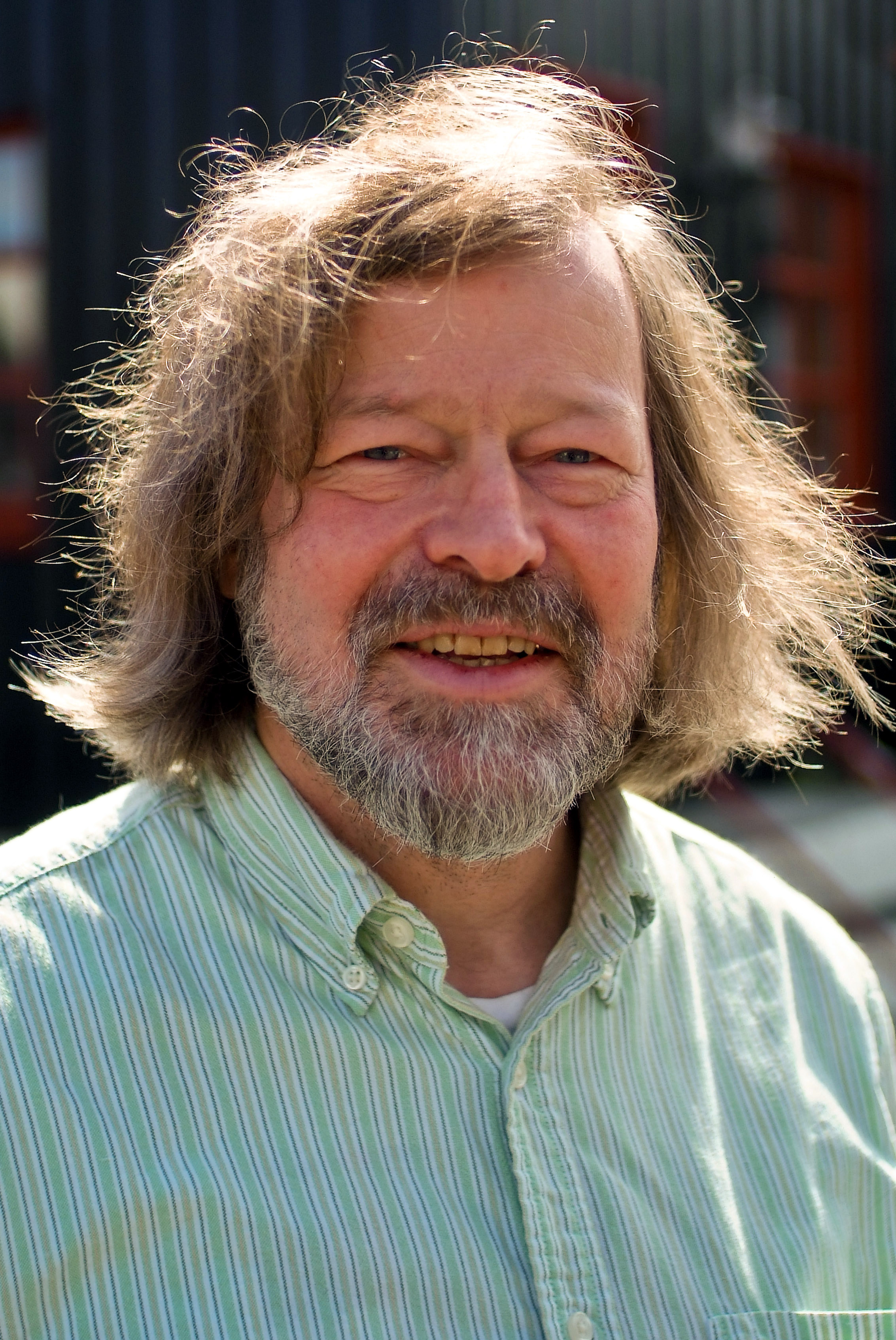
Kristian Blak

Kristian Blak (born 1947) is a Danish composer, musician, and record executive based in the Faroe Islands.

== Early life ==
Kristian Blak was born in Jutland, Denmark, in 1947.

He moved to the Faroe Islands in 1974, where he has written most of his musical works.

== Career ==
Blak is the founder of the Nordic musical ensemble Yggdrasil (named after the world tree known as Yggdrasil). He has worked with sounds from Faroese nature in several compositions. These include concerts in caves and other natural "concert halls" in the Faroe Islands. He has composed solo instrumental works, chamber music, choral works and symphonic music, for example the ballad Harra Pætur og Elinborg.

In 2010 Queen Margrethe of Denmark visited the Faroe Islands, and one of the events she visited was a grotto concert in Klæmintsgjógv (Gorge of Klæmint) by Blak and other musicians. The cave is 50 m (160 ft) high, and the sea in the cave is around 400 m (1,300 ft) deep. There are some places inside the cave where the musicians can stand with their instruments and give a concert to the audience in boats.

Blak is the chief executive officer of Tutl, which is the leading record label in the Faroe Islands.

== Recognition and awards ==
- 2002:Faroese Literature Prize, for his work with music in the Faroe Islands
- 2011 Heiðursgáva Landsins (Prize of Honour from the Faroese Ministry of Culture) – DKK 75 000

== Musical works ==
- 2001 PINIARTUT with Tellu Virkkala, Rasmus Lyberth and Ville Kangas
- 1999 24 PRÉLUDES
- 1998 KLÆMINT
- 1997 SHALDER GEO
- 1991 RAVNATING
- 1990 FIRRA
- 1989 ADDEQ
- 1988 ANTIFONALE
- 1987 FJAND with Svend Bjerg
- 1984 KINGOLØG
- 1983 SJÓMANSRÍMUR
- 1979 SNJÓUGLAN

== Albums ==
=== Solo albums ===
- 2005 Úr Holminum, 8 tracks, Tutl
- 2005 Snjóuglan, 10 Tracks, Tutl
- 1999 Klæmint Tutl
- 1992 Harra Pætur og Elinborg
- 1991 Ravnating, 8 tracks, Tutl

=== Yggdrasil ===
- 2004 LIVE AT RUDOLSTADT
- 2002 YGGDRASIL
- 1984/1995/2000 CONCERTO GROTTO & DRANGAR
- 1988 BRØYTINGAR Koncept: Ole Wich
- 1983/85 THE FOUR TOWERS & HEYGAR OG DREYGAR
- 1982 RAVNATING
- 1981 DEN YDERSTE Ø

=== Spælimenninir ===
- 2003 Malargrót
- 1996 Flóð Og Fjøra
- 1986 Hinvegin
- 1984 Rekaviður
- 1980 Burturav

=== Spælimenninir í Hoydølum ===
Spælimenninir í Hoydølum is the name of a former musical ensemble, they took name after a place name in Tórshavn called Hoydalar, the High School is located there.

- 1984 Á ferð
- 1987 Umaftur
- 1977 Spælimenninir í Hoydølum

=== Music for children ===
- 2003 Sóljudansir
- 1997 Øll hava veingir
- 1985 Syng bara við
- 1983 Nósi
- 1977 Nu ska' vi u å sejle við Kræklingum og øðrum.

== Honour ==
- 2024 - Best Initiative Prize for arranging the music festival Summartónar of over 1600 concerts over the last 30 years.
- 2020 - Special award at the Faroese Music Awards

== See also ==
- Music of the Faroe Islands
