= Elin Brimheim Heinesen =

Faroese journalist (born 1958)

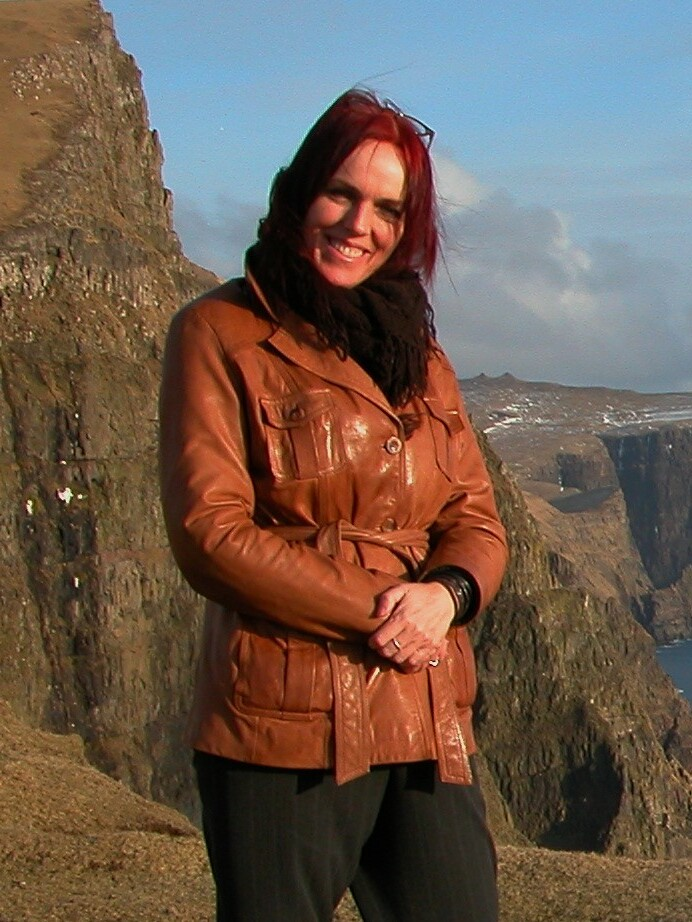
- Heinesen in 2008
- Born: 25 June 1958 (age 68); Tórshavn, Faroe Islands

Elin Brimheim Heinesen (born 25 June 1958) is a Faroese journalist, editor, singer, songwriter and composer. She is a Master of Arts in Art History (Aesthetics & Culture), studied at Aarhus University 1984-1986 and 1989-1991. After living in Denmark for over 20 years, she moved back to the Faroe Islands in 2007, where she became Director of Samvit, a public institution under the Faroese governance, which was responsible for tourism and export of Faroese goods, she was the director of Samvit until the council was closed in 2009. While living in Denmark, she worked as director, project manager, editor, and self-employed with her own company. From September 2009 to May 2012 she was employed as media and development manager at Kringvarp Føroya (Faroe Islands Radio and TV). Since May 2012 she was self-employed, and for a while she was a journalist at the portal portal.fo after being sold to Knassar. She also participates actively in the community debate on the Faroe Islands and was an active debater in connection with Sea Shepherd's Action Against Whaling, Operation GrindStop 2014. In February 2014 she was elected to the board of the new Faroese film association Føroysk Filmsfólk.

Heinesen is also known as a singer. In the 1970s and 1980s she was a member of various jazz bands, including performed in the jazz club Perlan in Tórshavn, which was demolished in 1983. In 1988, she released a cassette tape, Nalja-Elin & Kári, together with Kári Jacobsen. Several of the songs were hit in the Faroe Islands, including the song Sjeikurin, written by Heinesen, and the song about Ólavsøka, Á, tann deiliga Havn, which Kári Jacobsen has written and is still being played for Olaj.

== Family ==
Heinesen's parents were both authors, her father was Jens Pauli Heinesen, her mother was Maud Heinesen, born Brimheim (died 2005), She has a daughter, Helena Heinesen Rebensdorff (formerly known under the artist name Franka, now with the artist name Brimheim), who is a singer and songwriter as well.

== Discography ==
- 2023 - Eitt dýpi av dýrari tíð / A Chasm of Precious Time - Symphonic music by Elin Brimheim Heinesen, lyrics by Jens Pauli Heinesen, arrangement by Enzo De Rosa & Søren Hyldgaard, Orchestras: Czech National Symphony Orchestra, City of Prague Philharmonic Orchestra, Choirs: Tarira, Tórshavnar Manaskór (6 tracks in Faroese, same 6 tracks in English)
- 2018 - Handan stjørnurnar - Elin Brimheim Heinesen (12 tracks by Elin Brimheim Heinesen)
- 2010 - Yndisløg - Ein ferð aftur í farnar tíðir (Treasured songs - A Trip Down Memory Lane) - Together with Ad Libitum
- 1988 - Nalja - Elin & Kári (published as cassette tape in 1988 and as a CD in 1998) - together with Kári Jacobsen

== Honour ==
- 2022 - Faroese Music Awards in the category Song Lyric of the Year for "Sóleyan"
