= Rikard Long =

Faroese teacher, writer, and politician

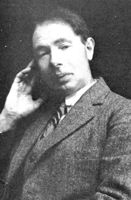
- Born: January 23, 1889; Tórshavn, Faroe Islands
- Died: December 16, 1977 (aged 88); Tórshavn, Faroe Islands
- Occupation: Writer
- Political party: People's Party (Faroe Islands)

Rikard Sigmund Long (January 23, 1889 – December 16, 1977) was a Faroese teacher, writer, and politician for the People's Party.

Long was born in Tórshavn, the son of Georg Long from Copenhagen and Svanhilda Pálsson from Vágur. He passed his examen artium in 1907 and his examen philosophicum in 1909. He enrolled at the University of Copenhagen in 1909, initially studying medicine and later switching to languages, but he never took any exams. He was a teacher at the Tórshavn Nautical School (Faroese: Tórshavnar skiparaskúli) from 1914 to 1916 and from 1919 to 1920, and then taught at the Faroese Middle and High School (Faroese: Føroya Millum- og Realskúli) from 1921 to 1954.

He headed the Copenhagen Student Union from 1916 to 1918, the Tórshavn Theater Society from 1928 to 1930, the Faroese Youth Association (Faroese: Føroya Ungmannafelag) from 1932 to 1943, and the Faroese Teachers' Association from 1933 to 1942. He served as a board member of Varðin press from 1919 to 1950 and headed it from 1935 to 1950. Lang served in the Faroese Parliament as a representative from the South Streymoy (Faroese: Suðurstreymoy) district from 1943 to 1958, and he was also a member of Kristian Djurhuus's first administration (1950–1954).

Long was one of the best-known Faroese literary critics, and he was awarded the Faroese Literature Prize for fiction in 1976. He died in Tórshavn.

== Selected works ==
- 1939: Færøerne, Danmark, Grønland (The Faroes, Denmark, Greenland)
- 1964: Fornnorrøn Lesibók I–II (Old Norse Reader I–II)
- 1979: Kveikt og kannað
