= Silicon Peach =

Silicon Peach is a term used to refer to Atlanta and the concentration of high tech development in the area. The term is a continuation of the reference following Silicon Valley (California), Silicon Alley (New York), Silicon Prairie (Chicago), Silicon Hills (Austin), and Silicon Beach (Los Angeles). Atlanta has long been a high tech center. Some of the traditional engines of technology development in Atlanta have been the ATDC at the Georgia Institute of Technology and the Technology Association of Georgia (TAG). New centers of innovation and technology acceleration are emerging, including the recent launch of the Atlanta Tech Village; the Ponce City Market; Tech Square Labs; and the Flatiron Accelerator.

Atlanta is one of the fastest growing high-tech urban centers in the United States, with a particular focus on:

- Mobility technology
- Digital media and content
- Network security
- Financial transactions processing
- Software development & engineering
- Health information technology
- Smart grid technology

According to a 2012 Jones Lang LeSalle report, Atlanta is the 10th largest technology city in the United States. The report went on to say that Atlanta tech companies generated $113 billion in revenue and nearly 30,000 new jobs. It is estimated that Atlanta companies will invest over $1 billion into new technology over the next five years.

== Economy ==
=== IT companies headquartered in greater Atlanta ===
- Agilysys
- AirWatch
- American Megatrends
- AppGriffin
- ArrayFire
- BitPay
- CoffeeCup Software
- DW Practice
- EarthLink
- Endgame
- Everspark
- First Data
- FIT Radio
- Ftrans
- IBM Internet Security Systems
- Intercontinental Exchange
- Kabbage
- Kaneva
- LabLynx
- MailChimp
- MFG.com
- NCR Corporation
- New Atlanta
- NewsRx
- Nexidia
- NexTraq
- Noble Systems Corporation
- Nuesoft
- Open-E, Inc.
- Oversight Systems
- PGi
- Pindrop Security
- PlayMotion
- Rent.com
- Revenue Analytics
- SalesLoft
- Scoutmob
- Sharecare
- ShrinkTheWeb
- Snapt Inc
- Systel
- The List
- The Weather Company
- Underneath.com
- YP Holdings

=== IT companies with offices in greater Atlanta ===
- Apple
- AlgoSec
- Amazon
- FIS
- Fiserv
- Google
- IBM
- LexisNexis
- Micro Focus
- Microsoft
- MuleSoft
- Northrop Grumman
- Oracle
- Sage
- salesforce.com
- SAP SE
- Square
- Symantec
- Travelport
- Twitter
- VMware
- Workday, Inc.
