= Corpay =

U.S. financial services company

Corpay, Inc.

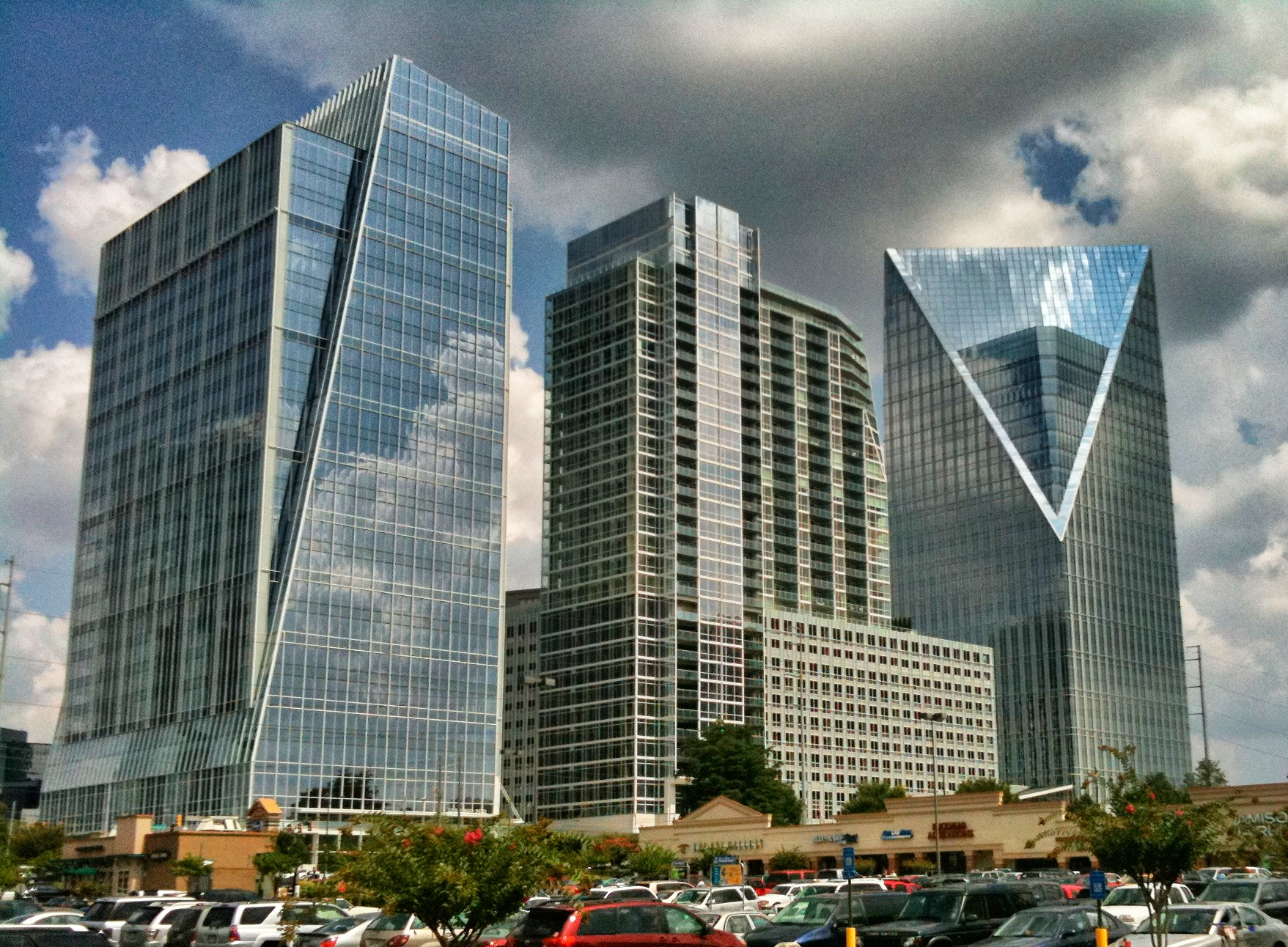
- The Terminus 100 Building, headquarters of Corpay in Atlanta, Georgia
- Type: Public
- Traded as: NYSE: CPAY; S&P 500
- Industry: Fintech
- Founded: 1986; 40 years ago
- Headquarters: Terminus 100; Atlanta, Georgia, U.S.
- Key people: Ronald F. Clarke (Chairman & CEO)
- Revenue: ▲US$3.97 billion (2024)
- Operating income: ▲US$1.79 billion (2024)
- Net income: ▲US$1.00 billion (2024)
- Total assets: ▲US$17.9 billion (2024)
- Total equity: ▼US$3.15 billion (2024)
- Owner: Ronald F. Clarke (4.58%)
- Number of employees: 11,200 (2024)
- Subsidiaries: Pacific Pride
- Website: corpay.com

Corpay, Inc. (formerly Fleetcor Technologies), headquartered in Atlanta, Georgia, provides payments and spend management systems and services that control expense-related purchasing and payment processes. The company focuses on vehicle-related expenses, lodging expenses, and corporate payments.

== History ==
Corpay's predecessor company was founded in 1986.

In August 2000, Ronald F. Clarke was named CEO; at that time, the company was a provider of fuel cards to businesses and its estimated annual revenues were $25 million.

In November 2019, the company moved its headquarters to Terminus 100.

In October 2023, due to the Russian invasion of Ukraine, the company sold its businesses in Russia for $197 million; it had been criticized for not selling the interests earlier.

In 2019, the Federal Trade Commission sued the company for obscuring fees and misleading consumers about fuel card discounts; in 2023 it received an injunction against the company preventing it from continuing the practice.

In March 2024, the company changed its name to Corpay.

=== Financing ===
In June 2002, Summit Partners invested $45 million in the company.

In July 2005, Bain Capital invested $75 million in the company.

In November 2006, Advent invested $46 million in the company.

In December 2010, Fleetcor became a public company via an initial public offering, raising $335 million.

=== Contract wins ===
#	Year	Company	Notes	Ref(s).
1	August 2004	Citgo		
2	2005	BP		
3	September 2007	Chevron Corporation	Lost the contract to WEX Inc. in 2016	
4	February 2011	Shell plc Europe/Asia	In partnership with Logical; €300 million	
5	July 2013	Husky Energy		
6	August 2016	Speedway		

=== Acquisitions ===
#	Year	Company	Price	Description	Ref(s).
1	September 2003	Commercial Fueling Network (CFN)			
2	October 2004	Mannatec			
3	September 2006	KeyFuels		Fuel-card operator in the United Kingdom	
4	October 2006	CCS		Fuel-card operator in the Czech Republic	
5	April 2007	Fambo UK Limited	$34.3 million	Fuel card company based in the United Kingdom	
6	March 2008	Abbey Fuelcards	$15 million	One of the leading fuel card resellers in the UK	
7	June 2008	ICP International Card Products B.V.	$5.9 million	Payment transaction processing company based in the Netherlands	
8	July 2008	Petrol Plus Region	$49 million	fuel card provider based in Russia	
9	April 2009	CLC Group (Corporate Lodging Consultants)	$169.1 million	Entered the lodging payments business	
10	August 2009	ReD (Retail Decisions) Fuel Cards	$62.9 million	Fleet card company based in the United Kingdom	
11	December 2011	AllStar Business Solutions	$304 million	Fuel card operator in the United Kingdom	
12	February 2012	Efectivale		Fuel and food payments services company in Mexico	
13	July 2012	CTF	$180 million	Fuel payment processing services provider in Brazil	
14	March 2013	GE Capital's Fuel Card Business in Australia			
15	April 2013	CardLink		Fuel card operator in New Zealand	
16	September 2013	VB Serviços and DB Trans	$300 million	Providers of transportation cards and vouchers in Brazil	
17	November 2013	Epyx		SaaS system and a network of vehicle repair garages serving fleet operators in the UK	
18	November 2013	NexTraq		US-based provider of telematics; sold in 2017 to Michelin	
19	May 2014	Fuel card customer portfolio of Shell plc in Germany			
20	May 2014	Pacific Pride	$50 million		
21	June 2014	Minority investment in Masternaut		European-based provider of telematics solutions	
22	November 2014	Comdata	$3.45 billion	Global provider of fuel cards and workforce payment products to businesses	
22	March 2016	Sem Parar	4.086 billion reais ($1.1 billion)	Largest electronic toll payments firm in Brazil	
23	August 2016	Travelcard		Universal fuel card issuer in the Netherlands	
24	August 2017	Cambridge Global Payments	$690 million	B2B international payments provider	
25	November 2017	Creative Lodging Solutions		Lodging provider to businesses	
26	November 2017	Minority investment in Qui! Group		Italian-based provider of food vouchers	
27	May 2018	Minority investment in P97 Networks		Provider of cloud-based mobile commerce and behavioral marketing products	
28	May 2019	Nvoicepay	$255 million	Automated invoicing services for more than 400 customers	
29	July 2019	SOLE Financial		Payroll card provider enabling instant wage access for workers	
30	October 2019	Travelliance		Airline lodging programs	
31	August 2022	Accrualify		Accounts payable software	
32	May 2024	Paymerang	$475 million	Accounts payable automation	
33	July 2025	Alpha Group International	$2.2 billion	British financial services business focused on FX risk management for corporate businesses	
