= Nicknames of Atlanta =

Slang terms for the city in Georgia, U.S.

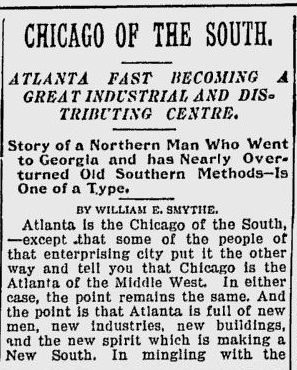
"Chicago of the South"

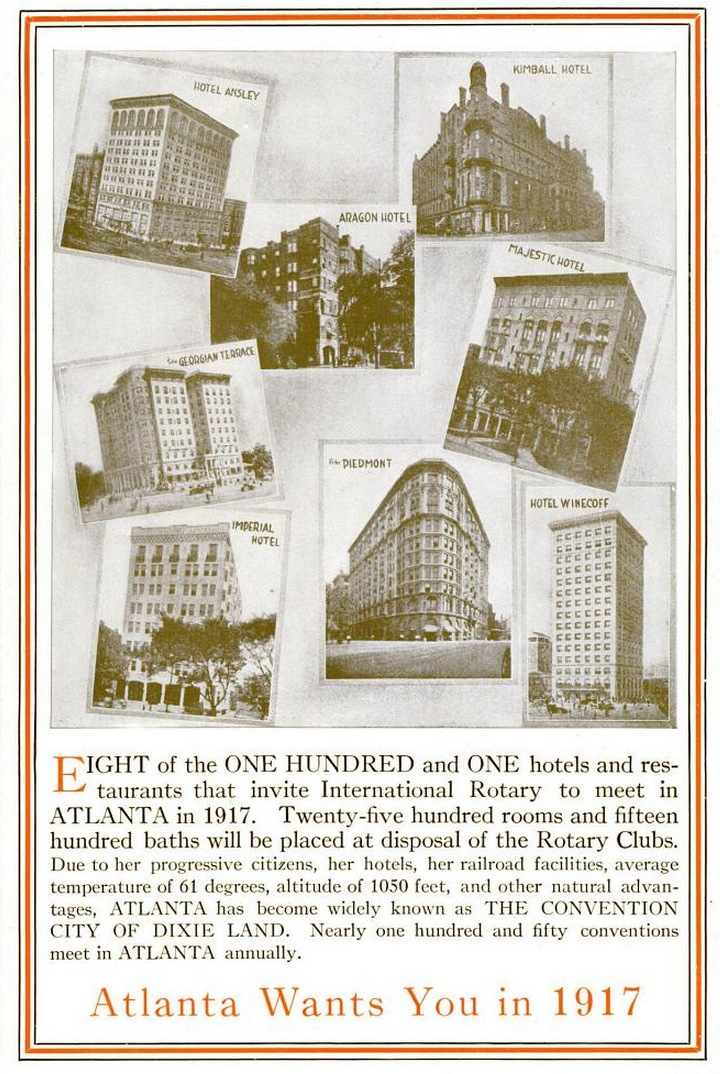
"Convention City of Dixie Land"

An 1859 industrial journal was among the first to note nicknames for Atlanta, Georgia:

An orator claimed for it the signification of "a city among the hills" while a writer has declared that it was the opposite of "rus in urbe" ("country in the city") and proclaimed it "'the city in the woods".

Since then, the city has known numerous nicknames. As of the 2010s, ATL, and The A are the most prevalent.

== Atlanta nicknames ==
- Contemporary nicknames of Atlanta include, in alphabetical order:
  - The A or da A: It is used in local media such as Only in the A, a video channel shown on MARTA rapid transit trains in Atlanta, The Indispensable A, an Atlanta-based email publication, and Straight from the A, an Atlanta-based blog targeted at African Americans. "The A" or "da A" is also used in hip hop and rap songs such as Ludacris and Lloyd's "How We Do It (in da A)", Lil Scrappy's "The A", and T.I.'s "In da A". Atlanta newspaper Creative Loafing listed as one of its "reasons to love Atlanta" that it's "the only city easily identified by just one letter".
  - A-Town
  - The ATL, for its airport code
  - The Big A, trucker CB slang
  - The Big Peach
  - Black Hollywood, Atlanta is home to a thriving black entertainment industry.
  - Black gay mecca
  - Black mecca
  - Capital City of the American South
  - City in a Forest or City of Trees, for its unique tree canopy
  - City of Neighborhoods
  - Dogwood City
  - Empire City of the South
  - Hot 'Lanta, also spelled Hotlanta, first popularized by an instrumental song performed by the Allman Brothers Band. It debuted on their live album At Fillmore East, released in July 1971, the fifth song on the album.
  - Hollywood of the South, became popular due to the city's boom in the film industry.
  - LGBT Capital of the South
  - Running City USA
  - Silicon Peach
  - Wakanda: Atlanta has been compared to the fictional country that is the home of the Black Panther in the Marvel Comics Universe, and portions of the 2018 film Black Panther were filmed in the Atlanta metro area. Rapper and Atlanta native Killer Mike told Stephen Colbert, "Atlanta is Wakanda, for real.".
- Historical nicknames for the city include:
  - Gate City, Gate City of the South, or Gate City of the New South (from Reconstruction through the early 20th century)
  - New York of the South (1870s–1890s)
  - Chicago of the South (1880s–1900s): for Atlanta's "new men, new industries, new buildings, and new spirit" - though it was often remarked that the nickname was not quite accurate in terms of the size of Atlanta vs. the much larger Chicago
  - The City Too Busy to Hate (during Jim Crow and the Civil Rights struggle)
  - Convention City of Dixie (Land) (1910s–1920s)
  - Dogwood City

== Nicknames of other Atlanta areas ==
=== SWATS ===
SWATS, The S.W.A.T.S. or S.W.A.T.S. ("Southwest Atlanta, too strong") is, in street, hip-hop, or local contexts, Southwest Atlanta, plus territory extending into the adjacent cities of College Park and East Point. The term "SWATS" came into vogue around 1996 and was initially made popular by LaFace Records groups Outkast and Goodie Mob. This was the same time that "ATL" became popular as a nickname for Atlanta as a whole.

SWATS in Lyrics

The OutKast song "Peaches (Intro)" states: "For ... the SWATS ... Cause it ain't nuttin but King Shit, all day, err'day". Another Outkast song, "Ova da Wudz" states "put the SWATS, SWATS on your car."

Goodie Mob song "I Refuse Limitation" states "SWATS G.A. by way of Cascade Heights", while their song "Goodie Bag" states "Cause in da SWAT's red hots don't drip or bleed", and in "All A's", CeeLo Green's chorus states "But don't you dare ride through the SWATS without, at least 30 shots".

Erick Sermon rapped "I'm in New York now but I represent the SWATS and A-Town.", in his song "Future Thug" from his sixth solo album 'Chilltown, New York' in 2004.

Media and artists named after SWATS

S.W.A.T.S. is the name of a 2010 web television series by Golden Street Entertainment taking place in Southwest Atlanta.

S.W.A.T.S. is the name of a song by rap group 9.17 on the album Southern Empire released by Motown in 2001.

Young Ju King of da SWATS is an artist featured on ReverbNation.

Also referenced as location of "Gina's Beauty Shop" in the movie with Queen Latifah.

=== Nawf Atlanta ===
Nawf Atlanta, or Nawfside is, a term popularized by rap trio Migos in reference to their place of origin Gwinnett County, primarily the central portion which is located north of the city of Atlanta via Interstate 85.

== See also ==
- List of city nicknames in Georgia (U.S. state)
