= Eugene Smurgis =

Russian explorer (1938–1993)

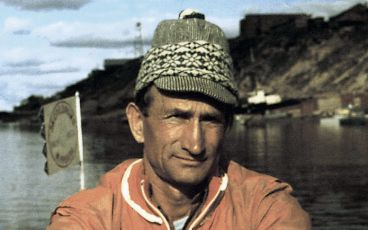
- Born: 19 August 1938; Orenburg, Russian SFSR, Soviet Union
- Died: 15 November 1993 (aged 55); Bay of Biscay, France
- Occupation: Ocean rower
- Known for: First polar ocean rower, first to row the Northeast Passage

Eugene Smurgis (19 August 1938 – 15 November 1993) was a Russian Arctic marine explorer, ultra-long distance rower and Arctic rowing pioneer. From 1967 to 1993, Eugene rowed a total of 48,000 km on oceans, seas and rivers; a distance longer than the circumference of the Earth and the greatest distance ever rowed by a solo ultra-endurance rower. He completed 9900 km of coastal polar ocean rows. Most of his pioneering rows were completed in the Arctic in a primitive open boat with no cabin or crawl space. He was the first recorded polar ocean rower, as the earlier Antarctic expedition by Ernest Shackleton predominantly relied on sails and used oars only to a marginal degree, therefore not meeting the criteria of ocean rowing.

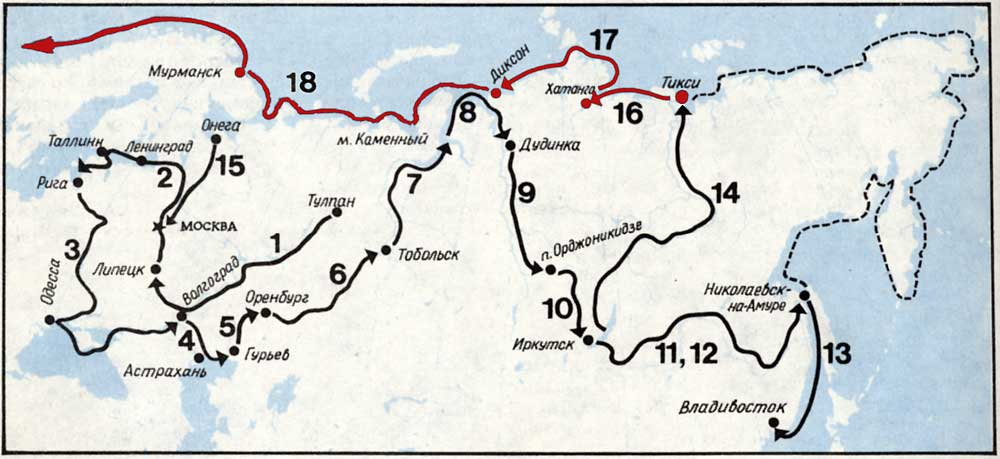
1-15: River rows including Arctic rivers 16-18 (red): Northeast Passage row

== Birth of the passion ==
Eugene Smurgis worked as a physical education teacher in Perm Oblast. From there he undertook his first long distance rowing voyage to Lipetsk. By the summer of 1967 aboard his newly made boat "MAX-4" together with Valery Lyutikov, he rowed down the Kama and Volga Rivers of Russia, and up the Don.

After the voyage he realized that full-time teaching was not compatible with his newly discovered ultra-endurance passion. He quit teaching to become a commercial hunter and woodcutter. For the rest of his life, he would follow the same basic pattern of rowing summers and working winters.

== Ultra-endurance river rowing ==
Over the next twenty years, Eugene Smurgis rowed 36,700 kilometers of inland waterways, navigating all the major rivers and lakes of Russia, and later Siberia. In 1971, he went alone, crossing part of the Caspian Sea in thirteen days. In 1976 he went solo for twenty-six days. Two years later, he rowed north to the Kara Sea, alone that time for 40 days and 40 nights, all in a boat with no cabin, and no crawl space.

== Beginning of the off-coast ocean rowing ==
In 1986, together with his 15 years old son, he embarked on his longest adventure yet, 4,800 kilometers over 44 days. The Smurgis team rowed the Amur River, the Sea of Okhotsk, and the Sea of Japan, finishing in Vladivostok. In 1987 he rowed 1,400 more kilometers on the White Sea and the Onega River.

== First encounter of the Arctic ==
In 1988, he voyaged to the northern Siberian community of Tiksi at 72 degrees north latitude, "ice and pale blue water" to commence the around-the-world expedition. Although he often had to drag his boat, now Pella-Fiord, over rough pack ice, he reached Khatanga, 1300 kilometers away, in 30 days.

== More pioneering in the Arctic Waters ==
In 1990, he rowed the waters around Cape Chelyuskin, reaching a latitude of 77 degrees north, and finished at Dikson, reputedly the coldest place in Asia. His total for the second leg was 2,100 kilometers in 65 days. Within this expedition he established the 27-year standing record of 'the northernmost Latitude reached by a rowing vessel'.

On 30 September 1992, Eugene, again together with his son, Alexander reached Murmansk, an ice-free port and the largest city above the Arctic Circle. Since leaving Dikson, father and son had covered 2,500 kilometers in 43 days.

Next they rowed Murmansk to London, whose distance was 4,000 kilometers, much of it spent above the Arctic Circle. In total, the row was 88 days.

== Last quotes ==
"It has been a constant battle against the weather," Eugene told an interpreter upon arrival in London, "but at no time did we allow ourselves to feel afraid." With a touch of national pride, he added, "The boat was made by craftsmen from the Urals, so we knew it would get us through even the worst storms."

Before his son, Alexander was detained as an illegal immigrant by English authorities, a BBC interview asked about the voyage so far, in which he responded to the question: "How tough was it?", with a shake of his head and a mumbled,"Very difficult."

Eugene, now left alone to his plan of continuing the journey West, was advised by the coast guard to stay inland and row the canals. He responded, however: "I don't want to soak my oars in fresh water anymore. I am an ocean rower now." Kenneth Crutchlow, head of Ocean Rowing Society, who together with Vanya Rezvoy researched the life of Eugene, commented: "His diary supports the impression of a man lacking the gene for fear." Crutchlow also mentioned that due to financial difficulties Eugene had to ration his food on daily basis. In one of the last journal entries quoted in Crutchlow's book The Ocean Rowers, Eugene wrote: "my spirits are usually high. But once it gets dark, my spirits go down with the temperature. But it will be fine. The biggest ventures in life are hard, but you must do them all the way to the end." Crutchlow concluded that: "Eugene had a bulldog grip on his expeditions".

He rowed into a storm at the Bay of Biscay and at the age of 56, and for the first time in his life, lost a battle with a storm, which he sometimes reported in his journals to have been the only guests celebrating his birthdays with him, during his 20-year pattern of embarking on a rowing expedition every summer.

== Legacy ==
The boat of Eugene is exposed in the garden of the Maritime Museum of La Tremblade, in Charente-Maritime, France.

A Library in Lipetsk, Russia is dedicated to and named after Eugene Smurgis, containing a small museum displaying his photographs and expedition maps.

A Memorial stone erected in honor of Eugene Smurgis is located in Kilkee, Ireland

In 2010, a French writer Annie Héral-Vieau wrote a book about Eugene, titled, "Eugene Smurgis, the ocean rower"

20 years later, ocean rowing expedition "Old Pulteney Row to the Pole" attempted a coastal Arctic Ocean row. The team of 6 rowed 202 nautical miles (a distance 26 times shorter than Eugene Smurgis Arctic rows) in 40 days (speed several times slower than Eugene Smurgis solo rows).
