= Underneath =

Underneath or The Underneath may refer to:

== Film and television ==
- The Underneath (film), a 1995 film directed by Steven Soderbergh, starring Peter Gallagher
- "Underneath" (Angel), an episode of Angel
- "Underneath" (Arrow), an episode of Arrow
- "Underneath" (Helstrom), an episode of Helstrom
- "Underneath" (The X-Files), an episode of The X-Files

== Music ==
- The Underneath (band), a Japanese rock band

=== Albums ===
- Underneath (Code Orange album) or the title song, 2020
- Underneath (Hanson album), or the title song, 2004
- Underneath (The Verve Pipe album), or the title song, 2001
- Underneath, by David Wilcox, 1999

=== Songs ===
- "Underneath" (Adam Lambert song), on the 2012 album Trespassing
- "Underneath" (Alanis Morissette song), 2008
- "Underneath" (Tarja song), 2011
- "Underneath", by Buckcherry from Time Bomb
- "Underneath", by Jessica Simpson from In This Skin
- "Underneath", by Starflyer 59 from Old
- "The Underneath", by Robyn Hitchcock from A Star for Bram

== Other media ==
- The Underneath (novel), a 2008 novel by Kathi Appelt
- Underneath.com, an undergarment shopping comparison website
