= Fuel card =

Credit card designed to purchase fuel

A fuel card or fleet card is used as a payment card most commonly for gasoline, diesel, and other fuels at gas stations. Fleet cards can also be used to pay for vehicle maintenance and expenses at the discretion of the fleet owner or manager. Most fuel cards are charge cards.

Fleet/fuel cards are unique due to the convenient and comprehensive reporting that accompanies their use. These cards allow management of the costs associated with a vehicle (or fleet of vehicles) through real time accounting and controlling purchases (such as through limiting spending to a capped amount and/or restrictions on purchase locations).

Fleet cards can be provided not only by oil brands like Shell, Chevron, ExxonMobil, but also by companies that only specialize in providing fuel cards such as Greenarc, Edenred, WEX Inc., Comdata, FleetCards USA, Petrol Plus Region, Fuelman and others. Additionally, some rideshare companies have fleet cards for their drivers, which allow the drivers to have gas money deducted from their earnings.

== Origins ==
=== United Kingdom ===
In its infancy, fuel cards were only printed with the company name, vehicle registration and a signature strip on the reverse. No electronic data was stored. Fuelling sites would verify the company, vehicle registration (on the forecourt) against the card and also the signature written on the back. The site would allow access to the fuel once the retailer's receipt had been signed for and cross checked against the signature written on the back of the card.

Initially, fuel card networks were very small and based around truck roads and main haulage routes. For example, in 1983, the Keyfuels site network consisted of only seven stations. Therefore, they were initially targeted at haulage or delivery companies. A few years later, cards became embossed rather than printed. This was due to provide the cards with a greater longevity—frequent use would rub off the printed information.

Due to the lack of electronic data on the fuel cards at this stage, transactions would be recorded by the card being 'stamped' onto a manual transaction sheet. Further details detailing date, time, volume, grade of fuel and registration would be hand-written.

During the mid- to late 1980s, fuel cards began to use magnetic strip technology. This meant fuel cards could be processed by a retailer electronically and reduced the risk of human error when recording transaction details.

Magnetic strips also enabled fuel card providers to increase fuel card security by ensuring PINs were encoded into the card. Although when the magnetic strip is swiped though a fuel card reader, the transaction is still only verified by checking signatories to this day.

In the advent of outdoor terminals, these PINs became compulsory in order to re-fuel.

The reasoning behind moving from the magnetic strip to smartchip technology was down to the fact that the magnetic strip could be cloned and the data written onto a dummy card. Also, the use of fuel cards was far heavier than that of debit or credit cards, and therefore it became apparent that the magnetic strip began to wear out far quicker.

Smartchip technology (similar to Chip and PIN) is the largest development in the fuel card industry in recent years. (See Smartchip benefits)

Increasingly, supermarkets are exploring opportunities with incorporating fuel cards, although many still lack a program. While Tesco & Sainsbury's have the ability to collect loyalty points (Clubcard & Nectar points) and pay with credit, they lack a dedicated fuel card, unlike Morrisons, who has a fuel card offering. Asda, despite having the cheapest average fuel in 2012, has no fuel card.

During 2008, market maturity has led to users increasingly expecting more from fuel cards than discount pricing, with the demand for service, savings and security leading to the appearance of dedicated account management. While most fuel card suppliers handle customer queries via random-operator call centres, customer preference is increasingly for a named individual to handle their business. Respected publication Fleet News reported in July 2008 that more than a quarter of fleet managers are unhappy with the level of service offered by their fuel card supplier.

A new category of fuel card is emerging in the form of "electric fuel cards" as typified by operations from AllStar and Paua.

=== Ireland ===
The longest running provider of fuel cards in Ireland is Fuelwise, with the company being founded in 1989 and growing to hold the largest site network and provide a range of services alongside fuel cards such as Telematics and Vehicle Walkaround Checks.

=== United States ===
The advent of fleet cards can be traced back to the 1960s and 1970s when key stops/key locks and standalone card locks were used by independent marketers and filling station owners. A Key Stop or Key Lock fuel control system was a system where a group of commercial fleets could access a fuel pump with a unique key that tracked solely their gallons through that pump. This technology is obsolete and no longer available commercially. A card lock control system uses a punch card or magnetic stripe card to uniquely identify a fuel buyer on a private server. This was done to avoid a credit card interchange fee which raised the cost of fuel considerably. The first commercial fuel cards resembled a credit card with a name and a company logo on them. When a customer entered a filling station, the cashier would take down the customer's name and company information to authenticate ownership of the card. This process was time-consuming and was vulnerable to fraudulent transactions. With the advent of computers and computer software in the 1980s, the development of the fleet card industry quickly expanded. The invention of the magnetic stripe and magnetic card reader allowed petroleum marketers to control fuel pump transactions, leading to today's wide range of fleet card security features and state of the art reporting systems to track all fleet expenses. These "intelligent" systems make fleet management convenient and secure, as fleet card owners are able to track fleet fuel use with increased accuracy, receiving reports in real time on the fueling habits. Business owners are able to limit employee fueling by time-of-day and day-of-week.

=== India ===
Indian consumers saw their first fuel card during 2001 from Bharat Petroleum. The card was mainly aimed at retail customers for personal vehicles. Subsequently, various products aimed at various customer segments were launched by all oil companies – Smart fleet by Bharat Petroleum, XTRAPOWER by Indian Oil, Drive Track by Hindustan Petroleum, and Transconnect by Reliance Industries. While Transconnect found favours during its launch, the same withered away once Reliance shut its outlets due to huge price difference. Indian Oil's XTRAPOWER Fleet Card Program has grown to be the largest fuel card in India, followed by Smart.

== Misconceptions ==
Although fuel cards look like credit cards and use very similar technology, their use and implementation is significantly different. The main differences from credit cards are:

- Payment terms often get shorter (but can be negotiated direct with card issuer much more easily than credit card terms)
- No rolling-balance is cleared (or partially cleared) each month
- Can be cheaper due to a system designed to bypass credit card interchanges and their mark ups.
- Transactions can be customized allowing only certain grades of fuel e.g. petrol, petrol & diesel, petrol and gas oil, etc.
- Fuelling transaction limits can be applied using Smartchip technology
- Liability for fraudulent transactions usually remains with user (depending upon agreement with card provider)
- Fraud prevention systems exist to block service areas by nation, state, or postage codes to stop theft.
- Card "hotlists" (a.k.a. "authorisation" or "onstop" lists) received via different providers
- Interim period after stop/hotlist request and card denied at fuelling station can be longer (although online authorisation networks are increasing)
- Payment terminals separate to those used for credit/debit cards (bunkered cards only)
- Fuel not technically paid at point of sale - simply allocated on account for payment at later date (bunkered only)
- Some cards allow the purchase of such non-fuel fleet related items, such as lubricants, hotels, and diesel exhaust fluid.

== Security ==
Depending upon the individual fuel card and the supplier, security benefits of fuel cards can include:

- available local businesses that can work with one on the program and keeping one's business safe
- cashless transactions
- chip-and-PIN protection
- current odometer reports with every fuel purchase
- detailed invoicing – fully itemising transactions for individual cards
- on-line account administration to stop cards 24/7
- transactions restricted to fuel-related products
- reporting of unusual transactions
- restrictions available by postal code to limit the cards function in a specific area of service.
- daily transaction limits.
- daily gallon limits to limit a would be thief.
- decrease in occurrences of credit card 'skimming'
- real time email or text message "e-Receipts" of transactions
- evidence that can be connected with internal Human Resource policies that enable clear responsibility to terminate employees for stealing fuel

=== Smartchip benefits ===
Fuel card providers realised there were many benefits from moving over to the smartcard from the magnetic strip:

- Smartchips are difficult to clone
- Fuelling limits can be enforced (see Smartchip technology)
- Far more durable than magnetic strips, therefore cards last longer
- Need for cards to be re-created reduced due to longevity
- Smartchip cannot be damaged by electro-magnetic radiation e.g. mobile phones, magnets, speakers, etc.

As of 2007, only 50% or so of fuel cards on offer utilise the smartchip technology.

==== Added features of smartchip technology ====
Fuelling limits can also be programmed into a fuel card using smartchip technology to specify the following:

- Volume allowed per transaction
- Volume allowed per day
- Volume allowed per week
- Number of transactions allowed per day
- Number of transactions allowed per week
- Days of the week card can be used
- Times of the day card can be used
- Number of incorrect PIN entries allowed
- Card lock-out period after incorrect PINs

== Commercial use in business ==
Commercial fuel cards are designed with fleets in mind and seek to avoid both the percentage up-charges of credit card companies as well as the theft risk retail credit cards expose a business to due to their focus on convenience over financial security.

Typically, the majority of businesses using fuel cards are those which heavily rely on motor vehicles on a day-to-day basis e.g. transport, haulage, courier services. One of the primary reasons a business will use a fuel card is to obtain (potentially) significant savings both on the current price of fuel and on administrative costs. It would be normal for the business to receive a single weekly invoice, payable by direct debit; this replaces the manual reconciliation of individual paper receipts which could, for larger organizations, number in the hundreds each week. A number of additional benefits are available for users of fuel cards from a supplier offering an e-business capability.

In most cases, fuel cards can provide fuel at a wholesale price as opposed to standard retail. This way, discount fuel can be purchased without needing to buy in bulk.

Furthermore, the management and security concerning fuel purchases is greatly improved via the use of fuel cards. These features often prove themselves attractive to businesses, especially with those operating large fleets which can sometimes be in the thousands of vehicles.

== International fuel cards ==
While most fuel cards are for use in a particular country, there are some companies who offer international fuel cards themselves and some via a third party. International site networks often use fully automatic fuel pumps to avoid possible language difficulties and are specially designed to account for different taxation regimes e.g. producing separate invoices for each country which fuel was purchased in a particular month to account for different rates of VAT charged. These site networks sometimes offer the ability to reclaim VAT paid in each country, for a small percentage of the amount reclaimed. Some international fuel card providers solely offer fuel cards for business fleets, others also for individuals. However, the system of fuel cards has meanwhile spread throughout Europe, where they are called cartões de combustivel, cartecarburanti, zakelijk tankpas, tankkaart, fleetpass, cartes de carburants, and Tankkarten.

=== Bunkered fuel cards ===
Fuel card providers which operate on a bunkering basis aim to achieve a fuel reserve on a particular network in order to achieve a discounted price, therefore taking advantage of economies of scale.

For example, a company may purchase one million litres of diesel at 72.50 and aim to sell this on to the customer with a mark up of 2.5 pence per litre — 75.00 PPL.

Bunkered fuel card companies sometimes also offer customers their own fuel bunker to under the premise of further benefiting from a discounted price. Furthermore, a customer can also hope to achieve a saving by way of avoiding any market increases in the standard market price for that particular fuel. In short, customer fuel bunkering has many pros & cons:

Pros:

- new-start businesses given a vital boost by using fuel cards if credit insurance cannot be obtained (due to lack of company history)
- if the market for that particular fuel rises immediately after a purchase — the customer has potentially made a saving

Cons:

- a healthy cash flow is required to sustain the lump sum payment for their fuel purchase — often difficult for new businesses
- if the market for that particular fuel falls immediately after a purchase — the customer has potentially lost out on a saving opportunity

=== Retail fuel cards ===
In contrast to bunkered, retail fuel cards operate by way of allowing the customer to draw fuel at almost any fuelling station (in same method as credit card). Often providers will levy a surcharge in addition to the retail price as advertised at the fuelling station. The retail price given is often considerably higher than that of the bunkered. The majority of fuel cards provide weekly (advance) notification of fuel price generally applicable nationwide.

Although retail is generally more expensive, there are a number of exceptions depending on the region, particular brand/site and timing of fuel purchased. Retail fuel can be cheaper in certain regions, particularly those near to a major port. Further reasons for the difference in price may be due to local economy (e.g. north / south of England) and whether the site is close to any main transport links i.e. the fuel costs more to deliver into the site. As for timing, the supermarkets or large providers often have a great deal of fuel in their stock reserves, so if the market increases rapidly, they would generally take longer than smaller providers to reflect this change.

Fuel cards are not all the same and 'shopping around' is advised. Typically, a supplier will offer just one or two cards. The user should seek an independent supplier offering a range of cards from major brands, so that the most appropriate fuel card for their individual needs can be chosen. A fuel card with little or no motorway coverage but extensive coverage of metropolitan areas, for example, could be of limited use to a national haulier but ideal for a taxi company. A supplier offering only diesel cards will be of minimal appeal to a fleet manager responsible for a petrol-only or mixed-fuel company car fleet.

Furthermore, retail fuel prices have decreased over the past 15 or so years largely due to supermarkets providing fuel at their superstores at hugely discounted prices in order to entice users to the store. Supermarket prices are an irrelevance to many diesel users, as very few supermarket forecourts are accessible by heavy goods vehicles or coaches.

== See also ==
- Gift card
- Pay at the pump
- Telephone card
