= Pay at the pump =

System used at filling stations

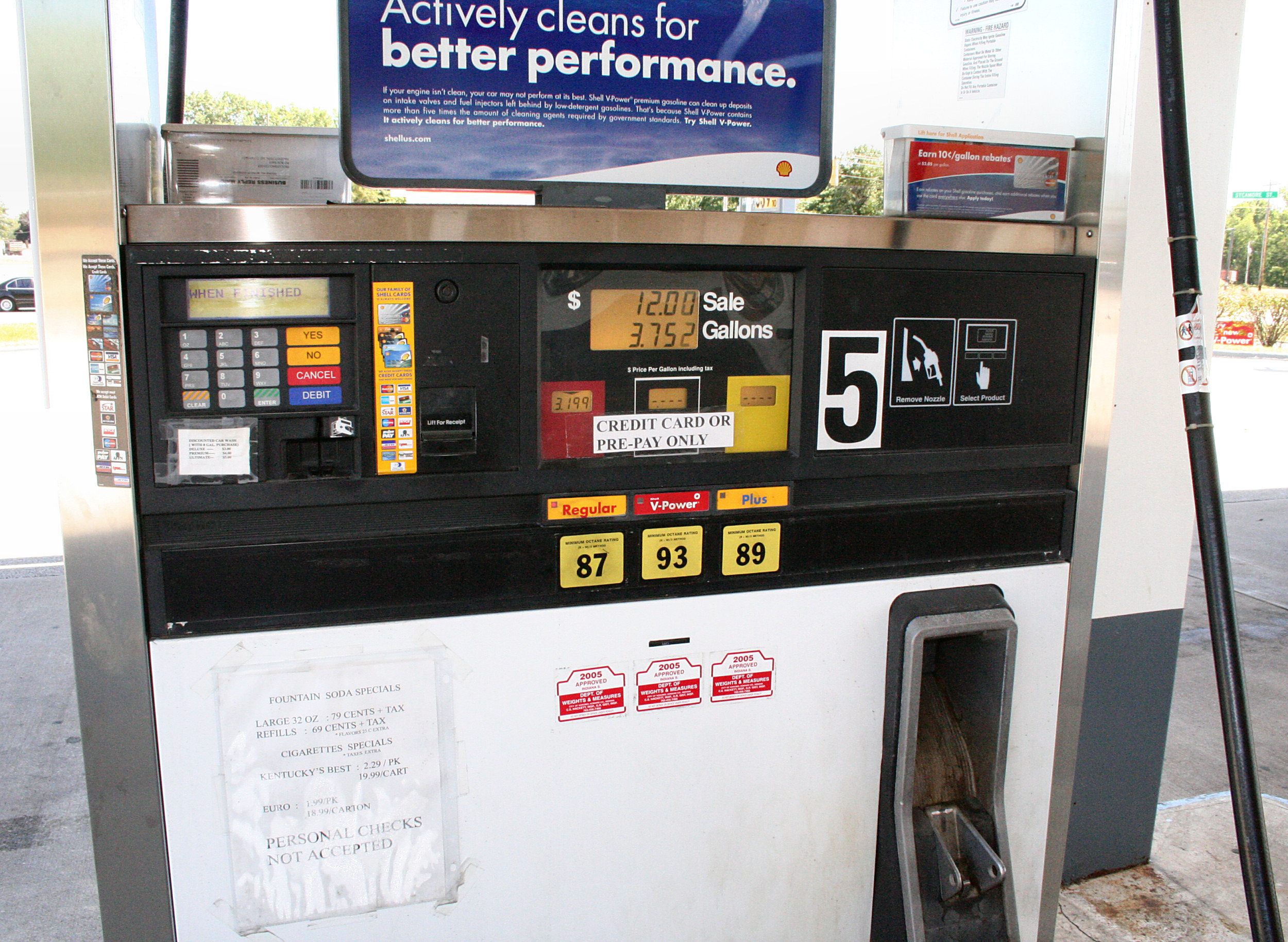
A pay-at-the-pump system on Wayne Vista pumps

Pay at the pump is a system used at many filling stations, where customers can pay for their fuel by inserting a credit card, debit card, or fuel card into a slot on the pump, bypassing the requirement to make the transaction with the station attendant or to walk away from one's vehicle. A few areas have gas stations that use electronic tolling transponders as a method of payment, such as Via Verde in Portugal.

Pay at the pump was first invented in 1973 by George Randolph “Randy” Nicholson (1937–2020), debuting at an E-Z Serve gas station in Abilene, Texas, but did not take off until the 1980s. The system was introduced in 1982 in Europe, and Mobil later claimed to have been the first gas station to introduce pay at the pump in the United States in 1986. Only thirteen percent of convenience stores had the technology by 1994. Eighty percent of US convenience stores used it by 2002, and virtually all US stores do today. In 2004, Sheetz was the first to use touchscreen kiosks by the pump, where customers can also order in-store foodservice items that they pick up after fueling. In 2012, Zarco USA was the first to have ordering touchscreens on the pump.

Pay at the pump is seen as a way to keep the cost of gasoline down by reducing the need for employees at filling stations. It is considered to be a major change from the days in which full service was the norm at filling stations, and the attendant not only pumped fuel, but also washed the windshield and checked the fluids and tire pressure, all while the customer remained in the vehicle. Full service is legally mandated in the US states of New Jersey and parts of Oregon. Oregon allows for commercial self-serve of gasoline for business use through a cardlock network, such as Pacific Pride or CFN.

The technology has also allowed the introduction of unattended filling stations (where allowable by law), which are mainly outside supermarkets and other retail establishments and have no connected store facility.

== Fraud ==
Those who use the pay at the pump feature could be putting themselves at risk for fraud, as thieves can attach skimmers to the pumps that can steal the information off the cards used to make purchases. Many debit cards can be used to make the purchase either as debit or credit. But those who make the purchases as debit are potentially feeding their information into the skimmers.

Without the human interaction, there is no verification system when credit cards are used to make purchases, and no signature is required. This enables those in possession of stolen or cloned credit cards, or those who are otherwise making unauthorized use of another's card to purchase gasoline without a signature. Many stations now require customers making credit-based transactions to enter their zip code (United States) or equivalent (other countries) in order to be allowed to make a fuel purchase. The security of credit card numbers on receipts has been nearly nullified, as the vast majority of retailers now truncate to only the last four digits of a card on a receipt, with legal force in many states and provinces.

In the United States, EMV chip card acceptance at gas pumps was part of the liability shift, where the entity that does not comply with the chip card upgrades will be liable for any fraud. The liability shift was originally set to be at October 2017 but was moved to October 2020 by all payment brands, and later the payment brands extended the liability shift to April 2021.

== Cost to consumers ==
The vast majority of gas pumps with pay-at-the-pump capabilities will place a temporary hold on a certain amount of money, generally $75-$150, in a customer's account following the use of a debit or credit card to make a purchase. The pump must do this pre-authorization before allowing a customer to pump fuel to guarantee funds are available to pay for said fuel. The length of time the funds are placed on hold, and are unavailable to the customer, is totally dependent on how fast the customer's bank processes the transaction. Depending on the bank, it can take a few minutes to a few business days before the funds on hold are released.

While this amount is placed on hold, the customer could be penalized for non-sufficient funds when making other purchases on the same account.

To avoid pre-authorizations and holds placed on their accounts, customers can pay for fuel inside the gas station and not use pay-at-the-pump services.

== Cost to businesses and employees ==
Paying at the pump may lead to customers avoiding going inside a convenience store and purchasing snacks, beverages, tobacco, or automotive products, thereby hurting the profits stations make from such sales.

== Pay at the pump using a smartphone ==
Some gas pumps have been upgraded to offer contactless payment, where mobile wallets like Apple Pay and Google Pay are accepted, as well as mobile features to pay at the pump online, without interacting with the pump for the payment, by identifying the pump number in the mobile wallet and charging the card stored in the wallet.

Amazon also offers pay with Alexa at selected gas pumps.

== See also ==
- Speedpass
- National Association of Convenience Stores
