= On Deck =

On Deck may refer to:

- On-deck, a baseball term.
- "On Deck" (song), a 2020 song by Abra Cadabra
- OnDeck Capital, a company
