= Alpha Group International =

British financial services business

- Company type: Public
- Traded as: LSE: ALPA
- Industry: Financial services
- Founded: 2009; 17 years ago
- Headquarters: London, England
- Key people: Clive Khan (Chairman); Morgan Tillbrook (CEO)
- Revenue: ▲£135.6 million (2024)
- Operating income: ▲£118.3 million (2024)
- Net income: ▲£92.7 million (2024)
- Website: www.alphagroup.com

Alpha Group International plc is a British financial services business specialising in the management of foreign exchange risk for corporate businesses. It is listed on the London Stock Exchange until it was acquired by Corpay in October 2025.

== History ==
The company was founded by Morgan Tillbrook as a foreign exchange management business known as Alpha FX in 2009. It was the subject of an initial public offering on the Alternative Investment Market in 2017, and acquired the multi-bank trading platform, Cobase, in September 2023. It then moved to the main market of the London Stock Exchange in April 2024.

In July 2025, Corpay, an American provider of payments and spend management systems, announced a deal to acquire Alpha Group in a $2.2 billion cash deal. The transaction was approved by the court on 28 October 2025, thereby allowing it to proceed to completion.
