= The Global Scavenger Hunt =

International travel adventure competition

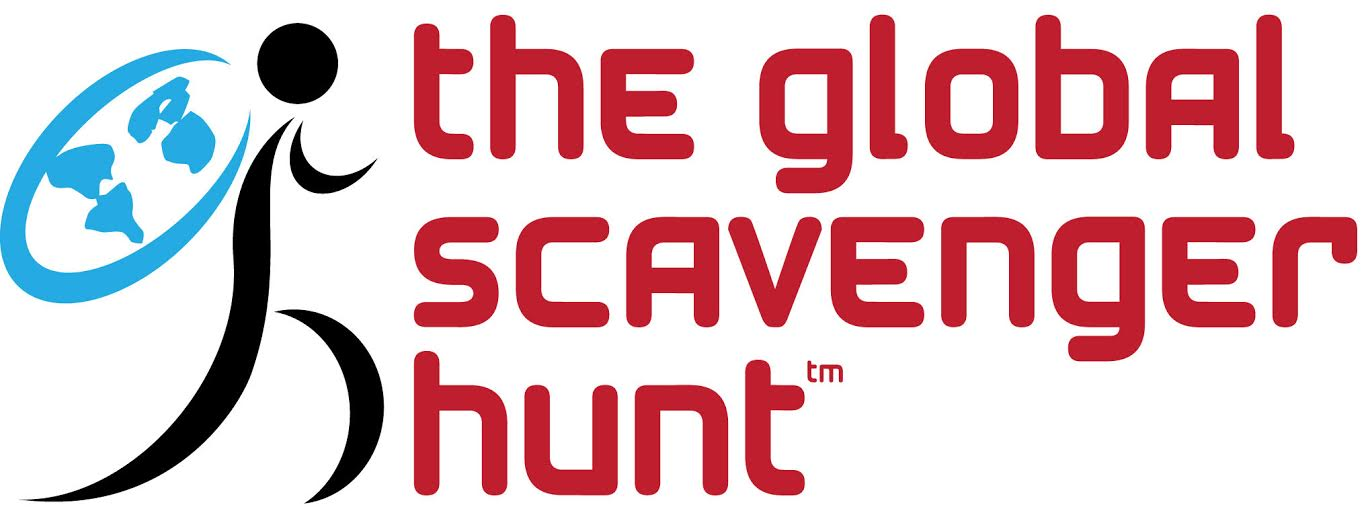
- Status: Active
- Genre: Annual Travel Competition
- Venue: Global
- Inaugurated: 2002
- Website: http://globalscavengerhunt.com/

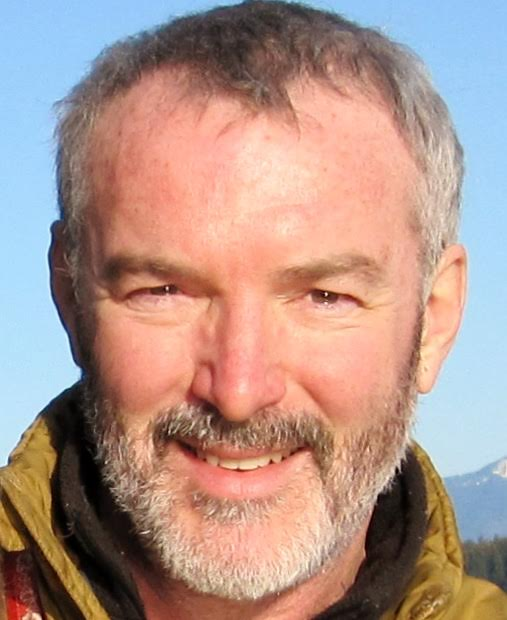
Event Director William Chalmers

The Global Scavenger Hunt is an annual international travel adventure competition in which two-person teams travel around the world in competition with other teams vying to win the title of "The World’s Greatest Travelers".

== History ==
The first event, scheduled for 2001, was postponed due to 9/11. The inaugural event took place in the spring of 2002. A spring 2003 event was cancelled due to the SARS epidemic and the onset of the Iraq War. The event has been held annually since 2008. The Global Scavenger Hunt originally called GreatEscape, was created by William D. Chalmers in 1999 and launched in 2000. Inspired by his 1989 participation in an around-the-world race called the HumanRace, Chalmers, and his travel companion, Andy J. Valvur, won the one-off event collecting the $20,000 first place prize money in 17 days. Chalmers later wrote a book chronicling their exploits entitled A Blind Date with the World in 2000 and was later dubbed the "world's greatest traveler" in National Geographic Traveler magazine. After sixteen successful events, The Ringmaster retired with Chalmers handing The Global Scavenger Hunt over to Charles Brown & Anne Eubanks in 2024.

== The Event ==
The Global Scavenger Hunt is a series of rallies around the world. Competitors participating attempt to complete a series of culturally-oriented scavenges from a scavenger hunt book created for each leg of the rally-like event. Scavenges are assigned points based on completion degree of difficulty.

During each event, competitors travel to, and within, at least ten countries, but never know in advance which countries they are going to be visiting. The event is designed to test the participants collective 'travel IQ' requiring them to overcome language and communications barriers, cultural nuances, logistics, jet lag, team dynamics and 23-days of traveling across 24 time zones through ten countries.

Teams are, at times, prohibited from using any technology to assist them and are limited to using only local modes of public transportation as they attempt to complete the scavenges in the goal of fostering the "trusting of strangers in strange lands."

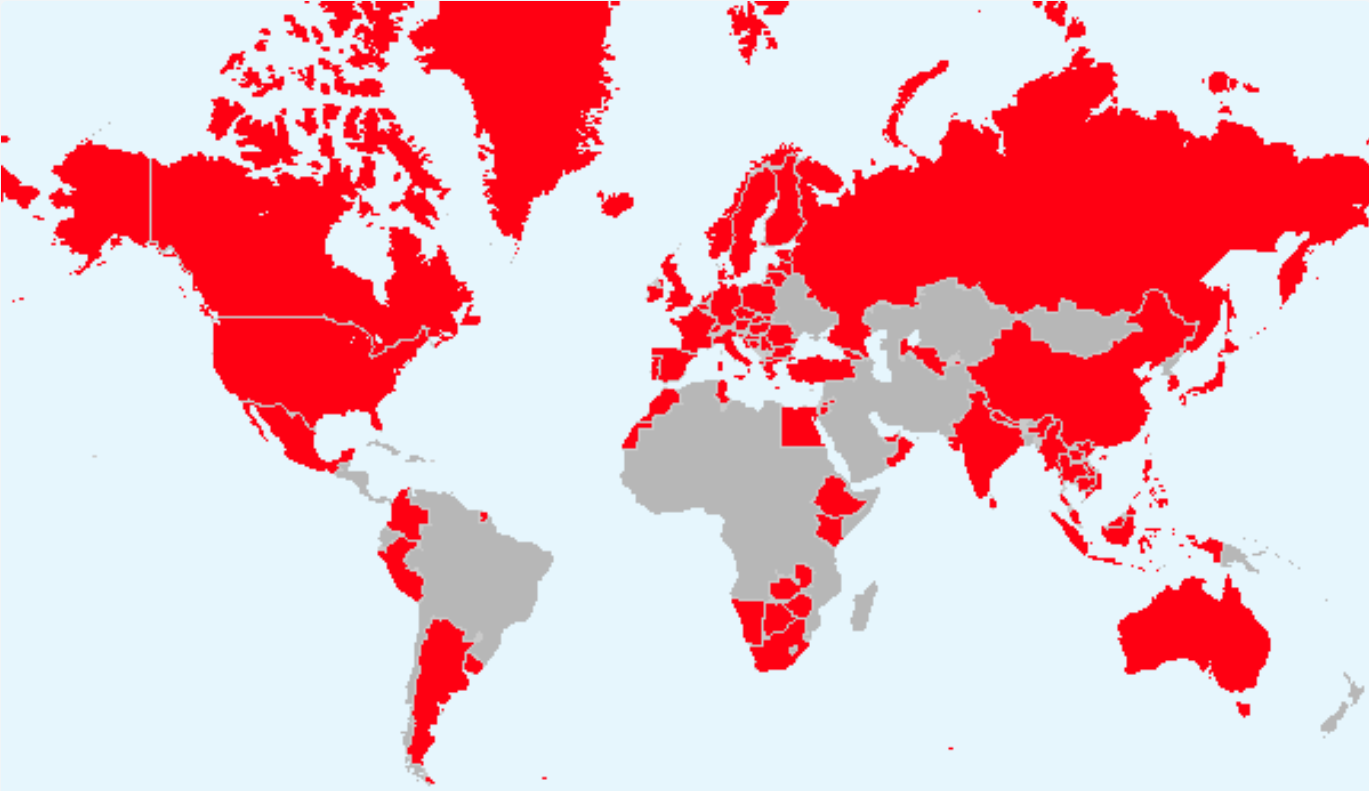
Countries visited by the Global Scavenger Hunt event as of 2023

The scavenges, based on a risk-reward points system, include food scavenges, participatory 'site-doing' (not site-seeing) scavenges, good karma-building scavenges, urban, rural, art and nature-oriented photo safaris, playing Bartender Roulette, polling locals on issues of the day, performing blind taste tests, figuring out how to crash major cultural happenings.

Each leg is tallied and the eventual winners of the event are crowned The World's Greatest Travelers and given that title for that year. The event is considered to be the annual "world travel championship" and called the "Super Bowl of travel adventure competitions". Winning teams earn the right to defend the title of The World's Greatest Travelers in the next event with all entry fees waived. The event is open to all international travel adventure competitors, and has no set course as it is changed each year. As of 2023, the annual around the world travel adventure event has visited 94 countries across 6 continents.

== Events to date ==
- 2002 (April 12 – May 4) – Los Angeles to Japan to Hong Kong to Thailand to UAE to Egypt to Turkey to Italy to Switzerland to Germany to New York City, USA
- 2003 – Scheduled for April 2003 and was cancelled due to the global SARS epidemic and outbreak of the Iraq War.
- 2004 (April 16 – May 8) – Los Angeles to China to Viet Nam to Cambodia to Thailand to India to UAE to Morocco to Gibraltar to Spain to Portugal to New York City, USA
- 2005 (April 15 – May 7) – Los Angeles to China to India to UAE to Egypt to Turkey to Czech Republic to Austria to Poland to Hungary to New York City, USA
- 2008 (April 11 – May 3) – San Francisco to China to Malaysia to Singapore to Nepal to Bahrain to Egypt to Greece to Macedonia to Bulgaria to Romania to The Netherlands to Toronto, Canada
- 2009 (April 17 – May 9) – Seattle to Taiwan to Cambodia to Thailand to India to Turkey to Tunisia to Germany to Denmark to Sweden to Iceland to Boston, USA
- 2010 (April 9 – May 1) – San Francisco to Hong Kong to Viet Nam to Laos to Myanmar to Thailand to Sri Lanka to Jordan to Austria to Slovakia to Germany to Luxembourg to France to New York City, USA
- 2011 (April 15 – May 7) – Los Angeles to Korea to Philippines to Indonesia to Singapore to India to Turkey to Spain to Gibraltar to Morocco to Portugal to New York City, USA
- 2012 (April 13 – May 5) – San Francisco to Taiwan to Myanmar to Thailand to Sri Lanka to Oman to Cyprus to Italy to San Marino to Slovenia to Austria to Czech Republic to Washington D.C., USA
- 2013 (April 12 – May 4) – Los Angeles to China to Vietnam to Cambodia to Malaysia to Nepal to Qatar to Germany to Denmark to Sweden to Norway to Toronto, Canada
- 2014 (April 12 – May 4) – Vancouver to Japan to South Korea to India to UAE to Turkey to Hungary to Austria to Slovakia to Czech Republic to Poland to Chicago, USA
- 2015 (April 10 – May 2) – Los Angeles to Fiji to Australia to Indonesia to Malaysia to UAE to Italy to Switzerland to France to Andorra to Spain to Colombia to Miami, USA
- 2016 (April 15 – May 7) – Mexico City to Japan to India to Oman to Kenya to Poland to Lithuania to Estonia to Russia to Finland to Washington D.C., USA
- 2017 (April 14 – May 6) – San Francisco to China to Vietnam to Thailand to Sri Lanka to Egypt to Brussels to England to Wales to Ireland to Iceland to New York City, USA
- 2018 (April 13 – May 5) – San Francisco to Taiwan to India to Ethiopia to Zimbabwe/Zambia/Botswana/Namibia to South Africa to Argentina/Uruguay to Peru to USA
- 2019 (April 12 – May 4) – Vancouver, Canada to Vietnam to Myanmar to Thailand to UAE to Jordan to Greece to Morocco to Spain to Gibraltar to Portugal to New York City, USA
- 2023 (April 14 - May 6) – San Francisco to Seoul to Samarkand to Tbilisi to Jerusalem to Sofia to Zagreb to Istanbul to Montreal, Canada
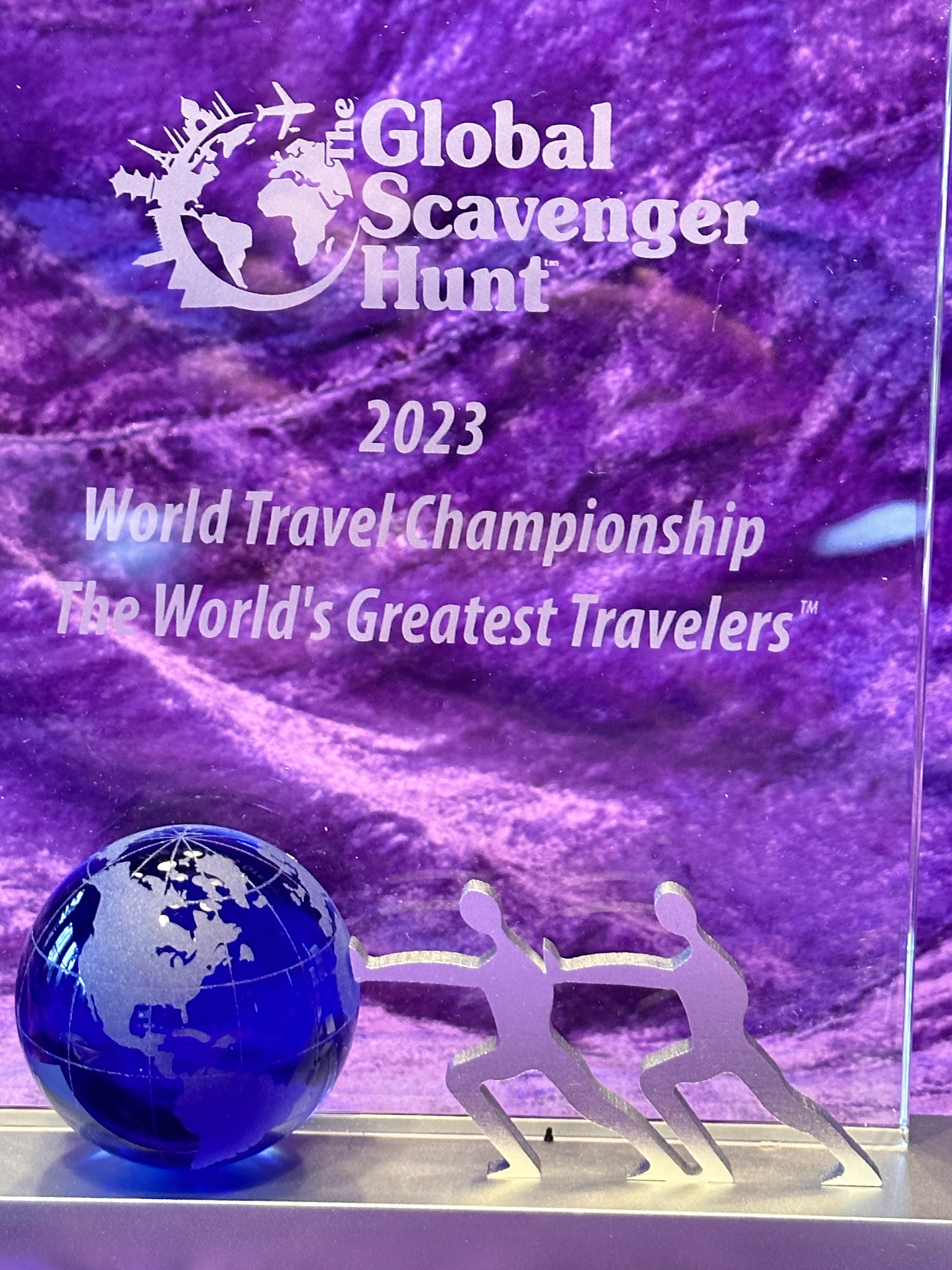
  Global Scavenger Hunt 2023 Winner's Trophy

== Teams ==
Year	1st place	2nd place	3rd place
2002	Victoria Rivers & Joan Harvard(USA)	Marvin Schmidt & David Matichuk(CAN)	Carol Branson & Roger Mattingly(USA)
2004	Alicia Bleier & Vicki Sheahen(USA)	Randy Hall & Steve Belkin(USA)	Raj Krishnan & Carole Herdegen(USA)
2005	Lisa Hunt & Helen Qubain(USA/BEL)	Pat & Paul Buescher(USA)	Vickie Sheahan & Deborah Grove(USA)
2008	Bart Hackley & Steve Hunt (The Beach Boys)(USA)	Zoe Littlepage and Rainey Booth (Lawyers without Borders)(USA)	JoAnne & Jeff Blakely (USA)
2009	Zoe Littlepage & Rainey Booth (Lawyers without Borders)(USA)	Ben Penchas & Christine Littlepage (Something Old & Something New)(USA/ENG)	Sherry & Ken Fardie (Miami Twice)(USA)
2010	Zoe Littlepage & Rainey Booth (Lawyers without Borders)(USA)	Heidi & Lily Hutchinson (100% Bajan)(BAH)	Barbara Schoenfeld & Christine Littlepage (Barbara & the Barbadian)(USA/ENG)
2011	Zoe Littlepage & Rainey Booth (Lawyers without Borders)(USA)	Natasha Hanberry & David Ardoin (The Silver Surfers)(USA)	Emily & Elizabeth Booth (Sister Act)(USA)
2012	Andrew Parsonage & Saskia van Waaijenburg (You're not in Guatemala now, Dr Ropata)(NZ/NDL)	Fiona & Katrina Atkinson (Sydney Sisters)(AUS)	Zoe Littlepage & Rainey Booth (Lawyers without Borders)(USA)
2013	Philip Bouchard & Gerald Obrecht (The Ogopogos)(CAN)	Andrew Parsonage & Saskia van Waaijenburg (You're not in Guatemala now, Dr Ropata)(NZ/NDL)	Demetrius Canton & Margarita Pas (Miami in the Mix)(USA/POL)
2014	Zoe Littlepage & Rainey Booth (Lawyers without Borders)(USA)	TIE- Emily Booth & Rainey Booth Jr. (Sister Act II)(USA) Kim & Maria Lardie (Retired Traveling Chicks)(USA)	
2015	Fiona & Katrina Atkinson (Sydney Sisters)(AUS)	Tania di'Re & Mickey Gupta (Buns & Bird)(USA)	Zoe Littlepage & Rainey Booth (Lawyers without Borders)(USA)
2016	Zoe Littlepage & Rainey Booth (Lawyers without Borders)(USA)		
2017	Alan & Sydney Ying (Team Ying)(USA)	Michael Pavlic & Gillian Shure (Go TSA Pre-Check Yourself)(USA)	Thomas & Paula Patterson (SLO Folks)(USA)
2018	Paula & Thomas Patterson (SLO Folks)(USA)	Betty & Jim Karam (NOLA 2nd Line)(USA)	Kim & Gil Gagnon (Leo & the Crab)(USA)
2019	Zoe Littlepage & Rainey Booth (Lawyers without Borders)(USA)	Kathryn & Eric Verwillow (Lazy Monday)(USA)	Vivian Reyes & Salvatore Iaquinta (Order & Chaos)(USA)
2023	Vivian Reyes & Salvatore Iaquinta (Order & Chaos)(USA)	Zoe Littlepage & Rainey Booth (Lawyers without Borders)(USA)	Kathleen Wood & Margie McCartney (Cubs Fans)(USA)

== Foundation ==
The world travel championship adventure competition also served as a charitable fundraising event for humanitarian organizations through the Great Escape Foundation (2002–2024). The funding was used to build schools (mostly co-ed elementary) with organizations like Free The Children in developing nations such as: Kenya, Niger, Sri Lanka, Sierra Leone, India, Haiti, Ethiopia and Ecuador, and to finance micro-loans in conjunction with KIVA that have assisted over 3,900 families in 80 countries. The Foundation has also funded a medical clinic and midwife educational center in Niger in conjunction with the Nomad Foundation.

== See also ==
- The Amazing Race
- Eco-Challenge
- Raid Gauloises
- Geocaching
- Teva Lea Race
- City Chase
- Great Urban Race
