= Ocean Gateway Pier II =

Cruise ship pier in Portland, Maine, US

Coordinates: 43°39′35″N 70°14′36″W

Ocean Gateway Pier II is a floating deepwater cruise ship pier located at the Ocean Gateway International Marine Passenger Terminal in Portland, Maine.

Construction of the pier began on 1 November 2010 with a groundbreaking ceremony attended by Maine governor John Baldacci and city officials. It was opened on 10 September 2011, when Enchantment of the Seas became the first vessel to dock at the pier.

The total cost of building the pier was about $6 million, paid for by a state transportation bond. It was built by the Reed & Reed construction company, which submitted a bid about $1.5 million less than had been budgeted for, allowing an extension of the pier by about 100 feet (30 m) over the original plan and the addition of water and electrical services.

The pier is composed of a 124-foot (38 m) floating barge, anchored to the seabed, at the center of the structure for embarking passengers onto ships, with the remainder a gangway wide enough to accommodate vehicles the size of a golf cart. The gangway is supported by individual pilings and clusters of three pilings. The pier is able to accommodate ships as large as 1,200 feet (370 m) long.
