= WEX Inc. =

Payment processing & information management service company

- Company type: Public
- Traded as: NYSE: WEX; S&P 400 Component
- ISIN: US96208T1043
- Industry: Business Services
- Founded: 1983 as Wright Express Corp.
- Headquarters: Portland, Maine, United States
- Key people: Melissa D. Smith (President, Director, & CEO); Michael E. Dubyak (Chairman of the Board)> Roberto Simon (CFO)
- Products: Fleet cards, corporate payments, virtual card.
- Revenue: ▲US$ 1.54 billion (2020 FY)
- Operating income: ▲US$ 239.27 million (2017)
- Net income: ▲US$ 160.27 million (2017)
- Total assets: ▲US$ 6.739 billion (2017)
- Total equity: ▲US$ 1.72 billion (2017)
- Number of employees: 3,500 (2017)
- Website: www.wexinc.com

WEX Inc. is a provider of payment processing and information management services to the United States commercial and government vehicle fleet industry. The company is headquartered in Portland, Maine and provides services in the United States, Canada, South America, Europe, Asia, and Australia.

== History ==
Previous logo

The company traces its origins to A.R. Wright, a coal and later heating oil business in South Portland, Maine. In the 1980s, A.R. Wright began allowing trucks to fuel up without having to pay an attendant by using a post-paid fuel card, leading to the creation of Wright Express Corporation in 1983.

SafeCard purchased Wright Express Corp. in 1994. On February 20, 1996, CUC International acquired SafeCard (now renamed to Ideon) for $375 million. Following CUC's merger with HFS, Wright Express became part of Cendant.

Wright Express went public in 2005. In 2012, it adopted the name WEX, signaling a shift away from focusing on fuel cards and expanding into other payment solutions.

In 2019, WEX opened a new 100,000-square-foot headquarters across from the Ocean Gateway International Marine Passenger Terminal in Portland, Maine. The company continues to have a significant presence in South Portland. WEX is one of 10 founding corporate partners of the Roux Institute at Northeastern University, which leases a portion of the WEX headquarters for its campus.

== Operations ==
WEX Fleet provides vehicle fleet customers with fuel cards and data and telematics offerings for drivers. In 2012, WEX Fleet acquired Fleet One to provide fleet cards to drivers. WEX Fleet also partners with GasBuddy, OnDeck Capital, and Chevron, among other companies, to provide services to customers. In 2017, WEX Fleet launched a new telematics platform, ClearView Advanced.

The travel segment, WEX Virtual, helps online travel agencies facilitate cross-border payments through virtual cards, allowing online travel agencies to automate back-end accounting practices. WEX Virtual launched in 2000 in support of customers including HitchHiker, HotelTonight, Expedia, and Priceline.

In 2014, WEX acquired Evolution1, a cloud-based health industry payments provider, later renaming it to WEX Health. WEX Health Cloud helps to administer defined-contribution, wellness, and transit plans, among others. Its partners include Fifth Third Bancorp, Paychex, HSA Bank, and Discovery Benefits.

In January 2020, the company announced it would acquire travel payments companies eNett and Optal from Travelport for $577.5 million.

Melissa D. Smith became CEO of Wex in 2014, with annual revenue nearly tripling during her tenure, as of November 2023. She is known for implementing an aggressive acquisition strategy and investing in early-stage companies. As of 2024, Smith is the highest-paid executive of any public company in Maine.

WEX provides services in the United States, the United Kingdom, Canada, Brazil, New Zealand, and Australia. It also operates the wholly owned banking subsidiary WEX Bank.
