= Peter Bird (rower) =

British rower (1947–1996)

Peter Bird (19 February 1947 – 1996) was a British ocean rower who, in 1983, became the first person to row non-stop and solo across the Pacific from east to west when he completed his journey from America to Australia.

== Atlantic ==
Bird first became interested in ocean rowing in 1968 when he read about the Atlantic crossings by John Fairfax, Chay Blyth and John Ridgway. Then, while selling silk paintings door to door he met Derek King, who had just rowed around Ireland in a small boat. King was planning to row around the world and invited Bird to join. The two only managed to cross the Atlantic however and having run out of money were forced to return home.

== Pacific ==
=== First attempt ===
Bird next decided that he would try to row the Pacific solo. He set off from San Francisco on 23 August 1982, having already failed in one earlier attempt in 1981. 294 days later and within a quarter of a mile of the Great Barrier Reef Bird was rescued by the Australian Navy. However, because of how close he was to land when he received the tow (26 nautical miles) he is widely accepted as the first person to complete the solo, non-stop row across the Pacific from east to west by both the adjudicators for the sport, The Ocean Rowing Society and Guinness World Records.

His partner Polly gave birth to their son, Louis, in December 1991.

=== Second attempt ===
Bird continued to participate in ocean rowing and he later decided to row the Pacific again but in the other direction from Russia to the US. Bird’s luck did not improve and between 1992 and 1995 he made a further four attempts to row solo across the North Pacific Ocean including one attempt extending for 304 days at sea. In 1996 he attempted the route a fifth time and set out from Nakhodka, Russia on 27 March 1996. On 3 June 1996, the Russian Rescue Centre picked up an emergency signal from him. A few hours later Bird's badly damaged boat was found with no sign of him.

Bird, together with Kenneth Crutchlow was a cofounder of the Ocean Rowing Society.

== Legacy ==
In memorial of Peter Bird, Ocean Rowing Society established Peter Bird Trophy, one of 2 Ocean Rowing Awards

Painting of Peter Bird by artist Tatiana Rezvoy is on display at the Royal Geographical Society in London
