= FIT Radio =

American internet radio provider

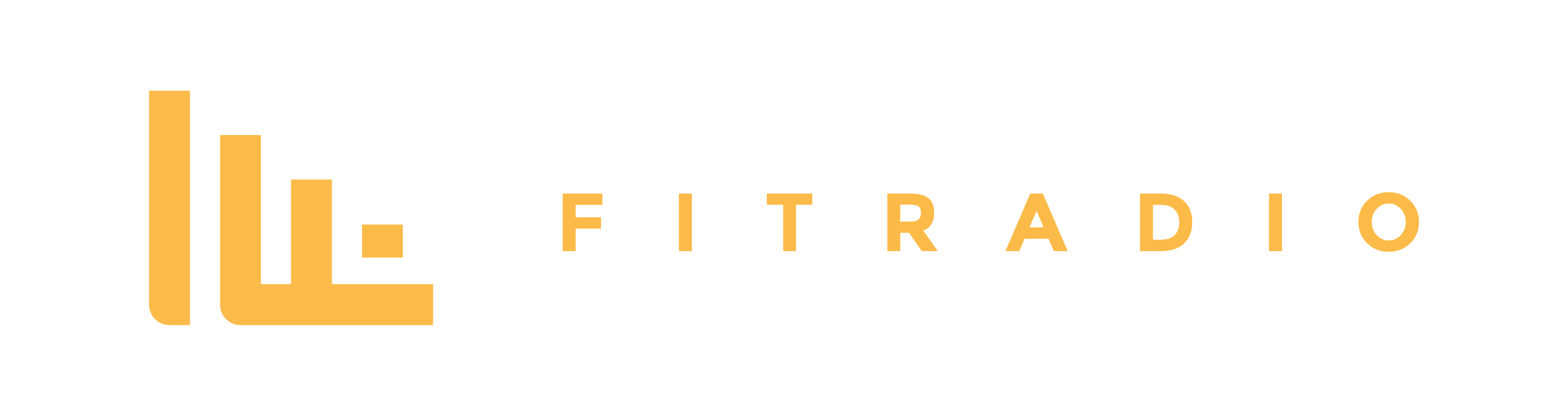
- Industry: Entertainment, software, health and fitness
- Founded: 2011
- Website: fitradio.com

FIT Radio is an American Internet radio provider based in Atlanta and a mobile app that plays continuous music mixes of various genres engineered by DJs. The streaming media content is delivered to users' computers and smartphones. The app is geared towards people who want to listen to high-energy music while they work out. Musical genres include Top 40, hip hop, indie rock, dubstep and house. Through the interface, users can see what artists and songs make up each mix, and they can also bypass songs and mixes entirely.

== History ==
The app was officially launched on June 4, 2011, and is comparable to other Internet providers Pandora and Spotify, though FIT Radio is geared towards a target demographic of people who work out and fitness enthusiasts. The mixes that the app comprises maintain consistent BPM (beats per minute) designed to sustain a high level of energy in both the music and the listeners.

=== Product ===
The app has a free option and is accessible through FITradio.com or through app stores for mobile platforms such as the iPhone and Android. Potential users can also try FIT Radio for 30 days free. FIT Radio also has a premium feature that allows users unlimited access for one year. Once downloaded, users can share mixes through social networking sites such as Facebook and Twitter. The premium version of FIT Radio is commercial-free.

== Features ==
=== Genres ===
As of September 2013, FIT Radio features dozens of different genres of high-energy music. Each genre contains multiple musical mixes that users can access. Subscribers to FIT Radio have the ability to see what tracks each mix comprises, as well as to "jump" from one mix to another. The genres of FIT Radio earned the app the title "Pandora for Gym Rats" by social media news website Mashable.

=== Stations ===
In addition to the genres option, FIT Radio allows users to pick between DJ-engineered stations. Various playlists are designed for different style of workouts, such as 5K, Zumba, and Gym/aerobic exercise. Red Frog Events, including Warrior Dash, and Beach Dash. According to Cosmopolitan UK, stations are updated on a daily basis by over 100 DJs who contribute their mixes to the app.

=== Favorites ===
While, unlike Pandora, the app does not have a search option that enables users to locate a specific song title, with the "Favorites" feature, listeners of FIT Radio can select specific tracks, DJs, mixes, and playlists to favorite.

== Press ==
Forbes Magazine contributor Darren Heitner authored a piece on FIT Radio, entitled "Music Streaming Service Supplies Upbeat Playlists For The Fitness Freak." In the article, he addresses how FIT Radio separates itself from its music-based competitors, by maintaining a consistent BPM (beats per minute). The piece was published in the Sportsmoney section of Forbes on May 25, 2013.

== Controversy ==
In 2018, Warner Bros., Sony, and Capitol Records were among a group of record companies that sued FIT Radio for Copyright infringement.
