= Kenneth Crutchlow =

British adventurer

Kenneth Crutchlow FRGS
- Born: 18 March 1944; London
- Died: 17 January 2016 (aged 71); London
- Occupations: Adventurer, Writer and Entrepreneur
- Known for: Founder and Head of Ocean Rowing Society International

Kenneth Frank Crutchlow, FRGS (18 March 1944 London, 17 January 2016) was a British adventurer, writer and entrepreneur. He was the founder of Ocean Rowing Society International (ORSI), the Head of ORSI and main Ocean Rowing adjudicator for Guinness World Records.

== Adventures ==
- 1958–1965 Active member of Gladstone Warwick Rowing Club, London
- 1965 Lived in and was an active rowing member of Thames Rowing Club, London
- 1965 Started 7 years hitch-hiking journey around the world visiting 60 countries
- 1969 Entrant in Race from Top of Empire State Building (New York) to top of GPO Tower (London)
- 1970 Rode a bicycle from Glendale, Los Angeles to Mexico City – 1755 miles (2824 km)
- 1974 The first person to run across Death Valley (the hottest place on earth, in August – 130 °F (54,44 °C)), from Jubilee Pass to Scotties Castle
- 1975 Swam from Alcatraz to San Francisco at Christmas time
- 1976 Rode a bicycle from London to Dundee, Scotland, swam the Firth of Forth and run to Edinburgh
- 1977 The first person to run 500 miles from Los Angeles to San Francisco
- 1979 Rode bicycle from San Francisco to Ketchikan, Alaska
- 1980 Rode bicycle across Death Valley from Badwater to Las Vegas, Nevada
- 1981 Ran from Badwater in Death Valley, the lowest point in Continental US, to top of Mt. Whitney, the highest point in the contiguous USA
- 1989 Entrant with Mick Cerre of Globe TV in The Global Scavenger Hunt public transport race around the world, San Francisco – San Francisco
- 1991–2000 Technical support of Sector No Limits program

== Founding of Ocean Rowing Society International ==
His involvement in ocean rowing commenced as far back as 1969, when he took the train from NY to Miami on the mission to report the arrival of John Fairfax for a National British newspaper "Daily Sketch". He was involved in the next row of John Fairfax and Sylvia Cook across the Pacific (1971), was one of the major sponsors of the rows of Peter Bird across the Pacific (1980, 1982).

In 1980 Kenneth for the first time used ARGOS satellite beacons to track the row of Peter Bird across the Pacific Ocean from Russian Far East to San Francisco; and hence, after launching the website, ORSI became the first to start monitoring and tracking rowers at sea, listing positions, plotting charts and posting them - along with the press articles, news and other information about and from rowers at sea, making it available to public.

From 1983, when he founded the ORSI, Kenneth dedicated himself to documenting attempts to row the oceans, and with the assistance of his wife Tatiana, provided Guinness World Records with the ratification needed for record-breaking rows.

Kenneth was the first to organize a resupply of an ocean rower on route (Peter Bird, Pacific Ocean 1983) and then organized and participated in several resupplies of rowers and teams at sea - sailing and flying, or coordinating a meeting with a vessel or even another rowboat. He was an associate producer of the film called "The Longest Row". The film won Grand Prix prize at La Plan (France) Adventure Film Festival. In 1985 Kenneth became Fellow of the Royal Geographical Society, London. In 1997 he formally registered Ocean Rowing Society in London. In 1997, at the start of the first ocean rowing race from Canary Islands to Barbados, an American Tom Lynch, - a friend of Kenneth Crutchlow and of then later Peter Bird, - launched the website of ORSI. In 2003 Kenneth launched new design of ORSI ocean rowboat ("Ukraine", "Queensgate", "Macmillan Spirit"). He later organized several Black Tie Dinners for Ocean Rowers.

== Release of prisoners in Vietnam ==
Richard Knight was the leader of the expedition looking for treasure allegedly been buried by the 17th century pirate Captain Kidd. The expedition members were arrested on June 16, 1983, by Vietnamese authorities, and kept in a provincial prison at Kien Giang. The Vietnamese government officially reported to British officials that they were holding the pair on September 1. The boat and all their equipment were confiscated.

The families of prisoners said they did not have the money to pay the fines and appealed for their release on humanitarian grounds. The Vietnamese government, however, insisted that the provincial court's ruling stood and the amounts had to be paid. The Vietnamese indicated they expected the British and American governments to come up with the money, but both refused on grounds it would set a bad precedent. One diplomat complained "The Vietnamese think we are a charity." The fine, he said, "is essentially a ransom."

Knight, who had been unable to raise the money for his release, was still held. Knight had raised only $2,000 and was said to have been suffering from severe depression. Crutchlow heard of the capture of Knight and donated $8,000 (today $25,000) for Knight's release. Knight was released on August 20, after Kenneth's lengthy correspondence with Vietnamese Authorities.

While Knight was released in 1984, the two Thai boatman who accompanied them remained in captivity. They were finally released after 44 months in captivity when Crutchlow paid the bail to Vietnamese Embassy in Bangkok. Crutchlow said it was his "duty as an Englishman" to help them. "It was an Englishman who got them into Vietnam. If he wasn't going to help them, then there had to be an Englishman who could." Crutchlow planned to sell one of his London-style taxicabs to pay for the fine.

== Death Valley to Mount Whitney Challenge ==
1987 was the first year that the official Badwater Ultramarathon was run, on a 146-mile course from Death Valley to Mount Whitney. The previous year, Tom Crawford and Mike Witwer had attempted to organise an official race but it was cancelled when the insurance policy was rescinded. So the two of them ran the course, completing it in 70 hours and 27 minutes. After reading about it in the San Francisco Chronicle, Kenneth Crutchlow challenged Crawford and Witwer to a team race: Crutchlow and a partner, representing Britain, versus the American pair. Crutchlow put an ad in Athletics Weekly to find a teammate and Eleanor Robinson, at the time considered the best female ultra runner in the world, was the only person to respond. Witwer pulled out.

== Enterprise ==
Crutchlow imported a fleet of London black taxis to Sonoma County, California, and established a cab firm there.

== Writing ==
Crutchlow researched and documented lives of many today notable, but prior to his work little known ocean rowers.

== Personal life ==
He married Ukrainian artist, Tatiana Rezvaya. They lived in London.

== Obituary ==
Guinness World Records published an obituary letter commemorating Kenneth's death, ending with words: “He’ll be sadly missed by everyone here at GWR."

On the same note The Global Scavenger Hunt program stated: "His curious and boisterous spirit was exhibited front and center from the moment you met him.....You couldn’t not like him."
