= Beach Dash =

Obstacle racing event

- Genre: Adventure Race
- Frequency: Recurring
- Location: United States
- Years active: 2
- Inaugurated: 2010
- Most recent: November 5, 2011

Beach Dash is a 5K obstacle race on a beach that was formerly run by Red Frog Events. The rights to the name and race were sold to an Australian event company because of its failure in the United States.

As of 2013 the name is also used by an event in Mustang Island, Texas which also includes longer distances and a children's race.

== Founding ==
Beach Dash was launched on November 13, 2010 in Daytona Beach, Florida by Red Frog Events, who also puts on Great Urban Race and Warrior Dash. This first race in the series encouraged Red Frog Events to plan five more races throughout the United States.

== Locations ==
Location	Location	Date
Boulder, CO	Boulder Reservoir	6/11/11
Chicago, IL	Montrose Beach	7/30/11
Galveston, TX	East Beach	9/24/11
Long Beach, CA	Long Beach	10/1/11
St. Pete Beach, FL	St. Pete Beach	11/5/11
Long Beach, CA	Marina Green Park	6/16/12

== Race details ==
Beach Dash is a 5K obstacle course and festival hosted on a beach. Each participant is given a race bib, timing chip and pineapple hat. Beach Dash merchandise is available for purchase online but not on site.

Each race has between 9 and 12 obstacles that vary depending on the course. Waves occur each half-hour and wave capacity varies depending on the location. Costumes are encouraged although there are no recognized teams.

== Post-race festivities ==
A post-race festival for runners and spectators occurs at each race. The party includes music, games, food and drink. It is free to spectators, and includes spectator viewing areas often located near the final obstacles. A large bonfire is built on the sand towards the end of the race (venue permitting) and various beach games such as cornhole and ladder golf are available to play.

== Awards ==
Every Beach Dash concludes with an awards ceremony that recognizes:

- Top three male and female overall receive customized Beach Dash skim boards
- Top three male and female runners in each age group receive engraved conch shells
- Best costume award varies, often a gift basket with beach items
