= OnDeck Capital =

American financial services company

OnDeck Capital, Inc.
- Type: Subsidiary
- Traded as: NYSE: ENVA
- Industry: Financial services
- Genre: Financial Technology
- Founded: 2006; 20 years ago
- Founder: Mitch Jacobs
- Headquarters: Chicago, Illinois, United States
- Key people: Steve Cunningham (CEO)
- Products: Small Business Loans, including Term Loans and Lines of Credit
- Revenue: $291.3 million (2016)
- Parent: Enova International www.enova.com
- Website: www.ondeck.com

OnDeck Capital is an American small business lending company with offices in Chicago, IL; New York, NY; Denver, CO, and South Jordan, UT. OnDeck provides its loans exclusively online and uses proprietary software to aggregate data about a business’ operations, which is processed by an algorithm that determines loan eligibility.

== History ==
Mitch Jacobs founded OnDeck in 2006 and headquartered the company in New York City. Jacobs sought funding from venture capital companies, with early investors including First Round Capital, Khosla Ventures, Village Ventures, Contour Venture Partners, RRE Ventures, SAP Ventures (now Sapphire Ventures), Google Ventures and Tiger Global Management.

In 2007, the company introduced its short-term loan product and made its first loan, and by early 2010, the company had made over $50M in loans to small businesses in the U.S.

Jacobs left OnDeck in 2012, and Noah Breslow became the company's CEO. OnDeck completed its IPO in December 2014 and became listed on the New York Stock Exchange under the symbol ONDK, raising $230 million in the offering. In 2015, the company expanded its operations into Canada and Australia, the latter operating as OnDeck Capital Australia Pty Ltd in partnership with MYOB.

In July 2020, OnDeck was acquired by Chicago consumer lender Enova International.

== Partnerships ==
In June 2016, JPMorgan Chase made a deal with OnDeck to offer an online lending process to its small business customers. The bank uses OnDeck’s origination and loan servicing technology to supply small businesses with same or next-day funding. JPMorgan Chase and OnDeck announced an extension of their collaboration in August 2017. The JPMorgan Chase partnership ended in July 2019.

OnDeck’s referral partners include Intuit QuickBooks, Angie’s List, Prosper Marketplace, Credit Karma, and WEX Inc.

OnDeck is a founding member of the Innovative Lending Platform Association (ILPA), a trade organization representing online lending and service companies that serve small businesses. In 2016, the ILPA, in partnership with the Association for Enterprise Opportunity, launched The SMART Box, a “model small business pricing disclosure...focused on empowering small businesses to better assess and compare finance options.”

OnDeck also partners with SCORE, an American non-profit that provides small businesses with free advice and mentors.

== Criticisms ==
OnDeck Capital has been criticised for its high interest rates. In 2015, its average loan had an annual 51% interest rate. In 2014, Bloomberg BusinessWeek called OnDeck "payday lending for businesses", relying on brokers who were "less-than-scrupulous."

== Awards ==
- Crain’s New York Business Fast 50, 2013, 2014, 2015, 2016
- Forbes’ America’s Most Promising Companies, 2014
