= Ocean Rowing Society International =

Governing body for international ocean rowing

- Sport: Ocean Rowing
- Jurisdiction: Worldwide
- Abbreviation: ORSI
- Founded: 1983 by Kenneth Crutchlow
- Headquarters: United Kingdom
- Director: Tatiana Rezvaya-Crutchlow

Official website
- www.oceanrowing.com

Ocean Rowing Society International (ORSI) (prior to 2006 known as ORS), is the governing body for international ocean rowing and official adjudicator of ocean rowing records for Guinness World Records. ORSI was founded in 1983 in California by ocean rower Peter Bird and Kenneth F.Crutchlow FRGS. Current coordinators of ORSI are Tatiana Rezvaya-Crutchlow and Chris Martin, and Fiann Paul.

== History ==
The Ocean Rowing Society (from 2006 – International) was founded in 1983 by Kenneth Frank Crutchlow, with support of an ocean rower Peter Bird. The reason, that urged them to do it, was a letter from a French journalist, asking if there existed a list of British ocean rowers. He was writing about the row of French Gerard d'Aboville and wondered how to compare it to the achievements of the other ocean rowers. The main goal of the Society was and still is to keep record of all attempts to row across the oceans.

In 1983, after almost 90 years since the first ocean row in history, there had been only 32 attempts to row an ocean, and only 14 of them had been successful. The Ocean Rowing Society completed full and accurate information about all and each of them, to verify and to classify every row in the pre-Internet era. And since then, ORS has been the only body that keeps records of all events in the field of ocean rowing activity. The Ocean Rowing Society Int. is an official adjudicator of ocean rowing records for the Guinness World Records.

D. H. Clarke from Guinness World Records in 1964 pioneered recording of ocean rows. He handed over to Kenneth Crutchlow all his notes that laid the basis for the statistics. And ocean rowers Geoff Allum and Mike Nestor, who provided ORS with their records and numerous cuttings from press articles, and helped with the compiling of the first list of the statistics. In 2000 Tom Lynch, an American Director of ORS, handed over the maintenance of the website to Ukrainian Theodore Rezvoy, who has designed website's current interface and created logo of ORS, placing there a saying in Latin. It expresses the inner motto of this extreme adventure: "Nosce Te Ipsum" – Know Thyself. "Know yourself, test yourself, challenge yourself and succeed – the greatest victory for an individual, that's what all this is about."

In 2001 Tatiana Rezvaya-Crutchlow, became and still is the Editor-in-Chief of the ORS website. She is in charge of maintaining and updating the general statistics, as well as compiling its various options, selected by the aspect of the route, category, class, age, gender, country, duration, etc. In 1980 Kenneth for the first time used ARGOS satellite beacons to track the row of Peter Bird across the Pacific Ocean from Russian Far East to San Francisco; and hence, after launching the website, ORS became the first to start monitoring and tracking rowers at sea, listing positions, plotting charts and posting them – along with the press articles, news and other information about and from rowers at sea, – making it available to public.

ORS has coordinated dozens of rows of individuals and in 2004 organized the first race with Solos and Four entrees (besides traditional Teams of Two – that had been the only class of entrees in races 1997, 2001 and 2003). It was then, that ORS introduced a convenient way of tracking numerous boats on one chart on the webpage, by marking them as dots of different colors – the way adopted later by organizers of other races. ORS has been one of the first contacts in the list of the Coast Guards, when it goes about rescue at sea of independent rowers. It assists by providing/confirming the necessary data, positions, contacts, etc. Kenneth F.Crutchlow was the first to organize a resupply of an ocean rower on route (Peter Bird, Pacific Ocean 1983) and then organized and participated in several resupplies of rowers and teams at sea – sailing and flying, or coordinating a meeting with a vessel or even another rowboat. ORSI organized the first meeting of entries in the 1997 race and in 2002 – meeting with all women-ocean rowers, at the Royal Geographical Society in London. It also organized lunches for ocean rowers with representatives of Guinness World Records on the occasions of awarding Guinness certificates to ocean rowers.

In 2000 ORS formed a committee of ocean rowers who prepared "guidelines" for those who might themselves want to accept the Challenge of an Ocean Row. There was established a record "Blue Riband Trophy of Ocean Rowing", to be presented to the holders of the record "The fastest row across the Atlantic East to West along the "Trade Winds I", – the most popular and rowed route of all in the world oceans. In 2017 Blue Riband Trophy was divided into two classes: classic and open. In 2003 ORS came up with an idea of organizing free seminars, where ocean rowers, coast guard helicopter pilots, psychologists, specialists in survival at sea shared their experience with those who were planning or about to go to sea. ORS sees as its task to keep alive and honor names of the past ocean rowers. A number of ocean rowboats related to the pioneers of ocean rowing have been saved from destruction, exhibited at several boat shows and finally presented to the relevant museums and organizations. In 2006 ORS became ORSI.

In 2021 Fiann Paul developed a geodatabase that documents and processes the entire history of human-power ocean-exploration, dubbed by Guinness World Records “The first real adventure database”. This database became the new ORSI website.

== Coordinators ==
ORSI is led by coordinators. The following list gives main coordinators since 1983:

- 1983 – 2016: Kenneth F. Crutchlow
- 2016 – present: Tatiana Rezvaya-Crutchlow
- 2016 – present: Chris Martin
- 2019 – present: Fiann Paul

== See also ==
- International Rowing Federation
- Human-powered watercraft
- World Sailing
