= Ocean Gateway International Marine Passenger Terminal =

Cruise ship terminal in Portland, Maine, US

Coordinates: 43°39′35″N 70°14′47″W

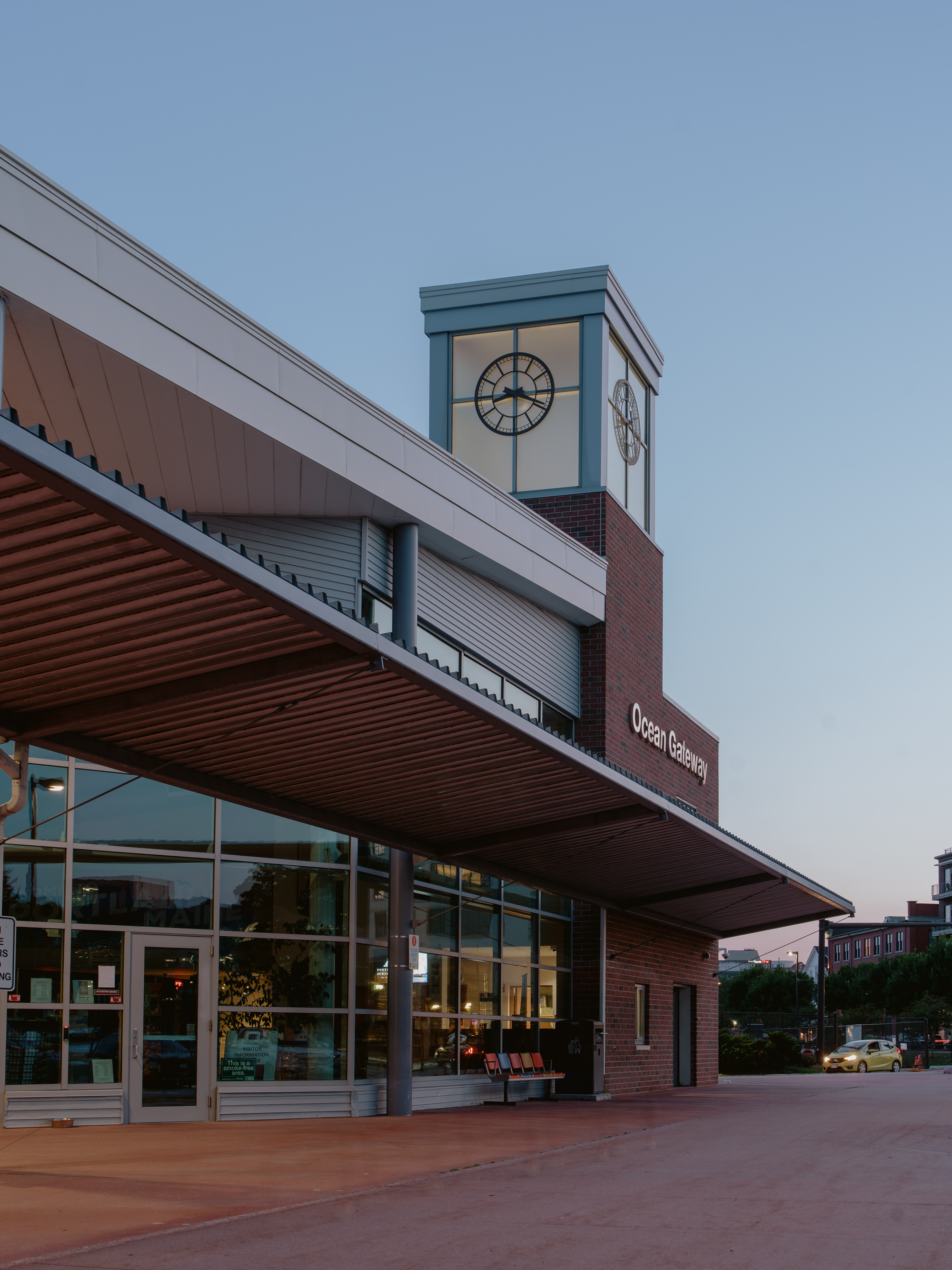

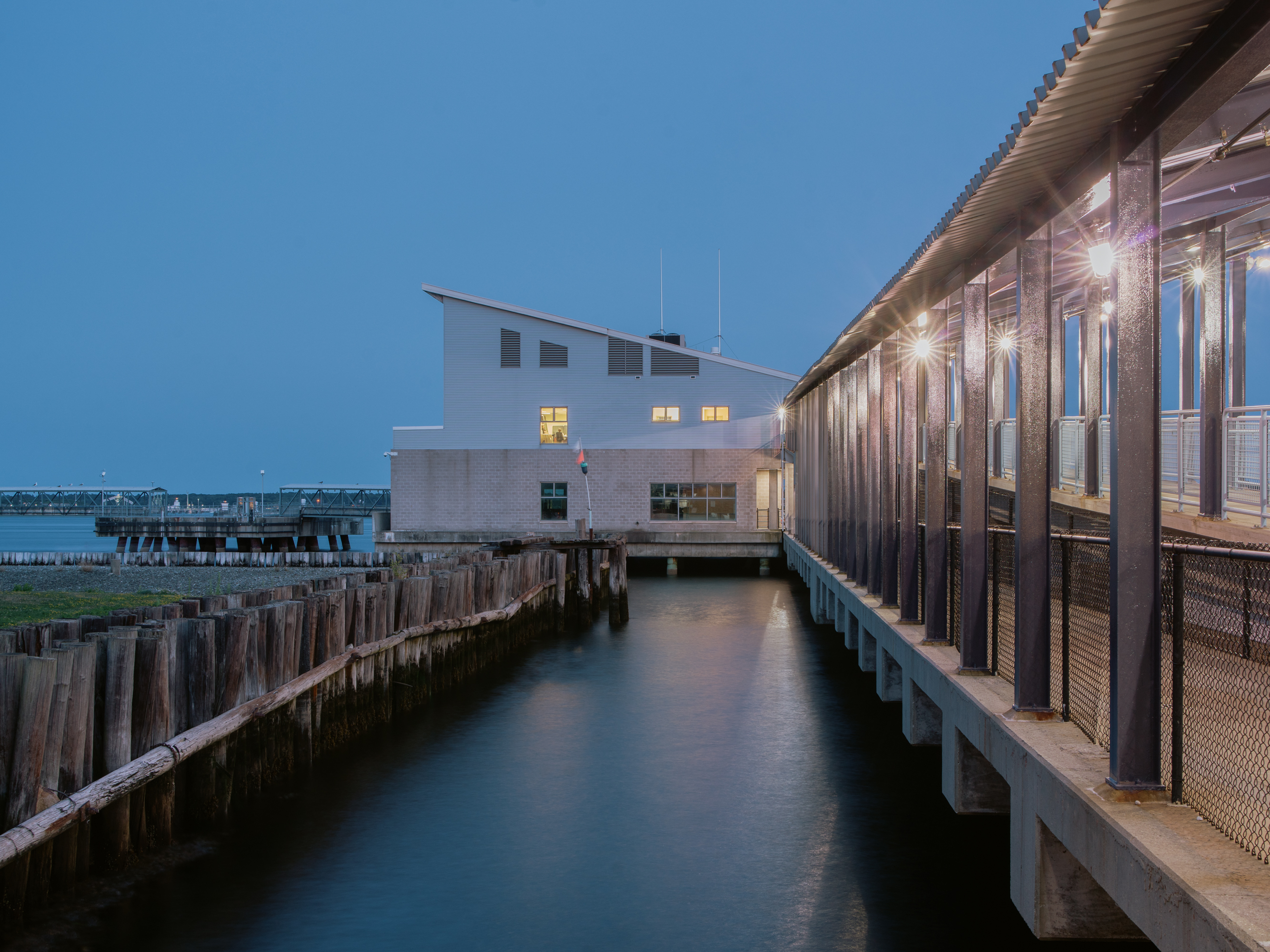

The Ocean Gateway International Marine Passenger Terminal is a cruise ship terminal in Portland, Maine, United States. It was built in two phases: Phase 1 being a new terminal building that in 2008 replaced the original "International Marine Terminal" and phase 2 being a new berth and docking facility for large cruise ships known as Ocean Gateway Pier II.

Plans for the new passenger terminal were made as early as 2003, when the Portland city council presented an early design for the facility, including two buildings — a 5,000-square-foot (460 m^{2}) receiving building and a 16,000-square-foot (1,500 m^{2}) terminal building — built at the end of a pier. Construction began in September 2005, after the Reed and Reed construction company won the contract in June.

The main terminal building is built over the water, and is a two-story structure, with customs facilities for international passengers on the first floor and a waiting area on the second. The terminal building is connected to the receiving building, located about 300 feet (90 m) away on shore, by a pair of pedestrian ramps. In addition to the receiving building, shore facilities include a 3.5-acre (1.4 ha) parcel of land for parking cars and boarding buses, both local and tour.

Building the terminal facility cost about $20.5 million, of which $9 million came from a bond issue by the state of Maine, $6 million from the federal government and the remainder from a mix of local, state and federal sources.

The building was formally opened on 2 May 2008 in a ceremony attended by about 200 people. Commercial shipping traffic began calling at the facility on 30 May, when The Cat, operated by Bay Ferries, began its seasonal service to Yarmouth, Nova Scotia.

Ocean Gateway is also used as rental venue for functions such as weddings, conventions and other public events, a use which grew in importance after The Cat service was canceled following the 2009 season, which meant a loss to the city of Portland of $150,000 per year in rent which Bay Ferries paid for use of the facility. The city estimated that rentals brought in about $90,000 a year since the ferry service ended.

The second phase of the terminal project is Ocean Gateway Pier II, a deep-water pier for large cruise ships that opened in September 2011, allowing more and larger cruise ships to dock in the city.
