= Agilysys =

Hospitality software company

Agilysys Inc.
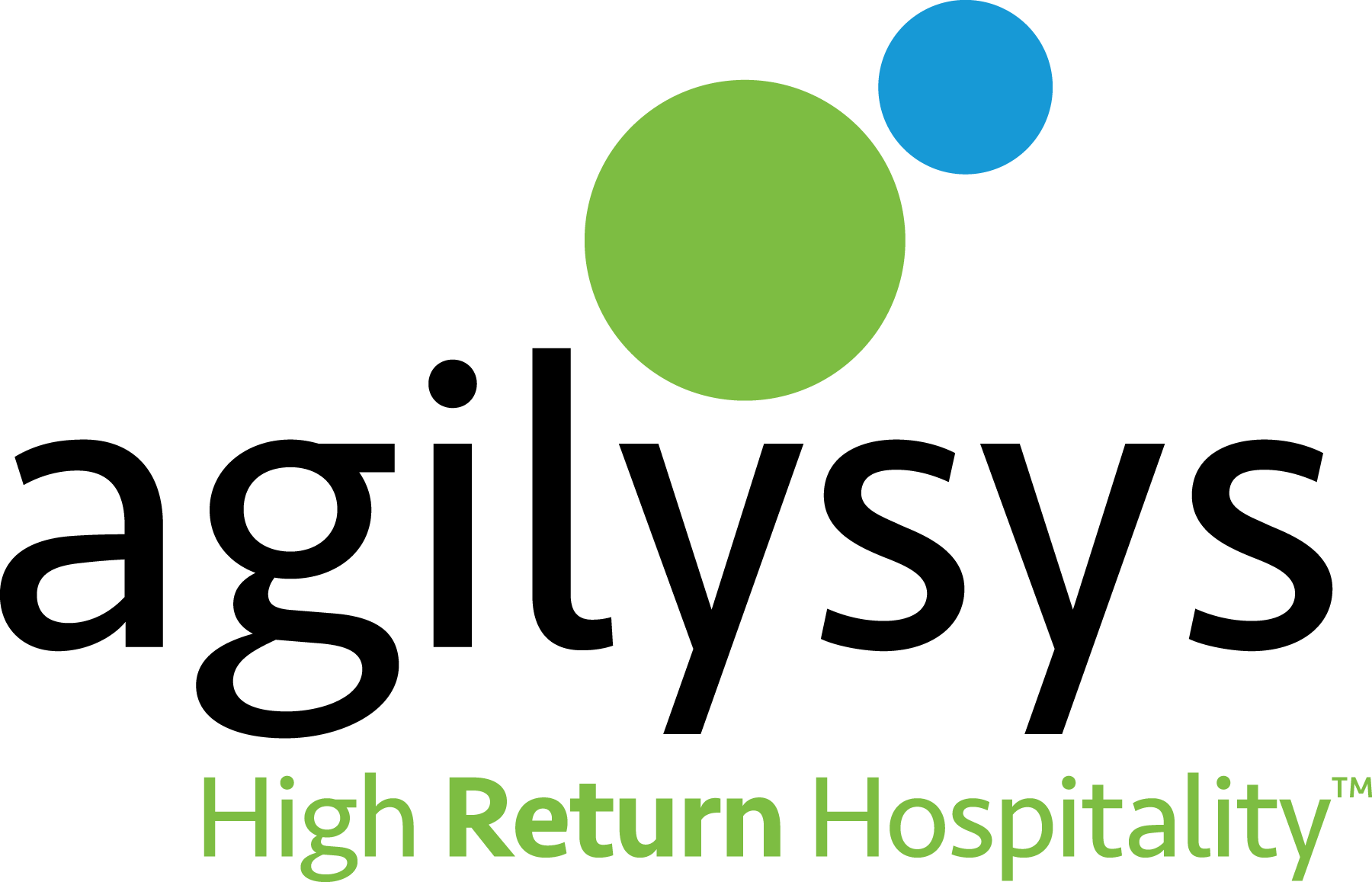
- Formerly: Pioneer-Standard Electronics
- Type: Public
- Traded as: Nasdaq: AGYS; S&P 600 component
- Industry: Hospitality Software
- Founded: 1963; 63 years ago
- Headquarters: Alpharetta, Georgia, United States
- Services: Hospitality PMS; Hospitality POS
- Website: www.agilysys.com

Agilysys Inc. is an American software company that develops and markets proprietary enterprise software and other products for the hospitality industry. The company specializes in point of sale, property management, inventory and procurement, document management, workforce management, and mobile and wireless products.

Agilysys operates throughout North America, Europe and Asia. It has corporate services located in Alpharetta, Georgia, EMEA headquarters in Windsor, UK, and offices in Singapore, Hong Kong, Malaysia and Chennai covering Asia and the Pacific.

== History ==
The company was founded in Ohio in 1963 as Pioneer-Standard Electronics, Inc., following a merger of Pioneer Electronics Supply of Cleveland and Standard Radio Supply of Dayton.

By 1996, it was the sixth-largest supplier of industrial electronics in the United States. It had moved beyond parts distribution to consulting and specialized product development for the computer hardware and software industries.

In 2003, the company changed its name to Agilysys.

== See also ==
- List of S&P 600 companies
