= DW Practice =

American technology company

DW Practice, LLC
- Company type: Private Company
- Industry: IT Services
- Founded: 1998
- Headquarters: Atlanta, Georgia, United States
- Area served: Worldwide

DW Practice, LLC is an Atlanta-based provider of information technology services. The company offers services related to enterprise data management, application development, product engineering, QA and testing and managed services. DW Practice has offices and "solution delivery centers" across the US and India. Data warehousing and business intelligence, application development, big data, cloud computing and mobile technologies are the key focus areas for DW Practice. The company has strategic partnerships with IBM, Microsoft, and Oracle.

== Services ==
DW Practice's core service offerings include:

- Enterprise Data Management
- Enterprise Application Management
- QA and Testing
- Product Engineering
- Managed Services

== Technology solutions ==
- Data Warehousing and business intelligence
- Big Data
- Cloud Computing
- Mobility
- Microsoft Solutions
- IBM Solutions
- Oracle Solutions

== Global locations ==
- USA – Atlanta (GA), Glendale (CA), Princeton (NJ)
- India – Hyderabad, Bangalore
