= Terminus (office complex) =

Business and residential complex in Georgia, US

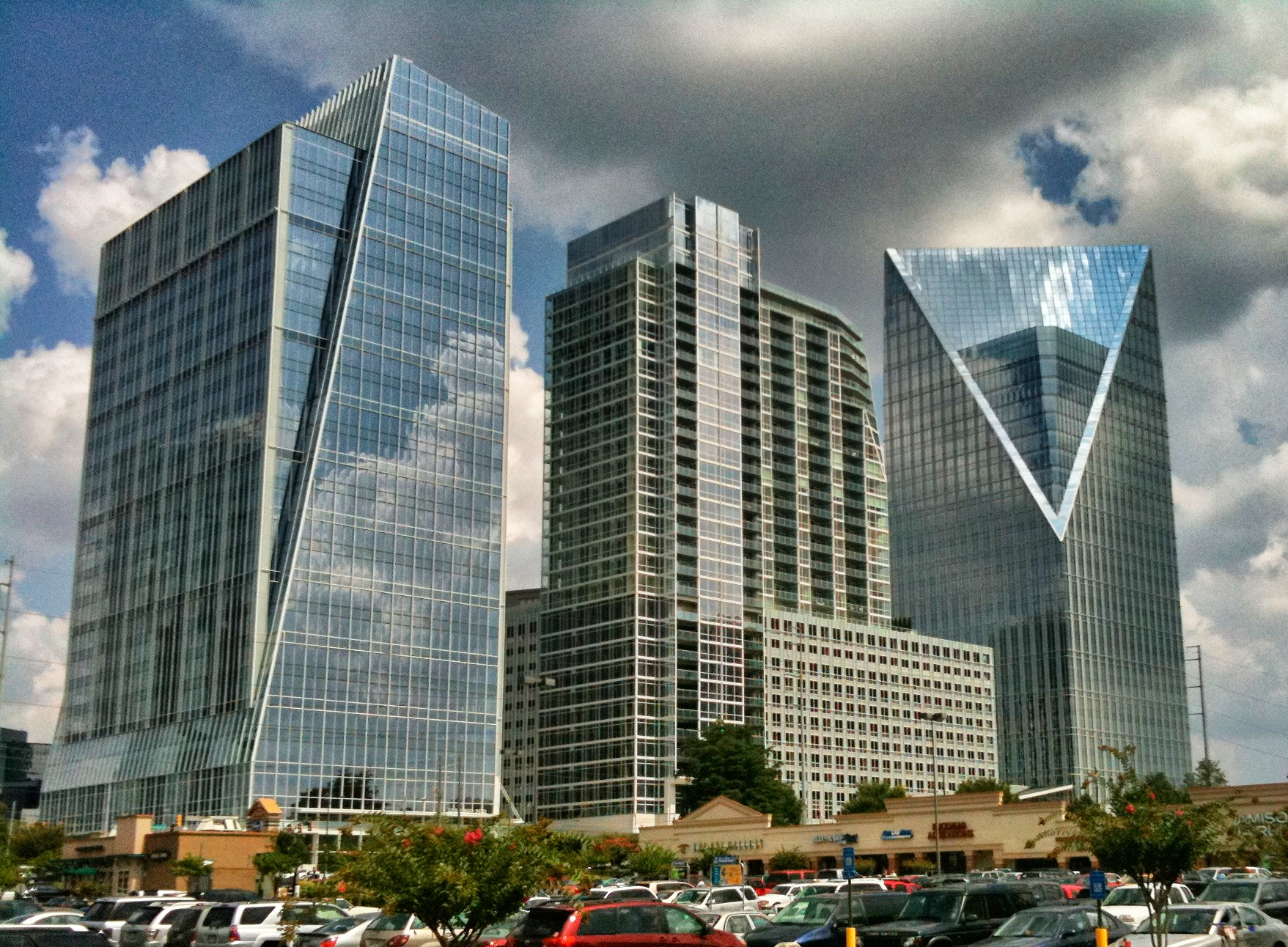
- View of the entire Terminus complex in Buckhead
- Interactive map of the Terminus area

General information
- Status: Completed
- Type: Mixed-use complex (Office, residential, retail)
- Architectural style: Modernist / Postmodernist
- Location: Peachtree Road & Piedmont Road, Buckhead, United States
- Coordinates: 33.8441°N 84.3715°W
- Opened: 2007 (Terminus 100)

Design and construction
- Architects: Duda Paine Architects (design); HKS Architects (record)
- Developer: Cousins Properties
- Main contractor: Holder Construction

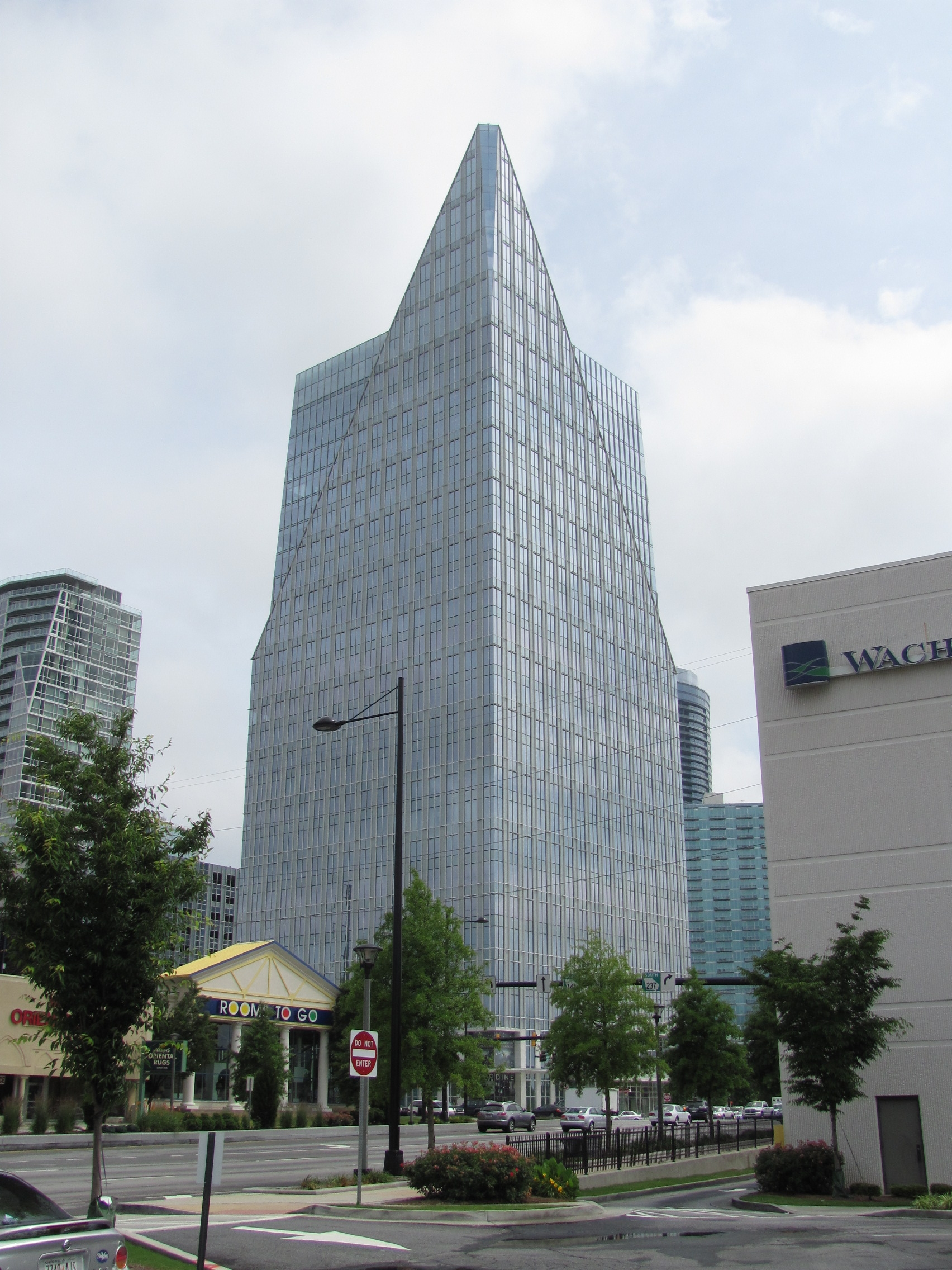
Terminus 100

Terminus is a business and residential complex located in Buckhead, Atlanta, Georgia. The office component of the district is made up of Terminus 200 and Terminus 100. Terminus 100, at the corner of Peachtree Road and Piedmont Road, is the tallest building in Terminus at 485 ft (148 m) tall, and is the 18th-tallest building in Atlanta. Terminus 200 was completed in 2009 and features 25 floors. 10 Terminus Place, the residential component of the complex, is a condominium tower with 32 floors. The name "Terminus" derives from Atlanta's original name, derived from the city's founding as the southeastern terminus for the Western & Atlantic Railroad, although the city was never officially named this.

== Complex Components ==
The mixed-use district consists of three primary structures:

- Terminus 100: A 27-story office tower standing at 485 ft (148 m) tall, completed in 2007.
- Terminus 200: A 25-story Class-A commercial office tower completed in 2009.
- 10 Terminus Place: A 32-story residential condominium skyscraper housing luxury units.

== Tenants ==
- PGi

== See also ==
- List of tallest buildings in Atlanta
