= NexTraq =

NexTraq is a fleet tracking company based in Atlanta, Georgia, United States. Acquired by Francisco Partners in 2009, NexTraq provides Global Positioning System (GPS) vehicle management and fleet tracking. The NexTraq Fleet Tracking platform (formerly MARCUS) is a cloud-based application used by service and distribution businesses to manage fleet operations. Its reporting functionality provides key performance indicators (KPIs).

On Oct 30, 2013, NexTraq was acquired by FleetCor Technologies, Inc.

On June 14, 2017, it was announced that Michelin acquired the company.
