= Ftrans =

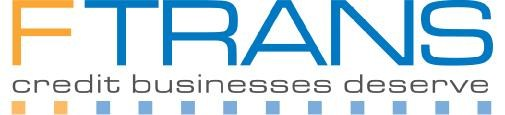
- Type: Private
- Industry: Financial services
- Founded: Atlanta, Georgia, U.S., 2004
- Headquarters: 1000 Abernathy Rd, Suite 1010; Atlanta, Georgia 30328, USA
- Products: Collateral Monitoring; Commercial & Industrial Lending
- Website: http://www.ftrans.net/

Ftrans Corp. is an Atlanta, GA based provider of technology enabled collateral monitoring services to banks for monitoring their commercial and industrial loan portfolios. Founded in 2004, Ftrans provides commercial lending services to banks and receivables services to bank clients (borrowers) in the United States. Ftrans was listed on the Inc. 500 list of the fastest growing private companies in the United States in 2009 and on the Inc. 5000 list in 2010, and was ranked 13th in the Financial Services category after posting 718% growth in 2009.

== Products ==
Ftrans provides commercial loan collateral monitoring to C&I lenders. Ftrans Monitoring enables lenders to offer working capital loans to small to mid-size businesses with light monitoring capability by providing a web-based view of the borrower's working capital collateral. Ftrans Advanced bridges the gap between lightly monitored C&I lending and asset-based lending characterized by intensive monitoring. Ftrans also provides third-party servicing of SBA 7(a) CAPLine programs. Through its direct funding division, AdvancedAR, Ftrans provides commercial and industrial small business funding.

== Technologies ==
Ftrans’ software as a service based platform is based on current Microsoft .NET technologies. The software provides a real time interactive platform for Ftrans personnel to provide replacement services for major functions within the business.

== Partners ==
Ftrans works with a variety of institutions to provide small business funding to clients. In 2007, Ftrans partnered with Synovus Financial Corp. to provide receivables best practices to small businesses to provide sufficient verification of their collateral to secure financing.

== Clients ==
Ftrans serves more than 150 clients in a wide variety of B2B industries who in turn serve more than 10,000 active customers. Ftrans' clients range from small sole-proprietor companies to fast-growing mid-sized companies with more than $500,000 in annual sales, including businesses that do not have hard assets to use as collateral. To date, Ftrans has processed more than $600 million in accounts receivable for its clients.
