= Oversight Systems =

American fraud detection software company

- Company type: Private
- Industry: Compliance software; fraud detection; analytics
- Founded: 2003
- Headquarters: Atlanta, Georgia, United States
- Products: Compliance and fraud-detection software
- Owners: TCV (majority); Luminate Capital Partners (minority)
- Website: www.oversight.com

Oversight Systems is a U.S.-based company that develops and markets computer software that is intended to help businesses identify employee and vendor fraud, misuse and errors with expense reporting and billing. The software also helps public companies with the monitoring and testing of controls associated with the Sarbanes-Oxley Act and the Foreign Corrupt Practices Act (FCPA) compliance. It was founded in 2003 in the US state of Georgia and in its early days was based at the Advanced Technology Development Center business incubator in Atlanta. As of 2024 its headquarters remain in Atlanta.

Oversight Systems' software is intended to detect payments to suspicious vendors and alert authorities when insufficient people are involved in complicated business processes. If a transaction or associated entity is in violation of a given policy, a report is generated and the workflow system transmits the report via e-mail, the user interface and periodic reports.

Oversight's claimed target customers are companies taking in US$600 million or more in yearly revenue.

In 2016 Oversight received funding from the venture capital firm Luminate Capital Partners. On September 2, 2020 Oversight was acquired by TCV, with Luminate Capital Partners retaining a minority equity partnership.
