= MFG.com =

E-commerce manufacturing website

MFG.com, Inc.
- Type: Private
- Industry: Manufacturing; Global Sourcing, Contract Manufacturing
- Headquarters: Marietta, Georgia, U.S.
- Area served: Worldwide
- Products: Manufacturing Marketplace
- Parent: Shapeways (2022-present)
- Website: mfg.com

MFG.com is a global e-commerce manufacturing marketplace that connects buyers of custom manufactured parts with manufacturers that provide contract manufacturing services. It is headquartered in Marietta, Georgia, USA, and maintains an office in Paris, France.

Buyers are typically engineers and purchasers from major corporations, industrial designers, and other sourcing professionals who post requests for quotes (RFQs) to the marketplace. RFQs then receive quotes from qualified contract manufacturers located around the world.

== History ==
MFG.com was founded by Mitch Free in 1999. The first site transaction between a custom parts buyer and custom parts manufacturer took place on February 14, 2000. Coined the 'Valentine Parts Order,' Free bootstrapped & grew the company to a profitable business over 4 years. In 2005, MFG.com accepted an investment from Jeff Bezos of Bezos Expeditions. In June 2006, MFG.com acquired Geneva based SourcingParts.com, a SaaS company focused on building advanced supplier relationship solutions for the made-to-order parts community.

In October 2006, the MFG.com Global Manufacturing Marketplace opened its second largest office in Shanghai, which closed in 2015 for business realignment. In 2007, Samwer Brothers invested in the company, followed by Fidelity Ventures' $26M investment in 2008. Members of Bezos Expeditions and Fidelity Ventures currently sit on the MFG.com board of directors. In September 2012, General Wesley Clark joined the board as an advisory board member. In 2013 founder Mitch Free left MFG.com to pursue other entrepreneurial interests.

MFG.com was named by Business 2.0 in 2006 as one of the 15 companies that will change the world. In 2017, MFG.com was named to SupplyChainBrain's Top 100 Great Supply Chain Partner List

In 2022, MFG.com was acquired by Shapeways.

== Business Model ==
Buyers of Custom Manufactured Parts

Engineers and sourcing professionals use MFG.com to source custom manufactured parts, as well as find and connect with contract manufacturers and manufacturing job shops around the world. Buyers upload their requests for quotation (RFQs) online and connect with suppliers that meet their specific manufacturing specifications. Buyers have the ability to connect with job shops and contract manufacturers based on geographic location, certifications, and manufacturing capabilities. Buyers can also request job shops and contract manufacturers sign electronic non-disclosure agreement (NDA) forms so that they can control how, when, where, and by whom their drawings and documents are viewed.

Engineers and sourcing professionals can source custom parts in categories such as:

- Assembly
- Casting
- Extrusion
- Fabrication
- Forging
- Gears
- Machining
- Molding
- Rapid Prototyping
- Spring & Wire Forming
- Stamping
- Tube Modification
- Tool, Die, & Mold Making

Providers of Contract Manufacturing Services

Contract manufacturers, job shops, and suppliers of custom manufactured parts have full access to the RFQs being sourced by members of the MFG.com buyer community. Those providers of manufacturing services can search for RFQs based on factors like geography, category, material quantity, part size, or a combination of the four. A profile is created for the manufacturing services provider where they can be found by sourcing professionals on search engines like Google, Bing, and Yahoo. There is an annual subscription for job shops, suppliers, and contract manufacturers to use MFG.com.

== Notable members ==
- Lockheed Martin
- General Motors
- Anchor Hocking
- Honeywell
- General Electric
- Enfield Technologies
- Colliers International
- L3 Communications
- Kimberly-Clark
- United States Army
- United States Air Force
- Husqvarna
- Siemens
- SpaceX
- NASA
- Nike
- Tesla
- Intel
- IBM
- FAA
