= List of city nicknames in Georgia (U.S. state) =

This partial list of city nicknames in Georgia compiles the aliases, sobriquets and slogans that cities in Georgia are known by (or have been known by historically), officially and unofficially, to municipal governments, local people, outsiders or their tourism boards or chambers of commerce. City nicknames can help in establishing a civic identity, helping outsiders recognize a community or attracting people to a community because of its nickname; promote civic pride; and build community unity. Nicknames and slogans that successfully create a new community "ideology or myth" are also believed to have economic value. Their economic value is difficult to measure, but there are anecdotal reports of cities that have achieved substantial economic benefits by "branding" themselves by adopting new slogans.

Some unofficial nicknames are positive, while others are derisive. The unofficial nicknames listed here have been in use for a long time or have gained wide currency.

== Nicknames by city ==
- Abbeville – Wild Hog Capital of Georgia
- Albany – The Good Life City “The Benny”
- Alpharetta – Awesome Alpharetta!
- Ashburn – Peanut Capital of the World
- Athens – The Classic City
- Atlanta
- Augusta – The Garden City of the South
- Blakely – Peanut Capital of the World
- Canon – The Big Gun
- Canton – Film Capital of North Georgia
- Carrollton – City of Dreams
- Carl - The Dogwood City
- Claxton – Fruitcake Capital of the World
- Colquitt – Mayhaw Capital of the World
- Columbus
  - The Lowell of the South
  - The Fountain City
- Cordele – Watermelon Capital of the World
- Dalton – Carpet Capital of the World
- Darien – Hidden Gem of the Golden Isles
- Dawson – Spanish Peanut Capital of the World
- Decatur – People's Republic of Decatur
- Dublin – The Emerald City
- Elberton – The Granite City
- Ellijay – Georgia's Apple Capital
- Fort Valley – Peach Capital of Georgia
- Gainesville – Poultry Capital of the World
- Griffin – Iris City
- LaGrange – The Greatest Little City
- Lithonia – City of Granite
- Macon
  - The Central City
  - Cherry Blossom Capital of the World
  - Maconga
- Metter – Everything's Better in Metter
- Milledgeville – Old Capitol City
- Nashville – City of Dogwoods
- Newnan – City of Homes
- Peachtree City – The Bubble
- Powder Springs – P-Town
- Quitman – The Camellia City
- Sandersville – Kaolin Capital of the World
- Savannah
  - America's Most Haunted City
  - Turf Grass Capital of the World
  - The Hostess City of the South
- Swainsboro – Crossroads of the Great South
- Sylvester – Peanut Capital of the World
- Thomasville – City of Roses
- Thomson
  - Camellia City of the South
  - Tournament City
- Tifton – The Friendly City
- Valdosta
  - The Azalea City
  - Winnersville U.S.A.
  - Titletown
- Vidalia – Sweet Onion Capital of the World
- Warner Robins – Georgia's International City
- Warwick – The Grits Capital of Georgia or The Grits Capital of the World
- Waynesboro – Bird Dog Capital of the World

== See also ==
- List of municipalities in Georgia (U.S. state)
- List of city nicknames in the United States
