= Underneath.com =

Online underwear shopping site

Underneath.com was an online lingerie and men's underwear portal based in Atlanta, Georgia. It was the first pure-play online retailer of brand name intimate apparel and men's underwear. The online portal was founded in 1997 and was owned by Jeffrey Taylor Johnson, Michael Waters, and Michael Carter. Underneath.com originally sold undergarments online and then transitioned to an undergarment shopping comparison website. It is no longer an active site. After it transitioned from selling directly to consumers, consumers used it to make informed shopping decisions when comparing underwear products from different online retailers.

== Media Exposure ==
Internet Retailer recognized Underneath.com as one of the Best 25 Internet retailers in the nation.

Time magazine noted it as one of the 13 best Apparel Internet retailers in 1999.

Business Week magazine highlighted Underneath.com's success as a pure play Internet retailer.
