= Pacific Pride =

Network of membership-only fueling stations in the United States

Pacific Pride Commercial Fueling (also known as PrideNet) is a network of membership-only fueling stations across the United States. It appeals to truckers and police forces. Its stations are franchised and are often combined with mainstream gas stations. Typically, Pacific Pride locations are independently operated commercial fueling providers offering access to a national network of fueling locations. Through its franchise locations and extended network, Pacific Pride franchisees are able to enable access to over 57,000 retail and standalone Pacific Pride locations throughout North America. The company offers fuel and no other services, unlike regular gas stations; Pacific Pride stations also have no staff of their own. Customers make all their transactions with a membership card, and the stations have emergency callboxes.

The commercial benefit of Pacific Pride compared to a credit card-based fuel card is cost and theft deterrence. Pacific Pride bills transactions on the Fleetcor network, which charges a per-event transaction fee, as opposed to a Visa percentage-of-transaction fee. This saves a substantial sum per gallon. To prevent theft, Pacific Pride has security features designed to manage drivers' fueling habits to the benefit of a fleet manager. Pacific Pride fleet cards enable a fleet manager to track fuel by the license plate of the vehicle, provide a unique PIN code for every driver, limit gallons per transaction, limit fuel types a driver can fuel with, limit the time of day the card will work, and limit zip codes fuel is allowed to be purchased in. Additionally, Pacific Pride can provide an electronic receipt to the dispatch center every time fuel is purchased in real time. This enables total control of fuel purchases by a fleet, with a level of transparency capable of deterring fuel theft by employees.
