= Great Urban Race =

- Genre: Urban Scavenger Hunt
- Frequency: Recurring
- Location: International
- Years active: 7
- Inaugurated: 2007
- Most recent: April 27, 2013
- Website: greaturbanrace.com

The Great Urban Race was an annual event held from 2007 to 2014. Advertised as 'part adventure, part scavenger hunt' it consisted of teams solving clues along a short course of at maximum six miles to be completed in any order. The clues, consisting of mental and physical challenges, required the participants to be at certain locations within the course. They could reach these check points either by foot or using public transport with other methods of transportation disallowed. The winner of the event was the team who solved all clues correctly in the fastest time. The winner, as well as the other teams in the top twenty-five, qualified for a major event held annually, and the grand winner of the finale would receive a $10,000 reward.

== History ==
The Great Urban Race was created by the founder of Red Frog Events, Joe Reynolds. Reynolds wanted to give people the opportunity to experience competitive adventure similar to The Amazing Race. At the time, Reynolds owned and operated his own house painting business. In 2007, Reynolds organized and launched Great Urban Race, LLC which held its first race on September 15 in Chicago, Illinois.

After the Chicago race, Reynolds, with the help of friend and business partner Ryan Kunkel, put on seven more races around the United States that year. By 2008, Great Urban Race had expanded to 20 cities nationwide, including a national championship race held in Las Vegas for a $10,000 grand prize.

Throughout the first four years of the event, Great Urban Race has had over 34,000 participants.

Spurred by the growth of Great Urban Race, Reynolds and Kunkel launched another race series, Warrior Dash, and renamed the company to Red Frog Events.

=== 2007 ===
The inaugural Great Urban Race took place in Chicago in 2007, spurring seven other events. In less than four months, Great Urban Race went from a single race to a national event.

Location	Date
Chicago, IL	September 15, 2007
Denver, CO	September 29, 2007
Boston, MA	October 13, 2007
Cincinnati, OH	October 20, 2007
San Francisco, CA	November 3, 2007
Austin, TX	November 17, 2007
Los Angeles, CA	December 2, 2007
San Diego, CA	December 8, 2007

=== 2008 ===
Great Urban Race took place in 20 cities in 2008. This season was the first to have a National Championship, which was hosted in Las Vegas, NV. The National Championship was between the top 25 teams from the 19 qualifying races throughout the year.

Location	Date
Tampa Bay, FL	February 2, 2008
Phoenix, AZ	February 9, 2008
Los Angeles, CA	March 8, 2008
Atlanta, GA	March 29, 2008
Dallas, TX	April 5, 2008
Cincinnati, OH	April 19, 2008
San Francisco, CA	May 3, 2008
Philadelphia, PA	May 17, 2008
Boston, MA	May 31, 2008
Seattle, WA	June 7, 2008
New York, NY	June 21, 2008
Madison, WI	June 28, 2008
Denver, CO	July 26, 2008
Washington, D.C.	August 2, 2008
Chicago, IL	September 6, 2008
Portland, OR	September 13, 2008
Twin Cities, MN	September 27, 2008
Austin, TX	October 5, 2008
Dallas, TX	October 18, 2008
Las Vegas, NV (Championship)	November 18, 2008

=== 2009 ===
2009 was another year of growth, as the participant attendance doubled. The National Championship changed locations to New Orleans, LA.

Location	Date
Tampa, FL	February 21, 2009
Phoenix, AZ	February 28, 2009
Los Angeles, CA	March 21, 2009
Austin, TX	April 4, 2009
Atlanta, GA	April 18, 2009
Washington, D. C.	May 2, 2009
San Francisco, CA	May 16, 2009
Boston, MA	May 30, 2009
Portland, OR	June 6, 2009
Madison, WI	June 20, 2009
Denver, CO	June 27, 2009
Minneapolis, MN	July 11, 2009
Chicago, IL	August 1, 2009
New York, NY	August 15, 2009
Seattle, WA	August 29, 2009
Charlotte, NC	September 12, 2009
Philadelphia, PA	September 26, 2009
Dallas, TX	October 3, 2009
Normal, IL	October 16, 2009
San Diego, CA	October 24, 2009
New Orleans, LA (Championship)	November 7, 2009

=== 2010 ===
2010 marked the first international Great Urban Race. On July 17, 2010, there was a Great Urban Race in Toronto, Ontario, Canada.

Location	Date
Miami, FL	January 30, 2010
Phoenix, AZ	February 13, 2010
Houston, TX	February 27, 2010
Tampa, FL	March 6, 2010
Los Angeles, CA	March 20, 2010
Austin, TX	March 27, 2010
Atlanta, GA	April 17, 2010
Charlotte, NC	April 24, 2010
Washington, D.C.	May 15, 2010
Boston, MA	June 5, 2010
Portland, OR	June 12, 2010
Madison, WI	June 26, 2010
Toronto, Ontario, Canada	July 17, 2010
Chicago, IL	July 24, 2010
Seattle, WA	July 31, 2010
Denver, CO	August 7, 2010
San Francisco, CA	August 14, 2010
New York, NY	August 28, 2010
Minneapolis, MN	September 11, 2010
Philadelphia, PA	September 25, 2010
Dallas, TX	October 2, 2010
Normal, IL	October 17, 2010
San Diego, CA	October 23, 2010
Las Vegas, NV (Championship)	November 6, 2010

== 2011 Season ==
The 2011 season expanded the international events, adding Sydney, Australia, and London, England to the list of locations. The number of events increased from 24 in 2010 to 40 in 2011.

Location	Date
Sydney, New South Wales, Australia	February 5, 2011
Austin, TX	February 26, 2011
Tampa, FL	March 5, 2011
Phoenix, AZ	March 12, 2011
Miami, FL	March 26, 2011
Houston, TX	April 9, 2011
Atlanta, GA	April 9, 2011
Los Angeles, CA	April 16, 2011
Nashville, TN	April 23, 2011
San Jose, CA	April 30, 2011
Boston, MA	May 7, 2011
Washington D.C.	May 14, 2011
Memphis, TN	May 21, 2011
Virginia Beach, VA	June 4, 2011
Indianapolis, IN	June 4, 2011
Portland, OR	June 11, 2011
Brooklyn, NY	June 11, 2011
Toronto, Ontario, Canada	June 18, 2011
Madison, WI	June 25, 2011
Orange County, CA	June 25, 2011
San Francisco, CA	July 9, 2011
Pittsburgh, PA	July 9, 2011
St. Louis, MO	July 16, 2011
London, England	July 23, 2011
Chicago, IL	July 23, 2011
Minneapolis, MN	July 30, 2011
Kansas City, KS	July 30, 2011
Columbus, OH	August 13, 2011
Salt Lake City, UT	August 13, 2011
Manhattan, NY	August 20, 2011
Seattle, WA	August 20, 2011
Denver, CO	August 27, 2011
Charlotte, NC	September 10, 2011
Philadelphia, PA	September 24, 2011
Normal, IL	October 8, 2011
Orlando, FL	October 8, 2011
Dallas, TX	October 15, 2011
San Antonio, TX	October 22, 2011
San Diego, CA	October 29, 2011
New Orleans, LA (Championship)	November 12, 2011

== 2012 Season ==
Great Urban Race scheduled 21 events in 2012, solely in the United States.

Location	Date
Scottsdale, AZ	February 25, 2012
Houston, TX	March 3, 2012
Tampa, FL	March 31, 2012
Santa Monica, CA	March 31, 2012
Atlanta, GA	April 14, 2012
Austin, TX	April 28, 2012
Boston, MA	May 5, 2012
Washington, D.C.	May 12, 2012
Portland, OR	June 23, 2012
Chicago, IL	July 21, 2012
New York City, NY	August 4, 2012
Seattle, WA	August 11, 2012
San Francisco, CA	August 18, 2012
Denver, CO	August 25, 2012
Philadelphia, PA	September 15, 2012
Minneapolis, MN	September 22, 2012
Charlotte, NC	September 29, 2012
Dallas, TX	October 13, 2012
San Diego, CA	October 20, 2012
Las Vegas, NV (Championship)	November 10, 2012

== 2013 Season ==
Great Urban Race scheduled 20 events in 2013, with an international race in Toronto, Ontario, Canada, and the championship in San Juan, Puerto Rico.

Location	Date
Tampa, FL	February 2, 2013
Tempe, AZ	February 23, 2013
Austin, TX	March 23, 2013
Atlanta, GA	April 13, 2013
Los Angeles, CA	April 20, 2013
Washington D.C.	April 27, 2013
Philadelphia, PA	May 4, 2013
Seattle, WA	May 18, 2013
Minneapolis, MN	July 13, 2013
Toronto, ON	July 20, 2013
Chicago, IL	July 27, 2013
Boston, MA	August 3, 2013
Portland, OR	August 10, 2013
New York, NY	August 17, 2013
Madison, WI	August 24, 2013
Denver, CO	September 28, 2013
San Francisco, CA	October 12, 2013
Houston, TX	October 19, 2013
San Diego, CA	November 2, 2013
San Juan, Puerto Rico (Championship)	December 7, 2013

== General Information ==
Registration for Great Urban Race is available both online and onsite[1]

- Registration includes a T-shirt, race-bib, clue sheet, medals for the teams, and post-race refreshments.
- Teams may have two to four members.
- Participants must be at least 14 years or older to compete.
- Participants are encouraged to wear matching themed costumes. There is a prize for the team with the best costume after each race.
- The course is designed for the fastest teams to finish in 1.5 to 3 hours, with the majority finishing in 3 to 4 hours. The race course is shut down after 5 hours.
- The distance of the race depends on the route taken by each team. Typically a race is between 4 and 8 miles.

=== Race Details ===
On race day, the Great Urban Race website suggests participants arrive a half-hour to an hour before the start time. At 12 p.m., sealed envelopes containing the clue sheet are distributed and the race begins. Rules for the race are:

- There can be up to four members per team. As of 2012, there are no adult or family divisions.
- Teams may travel by foot or public transit, which includes buses, trains, subways, and public trolleys. No taxis, bikes, or roller blades are allowed.
- Teams are allowed to solve clues in any order they choose. Some teams solve all clues and map out a route before leaving the start line, while others prefer to solve clues en route.
- Teams are required to finish 11 out of 12 clues correctly. The clock begins once the clue envelopes are opened, and times are recorded as teams cross the finish line under the Great Urban Race finish arch.
- Penalties are given to teams that did not complete or incorrectly completed a clue. For each clue not completed correctly, teams receive a 30-minute penalty that will be added to their final time.
- After penalty adjustments, teams with times longer than five hours will receive a DNF (did not finish).

=== Clues ===
Clues vary between race locations and include physical challenges, puzzles, brainteasers, and interaction with the public. Examples of past clues include: Greek dancing lessons, learning how to surf, Segway riding, Tae Kwon Do lessons, bicycle racing, fish wrangling, anagrams, cryptograms, etc.

=== Awards ===
Every Great Urban Race concludes with an awards ceremony and costume contest. Cash prizes are awarded to the top three teams.

1st place: $300
2nd place: $200
3rd place: $100

- The top three places are also awarded free entry into the Championship Race.
- The Top 25 teams qualify for the Championship Race.
- Best Costume: Teams nominate themselves for this award and the winner is judged by crowd applause.
- The St. Jude Hero award is given to the first team that crosses the finish line wearing a St. Jude cape, signifying they've raised at least $250 for St. Jude.
- The St. Jude Top fundraising winners qualify to compete in the Championship Race.

== Charity Partnerships ==
Great Urban Race partners with St. Jude Children's Research Hospital on a national level. Participants are encouraged to register as St. Jude Heroes and raise funds for St. Jude Children's Research Hospital. Heroes that raise at least $250 are eligible for race day prizes. A St. Jude representative is present at each race and determines fundraising totals.

Red Frog Events donates an additional $10 for every person who registers as a St. Jude Hero and commits to raising funds for St. Jude Children's Research Hospital. 2009 was the first year Great Urban Race partnered with St. Jude and since then, Red Frog Events and Great Urban Race have raised over $300,000 for St. Jude Children's Research Hospital.

Great Urban Race also pairs with local philanthropic organizations at each event. One clue at each race requires participants to donate a needed item to a local charity. Past charities have included Ronald McDonald House, food banks, and shelters.

== Championship Race ==
The Championship Race consists of two parts: a preliminary race from 9 a.m. to 1 p.m. and the Elite Eight race which is from 2 p.m.to 5 p.m. The top eight teams compete in the Elite Eight race, which consists of intricate clues throughout the designated city. The top team from the Elite Eight race wins a prize of $10,000. Afterwards, Red Frog Events hosts a post-race party for all participants in the city where the race is held.
