= Mylene =

Mylene or Mylène is a given name, a contraction of Marie-Hélène. Notable people and characters with the name include:

- Mylène Demongeot (1935–2022), French actress
- Mylene Dizon (born 1976), Filipino actress and model
- Mylène Farmer (born 1961), French singer-songwriter
- Mylène Jampanoï (born 1980), French actress
- Mylene Flare Jenius, fictional character in the Macross universe
- Mylene Ong (born 1991), Singaporean Olympic swimmer
- Mylene Paat (born 1994), Filipina volleyball player
- Mylène Paquette (born 1978), Quebecoise ocean rower

== See also ==
- Myleene Klass (born 1978), British entertainment personality
- Milena (given name)
