= Queen Mary 2 =

British Ocean Liner

- Queen Mary 2 in Boston on 12 September 2013

History

Bermuda (British)
- Name: RMS Queen Mary 2
- Namesake: RMS Queen Mary
- Owner: Carnival Corporation
- Operator: Cunard
- Port of registry: Southampton, United Kingdom (2004–2011); Hamilton, Bermuda (2011–present)
- Ordered: 6 November 2000
- Builder: STX Europe Chantiers de l'Atlantique, Saint-Nazaire, France
- Yard number: G32
- Laid down: 4 July 2002
- Launched: 21 March 2003
- Christened: 8 January 2004 by Elizabeth II
- Completed: 22 December 2003
- Maiden voyage: 12 January 2004
- In service: 2004–present
- Identification: Call sign: ZCEF6; IMO number: 9241061; MMSI number: 310627000
- Status: in service

General characteristics
- Type: Ocean liner
- Tonnage: 149,215 GT
- Displacement: 79,287 tonnes
- Length: 1,132 ft 0 in (345.03 m)
- Beam: 134 ft 6 in (41 m) waterline, 147.5 ft (45.0 m) extreme (bridge wings)
- Height: 236.2 ft (72.0 m) keel to (top of) funnel
- Draught: 33 ft 10 in (10.3 m)
- Decks: 14 passenger, 18 total decks
- Installed power: 4 × Wärtsilä 16V46C-CR (4 × 16,800 kW); 2 × General Electric LM2500+ (2 × 25,060 kW)
- Propulsion: Integrated electric propulsion; diesel generators & gas turbines used to generate electricity to drive four Rolls-Royce/Alstom Mermaid propulsion units (4 × 21.5 MW)
- Speed: Max speed 30 knots (56 km/h; 35 mph) Service speed 26 knots
- Capacity: 2,695 passengers (after 2016 refit); 2,620 passengers (original design)
- Crew: 1,253 officers and crew

RMS Queen Mary 2 (QM2) is a British ocean liner which has been the flagship of Cunard since April 2004 and, as of 2026, remains the only ship built and used for service as an ocean liner still in active service. Queen Mary 2 sails regular transatlantic crossings between Southampton and New York City, in addition to short cruises and an annual world voyage.

She was designed by a team of British naval architects led by Dr Stephen Payne, and was constructed in France by Chantiers de l'Atlantique. At the time of her construction, Queen Mary 2 was the longest, at 1,131.99 ft (345.03 m), and largest, with a gross tonnage of 148,528 GT, passenger ship ever built. She no longer holds these records after the construction of Royal Caribbean International's 154,407 GT Freedom of the Seas (a cruise ship) in April 2006, but remains the largest ocean liner ever built.

Queen Mary 2 was intended for some crossings of the Atlantic Ocean; the final construction cost was approximately $300,000 per berth. The cost was increased by the high quality of materials; having been designed as an ocean liner, 40% more steel was required for a liner than for a standard cruise ship. Queen Mary 2 has a maximum speed of just over 30 knots (56 km/h; 35 mph) and a cruising speed of 26 knots (48 km/h; 30 mph), which is faster than a contemporary cruise ship. Instead of the common diesel-electric configuration, Queen Mary 2 uses integrated electric propulsion to achieve her top speed. Diesel engines, augmented by gas turbines, are used to generate electricity for electric motors for propulsion and for on-board use.

Queen Mary 2's facilities include fifteen restaurants and bars, four swimming pools (originally five), a casino, the largest ballroom on a ship in service, a theatre, a library, a gym, an art gallery, a golf simulator, and the first planetarium at sea.

== Characteristics ==
Queen Mary 2 is the flagship of Cunard Line. She was constructed to replace the Queen Elizabeth 2, which was the Cunard flagship from 1969 to 2004 and the last major ocean liner built before Queen Mary 2. Queen Mary 2 had the RMS (Royal Mail Ship) prefix conferred on her by the Royal Mail when she entered service in 2004, as a gesture to Cunard's history. Although general mail is no longer transported by liners, the criterion for this designation, Queen Mary 2 carries a traditional red postbox for passengers and accepts mail also through the purser's office, which has a special stamp for all letters posted aboard.

Queen Mary 2 is not a steamship like many of her predecessors, but is powered primarily by four diesel engines, with two additional gas turbines providing extra power when required; this integrated electric propulsion configuration is used to produce the power to drive her four electric propulsion pods as well as the ship's hotel services. The spaces for these prime movers are split, and controls are backed up, so that a single failure will not disable the ship.

Like her predecessor Queen Elizabeth 2 she is built for crossing the Atlantic Ocean, and is also regularly used for cruising. In the winter season she cruises from New York to the Caribbean. Queen Mary 2's 30-knot (56 km/h; 35 mph) open ocean speed sets the ship apart from cruise ships, such as MS Oasis of the Seas, which has a service speed of 22.6 knots (41.9 km/h; 26.0 mph); Queen Mary 2's normal service speed is 26 knots (48 km/h; 30 mph). While the hull of a cruise ship will typically have a block coefficient of 0.73 (1.0 would represent a rectangular block) Queen Mary 2 is more fine-lined, with a block coefficient of 0.61.

== Design and construction ==
Queen Mary 2 under construction, her radar mast in the right foreground

RMS Queen Mary 2 (pink) compared to large ships and buildings: The Pentagon, 1,414 feet, 431 m RMS Queen Mary 2, 1,132 feet, 345 m USS Enterprise, 1,123 feet, 342 m Hindenburg, 804 feet, 245 m Yamato, 863 feet, 263 m Empire State Building, 1,454 feet, 443 m Seawise Giant, 1,503 feet, 458 m Apple Park, 1,522 feet, 464 m

Cunard completed a design for a new class of 84,000 GT, 2,000 passenger liners on 8 June 1998, but revised them upon comparing those specifications with Carnival Cruise Line's 100,000 GT Destiny-class cruise ships and Royal Caribbean International's 137,276 GT Voyager class.

In December 1998, Cunard released details of Project Queen Mary, the project to develop a liner that would complement Queen Elizabeth 2. Harland & Wolff of Northern Ireland, Aker Kværner of Norway, Fincantieri of Italy, Meyer Werft of Germany, and Chantiers de l'Atlantique of France were invited to bid on the project. The contract was finally signed with Chantiers de l'Atlantique, a subsidiary of Alstom, on 6 November 2000. This was the same yard that built Cunard's former rivals, the SS Normandie and France of the Compagnie Générale Transatlantique.

Queen Mary 2's keel was laid down on 4 July 2002, in the construction dock at Saint-Nazaire, France, with the hull number G32. Approximately 3,000 craftsmen spent around eight million working hours on the ship, and around 20,000 people were directly or indirectly involved in her design, construction, and fitting out. In total, 300,000 pieces of steel were assembled into 94 "blocks" off the dry dock, which were then positioned and welded together to complete the hull and superstructure. After floating out on 21 March 2003, the Queen Mary 2 was fitted out in the large fitting out basin ("Bassin C"), the first ship to use this huge dry dock since the shipyard built large tankers in the 1970s, such as MV Gastor. Her sea trials were conducted during 25–29 September and 7–11 November 2003, between Saint-Nazaire and the offshore islands of Île d'Yeu and Belle-Île.

The final stages of construction were marred by a fatal accident on 15 November 2003, when a gangway collapsed under a group of shipyard workers and their relatives who had been invited to visit the vessel. In total, 16 people were killed and another 32 people injured after a 15-metre (49 ft) fall into the drydock.

Construction was completed on schedule. On 22 December 2003, Queen Mary 2 left Saint-Nazaire and arrived in Southampton, England, on 26 December 2003. On 8 January 2004, the liner was officially named by Queen Elizabeth II.

=== Exterior ===
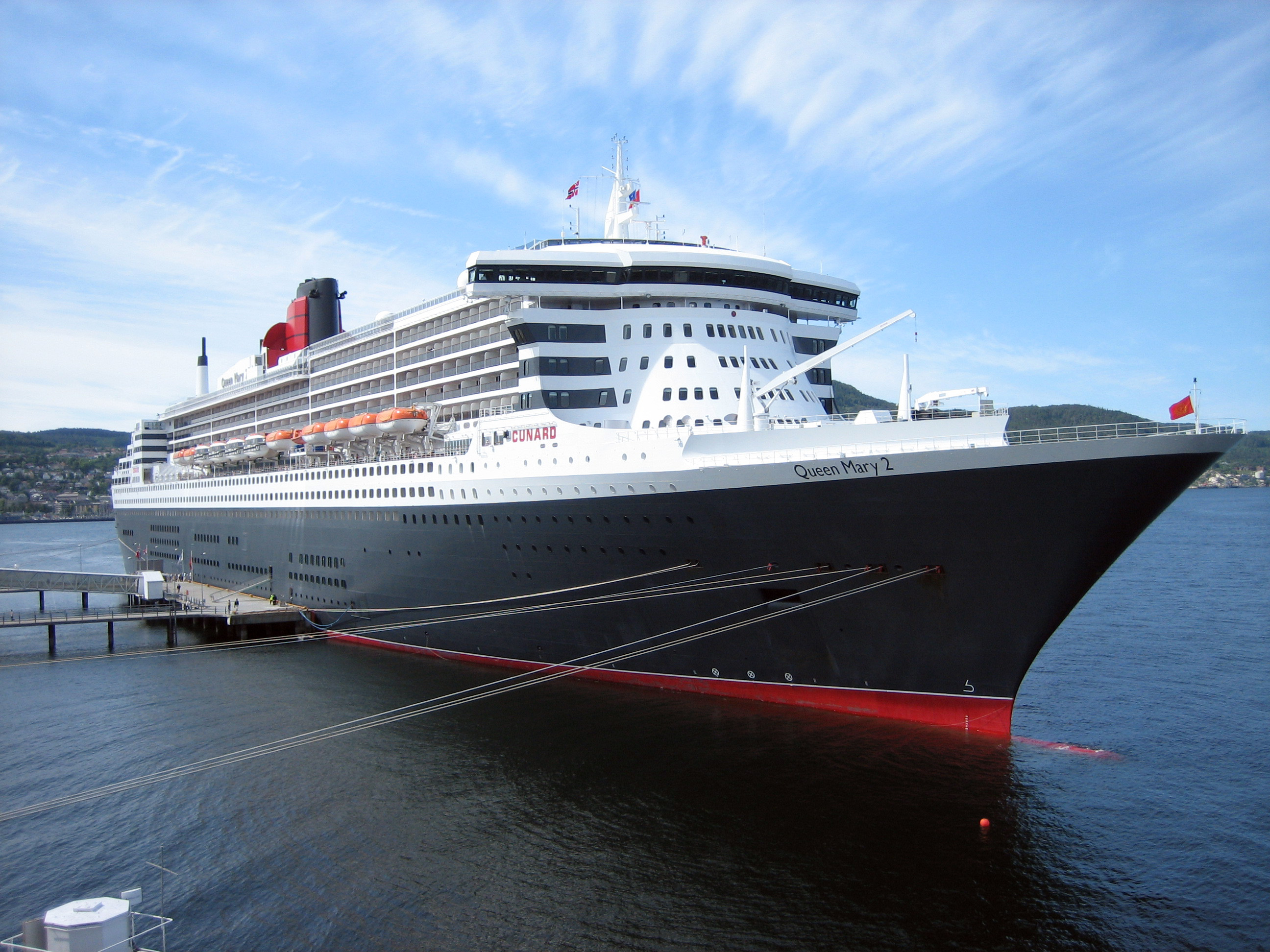
Queen Mary 2 at Trondheim, 2007

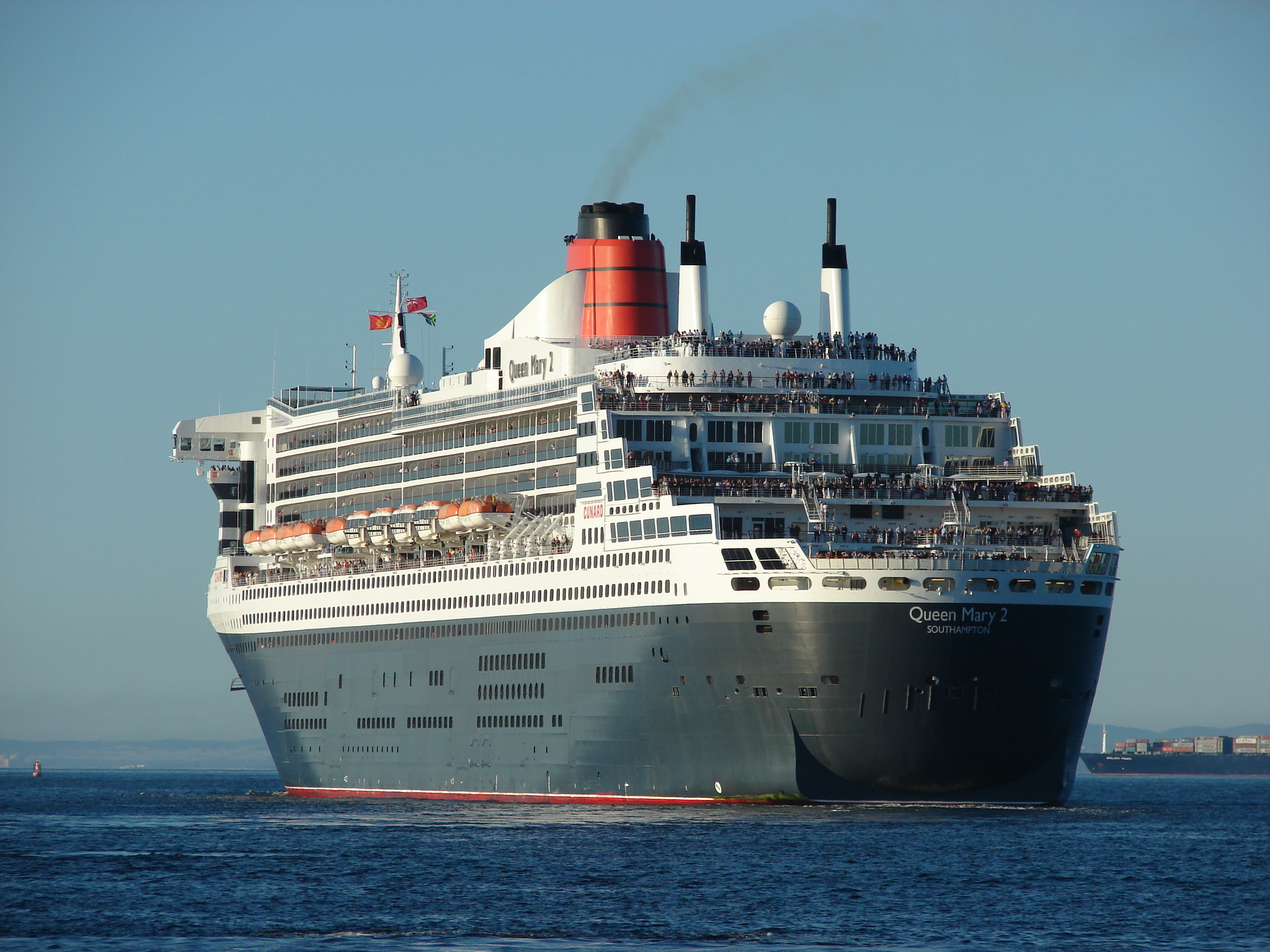
Queen Mary 2 at Cape Town, showing the Costanzi stern

Queen Mary 2's principal naval architect was Carnival's in-house designer, Stephen Payne. He intended many aspects of the ship's design to resemble notable aspects of former ocean liners, such as the ship's predecessor Queen Elizabeth 2 and her predecessors Queen Mary and Queen Elizabeth. These include the three thick black lines known as "hands" that wrap around either edge of the ship's bridge screen, and at the stern end of the superstructure, which are to recall the appearance of the crossovers of the forward decks on the first Queen Mary.

Queen Mary 2 has 14,164 square metres (152,460 ft^{2}) of exterior deck space, with wind screens to shield passengers in rough seas. The ship was originally constructed with five swimming pools. However, the shallow "Splash Pool" on Deck 13 was removed during the ship's 2016 refurbishment to make room for additional staterooms. Two of her remaining four swimming pools are outdoors. There are indoor pools on deck 7, in the Canyon Ranch Spa Club, and on Deck 12. The Pavilion Pool on Deck 12 is covered with a retractable magrodome.

In common with liners such as RMS Queen Mary, there is a continuous wrap-around promenade deck (deck 7). This passes behind the bridge screen and allows passengers to circumnavigate the deck while protected from the winds; one circuit is 620 m (2,030 ft) long. The flanking promenades are created by the need to step the superstructure to allow space for lifeboats. By SOLAS standards, these should have been lower on the hull (15 m (49 ft) above the waterline), but for the sake of appearance as well as to avoid the danger of large waves damaging the boats, Payne convinced SOLAS officials to exempt Queen Mary 2 from this requirement, and the boats are 25 m (82 ft) above the waterline.

Payne's original intention was for a stern profile with a spoon shape, similar to most previous liners, but the mounting of the propeller pods required a flat transom. The compromise was a Costanzi stern – a combination of the two, which provides the transom required for azimuthal pod propulsors and has better seaholding characteristics in a following swell. In common with many modern ships, Queen Mary 2 has a bulbous bow to reduce drag and thereby increase speed, range, and fuel efficiency.

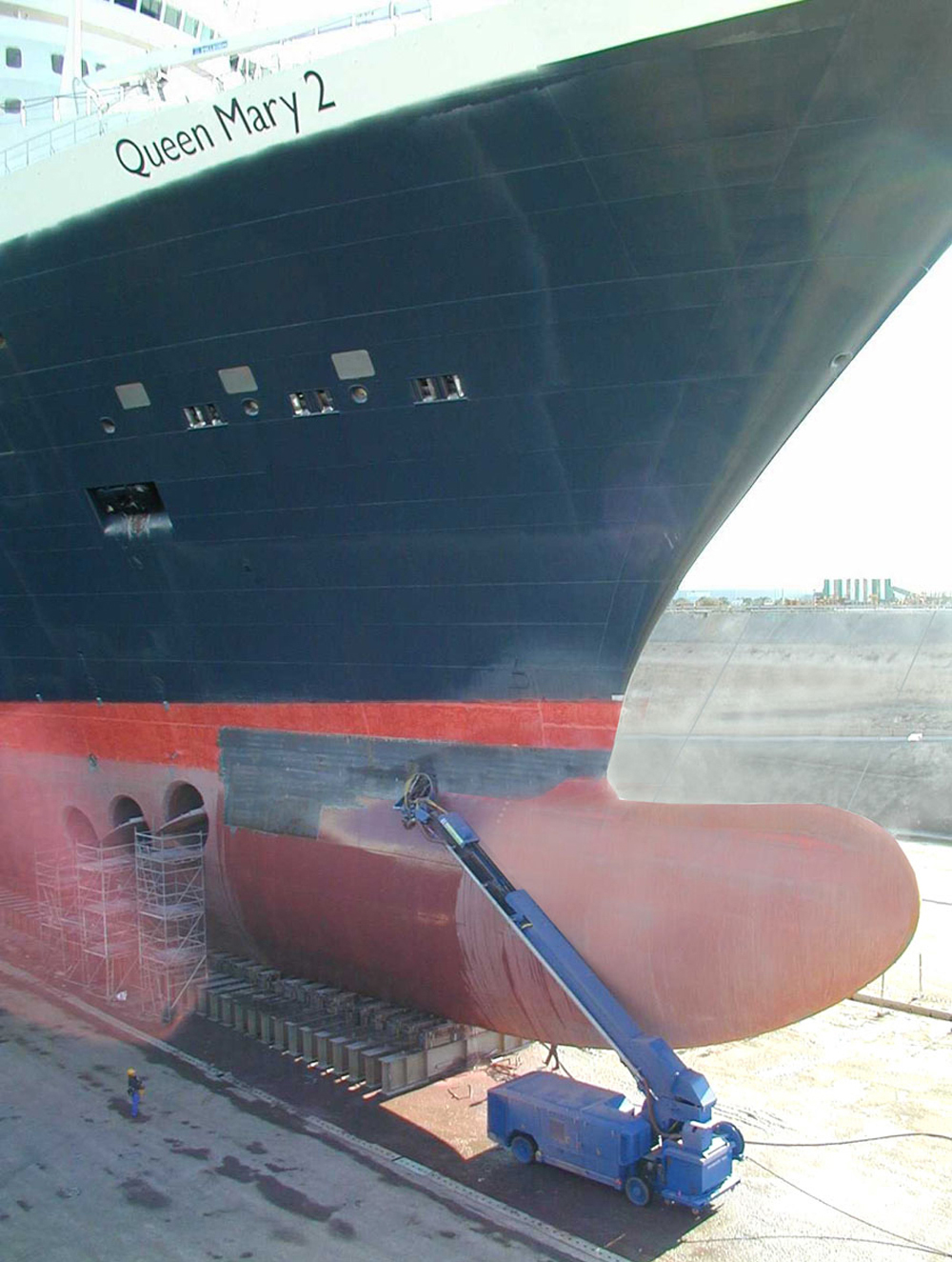
Bulbous bow of Queen Mary 2

While of a design similar to that of Queen Elizabeth 2, Queen Mary 2's funnel has a slightly different shape, because a taller funnel would have made it impossible for the ship to pass under the Verrazzano–Narrows Bridge in New York City at high tide. The final design permits a minimum of 13 feet (4.0 m) of clearance under the bridge.

As Queen Mary 2 is too large to dock in many ports, passengers are often ferried to and from the ship in tenders, which can also be used as lifeboats. These are stored at sea in davits alongside the lifeboats. To transport passengers ashore the tenders pull up to one of four loading stations, each of which has a large hull door that opens hydraulically to form a boarding platform, complete with railings and decking.

Queen Mary 2 was designed as a post-Panamax ship, too wide to use the Panama Canal before its expansion in 2016. As a result, prior to her world cruise in 2026 (where she transited the canal for the first time), she had to circumnavigate South America to transit between the Atlantic and Pacific oceans. The decision not to constrain her width to transit the Panama Canal was taken as Queen Elizabeth 2 only transited once a year, during the world cruise. Cunard decided to pass up the convenience of the occasional passage in favour of a greater passenger capacity.

=== Interior ===
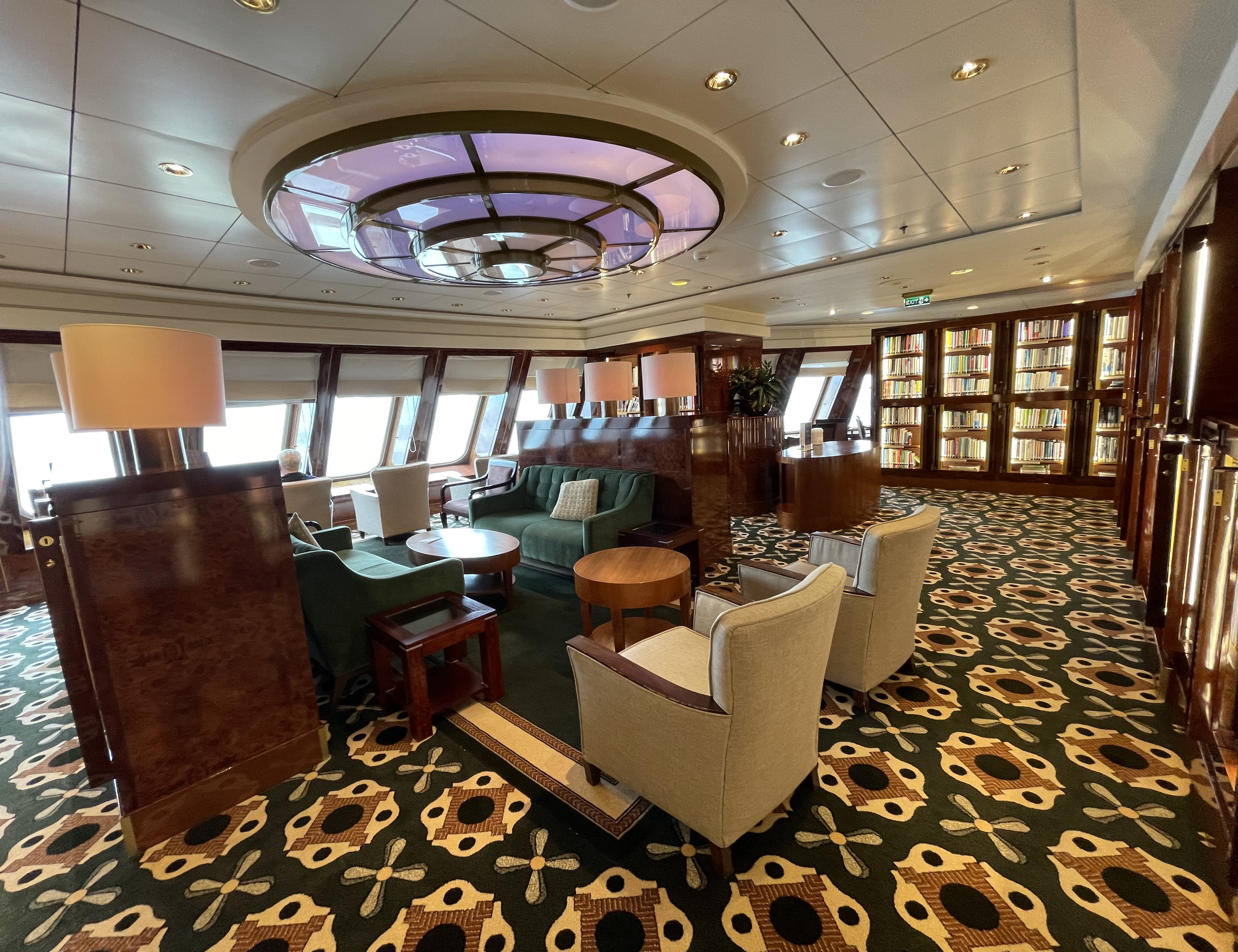
The library also has a reading area overlooking the bow of the ship.

As is the case with many modern passenger ships, many of the major public rooms on board Queen Mary 2 are on the lowest public decks of the ship, with the passenger cabins stacked above. Deck 2, the lowest passenger deck, contains the Illuminations theatre, cinema and planetarium (the first at sea); Royal Court Theatre; Grand Lobby; "Empire Casino"; "Golden Lion Pub"; and the lower level of the "Britannia Restaurant". Deck 3 holds the upper levels of "Illuminations", the "Royal Court theatre" and the "Britannia Restaurant", as well as a small shopping arcade, "Veuve Cliquot champagne bar", the "Chart Room", "Sir Samuel's" wine bar, the "Queen's Room", and the "G32" Nightclub. The other main public deck is Deck 7, on which are the "Canyon Ranch Spa", "Carinthia Lounge", "King's Court", the "Queen's Grill Lounge", and the "Queen's Grill" and "Princess Grill" restaurants for higher-fare passengers. The public rooms on Deck 8 include the à la carte "Verandah Restaurant", an 8,000-volume library (the largest of any cruise ship), a book shop and the upper part of the Canyon Ranch Spa. Also on Deck 8 is a large outdoor pool and terrace at the stern. The kennels, located aft on starboard side of Deck 12, are available only for transatlantic crossings. They can accommodate up to twenty-two dogs (the kennels will also take cats) in small and large cages.

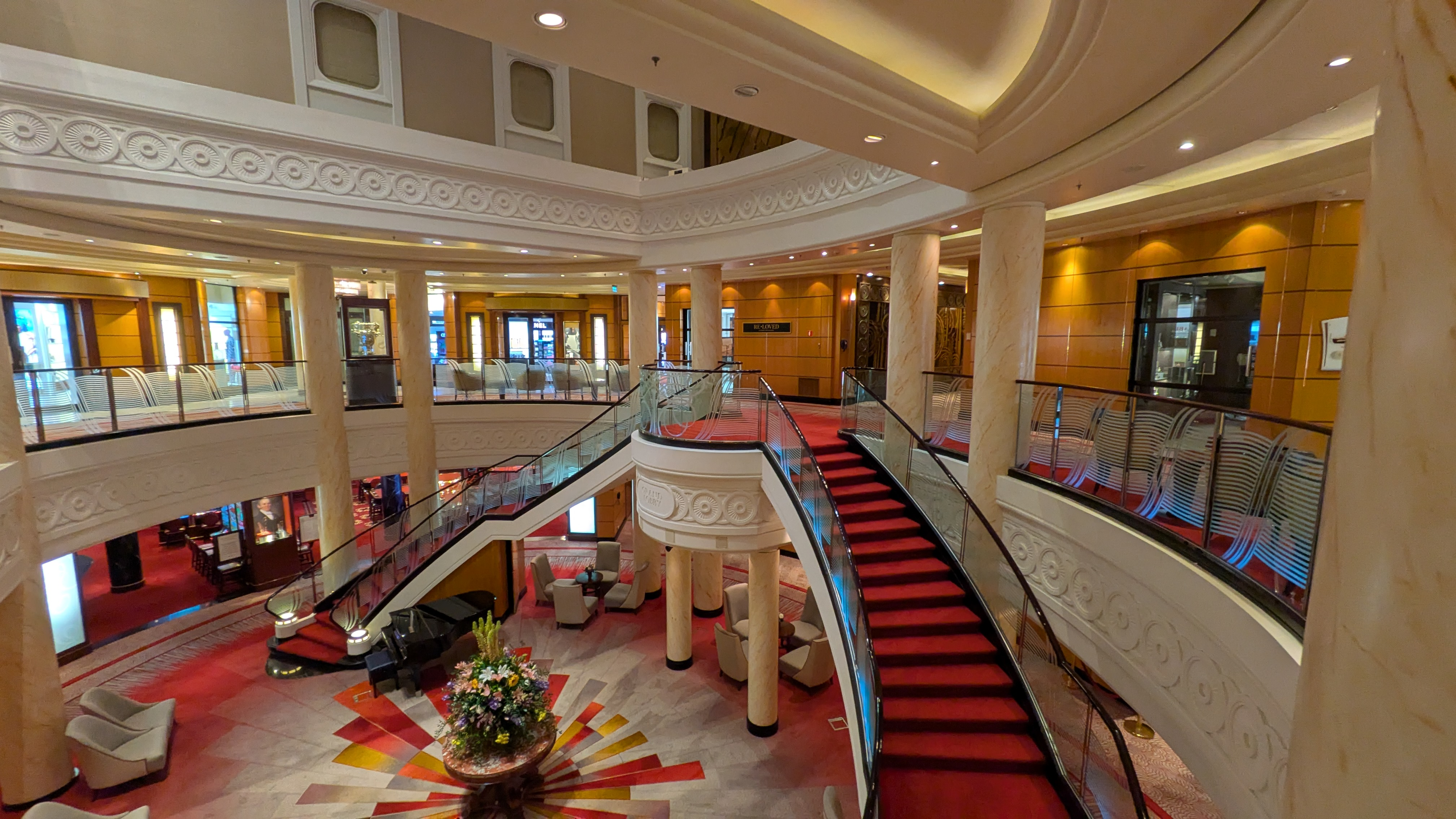
The Grand Lobby on Queen Mary 2

The King's Court area on the ship is open twenty four hours a day, serving as a buffet restaurant for breakfast and lunch. The overall space is divided into quarters, with each section decorated according to the theme of the four separate alternate dining venues that are "created" each evening through lighting, tableware, and menus: Lotus, which specialises in Asian cuisine; the Carvery, a British style grille; La Piazza, with Italian food; and the Chef's Galley, which offers an interactive experience to food preparation.

The passengers' dining arrangements on board are dictated by the type of accommodation in which they choose to travel. Around 85% of passengers are in Britannia class, and, therefore, dine in the main restaurant. However, passengers can choose to upgrade to either a "junior suite", and dine in the "Princess Grill"', or a suite, and dine in the "Queens' Grill". Those in the two latter categories are grouped together by Cunard as "Grill Passengers", and they are permitted to use the "Queens' Grill Lounge" and a private outdoor area on deck 11 with its own whirlpool. This feature is also present on both Queen Victoria and Queen Elizabeth. However, all other public areas can be used by all passengers.

As the Britannia Restaurant takes up the full width of the ship on two decks, a 'tween deck, called Deck 3L, was devised to allow passengers to walk from the Grand Lobby to the Queen's Room without traversing the dining room mid-meal. The deck consists of two corridors that run beneath the upper balcony of the restaurant on Deck 3, and above the main dining area on Deck 2. This is why the balcony of the Britannia has tiers that step up towards the hull. This arrangement is illustrated on the hull where there is a stack of three rows of windows in the area where the main restaurant sits, the two upper and lower most rows illuminate the dining room, while the centre row serves Deck 3L. There is a similar arrangement through the Royal Court Theatre. As well, the passages that run on either side of Illuminations on Deck 3 ramp upwards to compensate for the change in deck elevation between the entrance to Illuminations and an elevator bank forward of the room.

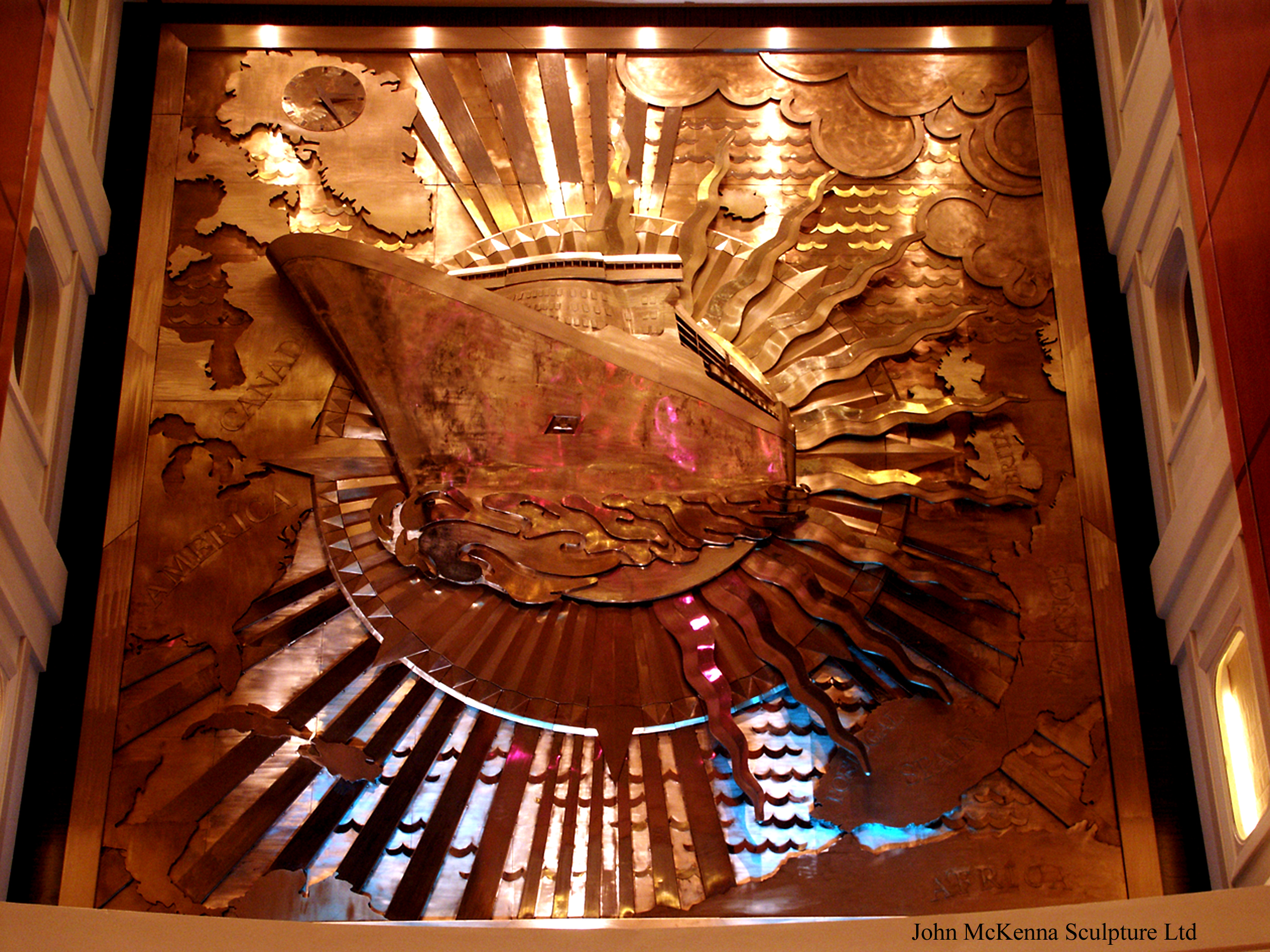
John McKenna's bronze sculpture panel on the grand lobby staircase

More than 5,000 commissioned works of art are visible in Queen Mary 2's public rooms, corridors, staterooms and lobbies, having been created by 128 artists from sixteen countries. Two of the most notable pieces are Barbara Broekman's tapestry, an abstract depiction of an ocean liner, bridge, and New York skyline which spans the full height of the Britannia Restaurant, and the British sculptor John McKenna's sheet bronze relief mural in the Grand Lobby, a seven square metre portrait of the ship fabricated in bronze inspired by the Art Deco mural in the main dining room of the original Queen Mary. The Deck 10 Pavilion features a glass ellipse sculpture by Tomasz Urbanowicz called "Blue Sun Setting in the Ocean".

== Technical aspects ==
=== Power plant and propulsion system ===
Queen Mary 2's power plant comprises four sixteen-cylinder Wärtsilä 16V46CR EnviroEngine marine diesel engines, generating a combined 67,200 kW (90,100 hp) at 514 rpm, and two General Electric LM2500+ gas turbines, provide a further 50,000 kW (67,000 hp); these drive electric generators, which in turn provide the power to drive four 21,500 kW (28,800 hp) Alstom electrical motors located inside the podded propulsors (and thus entirely outside the vessel's hull). Such an arrangement, known as integrated electric propulsion (IEP), provides for economical cruising at low speed combined with an ability to sustain much higher speeds when required, and has been common in naval vessels for several decades. The Queen Mary 2's gas turbines are not housed along with her diesels in the engine room deep in her hull, but instead are in a soundproofed enclosure directly beneath the funnel. This arrangement allows the turbines to be supplied with sufficient air without having to run large diameter air ducts the height of the ship, which would have wasted valuable interior space.

The propulsors are Rolls-Royce Mermaid azimuth thruster type podded propulsion units, each with one forward-facing low-vibration propeller with separately bolted blades. The forward pair of thrusters is fixed, but the aft pair can swivel through 360°, removing the need for a rudder. Queen Mary 2 is the first quadruple-propeller passenger ship completed since the SS France in 1961. Queen Mary 2 carries eight spare blades on the foredeck, immediately forward of the bridge screen. In addition to the primary thrusters, the ship is also fitted with three bow thrusters, with a power output of 3.2 MW each. These allow the ship to turn in its own length while in port, to conduct more complex docking manoeuvres.

The propulsor pods fitted to Queen Mary 2 have been prone to failure, attributed to the motors' thrust bearings, which continued to show a tendency to fail even after numerous attempts at redesign. In January 2009, Carnival, through its Cunard division, sued Rolls-Royce in the United States. The line alleged that the Mermaid pod propulsion systems fitted to Queen Mary 2 were inherently defective in design, and that Rolls-Royce knew about the design deficiencies and deliberately conspired to mislead, deceive and defraud in the course of winning the contract. In January 2011, the court awarded Carnival US$24 million (approximately UK£15 million at the time of verdict).

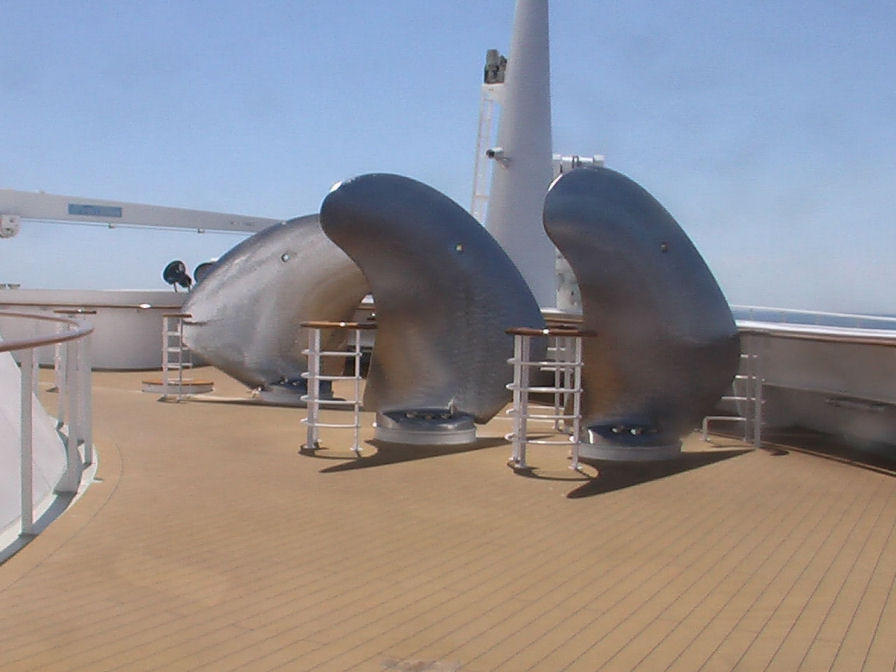
Three of the eight spare propeller blades mounted on the foredeck

=== Navigation ===
Queen Mary 2 has a fully integrated bridge system initially designed by British firm Kelvin Hughes, which controls the ship's navigation systems, radar, dynamic positioning system, and engine monitoring system. Kelvin Hughes supplied many of the ship's components, including the Electronic Chart Display and Information System (ECDIS) and eight multifunction display units. This system was replaced by Wärtsilä NACOS Platinum suite in 2023 to bring her inline with her fleetmates.

=== Water supply ===
Fresh water aboard Queen Mary 2 is supplied by three Alfa Laval multiple effect plate (MEP) evaporators, each with a capacity of 630,000 litres (170,000 US gal) per day. The plants' energy is supplied primarily by steam and cooling water from the ship's gas turbines and diesel engines, or if needed by steam from the ship's two oil-fired boilers. The traditional multiple-effect distillation technology has been improved for the ship's plant, so that scaling of plates is reduced, vastly reducing maintenance required. The desalinated water has a very low salt content of less than five parts per million. Average total water production is 1,100,000 litres (290,000 US gal) per day with a capacity of 1,890,000 litres (500,000 US gal) so that there is ample spare capacity. The ship could easily be supplied by only two of the three plants. Potable water tanks have a capacity of 3,830,000 litres (1,010,000 US gal), enough for more than three days of supply. If the engines are running on low load (when the ship is running at a slow speed) the engine jacket cooling water temperature is insufficient to heat the seawater to run the desalination plants. In that case steam from oil-fired boilers is used to heat the sea water. This is uneconomical as generating steam is expensive. It may be cheaper, therefore, to buy water in a particular port than to produce it on board. The seawater intakes are located in the hull of the ship. Concentrated salt solution (brine) is discharged to the sea closer to the ship's stern together with cooling water from the engines.

== Service history ==
On 12 January 2004 Queen Mary 2 set sail on her maiden voyage from Southampton, England, to Fort Lauderdale, Florida, in the United States, carrying 2,620 passengers. She was under the command of captain Ronald Warwick, who had previously commanded Queen Elizabeth 2. Warwick is the son of William (Bil) Warwick, who had also been a senior Cunard officer and the first captain of Queen Elizabeth 2. The ship returned to Southampton late from her maiden voyage after bow doors covering the thrusters failed to shut in Portugal.

During the 2004 Summer Olympics Queen Mary 2 sailed to Athens and docked at Piraeus for two weeks for use as a floating hotel, serving the then Prime Minister of the United Kingdom Tony Blair and his wife Cherie, French President Jacques Chirac, President of the United States George W. Bush, and the United States Olympic men's basketball team. According to Cunard, Queen Mary 2's passengers have also included jazz musician Dave Brubeck and singers Rod Stewart, Carly Simon, and James Taylor.

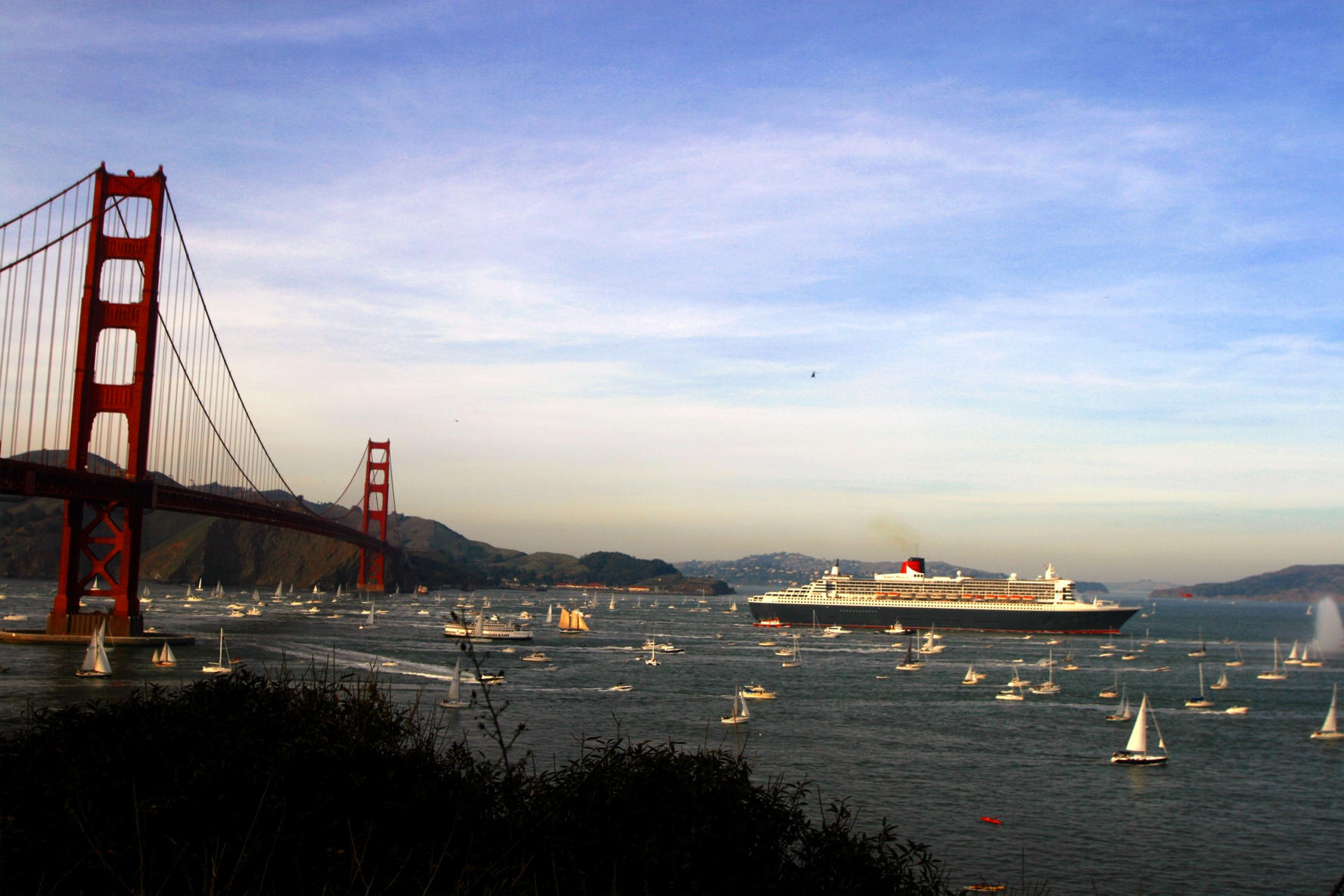
Queen Mary 2 in San Francisco, California in 2007

One 2005 transatlantic crossing saw Queen Mary 2 carrying, in a locked steamer trunk, the first United States copy of J. K. Rowling's book Harry Potter and the Half-Blood Prince, autographed by the author. In a promotional press release for the event, Cunard said that this marked the first time a book had been transported to its international launch on an ocean liner. The signed copy was given to the West Asheville Library, located in the city of Asheville, North Carolina.

In January 2006 Queen Mary 2 embarked on a cruise to South America. Upon departure from Fort Lauderdale, one of her propeller pods was damaged when it struck a channel wall, forcing the ship to sail at a reduced speed, which resulted in Commodore Warwick's decision to skip several calls on its voyage to Rio de Janeiro. Many of her passengers threatened to stage a sit-in protest because of the missed calls, before Cunard offered to refund the voyage costs. Queen Mary 2 continued to operate at a reduced service speed and several itinerary changes were necessary until repairs had been completed after the ship returned to Europe in June, where Queen Mary 2 went into drydock and the damaged propeller pod was unseated. In November, Queen Mary 2 was drydocked once more at the Blohm+Voss yard in Hamburg (drydock Elbe 17) for the reinstallation of the repaired propeller pod. At the same time, sprinkler systems were installed in all of the vessel's balconies to comply with new safety regulations which had come into effect since the MS Star Princess fire. Additionally, both bridge wings were extended by two metres to improve visibility.

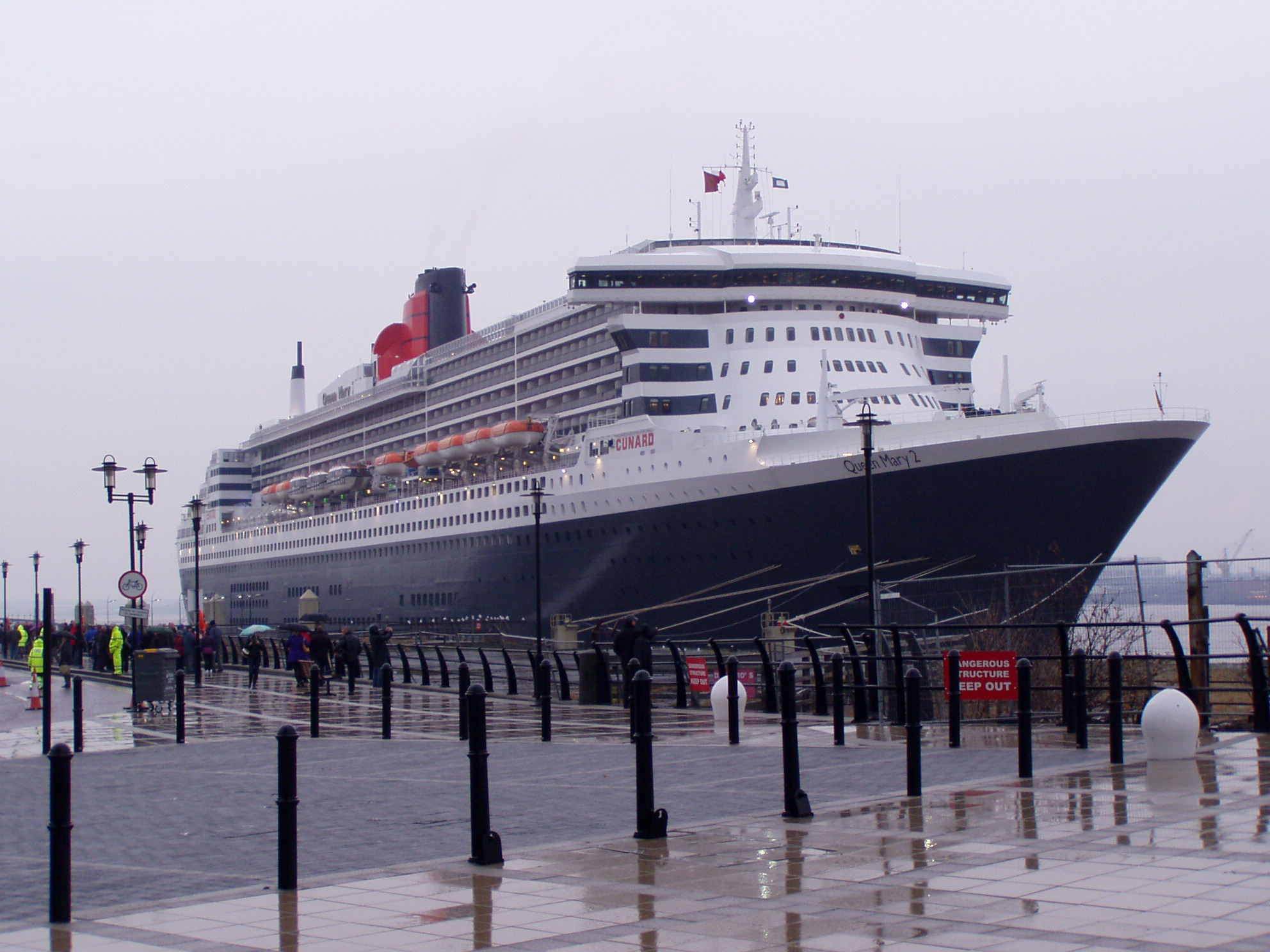
Queen Mary 2 at Pier Head, Liverpool, England, during a 2009 visit

After completing the journey around South America, on 23 February 2006, Queen Mary 2 met her namesake, the original RMS Queen Mary, which is permanently docked at Long Beach, California. Escorted by a flotilla of smaller ships, the two Queens exchanged a "whistle salute" which was heard throughout the city of Long Beach. Queen Mary 2 met the other serving Cunard liners Queen Victoria and Queen Elizabeth 2 on 13 January 2008 near the Statue of Liberty in New York City harbour, with a celebratory fireworks display; Queen Elizabeth 2 and Queen Victoria made a tandem crossing of the Atlantic for the meeting. This marked the first time three Cunard Queens have been present in the same location. Cunard stated this would be the last time these three ships would ever meet, due to Queen Elizabeth 2's impending retirement from service in late 2008. However this would prove not to be the case, as the three Queens met in Southampton on 22 April 2008. Queen Mary 2 rendezvoused with Queen Elizabeth 2 in Dubai on Saturday 21 March 2009, after the latter ship's retirement, while both ships were berthed at Port Rashid. With the withdrawal of Queen Elizabeth 2 from Cunard's fleet and its docking in Dubai, Queen Mary 2 became the only ocean liner left in active passenger service.

On 3 August 2007 three men were stopped by police while escorting and piloting a replica of the first American combat submarine within 200 feet (61 m) of Queen Mary 2, which was docked at the cruise ship terminal in Red Hook, Brooklyn. The replica was created by New York artist Philip "Duke" Riley and two out-of-town residents, one of whom claimed to be a descendant of David Bushnell, who had invented it. The Coast Guard issued Riley a citation for having an unsafe vessel, and for violating the security zone around Queen Mary 2.

On 19 October 2011, Queen Mary 2 had her registry changed to Hamilton, Bermuda, from her previous home port of Southampton, to allow the ship to host on-board weddings. This marked the first time in its 171-year history that Cunard has not had a ship registered in the UK. Bermuda is a member of the Red Ensign Group and the ship continues to fly the undefaced Red Ensign rather than the Bermuda Red Ensign.

=== Boston Cup ===
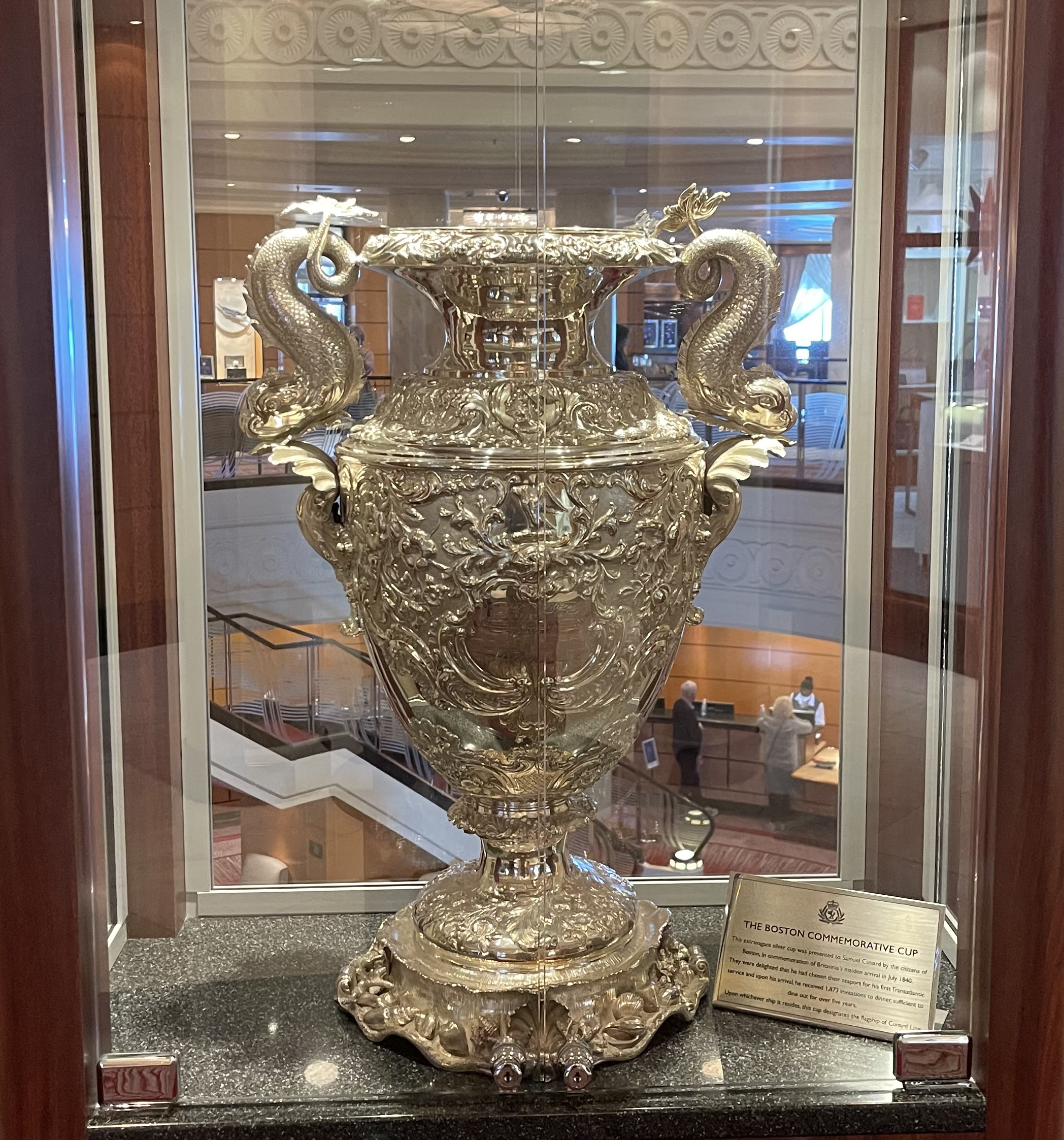
The Boston Cup aboard Queen Mary 2

Carried aboard Queen Mary 2 is the Boston Cup. Sometimes referred to as The Britannia Cup, this artefact was created for Sir Samuel Cunard in Boston, United States, to commemorate the arrival of his first vessel RMS Britannia. Cunard had selected Boston as the American port for his Atlantic service, which resulted in a strong connection between Boston and the Cunard Line. It is believed that the cup was presented to Sir Samuel Cunard sometime in 1840, but for much of its life it was missing. It was discovered in an antique shop in 1967 and returned to Cunard, where it was placed aboard Queen Elizabeth 2. In 2004, when Queen Mary 2 became the flagship, the Boston Cup was placed aboard Queen Mary 2. It is in a glass case, aft of the Chart Room lounge.

=== Special cruises ===
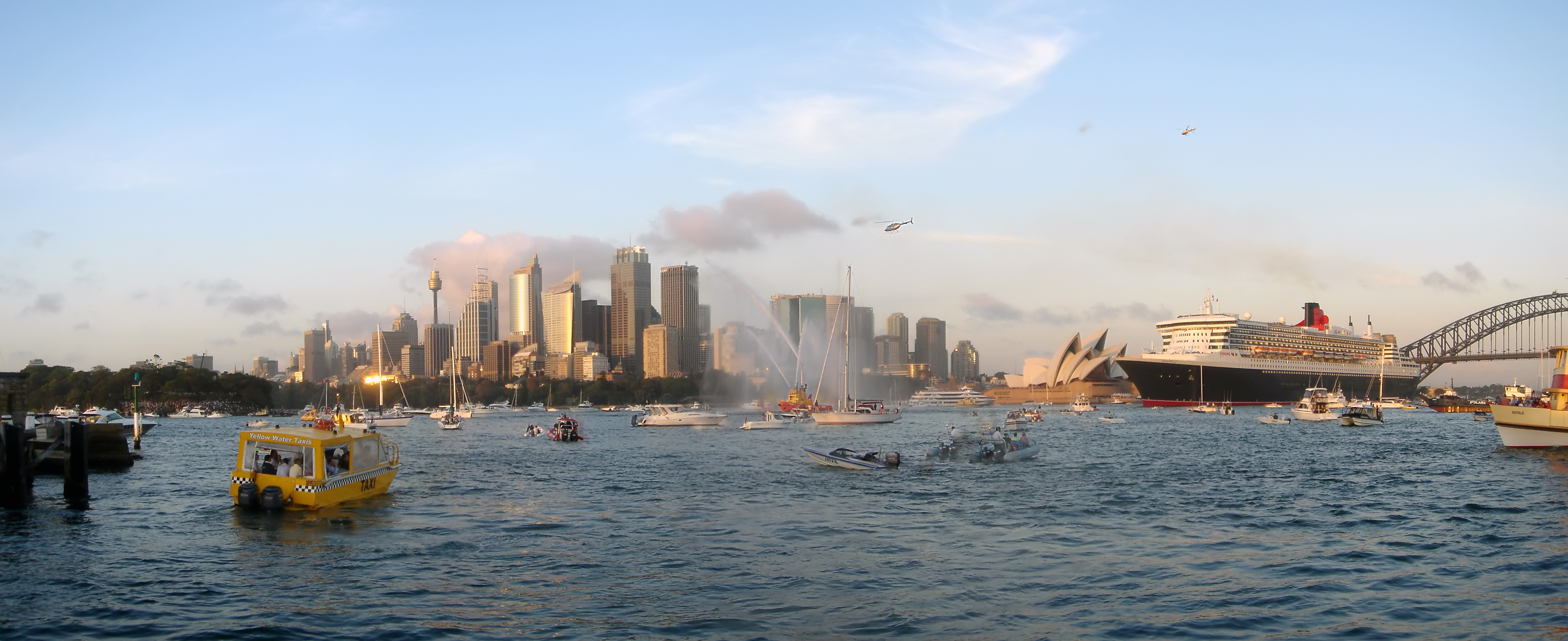
Queen Mary 2 in Sydney, 20 February 2007

On 10 January 2007, Queen Mary 2 started her first world cruise, circumnavigating the globe in 81 days. On 20 February, she met her fleet-mate, Queen Elizabeth 2, also on her 2007 world cruise, in Sydney Harbour. This is the first time two Cunard Queens had been together in Sydney since the original Queen Mary and Queen Elizabeth served as troop ships in 1941. Despite the early arrival time of 5:42 am, the Queen Mary 2's presence attracted so many viewers that the Sydney Harbour Bridge and Anzac Bridge were blocked. With 1,600 passengers leaving the ships in Sydney, Cunard estimated the stopovers injected more than $3 million into the local economy.

On 10 January 2012, the ship embarked on a three-month world cruise from Southampton, travelling south and then east around Africa, a first ever circumnavigation of Australia, to Japan, then back to Southampton along the south coastline of Eurasia and through the Suez Canal.

Three years after the first Cunard Royal Rendezvous on the same date, Queen Mary 2 met up with Queen Victoria and the then brand-new MS Queen Elizabeth for another Royal Rendezvous in New York City on 13 January 2011. Queen Victoria and Queen Elizabeth made a tandem crossing of the Atlantic for the event. All three ships met in front of the statue of Liberty at 6:45 pm for Grucci fireworks. The Empire State Building was lit up in red to mark the event. On 5 June 2012, the three met again, but this time in Southampton to celebrate the Diamond jubilee of Elizabeth II.

Queen Mary 2 has rendezvoused with ocean rowing teams in the middle of the Atlantic. On 30 July 2010 she met up with Artemis Investments, whose rowing crew were Don Lennox, Livar Nysted, Ray Carroll, Leven Brown. Carroll had been a former engineer and was patched through via marine VHF radio and Queen Mary 2's public address system to speak to the captain and crew. On 26 September 2013 Queen Mary 2 resupplied solo-rower Mylène Paquette and her vessel Hermel with a replacement satellite phone, drogue anchor and groceries. Queen Mary 2 changed her course by 20 degrees and only added 14 nautical miles (26 km) to the overall distance of the crossing.

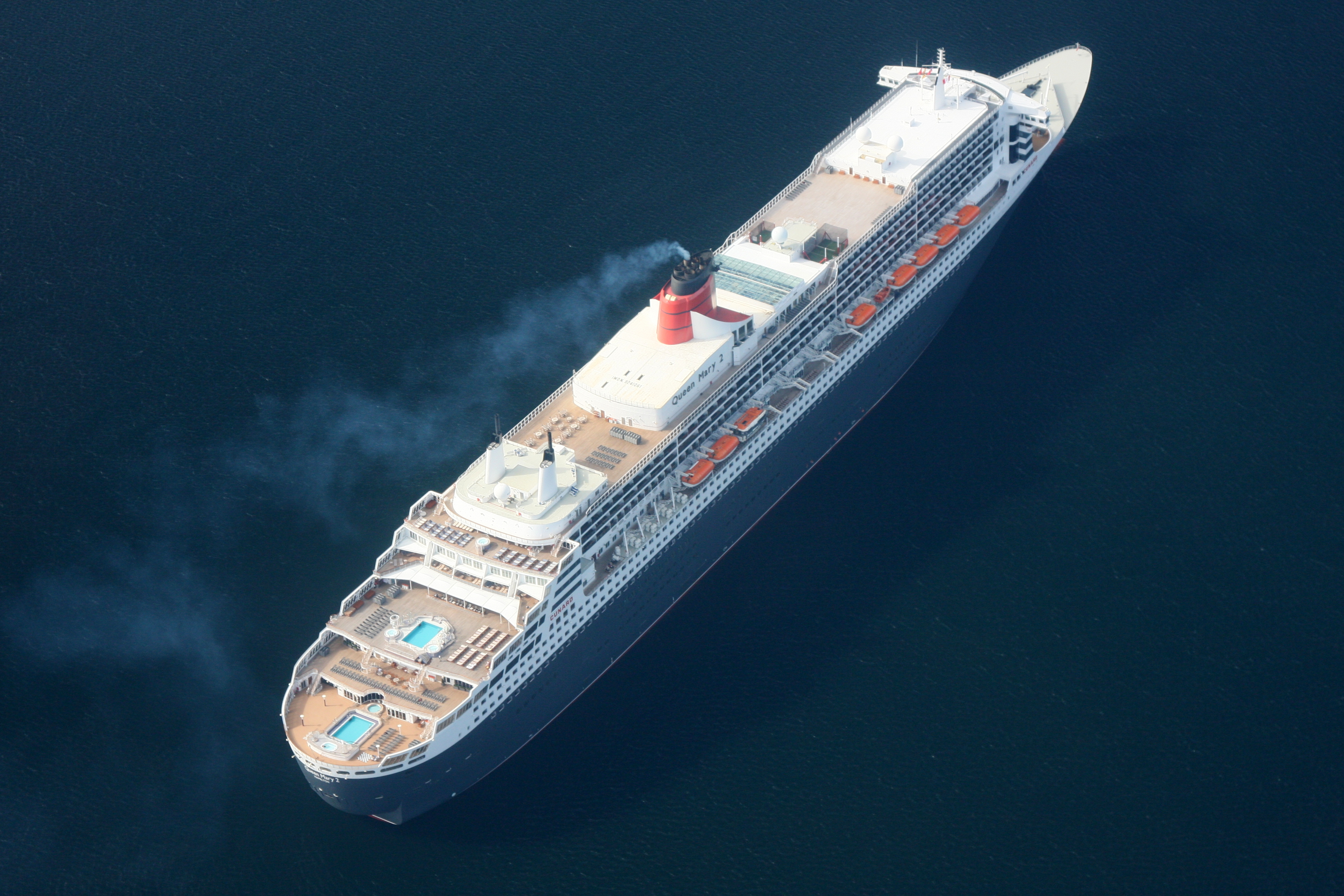
The RMS Queen Mary 2 visiting Sydney Harbour, Cape Breton Island, on 1 October 2016.

On 6 July 2013 Queen Mary 2 departed New York en route to Southampton on her 200th transatlantic voyage. On board speakers were Stephen Payne OBE—the ship's designer—and presenter and newsreader Nick Owen, who presented talks about the ship's design. On 25 May 2015, all three Queens met, once again, at Liverpool, in order to celebrate the 175th anniversary of the shipping line. After arriving at Liverpool the previous day, Queen Mary 2 made a brief excursion to the entrance of the River Mersey to welcome her two fleetmates into port in the early afternoon. The three Cunarders then sailed, in formation, towards Liverpool. The ships spent several hours together, before the departure of Queen Mary 2 to Saint Peter Port, Guernsey.

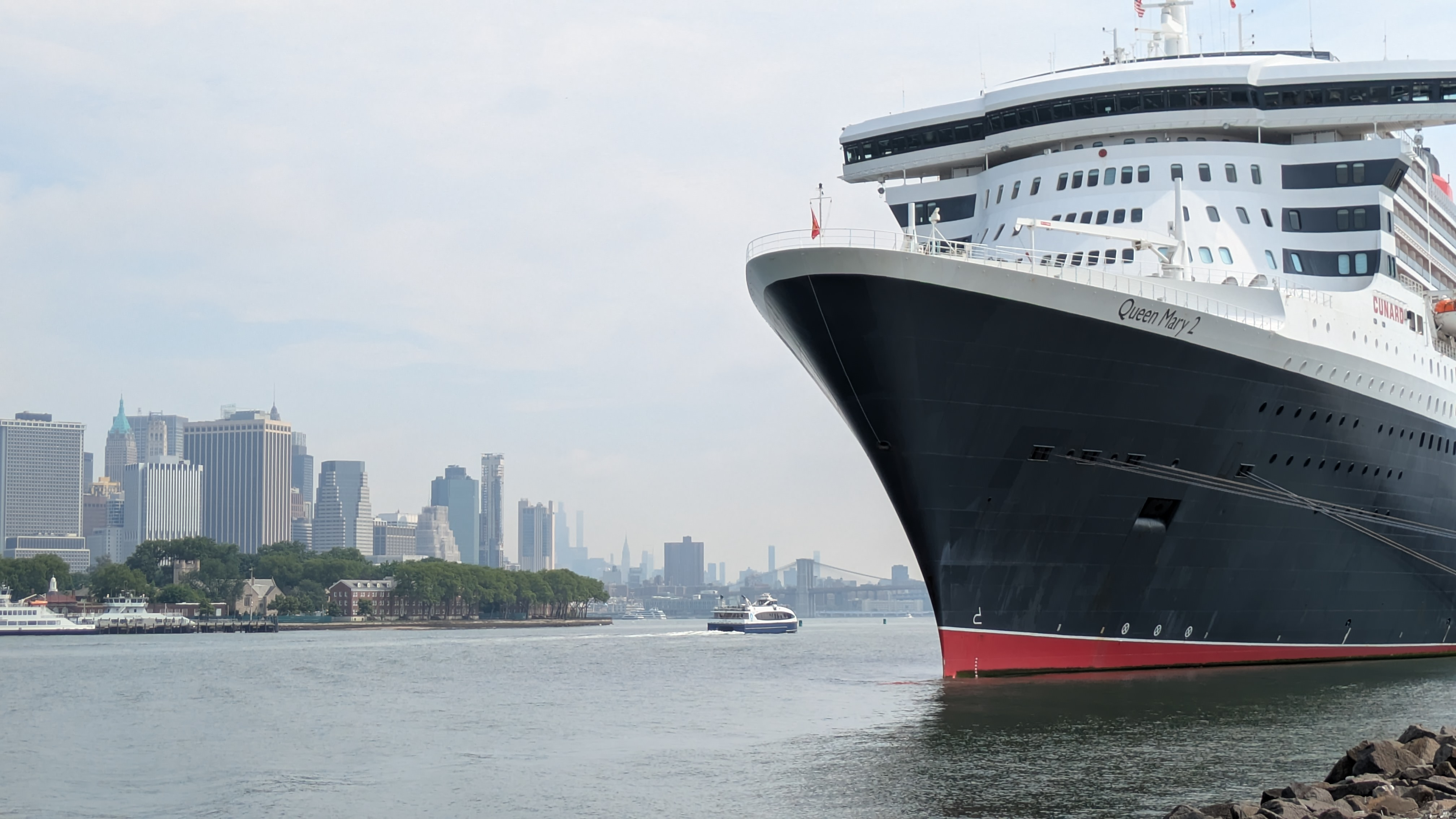
Queen Mary 2 berthed at the Red Hook cruise terminal in Brooklyn after the 185th anniversary crossing.

On 2 July 2015, Queen Mary 2 began a 175th Anniversary Crossing in Southampton. She sailed first to Liverpool, leaving that city after a fireworks display on 4 July, the actual anniversary date of Cunard's first transatlantic voyage. Queen Mary 2 followed the route of the original ship Britannia, calling first at Halifax, Nova Scotia. After a day there, she headed first upriver into the harbour, using her bow thrusters and swivel-pod motors to negotiate the tight turnaround to come back down close to the city front. A 21-gun salute and bagpipe band honored the ship. From Halifax, the ship sailed to Boston and was there for a full day at the cruise terminal (Boston was the terminus of the original crossing in 1840). In the evening the ship backed out into Boston Harbor, where a fireworks display was presented before Queen Mary 2 sailed away. After a night and day at sea, the vessel entered New York Harbour early the morning of 14 July and docked at the Brooklyn Cruise Terminal. Later in the evening the vessel sailed to the lower harbour, between the Statue of Liberty and the Battery, for the Forever Cunard Queen Mary 2 Light Show. On 24 June 2025, Queen Mary 2 departed Southampton on a crossing to New York commemorating Cunard's 185th anniversary.

In August 2019, Queen Mary 2 was the primary setting for the 2020 film Let Them All Talk by Steven Soderbergh. Filming lasted two weeks as Queen Mary 2 made two transatlantic crossings. Most of the film takes place aboard the ship.

Queen Mary 2's 2026 World Voyage contained several historic events. On 24–25 January 2026, she made her first-ever transit of the Panama Canal, which only became possible after the canal's expansion in 2016. One week later, on 2 February 2026, she reunited with RMS Queen Mary for the first time in 20 years for a "Royal Rendezvous" and to celebrate the 90th anniversary of Queen Mary's maiden voyage. Like the 2006 event, a fireboat was present, and the two Queens exchanged a whistle salute heard throughout Long Beach.

=== 2016 refit ===
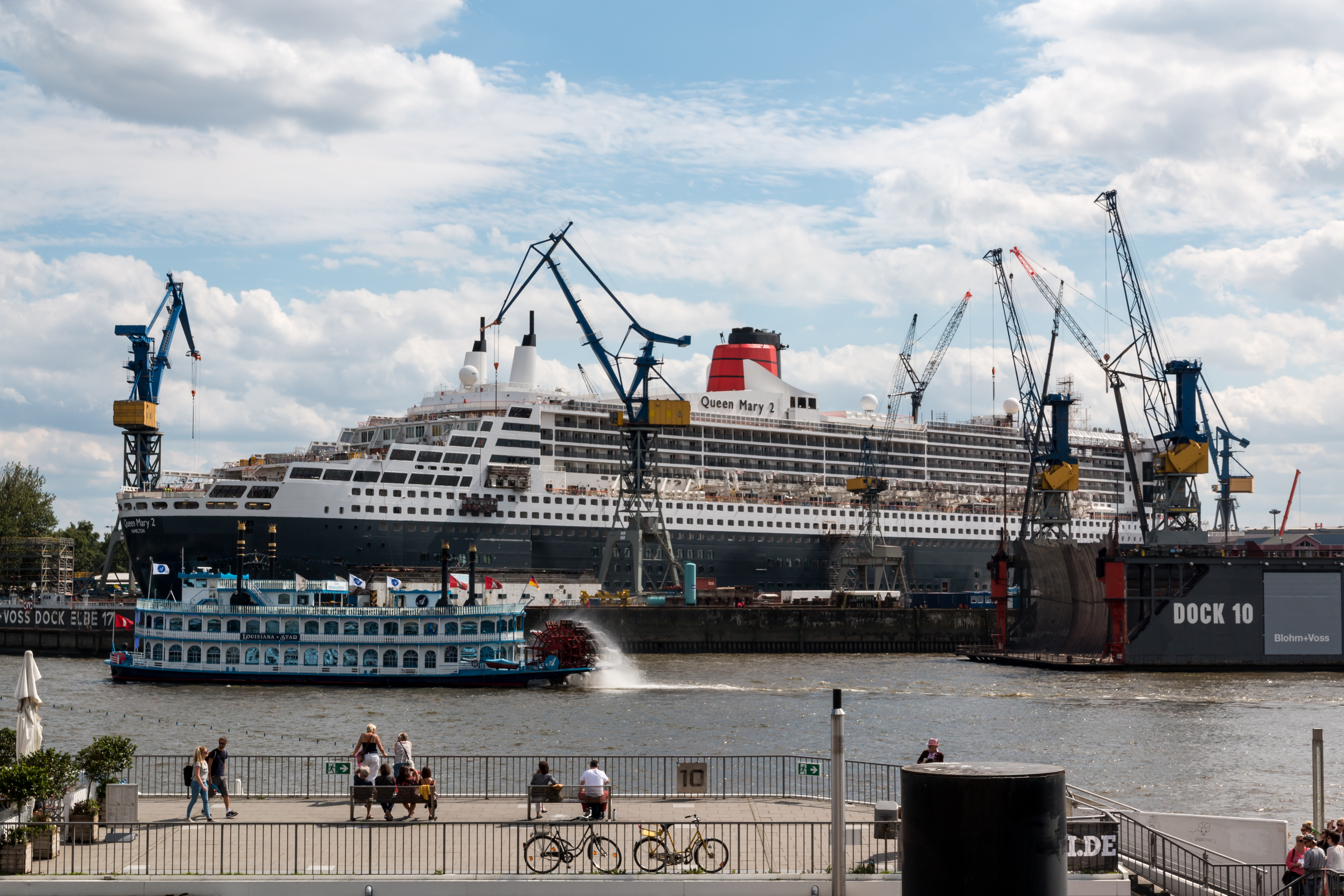
Queen Mary 2 during 2016 refit in Hamburg

In June 2016, Queen Mary 2 underwent a $132 million/£90 million renovation at Blohm+Voss over 25 days. Major changes included the addition of fifteen single-occupancy staterooms, additional balcony staterooms, and ten more animal cages for an enlarged kennels. According to Blohm+Voss, the refit included the installation of exhaust gas scrubbers and filters to reduce emissions. A block of 35 new cabins was added to the top of the ship that took the place of a little-used deck-top area that offered tennis courts, a wading pool, and two hot tubs. A majority of the loose furniture was replaced in public venues. Other modifications included the removal of the panoramic glass lifts in the Grand Foyer, reconfiguration of the King's Court, the infill of the port promenade photogallery with single staterooms, and the addition of single staterooms in a portion of the casino.

=== Lay-up during pandemic ===
When the COVID-19 pandemic started to spread around the world in 2020, Queen Mary 2 was in the midst of a world cruise. In early February, Cunard cancelled the Asian leg of the voyage, and the vessel stopped in Singapore only to refuel and sailed to Australia. On 15 March, Cunard cancelled the remainder of the voyage, disembarked all passengers at Fremantle, and then the ship returned to Southampton. It stopped briefly on 2 April in Durban to disembark six South African crew members before continuing to its home port.

Due to the pandemic, Cunard suspended all voyages of the Queen Mary 2 until November 2021. In August 2021, Cunard announced that the ship would enter drydock in Brest, France, prior to her return to service.

On 28 November 2021, Queen Mary 2 returned to service during the pandemic.

=== 2023 refit ===
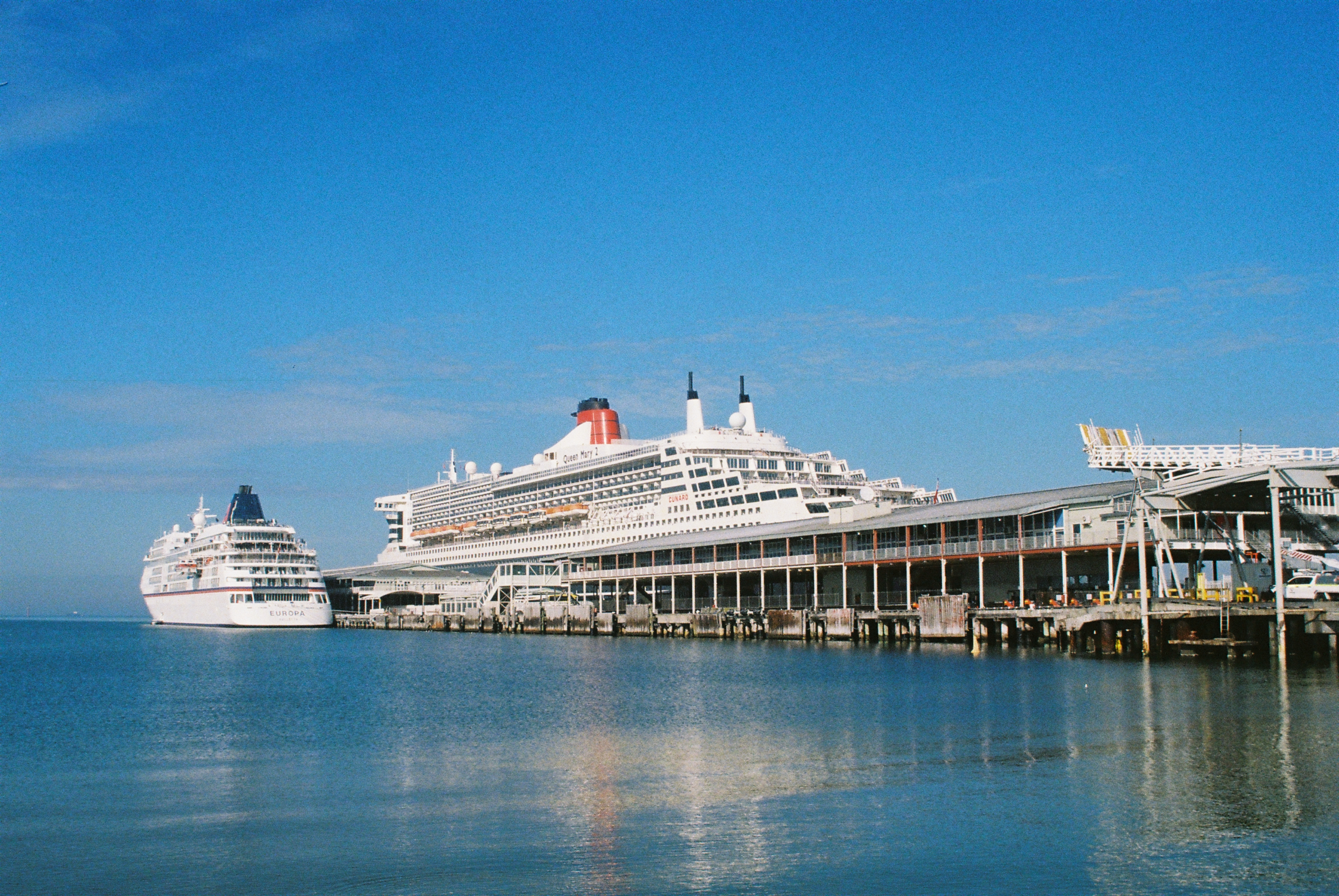
Queen Mary 2 and Europa Valletta sitting next to each other at Station Pier in Melbourne, Australia

In 2023, Queen Mary 2 was refitted in Rotterdam, which included replacement of carpets and finishings in many of the public areas.

=== 2027 refit ===
Queen Mary 2 is expected to undergo a significant refit between 31 March and 8 May 2027 at Damen Shiprepair Brest. Planned changes include:

- The addition of 16 Princess Grill and 5 Britannia inside cabins on deck 13;
- The addition of a sundeck on deck 14;
- The conversion of 18 deck 11 Britannia balcony cabins into Britannia Club balcony cabins;
- The removal and replacement of the Grills Concierge Lounge on deck 9 with four Britannia inside cabins;
- The reduction in size of the Kids and Teens Zone on deck to accommodate 4 new Britannia inside cabins;
- Updates to the Grills Cabins and restaurants and updates to select Britannia cabins;
- Updates to the Mareel Wellness and Beauty Spa;
- New boutique shops;
- Upgraded planetarium equipment in Illuminations;
- Increased kennel capacity, an updated pet owners lounge, and expanded outdoor areas for pets.

== Gallery ==
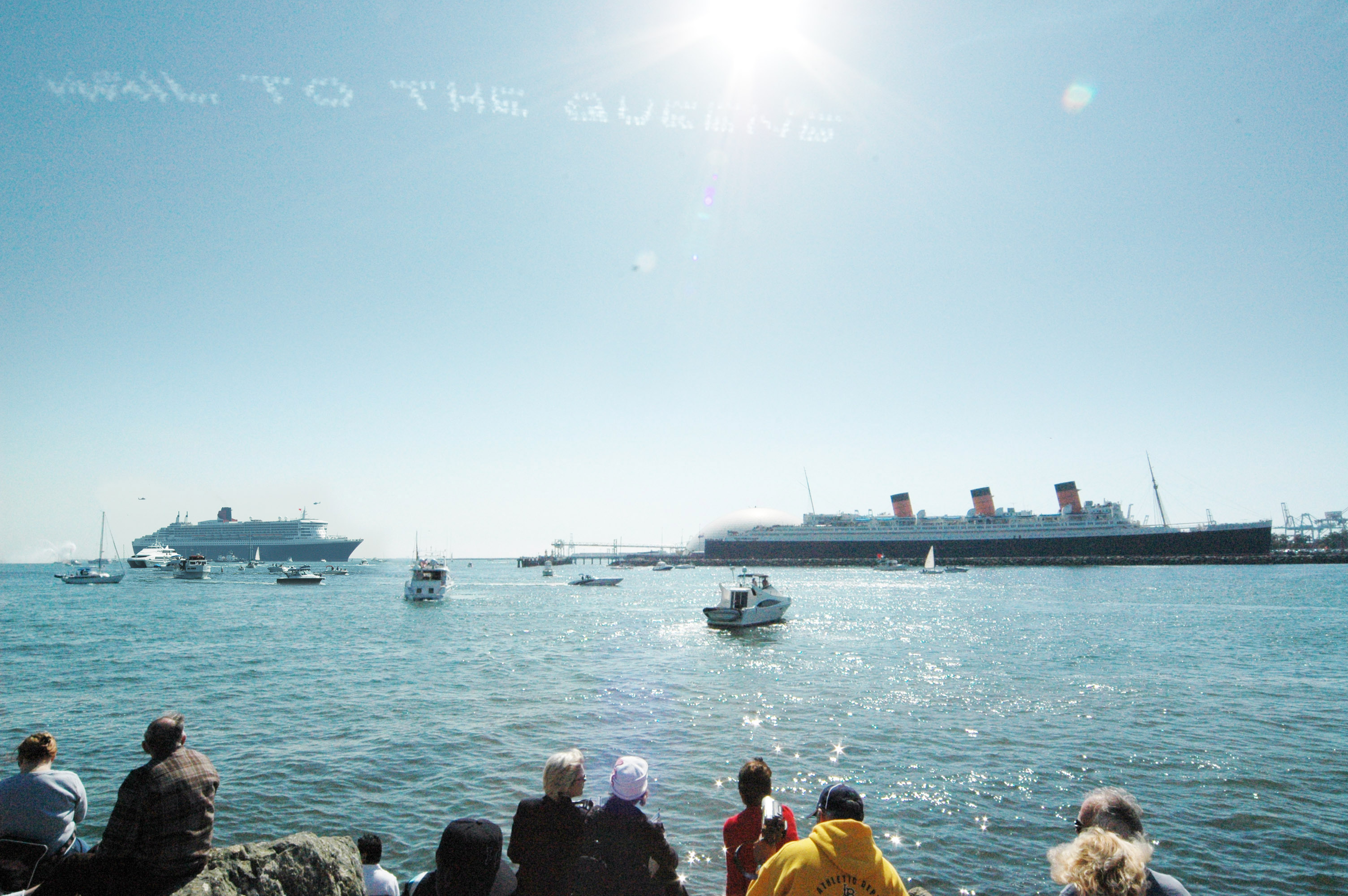
Queen Mary 2 meets the original RMS Queen Mary in February 2006

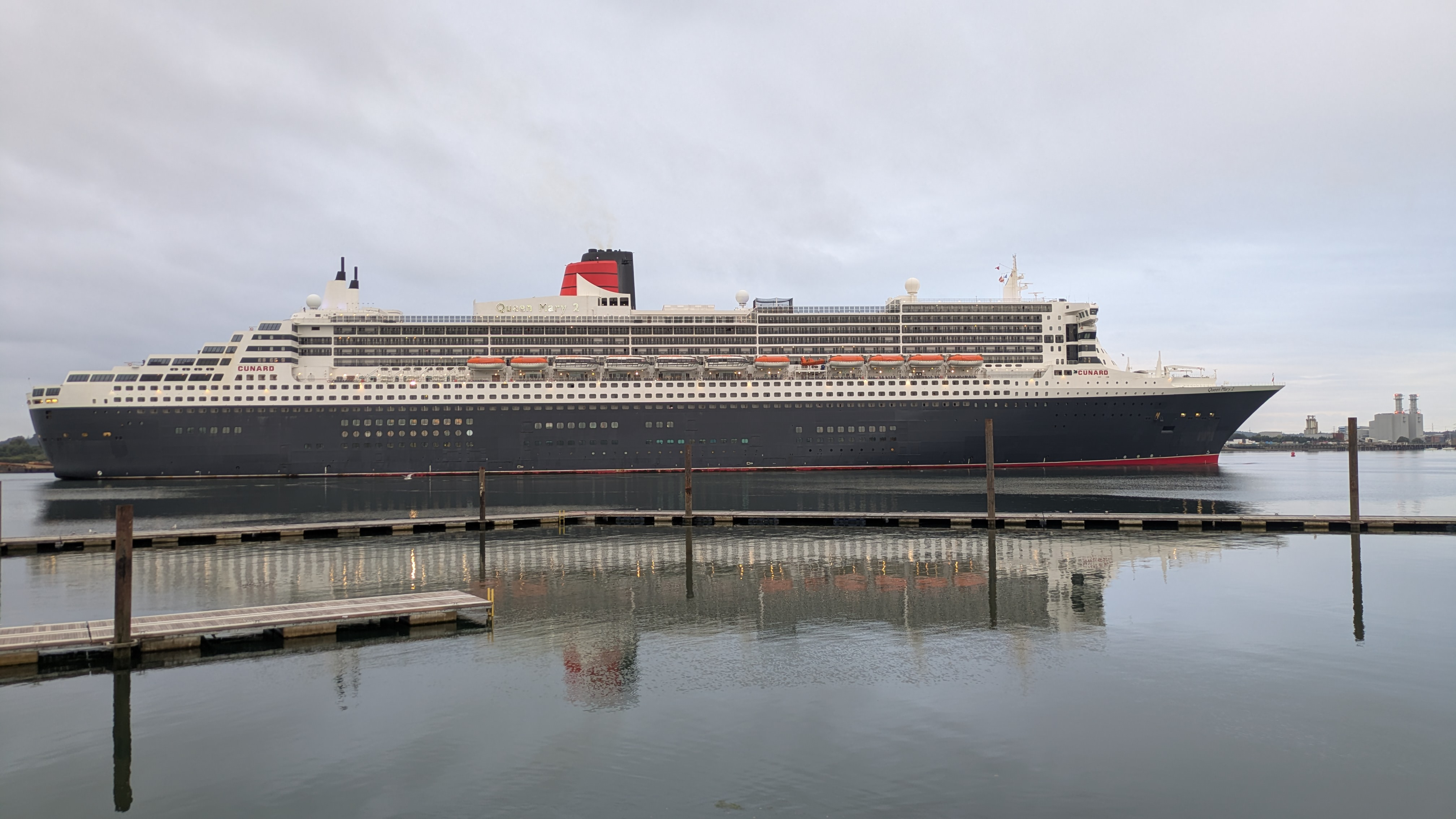

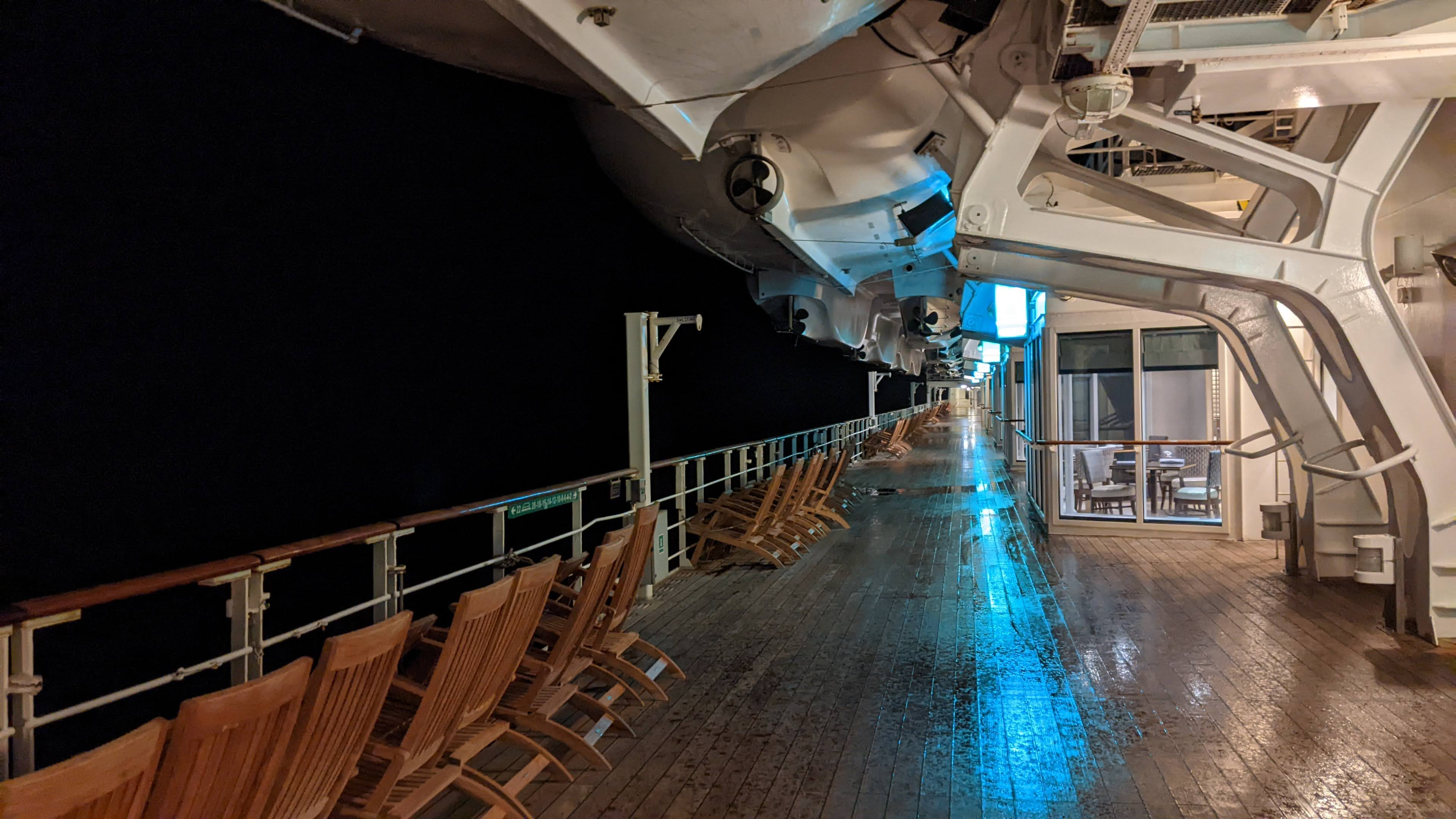

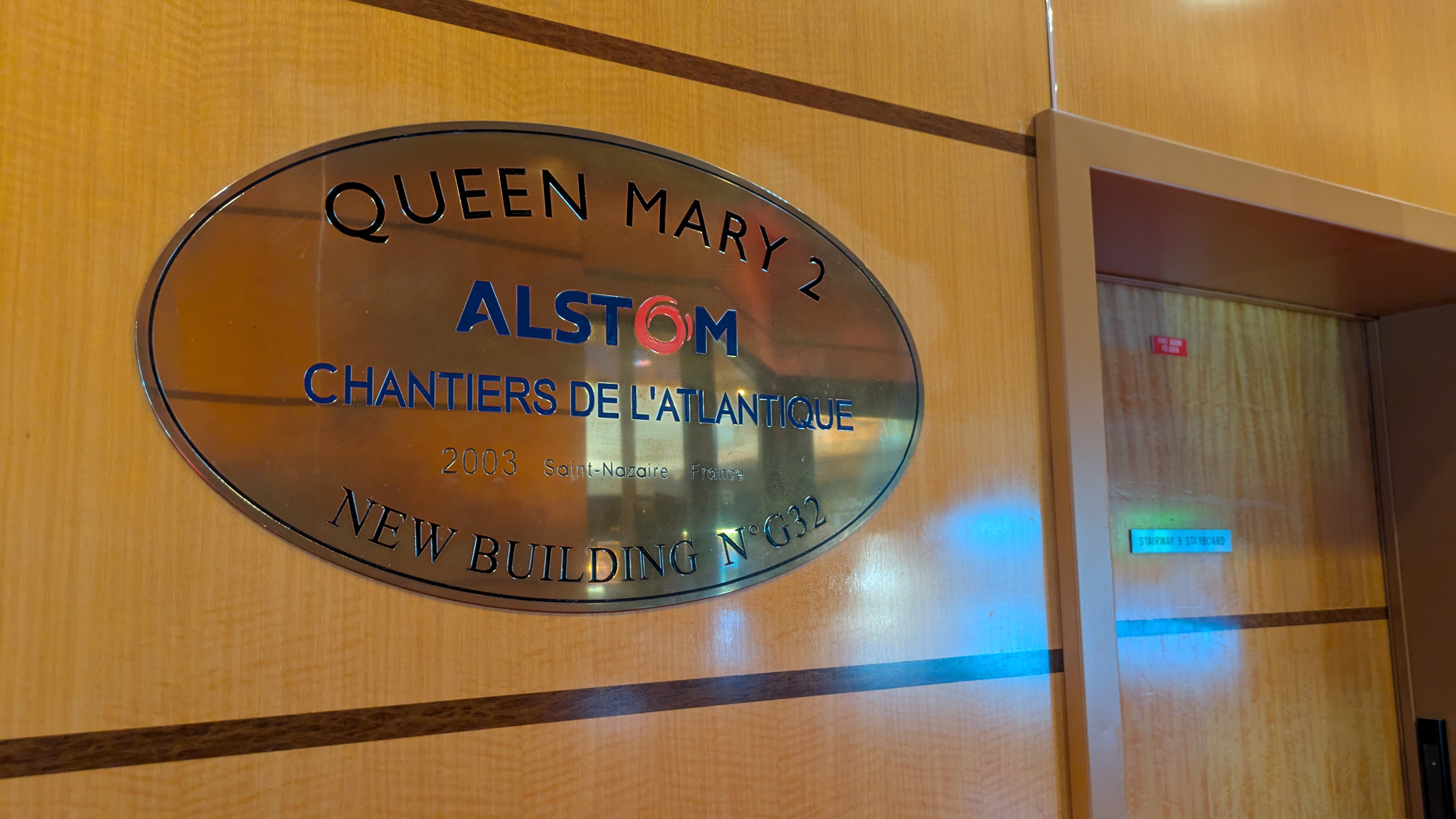

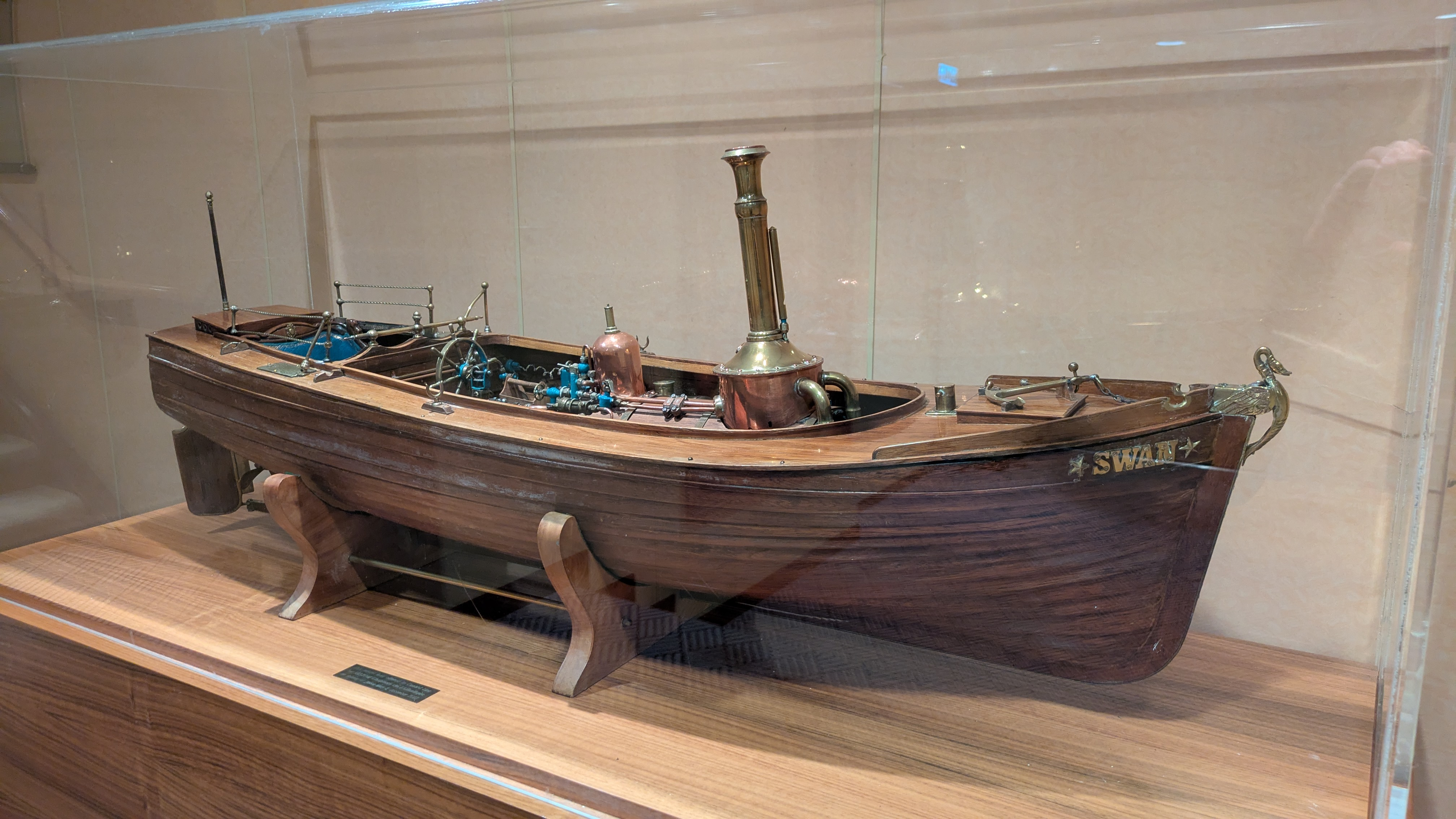

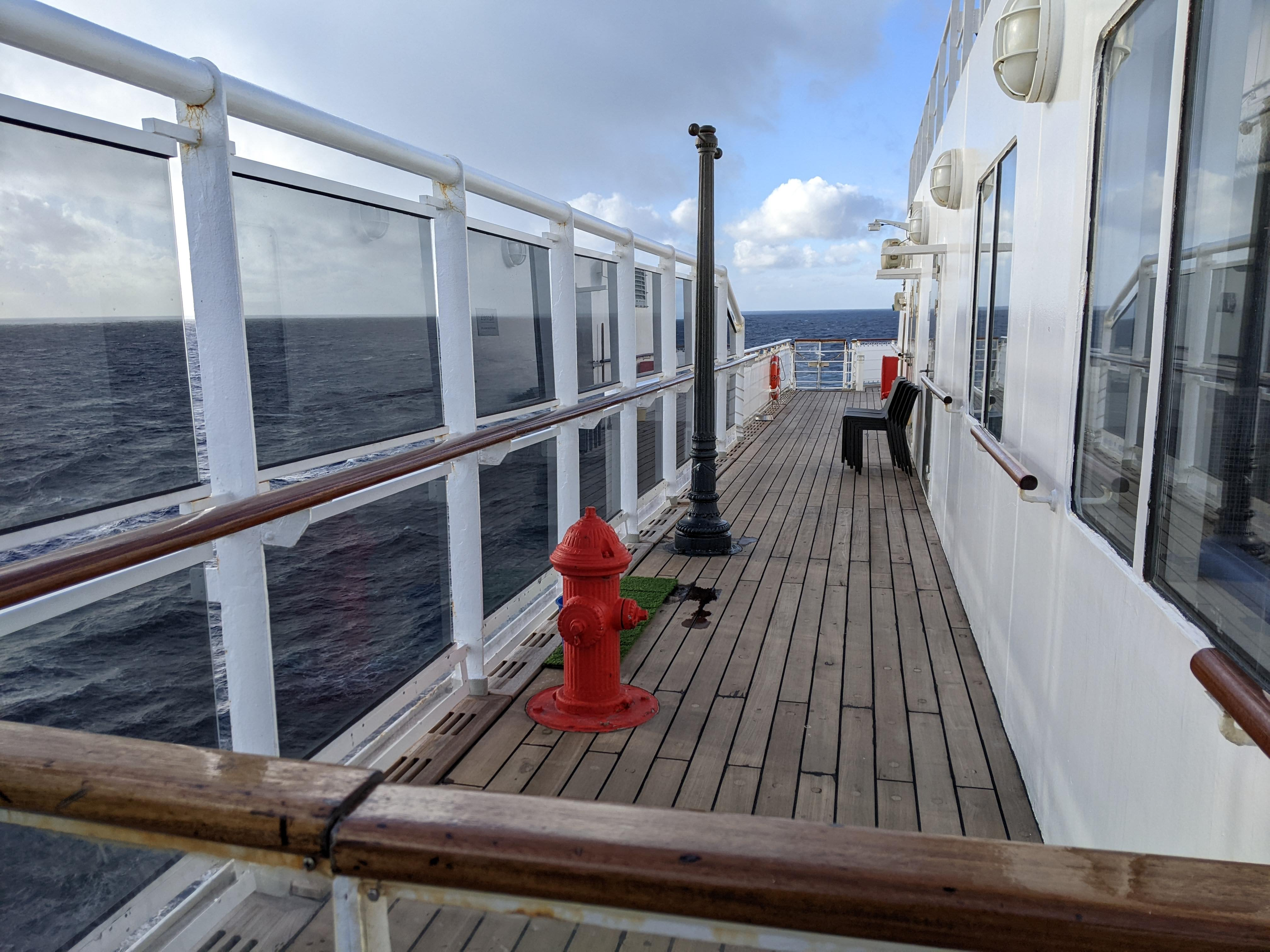

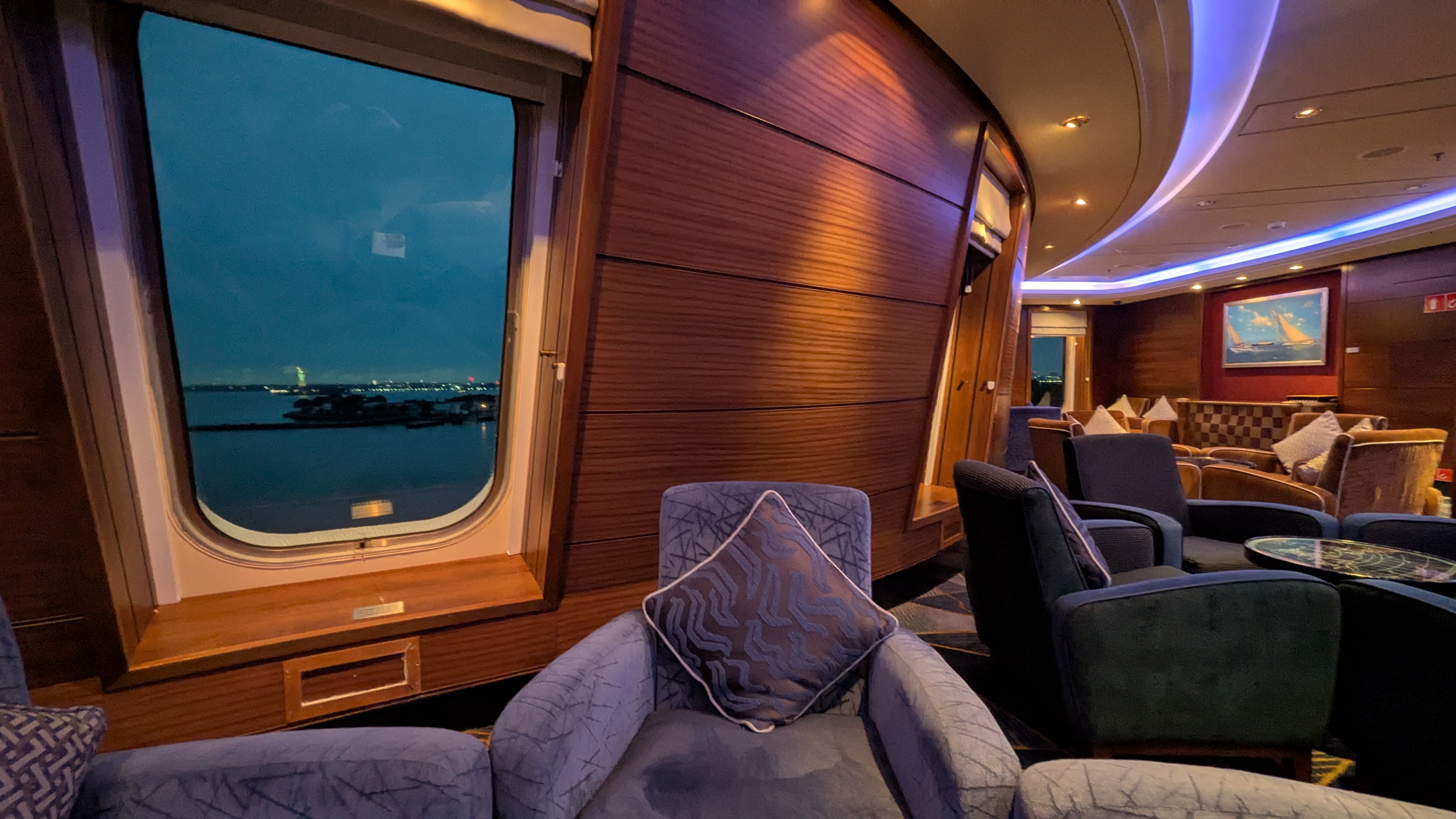

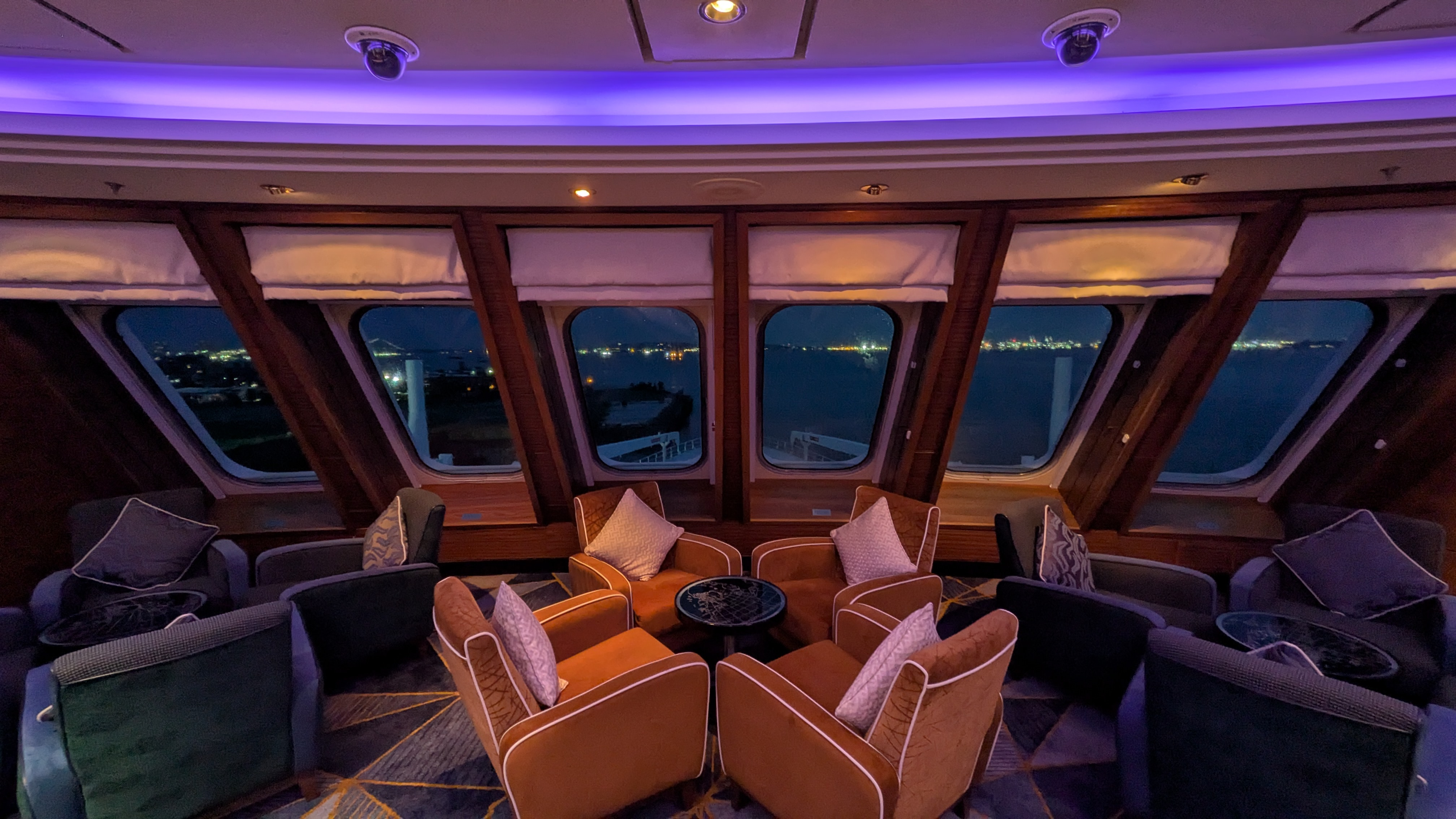

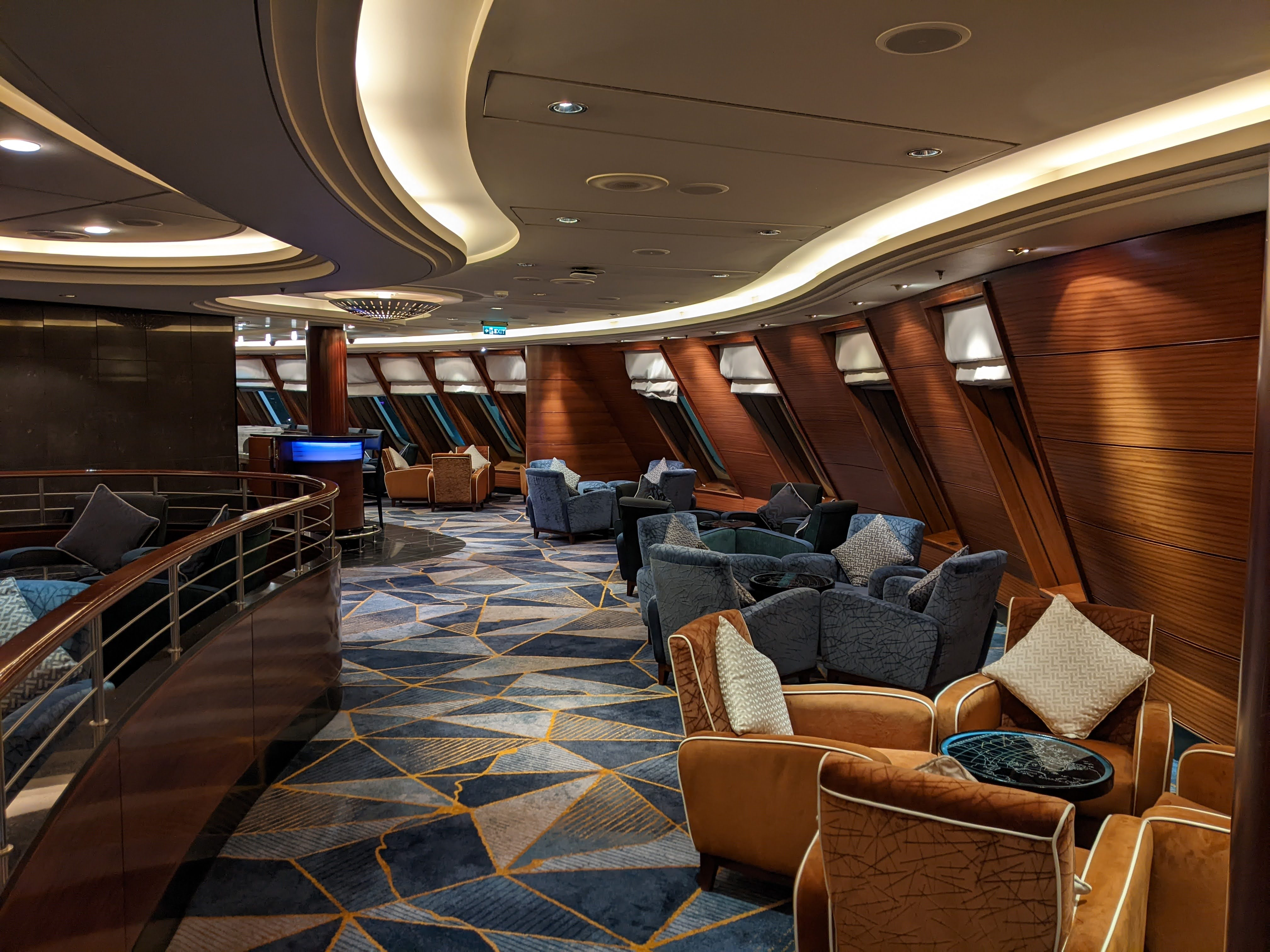

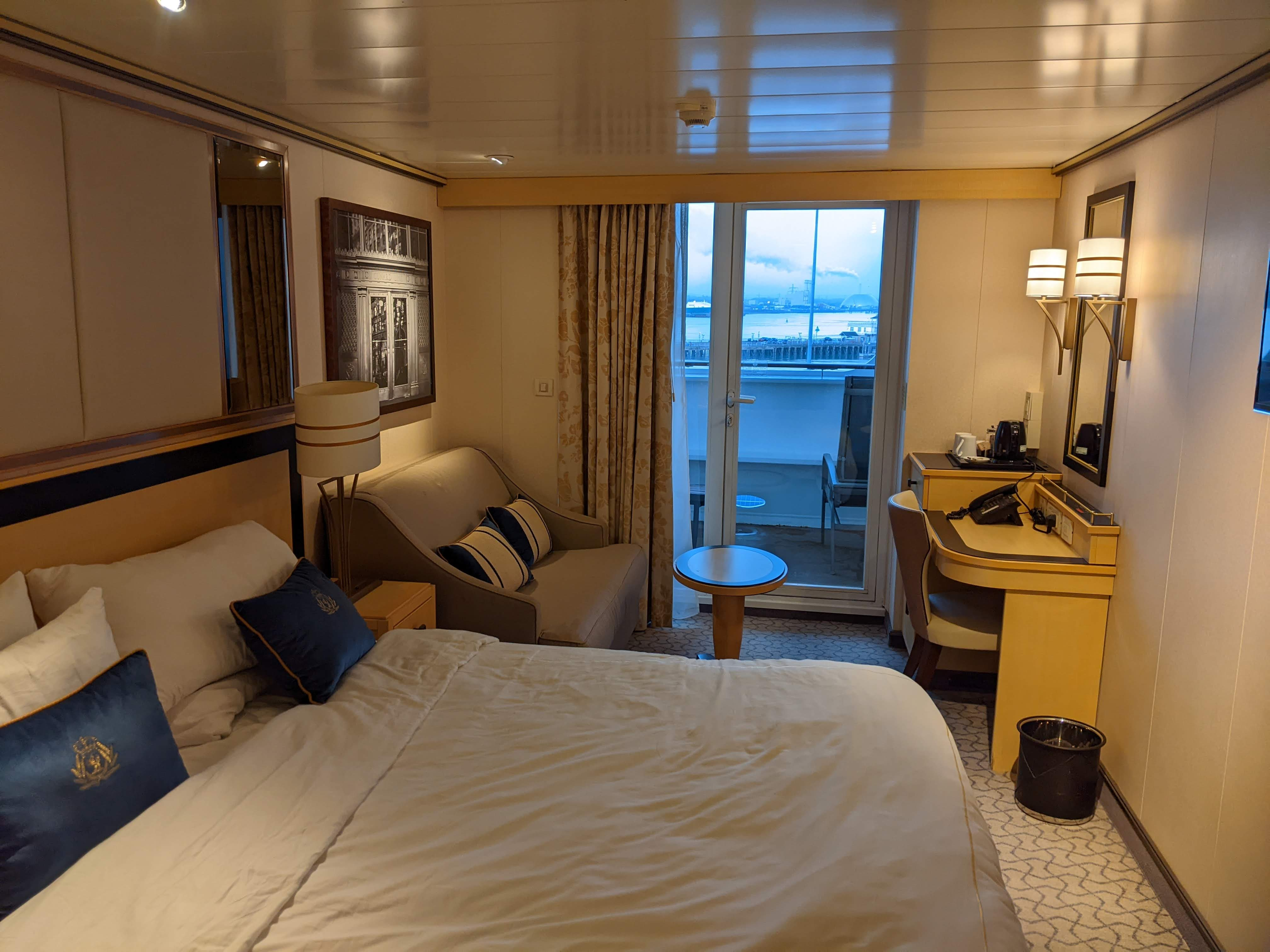

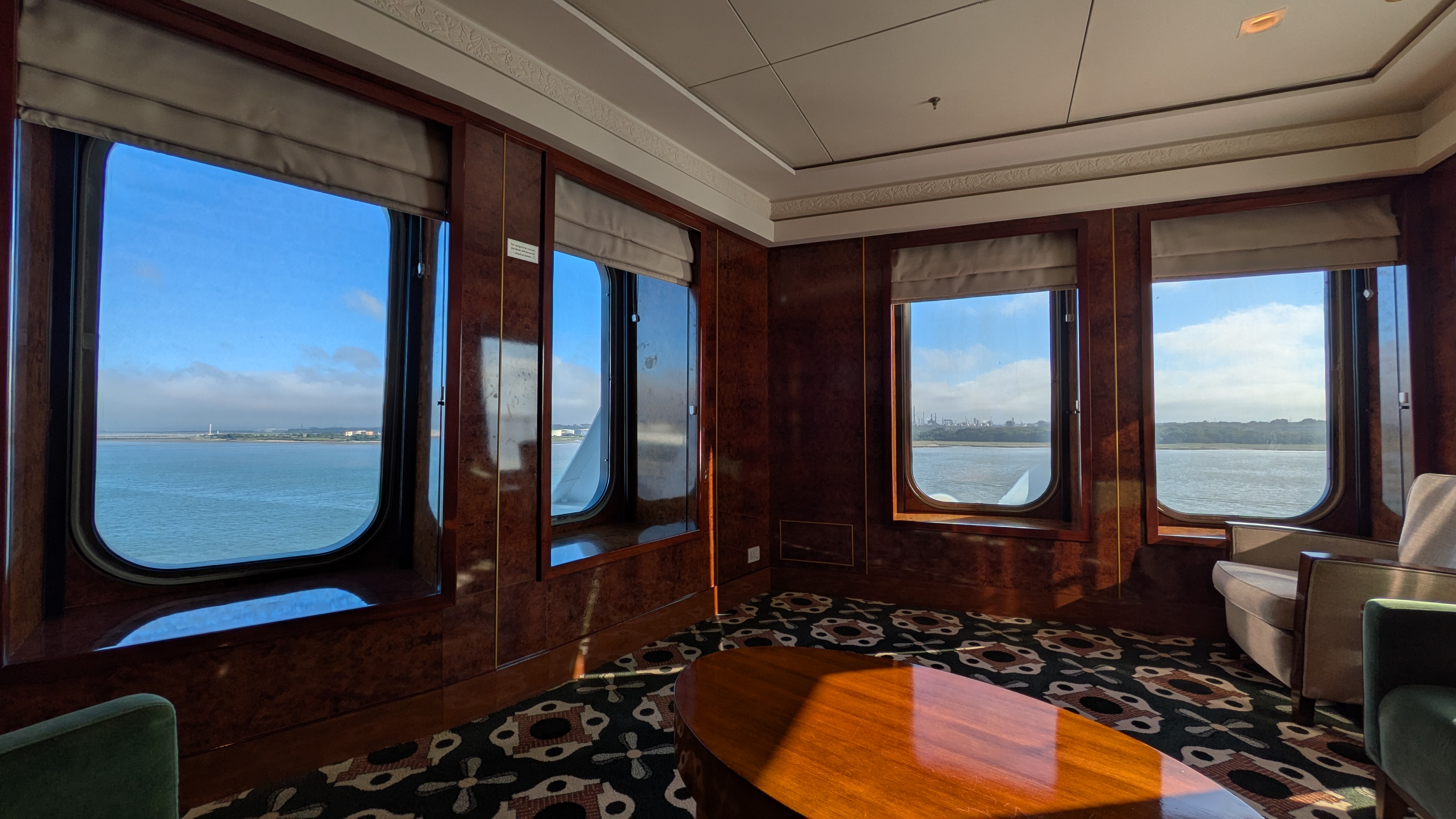

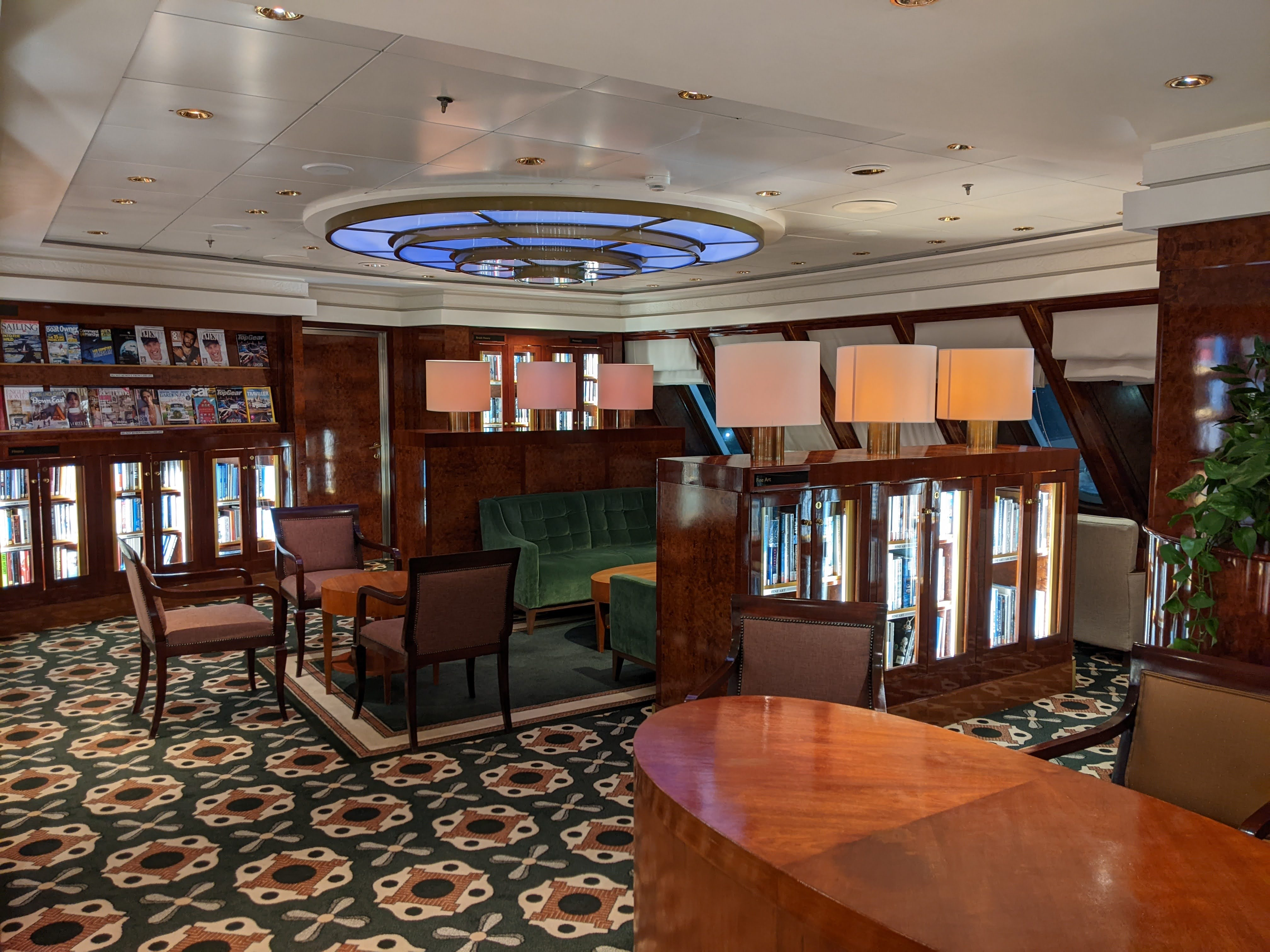

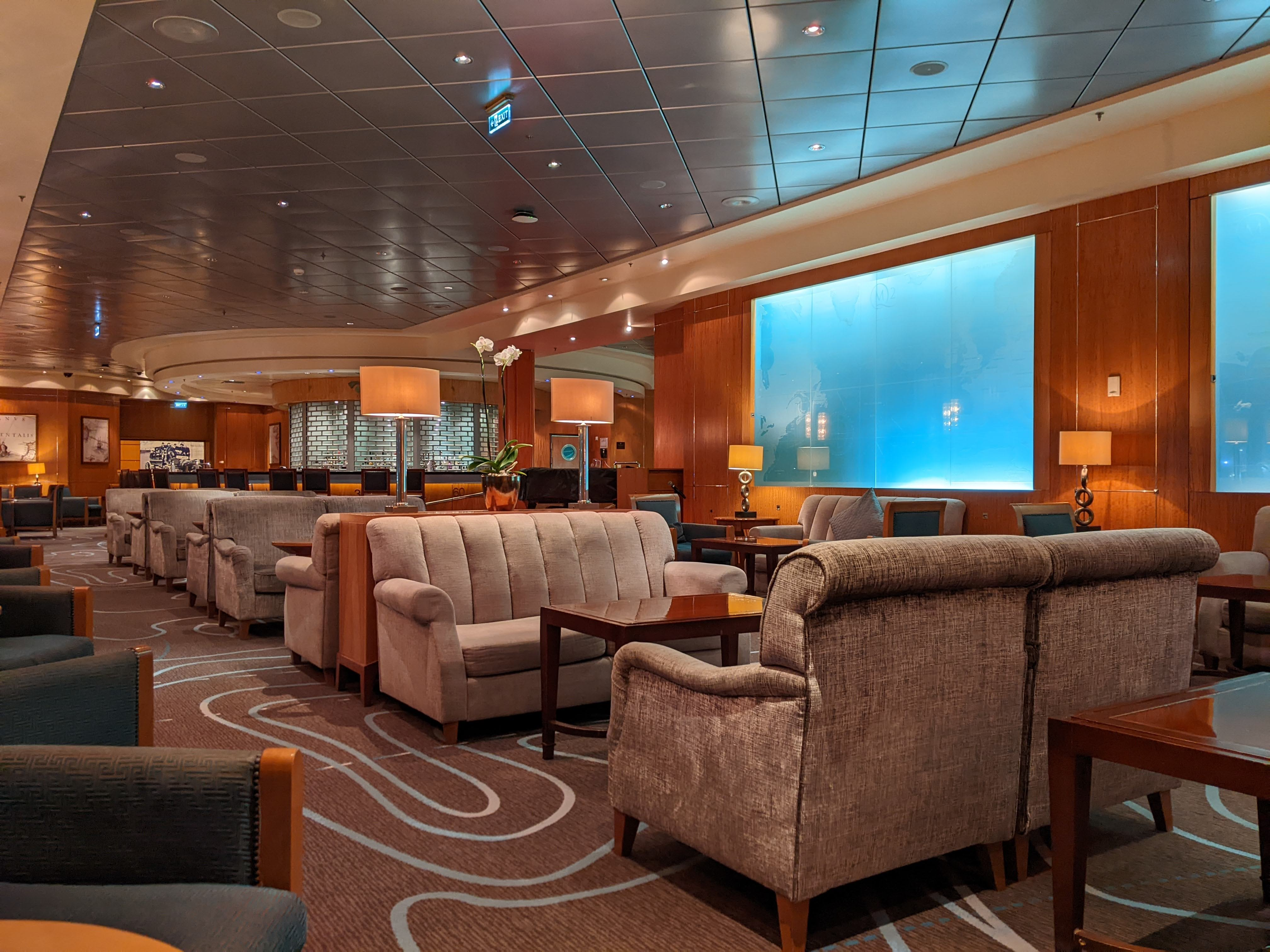

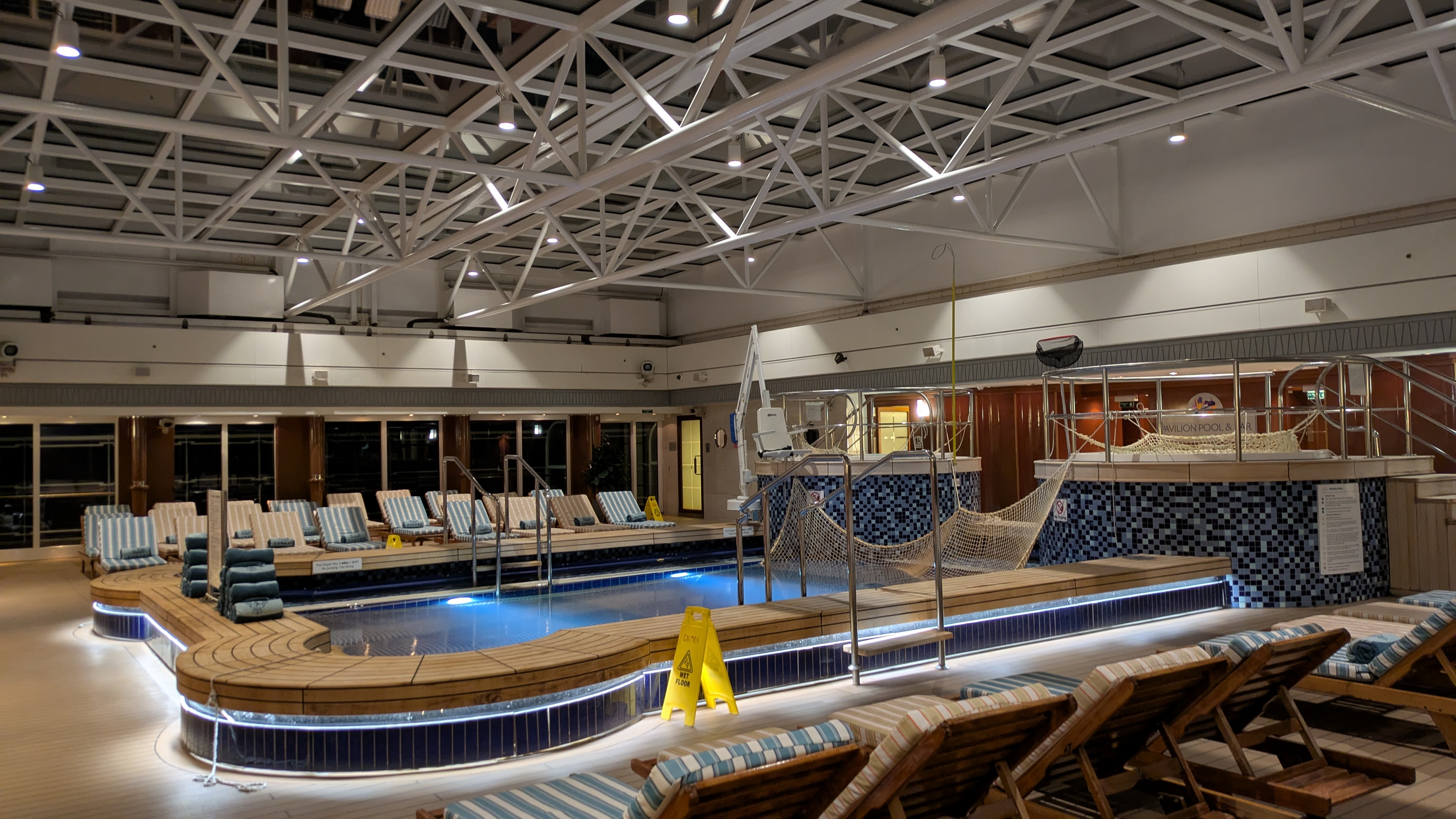

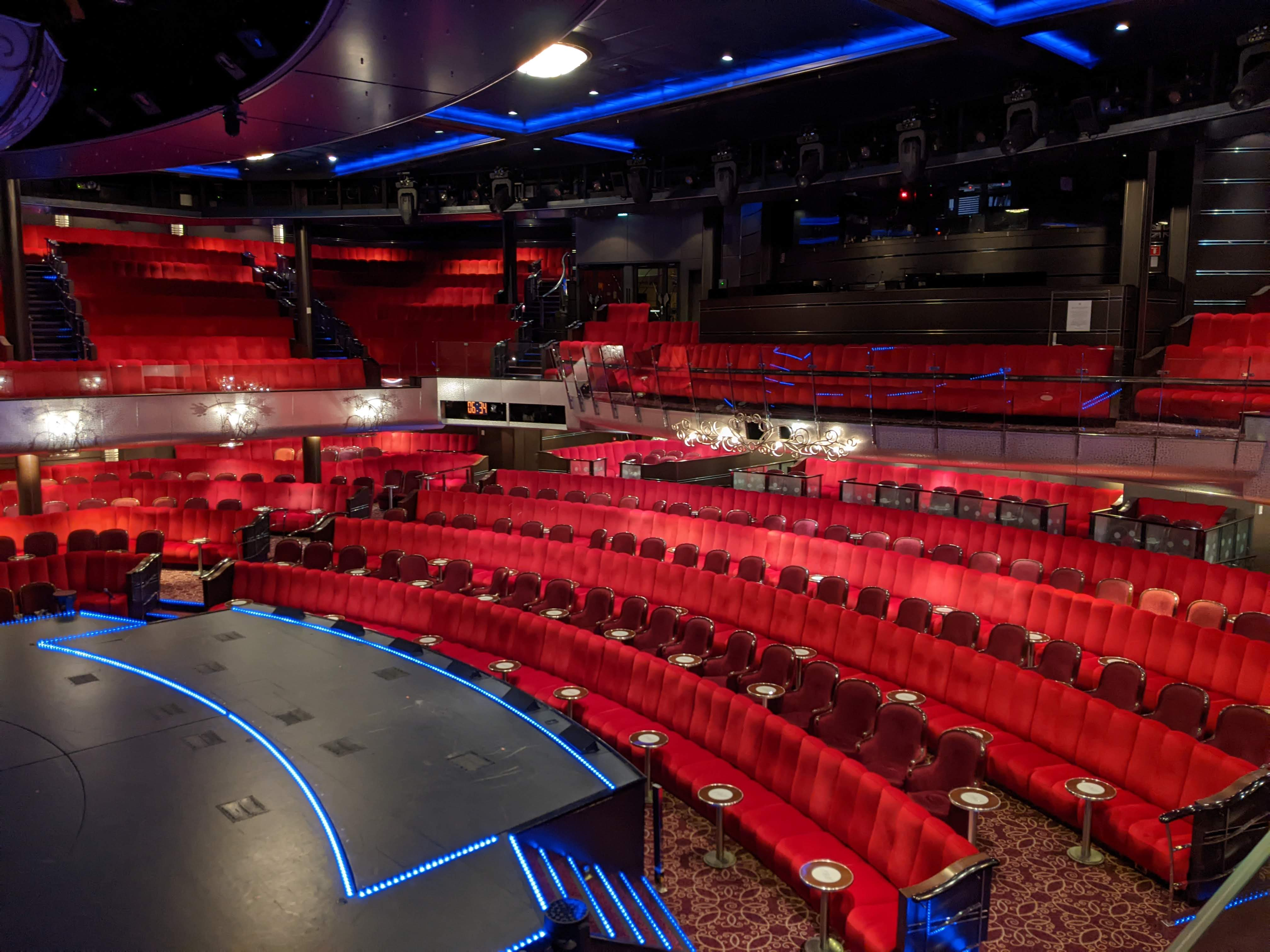

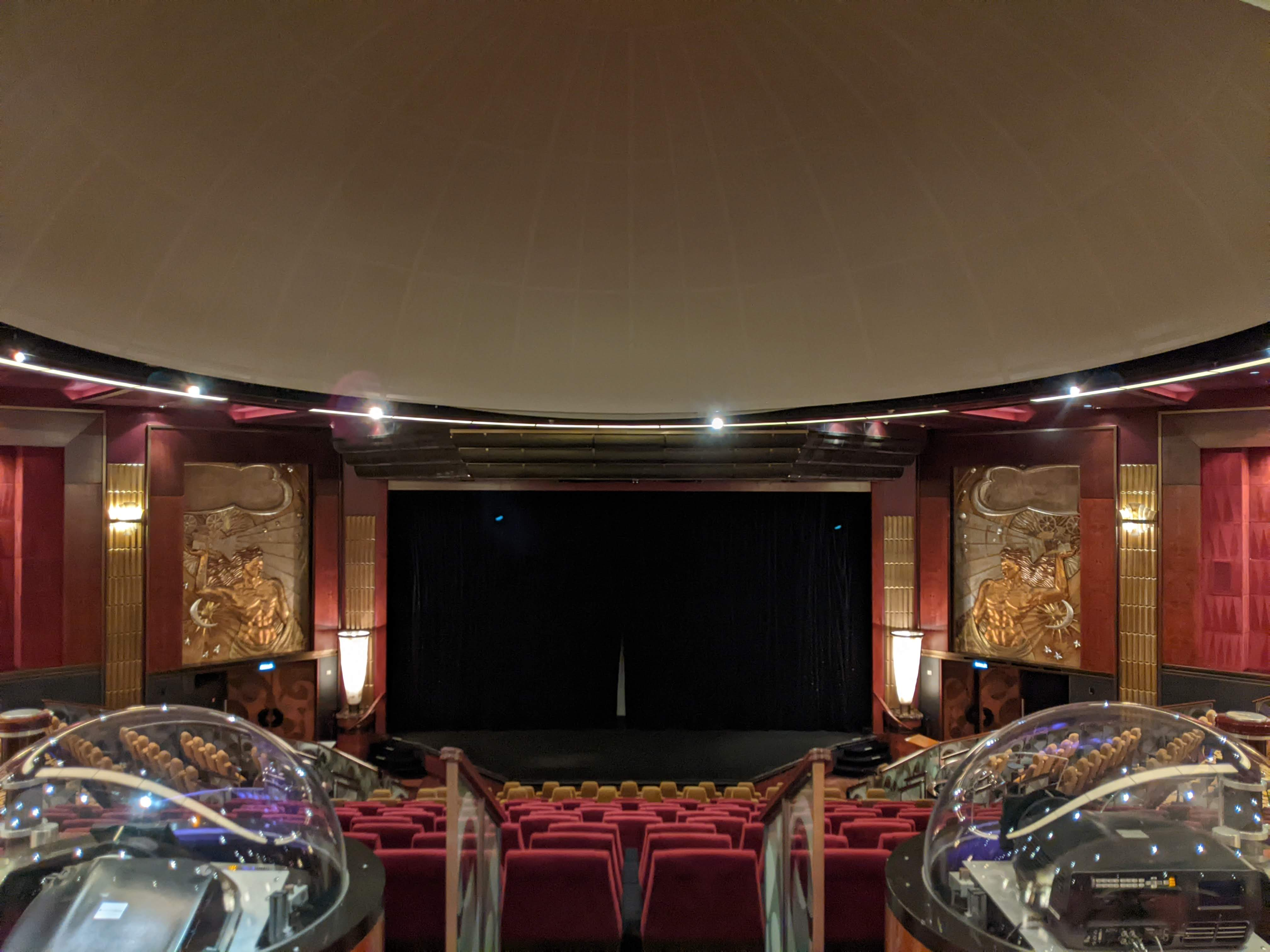
