= Mylène Paquette =

Canadian ocean rower and speaker

Mylène Paquette MSC (born 24 October 1978) is a Canadian ocean rower, speaker and author from Montreal, Quebec. In 2013 she became the first North American to row solo across the North Atlantic Ocean, travelling from Halifax, Canada, to Lorient, France.

== Rowing career ==
In 2010, Paquette was part of a six-person crew that rowed across the Atlantic from Agadir, Morocco, to Barbados in 58 days.

She left Halifax on 6 July 2013 in a 7.3-metre rowing boat, Hermel, and arrived in Lorient on 12 November 2013 after about 129 days at sea, covering roughly 2,700 nautical miles (5,000 km). In September, the remnants of Hurricane Humberto capsized her boat, and she lost equipment including her anchor and satellite phone. The crew of the ocean liner Queen Mary 2 supplied her with food, a replacement satellite phone and two anchors. Paquette said the main aim of the crossing was to raise awareness of the fragility of ocean ecosystems.

== Later activities ==
Paquette has since worked as a public speaker and wrote Dépasser l'horizon (English: Beyond the Horizon), an account of the crossing. She is also an ice-canoe racer and was named an Explorer-in-Residence of the Royal Canadian Geographical Society in May 2018.

== Honours ==
- Personality of the Year, Radio-Canada and La Presse (2013)
- Meritorious Service Cross (Civil Division), awarded 29 September 2015
