= Don Lennox (rower) =

Don Lennox

Don Lennox (born 1967) is a Guinness World Record holding Scottish ocean rower. Born in Lanark, Scotland, Lennox worked as an architectural model-maker before returning to school at the age of 30 to qualify in Sports Therapy at the City of Glasgow College. Since then, he has worked in the fitness industry as a personal trainer, professional sports team therapist/trainer, and gym owner/manager. Lennox is an ultra runner and ocean rower.

== 2010 Expedition - Artemis Investments North Atlantic Record Row ==
Lennox rowed with a four-man crew in 2010 and broke a 114-year-old ocean rowing record. Lennox, along with Skipper Leven Brown and fellow crewmembers Livar Nysted and Ray Carroll, rowed 3,000 miles (4,800 km) unsupported across the North Atlantic from New York to the Isles of Scilly in a time of 43 days, 21 hours, 26 minutes, and 48 seconds. The previous record was set in 1896 by two Norwegian men, George Harbo and Frank Samuelsen, when they crossed the Atlantic in 55 days.

== 2009 Expedition - 'Trade Winds' Row ==
In 2009, Lennox and skipper Leven Brown rowed together again on the 14-man 'La Mondiale'. The expedition was an attempt to beat the Atlantic crossing record set by their crew on 'La Mondiale' the previous year. The voyage was aborted due to damage sustained to the ship and all crew were safely evacuated onto the bulk carrier 'Island Ranger'. 'La Mondiale' was lost at sea.

== 2007/08 Expedition - 'La Mondiale' Record Row ==
Lennox achieved an earlier ocean rowing record on the 2007/08 voyage of the ocean rowing boat ‘La Mondiale’ from Puerta De Mogan, Gran Canaria to Port St. Charles, Barbados. Also skippered by Leven Brown, this fourteen-man crew set the record for the fastest rowing boat to cross the Atlantic Ocean at 33 days, 7 hours, and 30 minutes. At that time, the record had stood for 16 years but has since been broken by the ‘Sara G’ in 2010.

== Other Expeditions ==
On 3 September 2011, Lennox set off on the Transcontinental Challenge 2011 in an attempt to break the record for the fastest crossing of America on foot set by Frank Giannino in 1980. Despite injuries, an early winter, and financial hardship, he made it to the halfway point (McCook, Nebraska) before his VISA expired. In August 2013, Lennox will re-attempt the 3,100 miles (5,000 km) world record run from San Francisco to New York.
