= Kelsey Pfendler =

American ocean rower and record holder (born c. 2000s)

- Born: United States
- Occupations: Ocean rower; River guide; Emergency room technician
- Known for: Fastest solo row from California to Hawaii (2026); First American woman and youngest person to complete the solo Mid-Pacific crossing

Kelsey Pfendler is an American ocean rower and Colorado River guide who, in July 2026, set the fastest known time for a solo row from California to Hawaii, completing the Mid-Pacific crossing in 43 days, 17 hours, and 15 minutes. She became the first American woman and the youngest person to complete the solo crossing, and the third woman overall to do so, after Roz Savage and Lia Ditton.

== Early life and background ==
Pfendler began her maritime career as a raft guide at the age of 18. Since 2018, she has worked as a boatman leading multi-day whitewater trips on the Colorado River in the Grand Canyon. During the river-guiding off-season, she has worked as an emergency room technician.

== Ocean crossings ==
=== The Atlantic (2020) ===
In 2020, Pfendler crossed the Atlantic Ocean by sail with four other people.

=== Competitive rafting ===
Pfendler competed on the USA Women's Open Raft Race Team and represented the United States in the World Rafting Championships, held in Bosnia and Herzegovina in 2022.

=== The Mid-Pacific (2024) ===
Pfendler completed her second ocean crossing in 2024, rowing across the Mid-Pacific Ocean as skipper of the World’s Toughest Row - Pacific expedition.

=== Solo Mid-Pacific record row (2026) ===
Her 2026 solo row from California to Hawaii began on Thursday, May 21, when she departed from Monterey, California. Pfendler rowed solo aboard a 24-foot ocean rowing boat, navigating the Mid-Pacific without motorised assistance.

She finished on July 4, 2026, at 12:54 a.m. MT (11:54 p.m. PST on July 3), docking at Ala Wai Harbor in Honolulu, setting a new fastest known time for the California–Hawaii solo ocean row. Her time of 43 days, 17 hours, and 55 minutes surpassed the previous overall record of 52 days, 13 hours, and 17 minutes set by Rob Eustace in 2014, as well as the women's record of 86 days, 10 hours, and 5 minutes set by Lia Ditton in 2020. She became the first American woman, the youngest person, and the third woman overall to complete the solo Mid-Pacific crossing, following Roz Savage and Ditton.
