= Ray Carroll =

Ray Carroll may refer to:

- Ray Carroll (rower)
- Ray Carroll (rugby union)

== See also ==
- Raymond J. Carroll, American statistician
