= Don Lennox =

Don Lennox may refer to:

- Don Lennox (Shortland Street), a character on the TV series Shortland Street
- Don Lennox (rower) (born 1967), Scottish ocean rower
