= Lia Ditton =

British sailor and adventurer (born 1980)

Aurelia M. Ditton (born 1980), known professionally as Lia Ditton, is a British professional yachtswoman, ocean rower, speaker, author and conceptual artist.

Ditton is a celebrated long-distance sea-farer.

In her first solo crossing of the Atlantic under sail in 2005, aged 25, Ditton was the youngest competitor and only woman to finish the O.S.T.A.R. (Original Single-Handed Trans-Atlantic Race). Ditton finished 4th in the multihull class after 27 days 9 hours and 19 minutes alone at sea.

In 2020, Ditton broke two Guinness World Records by rowing solo from the US mainland to Hawaii. She completed the journey in 86 days, 10 hours and 5 minutes, becoming the youngest and fastest woman to row the mid-Pacific Ocean.

== Early life ==
Ditton lived her first nine years in Lewisham, South London. When Ditton was ten her family moved to Playford, Suffolk. There she attended Woodbridge School.

In her youth, she wanted to be an artist. She was passionate about sculpture in particular and a huge follower of the Young British Artist or YBA movement, in the 90s. By late 1999, Ditton had grown disillusioned with conceptual art and so set off for India to learn to carve stone. Ditton travelled on to Asia and in Thailand responded to an advert looking for crew to sail back to Europe via the Red Sea. This ocean voyage set the bar for many to come.

After taking a 4-year sabbatical between her first and second year, Ditton graduated with a BA (Honours) degree in Fine Art from Chelsea College of Arts, part of the University of the Arts London. In 2012, she earned an M.A in Professional Writing from University College Falmouth.

== Professional sailing ==
Ditton's first experience of winning yacht races as a professional sailor was on board the TP52 Rosebud, for the duration of the Caribbean circuit in 2003.

In 2007, Ditton raced the Transpacific Yacht Race (known as the Transpac) on board the trimaran LoeReal. The boat was originally built for the 1995 movie Waterworld starring Kevin Costner. LoeReal was the 1st trimaran across the line and 3rd boat to finish, crossing with an elapsed time of 205:27:12.

Ditton skippered the boat back to San Diego, California and project managed the boat's race program through 2008.

=== Single-handed yacht racing ===
Ditton's first transatlantic crossing was on board the famous Moxie (trimaran) in 2002. Ditton and crew survived the category-1 hurricane Hurricane Kyle, which also decimated the fleet of the Route du Rhum. Moxie was forced to pitstop for repairs in the Azores, where Marc Guillemot, frontrunner of the trimaran fleet in the Route du Rhum, was also forced to stop for repairs.

Inspired by this chance meeting, Ditton went on to race the next edition of single-handed transatlantic race, Route du Rhum in 2006. The Route du Rhum was Ditton's second transatlantic single-handed yacht race. Ditton came 2nd in class 2 for monohulls, with a crossing time of 25 days 2 hours 26 minutes in her 40-foot boat named Dangerous When Wet.

Ditton was one of 5 women of 74 entrants to enter the 2006 Route du Rhum. Prior to 2006 and since the first edition of the race in 1978 only 7 women total had raced in the Route du Rhum, with 4 completing the course: Florence Arthaud (in 1978, 1982, 1986 and 1990), Aline Marchand (1978), Ellen MacArthur (1998, 2002) and Anne Caseneuve (1998, 2002).

During the transatlantic race, Ditton penned the diary of her experience on the inside skin of the boat itself. After completing the race, her intention was to cut the boat in half, from bow to stern and exhibit the boat as two giant half-hulls; displaying half in a museum in England and the other half in an art gallery in South America.

The boat sold complete with diary inside. On 14 May 2007, the boat was abandoned and presumed sunk, circa 100 miles south of Bermuda while en route to be sliced into half-hulls.

== Ocean rowing ==
Ditton is the 53rd woman to row the Atlantic Ocean, the 64th woman to row any ocean, the 2nd woman to row the mid-Pacific Ocean solo and the mid-Pacific route's current speed record-holder.

Ditton was introduced to the sport of Ocean rowing in 2008, by an Olympic hopeful rower from Copenhagen.

Two years later, Ditton rowed the Atlantic as part of the Woodvale Atlantic Rowing Race, which departs La Gomera in the Canary Islands, for Antigua in the Caribbean.

Twenty boats rowed by two people set off on 4 January 2010. Ditton and her rowing partner finished 5th in class. They arrived in Jolly Harbour, Antigua after 72 days, 23 hours and 29 minutes at sea, becoming the 10th male-female pair to row the Atlantic in the history of ocean rowing.

Adam Rackley and his rowing partner finished 4 days after Ditton. Rackley wrote about that year's race in, Salt Sweat Tears: The Men Who Rowed The Oceans. (Penguin, 2014)

=== Ocean rowing solo world record attempt ===
In October 2016, Ditton began training in San Francisco, California, for world record attempt to row across the North Pacific solo. The record route will see Ditton attempt to row circa 5,500 nautical miles solo and unsupported from Choshi, Japan to San Francisco, California.

To date only 2 men have succeeded in rowing the North Pacific Ocean alone and without assistance. In 1991 Gerard d'Aboville departed Choshi, Japan and arrived in Ilwaco, Washington 134 days later. In 2005 Emmanuel Coindre departed Choshi, Japan and arrived in Coos Bay, Oregon 129 days later. Both men were towed the final distance to land, 20 miles and 50 miles respectively. Arguably, there is no record set for rowing land-to-land across the North Pacific.

In December 2017, Ditton made the Forbes 2018 Women in Sports to Watch list, alongside speed skater Maame Biney, professional skateboarder Nora Vasconcellas and slopestyle snowboarder Spencer O'Brien.

=== Farallon Island solo rowing record attempt ===
In January 2018, Ditton set herself a smaller challenge as part of her training: to circumnavigate the Farallon Islands. The intention was to row a 70 nautical mile loop non-stop - out to the islands and back, which would be entered for consideration as a new Guinness World Record. According to the organisation Blue Point Conservation Science, on record no one had rowed to or from the Farallon Islands since Christmas 1898 in the era of the lighthouse keeper. Ditton's first attempt on 24 April 2018 ended after 10 hours. Her second attempt on 6 June 2018 also ended in failure. On 18 October 2018, Ditton finally completed the row in 3 days 35 minutes. The record was rejected by Guinness World Records on the grounds that "a first is not necessarily in itself a record. Records have to be breakable, measurable and comparable." The short film about Ditton's row around the Farallons is called 'DETERMINATION: Farallon Record.'

=== San Francisco to Santa Barbara solo rowing trip ===
In June 2018, Ditton rowed under the Golden Gate Bridge of San Francisco, with 10 days of food packed on board her boat. After rounding Point Conception, Ditton was blasted by freak Santa Ana winds of 100 degrees fahrenheit. Ditton started drifting toward an oil rig. She dropped a sea anchor to slow down the vessel as it drifted, but, then found herself in a current heading westbound out to sea. Ditton arrived into Santa Barbara after 12.5 days at sea with nothing left to eat. Ditton said it was a good experience for what she will likely encounter on the North Pacific and is quoted as having said, "You don't learn anything if everything goes well." Ditton categorized the 5 scariest challenges of rowing from San Francisco to Los Angeles as: 1. Jellyfish, 2. Weather, 3. Other Ships, 4. Sleep deprivation and 5. Rowing Nude.

=== Portland to San Francisco solo rowing trip ===
In September 2019, Ditton began a 30-day solo rowing trip 100 miles down the Columbia River at Portland, Oregon and headed out to sea, following a path charted along the edge of the Continental Shelf. She arrived in Sausalito on 25 September after rowing under the Golden Gate Bridge, completing her 828-mile journey. According to Ditton, the open water trip was a training run for her planned 2020 trans-Pacific journey.

Ditton characterized her Portland-to-San Francisco expedition as "a beautiful ordeal," noting that at one point in the journey she faced a storm with 40-knot winds and 60-foot breaking waves, with one wave tipping her boat on its side and forcing her to hang on for dear life by jamming her feet into the footboards and tightly gripping the rails of her cockpit. At another point she was trapped in a powerful circular eddy, from which she extricated herself by counterintuitively rowing for two days back to the North from whence she came and escaping slightly to the West of the current.

=== San Francisco to Hawaii solo world record ===
In September 2020, Ditton set a new women's world record for rowing solo from San Francisco to Hawaii. She made landfall at 06.10 am 12 September, reaching Waikiki Yacht Club on the island of Oahu in 86 days, 10 hours, 5 minutes and 56 seconds to break Roz Savage's 2008 record of 100 days. The row was fraught with a series of mental and physical challenges, including illness before the start, two capsizes, a shortage of food, and persistent adverse currents and winds, as well as the tragic news that fellow rower Angela Madsen had died during her attempt. Ditton described the voyage as "the greatest psychological challenge of my life".

== Other interests ==
=== Art installations ===
Ditton's experience of racing across the Atlantic alone in 2005, formed the basis of her 2006 art installation 'Absolute Solitude: One Woman, One Boat' in which she lived on her boat in the courtyard of Chelsea College of Arts, next to the Tate Britain Gallery for 28 days – the same number of days as it took her to sail to the US.

Photographer Alain Zimeray was a visitor to the exhibition. Inspired by his encounter with Ditton, he composed the book Dames de la Mer with author Christian Bontzolakis. (Published by Marines Nantes, 2009)

Filmmaker, Richard Gooderick interviewed Ditton after the exhibition. The interview became part of Gooderick's Bluewater series, aired by sailing magazine Yachting World.

Ditton joined Craig Revel-Horwood on BBC Radio 4 Midweek with Libby Purves, to discuss the exhibition.

=== Modelling ===
Ditton has modeled three times in New York City at charity fashion show event Dressed to Kilt hosted by Sean Connery. In 2006, Ditton modelled for Nicole Romano, who attended the show; in 2007 for Nicole Hanley and in 2010 Ditton and Joan Jett walked down the catwalk wearing designs by Joey D.

Both 2007 and 2010 events were attended by Donald Trump.

=== Published Works ===
Ditton was commissioned in 2012, by Adlard Coles Nautical for Bloomsbury Publishing, to write the book:

- 50 Water Adventures To Do Before You Die, The World's Ultimate Experiences In, On And Under Water.

The German edition:

- 50 Ultimative Wasserabenteuer, Die Man Erlebt Haben Muss, was published in 2016 by Delius Klasing.

=== Film ===
In 2018, Ditton was featured in an episode of Engage Your Senses, a series of films about women's stories of adventure created by filmmaker Danielle Sellwood for outdoor clothing brand, Ellis Brigham.

Ditton and Sellwood partnered to produce a number of films documenting Ditton's training rows.

Their short film, PERSEVERANCE: California Coast Row, was screened at the Four Seasons Film Festival in London in March 2019.

Their second collaboration, DETERMINATION: Farallon Record, was shown at the 18th International Ocean Film Festival in San Francisco in April 2021 and Korea International Ocean Film Festival (KIOFF) in July 2021 in Busan, South Korea and as part of the KIOFF travel program.

Their third short film, TENACITY: Oregon Coast Row, was only released on the popular sailing website, Sailing Anarchy and in February 2020.

Their longest short film, 87 DAYS, ALONE ROWING THE PACIFIC premiered at Kendal Mountain Film Festival in November 2021 and was showcased in the UK at Adventure Uncovered Film Festival in February 2022, Sheffield Adventure Film Festival in March 2022 and London Mountain Film Festival in March 2022, as well as Annapolis Film Festival in April 2022 and Wasatch Film Festival in April 2022. The film was later released on Vimeo.
