= John Fairfax (rower) =

British ocean rower and adventurer

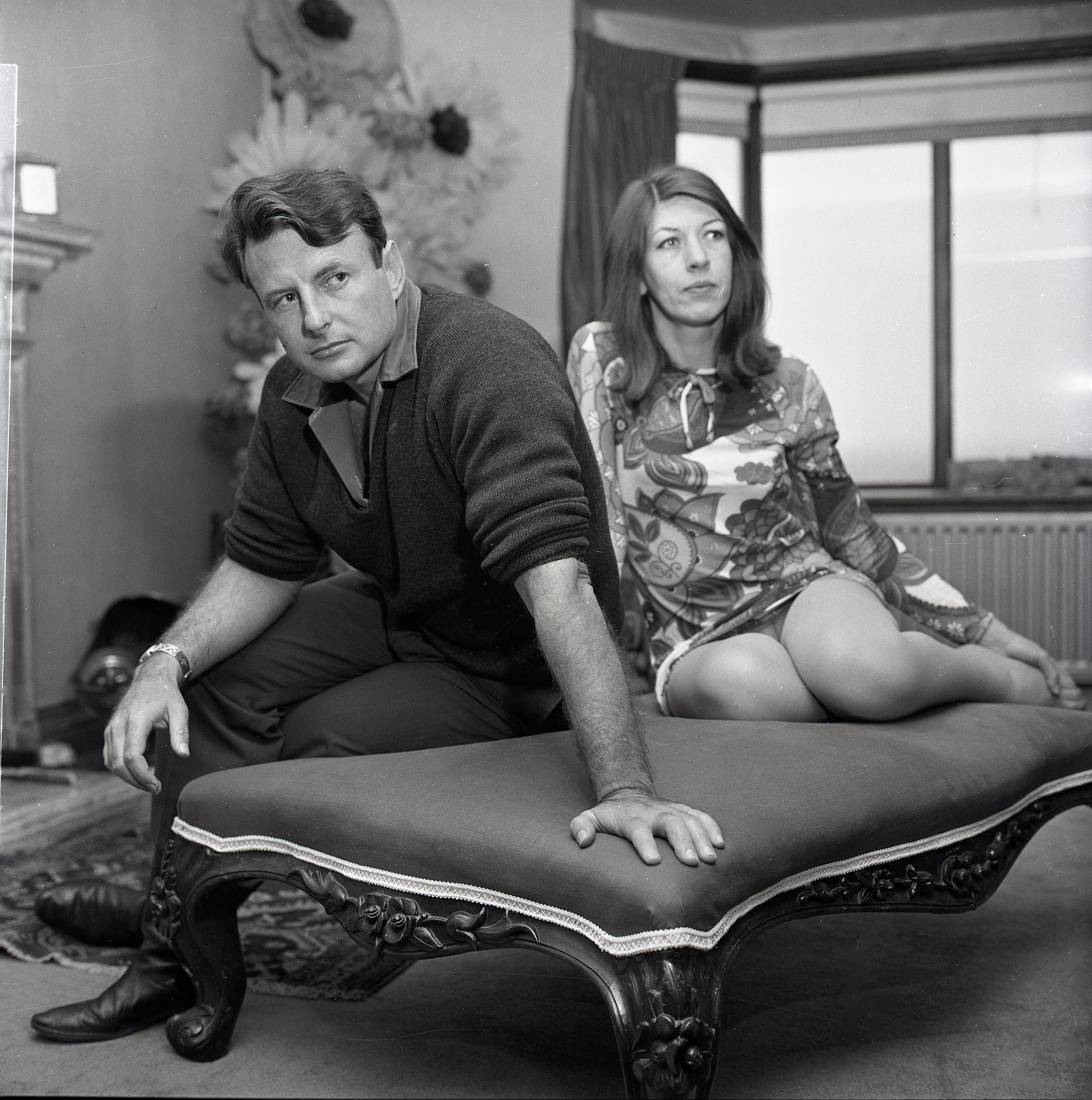
- John Fairfax and Sylvia Cook in 1968
- Born: 21 May 1937; Rome, Kingdom of Italy
- Died: 8 February 2012 (aged 74); Henderson, Nevada, United States
- Occupation: Rower
- Known for: First solo row across the Atlantic Ocean

John Fairfax (21 May 1937 – 8 February 2012) was a British ocean rower and adventurer who, in 1969, rowed across the Atlantic and became the first person to row solo across an ocean. He subsequently went on to become the first to row the Pacific Ocean (with Sylvia Cook) in 1971 and 1972.

== Early life ==
Fairfax was born on 21 May 1937 in Rome, Italy to an English father and Bulgarian mother. As a child he was expelled from the Italian Boy Scouts for opening fire, with a revolver, on a hut containing other Scouts. Soon after, he and his mother moved to Argentina where, aged thirteen, he left home to live in the jungle "like Tarzan", surviving by hunting and bartering skins with local peasants. Also as a teenager, he read of Frank Samuelsen and George Harbo's famous row across the Atlantic Ocean (then the only ocean to have been rowed) and knew that someday he would row across the Atlantic. At the age of 20 Fairfax considered suicide by confronting a jaguar. Changing his mind, he shot the animal and sold its skin. Subsequent activities included stints as an apprentice pirate and the running of a mink farm.

== Travels in the Americas ==
In 1959, Fairfax flew to New York City and drove across America to San Francisco. When he ran out of money, Fairfax decided to return to his mother in Argentina by bike. He got as far as Guatemala and then hitchhiked on to Panama.

After a brief spell as a sailor on a Colombian boat he returned to Panama where he fell in with pirates and ended up spending three years smuggling guns, whiskey and cigarettes. After a dramatic escape from the pirates and the authorities, he returned to Argentina on horseback.

Back in Argentina he first read of Chay Blyth and John Ridgway's successful row across the Atlantic and realised that if he wanted to be the first person to row solo across the Atlantic he would have to do it soon.

== Atlantic crossing ==
After returning to England, it took Fairfax two years to prepare for the row. On 19 July 1969 he became the first person to row solo across an ocean when he arrived in Florida having set off from the Canary Islands. The self-righting and self-bailing boat Britannia, now located in the National Maritime Museum Cornwall, was designed by Uffa Fox. The row took 180 days. Upon completion of his row he received a message of congratulations from the crew of Apollo 11 who had walked on the Moon the day after he had completed his voyage. In their letter the crew stated:

"Yours, however, was the accomplishment of one resourceful individual, while ours depended upon the help of thousands of dedicated workers in the United States and all over the world. As fellow explorers, we salute you on this great occasion."

== Pacific crossing ==
External audio
- John Fairfax and Sylvia Cook, 43:05, WNYC
- Sylvia Cook, 12:42, Avaunt podcast

Two years later in 1971 he set off with Sylvia Cook from San Francisco in an attempt to row across the Pacific Ocean in their boat Britannia II. Cook had replied to a personal ad that Fairfax had put in The Times when looking for support for his first row. The pair arrived at Hayman Island in Australia 361 days later, in the process becoming the first people to row across the Pacific, and Cook becoming the first woman to row across an ocean.

== Later life ==
He was a subject of the television programme This Is Your Life in January 1970 when he was surprised by Eamonn Andrews.

He and his wife moved to Las Vegas in 1992 after a hurricane hit Florida. Fairfax was an expert at baccarat and frequented the casinos in Las Vegas.

Fairfax died on 8 February 2012, at the age of 74 in Henderson, Nevada.
