= Mick Dawson (Royal Marine) =

British Royal Marine Commando, filmmaker and sailor

Mick Dawson (born in June 1964 in Boston, Lincolnshire, England) is a former Royal Marine Commando, film maker, professional sailor and adventurer. He is best known for rowing the Pacific Ocean with friend and fellow ocean rower Chris Martin in a new state of the art vessel, Bojangles, which Mick built. In 2009, they completed their 7,000 mi (11,000 km) voyage in 189 days 10 hours and 55 minutes; a world first and earning a place in the Guinness Book of records.

== Rowing ==
Mick Dawson is one of the most experienced ocean rowers in the world having rowed over 20,000 miles 20,000 mi (32,000 km) across the worlds oceans during some 524 days at sea in ocean rowing boats.

=== Pairs Atlantic Crossing in 2001 with his brother Steve. ===
Completed in 70 days 10 hours and 12 minutes.

=== Solo North Pacific attempt in 2003 ===
Mick made his first attempt to row the Pacific Ocean solo in 2003, ended when his rudder was torn off, in severe weather, and he had to return to Japan after 12 days.

=== Solo North Pacific attempt in 2004 ===
The second in 2004, was halted by a freak capsize that sank his boat after 109 days at sea and having rowed over 4,500 mi (7,200 km), two thirds of the way across the route.

=== Pairs Atlantic Crossing in 2005 with Andrew Morris. ===
Mick worked for the Atlantic Rowing Race organisers as a rowing consultant and safety skipper for the 2005. It was here he came to the rescue of an injured Andrew Morris and went on to complete a second crossing of the Atlantic at his side. Completed in 61 days 2 hours and 50 minutes.

=== Pairs North Pacific Crossing in 2009 with Chris Martin ===
Mick, together with his friend and fellow ocean rower Chris Martin skippered the first team to successfully row, 7,000 mi (11,000 km) across the hostile north Pacific route; from Choshi in Japan to directly beneath the iconic span of the Golden Gate Bridge in San Francisco. They rowed in a boat called Bojangles, which Mick built – The boat was 23 ft (7.0 m) long and 6 ft (1.8 m) wide and was manufactured from lightweight Carbon-Kevlar material. The boat was one of the most advanced ocean rowing vessels ever made. Unfortunately, after months at sea and several days of adverse weather and increasing fatigue, the decision was made to resupply before their contingency ran out completely, as they hoped they would have enough supplies to make it to San Francisco unsupported. Mick and Chris completed their journey from Choshi in Japan to San Francisco on the 13 November 2009 at 16:00 GMT. They were greeted by their families and a flotilla of boats as they passed the finish line under the Golden Gate Bridge in San Francisco. They completed the 7,000 mi (11,000 km) voyage in 189 days 10 hours and 55 minutes.

Mick and Chris also raised money for two charities, one based in the United Kingdom and one based in Nigeria. The first is the Hearts of Gold Children's Hospice. The second charity is Hamilton Lodge School for Deaf Children.

=== Pairs Crossing of the Pacific; California to Hawaii 2018 ===
Mick returned to the Pacific in 2018 to take part in the Great Pacific Race from Monterey Bay to Hawaii in 2018. He rowed with Steve 'Sparky' Sparkes. The pair completed the race in 82 days, 16 hours and 54 minutes coming first in the pairs category and third overall in a highly eventful race. When the pair stepped ashore at Waikiki Yacht club 'Sparky' (Also a former Royal Marine Commando) became the first 'Blind' person to row the Pacific Ocean.

Discovery Channel charted Mick's and Chris' voyage in the documentary 'Rowing The Pacific.'

== Business career ==
Mick is a published author having written two books about his adventures in ocean rowing and working with recovering veterans. His first book; published in the US in 2017 is called Battling the Oceans in a Rowboat and in the U.K. it's published under the title; Rowing the Pacific

His second book entitled; 'Never Leave A Man Behind,' which covers his work with recovering veterans and his row with blind veteran 'Sparky' across the Pacific in 2018 was published in July 2020.

Mick is also an accomplished speaker and works regularly; online and at live events, with companies and corporations across the globe. Giving insights into the ethos of great teamwork, achieving goals and adaptive leadership using his many ocean rowing adventures as a dramatic backdrop to illustrate his points.
