= Bhavik Gandhi =

Bhavik Gandhi is a sailor, adventurer and entrepreneur. In 2007 he became the first Asian to row across the Atlantic Ocean.

== Adventures ==
Bhavik performed a number of adventures in sailing, traveling long distance on bicycle and by foot. Here are some notable adventures:

=== Rowing over Atlantic ===
In 2007, Bhavik rowed across the Atlantic Ocean solo, non-stop and unsupported from Spain to Antigua, to become the first Asian ever to do so. It took him 106 days; which is a record for solo rowing across the Atlantic. He arrived at the shores of Antigua on 14 June 2007.

=== Stockholm to Istanbul by bicycle ===
In July 2004, he toured from Stockholm to Istanbul on bike, through Latvia, Lithuania, Poland, Turkey, Croatia, Italy, and Greece; a total of 3000 km. During his adventure he also tested the performance of mobile applications along the way.

== Entrepreneurship ==
Gandhi is an entrepreneur with a portfolio of investments in telecoms, technology, media, and entertainment. He is also motivational speaker; he delivered the keynote speech at Stockholm School of Entrepreneurship Startup Day 2007.

== See also ==
- History of Atlantic crossings by rowing
