= Sylvia Cook =

British ocean rower and adventurer

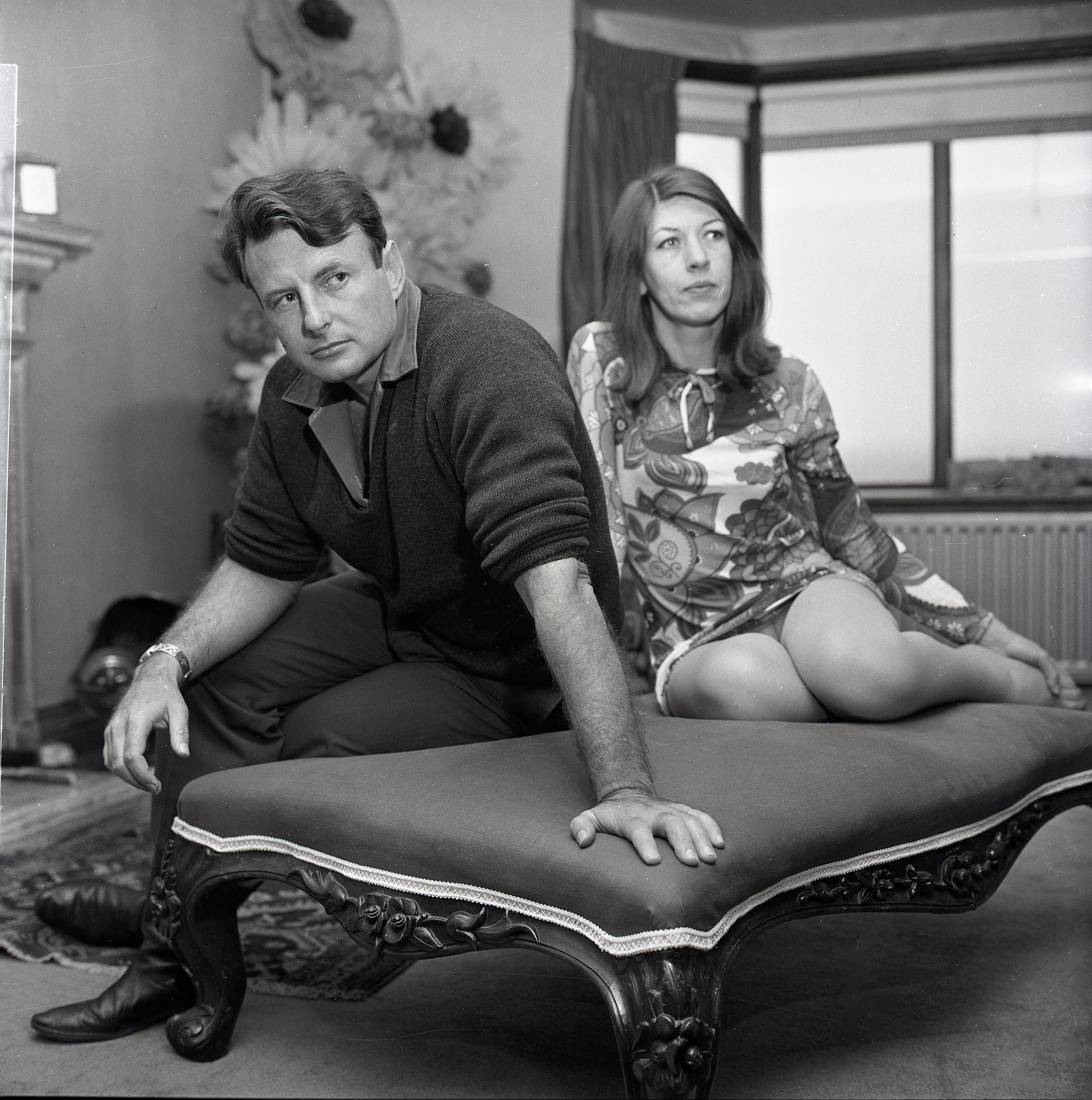
John Fairfax and Sylvia Cook in 1968

Sylvia Cook is a British ocean rower and adventurer who, on 22 April 1972, became the first person to row the Pacific Ocean, in tandem with John Fairfax. With this accomplishment she became the first woman to row any ocean. The journey took 363 days at sea from San Francisco to Australia.

== Early life ==
Cook was born to a middle-class family, the daughter of a teacher and a secretary.

== Pacific crossing ==
External audio
- Sylvia Cook, 12:42, Avaunt podcast
- John Fairfax and Sylvia Cook, 43:05, WNYC

Cook and John Fairfax started rowing for their cross-Pacific journey in San Francisco on 26 April 1971 in a specially designed tandem row boat called Britannia II, a self-bailing, self uprighting vessel, designed by Uffa Fox.

== Later life ==
Cook works for B&Q in Surrey, UK, where most of her co-workers had no idea she had rowed across the Pacific Ocean.
