= Ocean rowing =

Sport of rowing across oceans

Ocean rowing is the sport of rowing across oceans. Some ocean rowing boats can hold as many as fourteen rowers; however, the most common ocean rowboats are designed for singles, doubles, and fours.

The history of ocean rowing is divided into two eras by the Ocean Rowing Society International, the official adjudicator of ocean rowing records for Guinness World Records. The first fourteen ocean rows, up to and including 1981, are considered historic ocean rows as they were completed with very limited, if any, modern technology. All subsequent rows are described as modern-day rows.

== History ==
The first ocean to be deliberately rowed across was the Atlantic by Frank Samuelsen and George Harbo, two Norwegian-born Americans, in June 1896. The pair left Battery Park, Manhattan, on 6 June 1896, arriving on the Isles of Scilly, 55 days and 13 hours later, having covered 3,250 nautical miles (3,740 mi; 6,020 km). They continued to row to Le Havre, France. No such crossing would be officially attempted again for 70 years' time, and, in a testament to the sport's inherent danger, the first to try to repeat the feat, again a two-man crew rowing the Atlantic from west to east, were lost at sea in 1966. However, that same year, John Ridgway and Chay Blyth successfully rowed across the Atlantic in 92 days.

The first solo crossing of an ocean was completed by John Fairfax of Britain on 19 July 1969. He rowed from Gran Canaria in the Canary Islands to Hollywood Beach, Florida in 180 days. In the same year Tom McClean, also of Britain, rowed from Newfoundland, Canada arriving in Blacksod Bay, Ireland on 27 July 1969. Despite having left almost four months after Fairfax, he came within 8 days of beating Fairfax to the title of first solo rower of any ocean.

In 1974, Derek Paul King and Peter Bird rowed across the Atlantic Ocean from Gibraltar to St. Lucia in Britannia II - the boat designed by Uffa Fox and first rowed by John Fairfax and Sylvia Cook across the Pacific Ocean in 1971/72.

Kathleen and Curtis Saville were the first people born in America to row across the Atlantic Ocean from Casablanca to Antigua in 1981 and Kathleen was the first woman to row the North Atlantic Ocean.

In 2023, Finnish firefighter Jari Saario became the second human ever to row across Atlantic Ocean twice. He started his first row from Gran Canaria, Canary Islands to Antigua at 23 January 2023 and arrived at Antigua on 28 March 2023. He started his second row from St. Johns, Canada at 22 June 2023 and ended his rowing tour at Cuxhaven, Germany 10 October 2023.

Kenneth Crutchlow, the founder of ORSI, was the major contributor to popularizing ocean rowing.

== Atlantic crossings ==
Amyr Klink was the first person to row across the South Atlantic, leaving from Lüderitz, Namibia on 9 June 1984 and arriving 101 days later in Salvador, Brazil on 18 September 1984.

In September 1987, Don Allum became the first to row the Atlantic in both directions, having successfully completed a 77-day solo journey from Newfoundland, Canada to Achill Island, Ireland and having previously rowed from Gran Canaria to Barbados in 1971 with his cousin Geoff Allum, in 73 days.

One man holds the world record for both the fastest solo boat to cross the Atlantic and the fastest duo - Dutch Mark Slats crossed the Atlantic Ocean solo in only 30 days, seven hours and 49 minutes in 2017 in a Rannoch R15 ocean rowing boat called Peanuts. Mark rowed the Atlantic again in 2020 with a fellow Dutchman Kai Weedmer. The duo were first to arrive in Antigua beating all 3, 4 and 5 man crews participating in the Atlantic Challenge and broke the record for the fastest pair to row across the Atlantic Ocean taking just 32 days, 22 hours, 13 minutes. Their boat 'Maria' a D12 from The Ocean Rowing Company was built by Mark Slats himself.

The world record for the fastest four-man crossing of the Atlantic Ocean in a rowing boat is held by team The Four Oarsmen. During the Talisker Whisky Atlantic challenge they rowed 4,722 km (2,554 nautical miles) from La Gomera in the Canary Islands to Antigua aboard a Rannoch R45 boat named Aegir, arriving on 12 January 2018. They rowed the Atlantic Ocean Trade Winds I route (open-class category) in 29 days and 15 hours. The four man team consisted of close friends (Stuart Watts, Peter Robinson, Richard Taylor and George Biggar – all from the United Kingdom). Aegir is the fastest rowing boat to cross any ocean, at an average speed of 3.589 knots, beating the previous record held by Sara G since 2011.

The fastest rowing record to cross the Atlantic Ocean by a female crew was created by Chinese women Cloris Chen Yuli, Amber Li Xiaobing, Tina Liang Mintian and Sarah Meng Yajie at the Talisker Whisky Atlantic Challenge 2017, rowing a Rannoch R45 Jasmine 2. Arriving on 18 January 2018, they rowed from La Gomera to Antigua in 34 days, 13 hours, 13 minutes, shattering the previous record of 40 days, 8 hours, 26 minutes set two years ago by a British team. Their team Kung Fu Cha Cha was the first team from Asia to row across the Atlantic Ocean. With an average age of 23.5, the four students from Shantou University became the youngest team ever to row across the Atlantic. Before attending university, they had no experience in ocean rowing.

The fastest Atlantic crossing by a female crew of three was 42 days, 7 hours, 17 minutes between 12 December 2021 and 23 January 2022 over the Canaries to Antigua course, achieved by English crew Kat Cordiner, Charlotte Irving and Abby Johnston rowing Rannoch R45 Dolly Parton.

An eleven-man French crew aboard La Mondiale set the record for the fastest row from Santa Cruz de La Palma to Martinique, in 1992 at 35 days, 8 hours, and 30 minutes.

On 3 December 1999, Tori Murden of the United States became the first woman to row any ocean solo when she arrived in Guadeloupe, having set off from Tenerife in the Canary Islands 81 days earlier. In March 2006, Julie Wafaei of Canada became the first woman to row across the Atlantic from mainland to mainland.

On 10 July 2005, the Vivaldi Atlantic four-man team (Nigel Morris, George Rock, Steve Dawson, Rob Munslow) set the record for fastest unsupported row from St John's, Newfoundland to the longitude of Bishop Rock lighthouse, United Kingdom. They left on 31 May 2005, arriving back on 10 July 2005 in a time of 39 days 22 hours and 10 minutes setting a Guinness World Record. The Vivaldi Atlantic four also became the first four-man team ever to row the North Atlantic west to east.

The fastest unsupported row from the United States to England was set in 2005 by The Ocean Fours (NL) (Gijs Groeneveld, Robert Hoeve, Jaap Koomen, Maarten Staarink) with the Vopak Victory. They left New York on 27 May and crossed the Bishops Rock longitude 60 days, 16 hours, and 19 minutes later. This record was beaten by Leven Brown and his crew in 2010. Their boat Artemis Investments left New York on 17 June 2010 and arrived in St Mary's on 31 July 2010 in a time of 43 days 21 hours 26 mins and 48 seconds. This has remained the record to date for the longer 2,850 nmi (5,280 km; 3,280 mi) and original North Atlantic route. During their voyage they were capsized twice in storms.

Frenchman Charles Hedrich set the record for the fastest solo Atlantic crossing in 2007, from Dakar to Brazil in 36 days and 6 hours. Charles Hedrich is also the first man to complete a double Atlantic crossing nonstop, rowing solo and unassisted. Leaving from Saint-Pierre-et-Miquelon, his path took him eastward across the North Atlantic to the Canary Islands, and then westward back to Martinique. The expedition lasted 145 days and 22 hours, ending on 1 December 2012.

On 14 June 2007, Bhavik Gandhi became the first Asian to row the Atlantic solo, nonstop and unsupported from Spain to Antigua. The trip, lasting 106 days, also set the record for the longest solo row across the Atlantic Ocean.

A fourteen-man British and Irish crew skippered by Leven Brown aboard La Mondiale set a new world record crossing the mid-Atlantic from east-to-west, Gran Canaria to Barbados, of 33 days, 7 hours, and 30 minutes from 15 December 2007, to 17 January 2008.

In 2010, Katie Spotz of the United States rowed solo mainland-to-mainland Dakar, Senegal–Georgetown, Guyana, 2,817 nmi (5,217 km; 3,242 mi) in 70 days. At 22 years and 260 days old, she held the record as the youngest person to row solo across an ocean until 2018 when American Oliver Crane crossed the Atlantic solo at 19 years and 148 days old.

The record for the fastest crossing from Africa to the West Indies was set in 2011 by a six-man crew aboard Sara G (Matt Craughwell, Fiann Paul, Tomas Cremona, Adam Burke, Rob Byrne and Graham Carlin), with a crossing time of 33 days 21 hours and 46 minutes from Morocco to the West Indies. Sara G travelled at an average speed of 3.386 knots and the highest total number of days rowed above 100 miles per day (16 days). The Atlantic speed record was the first of four speed records earning Fiann Paul the Guinness World Record of "The first person to hold current speed records on four oceans" in 2017.

From 10 October 2011 to 11 March 2012, Erden Eruç set the record for the longest distance rowed across the Atlantic, solo and nonstop, crossing from Lüderitz, Namibia to Güiria, Venezuela along a route of 5,029 nmi (9,314 km; 5,787 mi) in 153 1/2 days.

Gerard Marie of France set the record as the oldest solo ocean rower in 2015 at 66 years 323 days old, while Diana Hoff of the United Kingdom set the record as the oldest female solo ocean rower in 2000 at 55 years 135 days old. Dianne Carrington and Peter Smith, both of the United Kingdom, hold the records for the oldest female and male ocean rowers among rowing teams at 61 years 349 days (2018) and 74 years 217 days (2016), respectively.

In 2018, Bryce Carlson of the United States set the record for the fastest solo crossing of the North Atlantic Ocean in a Rannoch R10 boat from St John's, Newfoundland, Canada to St Mary's, Isles of Scilly, England, the first American to complete a North Atlantic crossing, aboard the custom built 20 ft (6.1 m) boat Lucille. The journey of 2,302 nmi (4,263 km; 2,649 mi) set a record crossing time of 38 days, 6 hours and 49 minutes from 27 June to 4 August 2018, at an average speed of 2.5 knots (4.6 km/h; 2.9 mph).

In 2020, Anna and Cameron Mclean became the world's first brother and sister team to row any ocean. They achieved this by rowing across the Atlantic Ocean in 43 days, 15 hours and 22 minutes.

In February 2021, 21-year-old Jasmine Harrison of Thirsk, North Yorkshire became the youngest woman ever to row across the Atlantic Ocean. Harrison rowed from La Gomera in the Canary Islands to Antigua in the West Indies in 70 days, three hours and 48 minutes.

The fastest team of eight to row across the Atlantic on the Trade Winds 1 route was achieved by Simon Chalk, Paul Williams, Matthew Inglesby, Matthew Mason, James Prior, Oliver Waite, Gavin Emmerson (all UK) and Yaacov Mutnikas (Lithuania) who rowed a distance of (4808 km) 2569 nautical miles from Puerto Mogan, Gran Canaria to Port St. Charles, Barbados at an average speed of 3.29 knots between 10 February and 15 March 2014.

The oldest male pair to row any ocean is David Murray and Guy Rigby from The UK. They left La Gomera and on 12 December 2021 and arrived in Antigua 53 days 3 hours and 42 minutes. With a combined age of 124 Years and 301 days.

Ananya Prasad, a 34-year-old from the UK and of Indian origin, achieved a historic milestone by becoming the first woman of colour to row solo across any ocean. Her 3,000-mile, 52-day journey began on December 11, 2024, when she set off from La Gomera in the Canary Islands. She arrived in Antigua in the Caribbean on February 1, 2025, having rowed an estimated 60–70 Kilometres each day across the Atlantic. Her row was completed in 52 days, 5 hours and 44 minutes. Despite having no prior nautical experience, Ananya demonstrated extraordinary determination. She dedicated three and a half years to rigorous training, building her physical endurance, technical rowing skills, and mental resilience. This preparation proved crucial when, during the race, her rudder broke. Undeterred, she braved 15-foot waves and her fear of deep water to dive under her boat and make the necessary repairs. Ananya's remarkable feat culminated in completing the World's Toughest Row, where she finished second in the solo category. Driven by a desire to make a difference, Ananya undertook this challenge to raise funds for two important causes: the Mental Health Foundation UK and the Deenabandhu Trust, which provides a home and education for orphaned and impoverished children in South India.

=== Atlantic rowing races ===
Rowing the Atlantic first became mainstream when the first Atlantic Rowing Race was launched by Sir Chay Blyth, after reflecting on his own ocean row that propelled him to international renown. This was the Port St. Charles, Barbados Atlantic Rowing Race. Thirty double-handed teams lined up at the start line in a "one design" rowing boat just outside Los Gigantes marina on Sunday 12 October 1997. The race was won by Kiwi Challenge, rowed by Rob Hamill and Phil Stubbs after 41 days at sea. Second place went to the French crew of Atlantik Challenge, Joseph Le Guen and his partner, a double convicted murderer, Pascal Blond.

Later Atlantic rowing races:

- Ward Evans Atlantic Rowing Race 2001 - Won by Matt Goodman & Steve Westlake in Telecom Challenge 1 .
- Woodvale Atlantic Rowing Race 2003 - Won by James Fitzgerald & Kevin Biggar in Holiday Shoppe Challenge .
- Ocean Rowing Society's Atlantic Rowing Race 2004 - Fours event won by Queensgate (GB) – Jason Hart, Iain "Yorkie" Lomas, Phil Langman and Shaun Barker; Pairs event won by Christopher Morgan and Michael Perrins in Carpe Diem (GB).
- Woodvale Atlantic Rowing Race 2005 - Won by Clint Evans and Chris Andrews in C² (GB).
- Shephard Ocean Fours Rowing Race 2006 - Inaugural North Atlantic Rowing Race won by team OAR Northwest (Jordan Hanssen, Brad Vickers, Greg Spooner, and Dylan LeValley) rowing James Robert Hanssen. OAR Northwest set a Guinness World Record for the first unassisted row from mainland United States to mainland United Kingdom.
- The Talisker Whisky Atlantic Challenge - Current and now annual event in ocean rowing on the Atlantic Ocean, from San Sebastian in La Gomera, Canary Islands (28° N 18° W) to Nelson's Dockyard, English Harbour, Antigua & Barbuda (17° N 61° W). The race begins in early December, with up to 30 teams participating from around the world.

== Pacific Ocean rowing ==
Following his successful Atlantic Ocean crossing, John Fairfax set off from San Francisco in California on 26 April 1971 with Sylvia Cook. After three stops (in Mexico, Fanning Island and the Gilbert Island of Onotoa), the two arrived on Hayman Island in Australia 361 days later on 22 April 1972. Cook became the first woman to row any ocean.

Kathleen and Curtis Saville were the first to row from South America (Callao, Peru) to Cairns, Australia from 1984 - 1985. Their journey was recorded on the Ocean Rowing Society's site. Kathleen is also the first woman to row across two oceans - the Atlantic Ocean in 1981 and South Pacific Ocean from 1984 to 1985. In 1976, Patrick Quesnel completed a crossing from Washington state to Hawaii, a journey of 2,200 nautical miles (4,100 km) which took him 114 days. In 1977, Colin Quincey became the first to cross the Tasman Sea, the segment of the Pacific Ocean between Australia and New Zealand. He departed Hokianga, New Zealand, on 6 February 1977 and 63 days later arrived at Marcus Beach, Australia on 10 April.

The first person to row the width of the Pacific Ocean solo was Peter Bird of Britain. Bird set off from San Francisco, California and arrived at the Great Barrier Reef, Australia 294 days later on 14 June 1983. Bird would later die attempting the west to east journey across the Pacific. Briton Jim Shekhdar later made the claim to be "the first person to row across the Pacific single-handed". Shekhdar had rowed across the Pacific non-stop, solo and unassisted arriving in Australia on 30 March 2001. Some within the sport felt that Shekhdar had not given due credit to the achievement of Peter Bird and the term "unassisted" also came under some scrutiny.

Roz Savage rowed from San Francisco to Hawaii in 2008, the first woman to do so solo, and from Hawaii to Tuvalu in 2009. She completed the third leg her trip (from Tuvalu to PNG) in 2010 and so became the first woman to row across the Pacific Ocean unassisted. Chris Martin and Mick Dawson rowed a two-man boat from Choshi, Japan to San Francisco Harbour, USA in 2009. Their journey took 189 days and in doing so they achieved the Guinness World Record for being the first team to row across the North Pacific Ocean.

From 10 July 2007 to 17 May 2008, Erden Eruç rowed westward from Bodega Bay, California for a total of 312 consecutive days, setting the current world record for a non-stop unassisted ocean row. Eruç completed a solo human-powered circumnavigation from 2007 to 2012, crossing the Pacific, Indian and Atlantic Oceans becoming the first person to row all three.

From 22 December 2013 to 31 May 2014, Fyodor Konyukhov crossed the Pacific Ocean starting in the Chilean port of Concón and finishing in Mooloolaba, Queensland, Australia without entering ports and without any external help or assistance. He covered the distance of more than 17408 km (9400 nautical miles) on the Turgoyak rowboat in just 162 days. On 26 December 2015, British-born Canadian, John Beeden, 53, became the first person to successfully row non-stop, unassisted from North America to Australia covering 7400 nautical miles in 209 days. Beeden had previously completed a non-stop, solo Atlantic crossing in 2011.

On 18 June 2019, Jacob Adoram Hendrickson set the Guinness World Record for completing the longest solo, nonstop, unassisted ocean row across the Pacific from North America. Hendrickson launched with zero ocean boating experience, determined to travel a greater distance than previous rowers, without any stops or resupplies along the way.

Hendrickson departed Neah Bay, Washington on 7 July 2018. Each day, he rowed an average 10–12 hours for 336 days at sea, reaching a distance of 7,145 miles when he landed in Cairns, Australia. Hendrickson also holds the Guinness world record for the longest time rowed nonstop across any ocean.

A crossing was completed in 2025 from Lima, Peru to Australia by a British crew of Jess Rowe and Miriam Payne, believed to be the first unsupported, non-stop crossing by a female crew and by the youngest all-female pair. The pair also raised more than £86,000 for The Outward Bound Trust.

In May 2026, Kelsey Pfendler began a solo crossing from Monterey to Honolulu, finishing in July and setting a new record for that crossing, completing it in less than 44 days, beating the 52 day record set by Rob Eustace. She was the third woman overall to complete the crossing, after Lia Ditton and Savage.

=== Torres Strait ===
In the late 1950s, Georgian-born Australian Michael 'Tarzan' Fomenko (c.1930–2018) solo paddled a homemade dugout canoe from Cooktown in Queensland, Australia to Merauke (then part of Dutch New Guinea); a journey of 600km across the Torres Strait. He stopped at Horn Island en route. Fomenko completed the 600km journey in the 20ft long canoe, which was fitted with an out-rigger made of "rough hewn boughs", and had no sail.

=== Great Pacific Race ===
In June 2014, the first rowing race to take place on the Pacific Ocean started from Monterey, California, and ended in Honolulu, Hawaii. The Great Pacific Race was organized by New Ocean Wave which is run by Chris Martin and Roz Savage, both experienced ocean rowers.

Thirteen crews started the first Great Pacific Race in June 2014—four solo crews, three pairs, and six four-person teams representing ten nationalities. Due to logistical difficulties, some crews did not pass mandatory boat checks before the start of the race, and the decision was taken to operate a split start. Crews who were ready started on 9 June, and the rest departed during the next available weather window on 18 June. Rough weather at the start prompted several of the entrants to retire in the first few days. The pairs team Clearly Contacts retired after 10 mi (16 km) due to sea sickness and rowed back to Monterey. The solo entrant, Daryl Farmer, also accepted a tow by one of the race support boats after severe sea sickness that lasted several days. Other crews retired early for various reasons. The crew of Pacific Rowers was rescued by a USCG helicopter when their boat started to take on water after a few days at sea. One of the support vessels for the race had arrived at the scene but was unable to recover the crew due to the severe weather. The USCG rescue swimmer said it was, "the most challenging rescue I've ever had."

Of the thirteen crews that started the race, seven successfully made it to Honolulu. The winner of the race and the first fours team to ever row the Pacific was Team Uniting Nations comprising rowers from the Netherlands, New Zealand, South Korea and Great Britain. They completed the course in 43 days, 5 hours, and 30 minutes. Second place in the race was Team Battleborn who finished just 14 hours behind.

The fours team NOMAN finished in third place just ahead of the first pairs team, Fat Chance Row. Sami Inkinen and Meredith Loring of Fat Chance Row were rowing to promote the dangers of sugar in the diet and completed the row having had a diet primarily based on fats and proteins. The married couple, rowing in an open class row boat had completed the race in the second fastest time. Since they were not ready for the first start of the race on 9 June, they started late and posted an official finish time of 53 days, 23 hours, and 43 minutes.

The remaining fours crews of Pacific Warriors and Boatylicious were approaching Hawaii as Hurricane Iselle became a threat. A race support yacht towed Pacific Warriors the final 78 nmi (144 km; 90 mi) to O'ahu before returning to sea the next day to accompany Boatylicious in their final few miles to ensure they reached a safe harbor before the hurricane arrived. Both crews arrived safely at the Waikiki Yacht Club before the hurricane struck the island later that day.

The final boat to finish the initial Great Pacific Race was CC4 Pacific. Being several hundred miles behind Boatylicious, the French cousins aboard the classic pairs boat missed Hurricane Iselle but were asked by the race organizers to deploy their parachute anchor to prevent them from rowing into the path of Hurricane Julio which was close behind. CC4 Pacific encountered severe weather with winds in excess of fifty kn (93 km/h; 58 mph) and seas over 20 ft (6.1 m). The boat never capsized and the pair completed the race in 75 days, 9 hours, and 25 minutes.

The only soloist remaining at sea after the first few weeks of the race, Elsa Hammond, and her boat Darien were recovered by one of the race's support yachts, far off course, 60 nmi (110 km; 69 mi) south of Isla Guadalupe, Mexico after 52 days at sea.

==== 2016 race ====
The fastest crossing westbound to Hawaii was set in 2016 by the winning team of Uniting Nations (Carlo Facchino, Fiann Paul, Cyril Derreumaux, and Thiago Silva) with a crossing time of 39 days, 9 hours, and 56 minutes, earning Fiann Paul the third of four overall speed records and the Guinness World Record for "The first person to hold current speed records on four oceans."

In 2016, Erden Eruç rowed with Louis Bird, the son of Peter Bird, as a substitute for a race partner who had withdrawn for health reasons. They set the fastest time in the classic pair class, 54 days, 3 hours, and 45 minutes, finishing first among three boats in the same class.

== Indian Ocean rowing ==
The Indian Ocean was first crossed by Anders Svedlund of Sweden in 1971. He set off from Kalbarri in Western Australia on 29 April 1971 and arrived near Diego Suarez, Madagascar, 64 days later on 23 June.

Sarah Outen, a 24-year-old Briton, left Fremantle, Western Australia on 1 April 2009. Rowing her 19 ft (5.8 m) boat Serendipity, she arrived at Bois des Amourettes, Mauritius, 124 days later on 3 August. She became the first woman soloist to attempt and successfully complete the crossing.

The previous speed record for rowing the Indian Ocean was held by the 8 person crew of Audeamus ('Let Us Dare'), who took a little over 58 days to set the new record in 2009. The crew consisted of Bernard Fisset (Belgium); Doug Tuminello, Brian Flick and Angela Madsen (USA); and Helen Taylor, Ian Couch, Simon Chalk and Paul Cannon (UK).

Audeamus is the first boat ever to row unassisted, land to land cross the Indian Ocean, landing just a few weeks ahead of "Team MSS". It is also the first, multi-person boat and the first mixed boat to row the Indian Ocean and the first 8-person boat to row any Ocean. All are Guinness World Records.

Helen Taylor and Angela Madsen are the first women to row across the Indian Ocean, landing just a few weeks ahead of Sarah Outen. There are several other Guinness world records associated with the boat.

The first all female crew to cross the Indian Ocean left Australia, Geroldton on 19 April 2009 taking 78 days to cross the ocean coming second in the first ever 'Woodvale Indian Ocean Rowing Race'. The Ocean Angels (www.oceanangels.co.uk) supported Breast Cancer Care on their journey, consisting of Fiona Waller, Sarah Duff, Elin Davies and Joanna Jackson.

On 19 April 2009 Andrew Delaney and Guy Watts began their unsupported ocean row from Geraldton, Western Australia across the Indian Ocean to Mauritius. They set five world records and broke two race speed records. They were the first pair to row unassisted land to land across the Indian Ocean and they were winners of the ‘pair’s class’ in the inaugural Indian Ocean Rowing Race.

From 13 July 2010 to 20 April 2011 Erden Eruç set four Guinness World Records for rowing on the Indian Ocean as part of his successful first solo human-powered circumnavigation, becoming the first person to row from mainland Australia to mainland Africa, completing the greatest distance rowed on the Indian Ocean—5,667 nautical miles (10,495 km; 6,521 mi) from mainland Australia to Madagascar and across the Mozambique Channel to mainland Africa—and the greatest distance rowed solo as well as the greatest distance rowed non-stop on the Indian Ocean—5,086 nautical miles (9,419 km; 5,853 mi) from Australia to Madagascar.

On 5 August 2013, Maxime Chaya (Lebanon) and his two teammates Stuart Kershaw (England) and Livar Nysted (Faroe Islands) arrived in Mauritius 57 days, 15 hours, and 49 minutes with the average speed of 2.27 knots after setting off from Geraldton, Western Australia aboard rowboat tRIO. They set a new world speed record, beating the previous one set by an 8-person crew in 2009. In addition, the trio Chaya, Kershaw and Nysted became the first 3-man team to cross the Indian or any ocean.

The fastest crossing of the Indian Ocean was set in 2014 by a six-man crew aboard Avalon: (Leven Brown, Jamie Douglas-Hamilton, Tim Spiteri, Fiann Paul, Cameron Bellamy and Heather Rees-Gaunt) with a crossing time of 57 days from 10 hours and 58 mins from Geraldton, Australia to Victoria, Mahe, Seychelles with an average speed of 2.65 knots covering distance 600 nautical miles longer than the previous world record holders which calculates into approximately 10 days advantage over the previous record holders. The crew also set the record for the longest distance rowed by a crew. It was the second of 4 overall speed records allowing Fiann Paul to earn Guinness title of "The first person to hold current speed records on 4 oceans" in 2017.

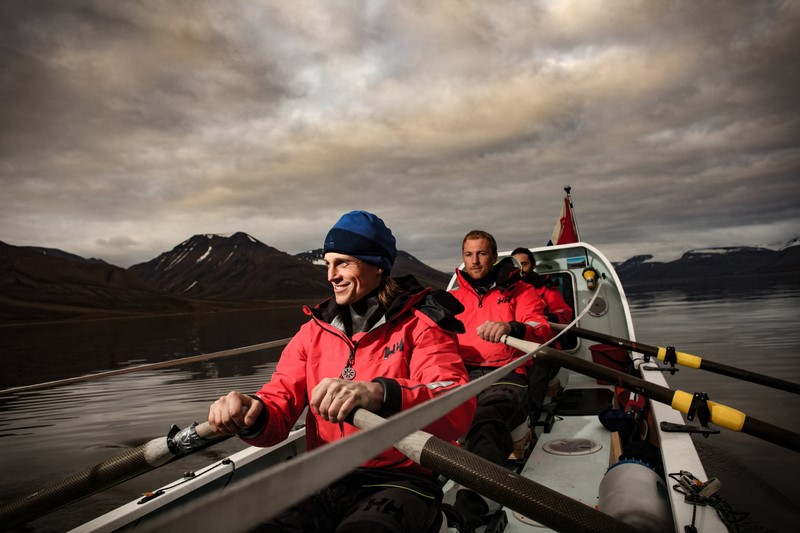
Fiann Paul, Alex Gregory and Carlo Facchino ocean rowing aboard Polar Row II

== Arctic Ocean rowing ==
Polar Row (composed of Polar Row I and Polar Row II) in total covered 1251 Nautical Miles measured in a straight line (1440 Miles or 2361 km) in the Arctic Ocean and pioneered ocean rowing routes from Tromsø to Longyearbyen, from Longyearbyen to the Arctic Ice Shelf (79'55'500 N) and from the Arctic Ice Shelf to Jan Mayen. They became the most record-breaking ocean row and the most record-breaking man-powered expedition, claiming over a dozen world records in total.

Polar Row I: The fastest crossing of the Arctic Ocean was set in 2017 by a five-man crew aboard Polar Row I, (Fiann Paul, Tor Wigum, Tathagata Roy, Carlo Facchino, Jeff Willis) with a crossing time of 7 days and 7 hours, from Tromsø, Norway to Hornsund and next to Longyearbyen (additional 36h), Svalbard, with an average speed of 2,58 knots. In total they covered distance of 600 miles (521 nm) (965 km), breaking the existing Arctic Ocean overall speed record by 3,5 times. Polar Row I's triumph was the biggest record demolition in the history of Ocean Rowing. Arctic Ocean overall speed record was set higher than the Pacific Ocean overall speed record. Even more, it was the first recorded complete row across the Barents Sea. After this crossing captain Fiann Paul became the first person to row all 4 oceans. It was the 4th of 4 overall speed records claimed by Fiann Paul and upon this achievement he received Guinness Titles of: "First to row 4 Oceans" and "First to hold current speed records on all 4 oceans". The crew also broke the 27-years-standing record of Northernmost Latitude reached by a rowing vessel.

Polar Row II: In Longyearbyen 3 of the 5 crew members were replaced and one new member joined, forming the 6 man team of Polar Row II. The new rowers were Danny Longman, Alex Gregory, Samuel Vie and Tyler Carnevale. The crew rowed North to the Arctic Ice Shelf, reaching the northernmost latitude attained by a rowing vessel. The crew then turned South, to continue on their journey to Iceland. Heavy weather and equipment failure lead to a decision to change course, with the crew arriving safely in Jan Mayen under their own power. On Jan Mayen four of the six crew members decided they would not continue to Iceland for health reasons. Captain Fiann Paul and Carlo Facchino aimed to continue to Iceland which was an additional 350 nautical miles south.

Fiann organized Team Polar Row III (Fiann Paul, Carlo Facchino, James Plumley, Arnar Már Árnason, Gísli Hjartarson, Yngvi Yngvason) and attempted to have 4 new rowers transported to Jan Mayen by a private plane from Iceland, but the airplane didn't receive the landing permit due to military restrictions on Jan Mayen. After multiple attempts of trying to solve the logistics Fiann declared the expedition finished in Jan Mayen. Fiann Paul and Carlo Facchino became the first people to row the Arctic Ocean both directions.

== Circumnavigation of Britain ==
In 2005, four British army officers rowed around Great Britain in 26 days. Guinness World Records designated their effort as "fastest unsupported row circumnavigating UK mainland waters". In 2008 and 2009, the challenge was independently attempted again, each ending in failure.

In 2010, Sir Richard Branson sponsored the inaugural multi boat race, called Virgin GB Row 2010. Four crews entered but only two made it through rigorous scrutiny to the Start line. The men's crew in Orca were forced to retire as the boat lost its anchor at Wolf Rock, off Lands End, leaving the ladies crew to complete the race in 51 days, setting a world record as the fastest unsupported female four to complete the entire challenge, starting and finishing at Tower Bridge in London. The all female crew was composed of Belinda Kirk, 35, from Bristol, Royal Navy nurse Laura Thomasson, 23, from Kent, IT support manager Beverley Ashton, 29, from Oxfordshire, and former US Marine Angela Madsen, 50 from Long Beach, California, rowing Go Commando. In 2010, two Army doctors, Nick Dennison and Hamish Reid, circumnavigated Britain in a single journey in an ocean rowing boat. The pair started and finished in Lymington, and completed the 2,100-nautical-mile (3,900 km; 2,400 mi) journey in 50 days and 5 hours.

On 1 June 2013, 6 boats set off for the honours of World Records plus a chance at winning £100,000 to the first boat to beat the fastest time world record.

In 2018, Andrew Hodgson became the first person to row solo around Great Britain in a time of 175 days 2 hours and 51 minutes in his Rannoch R15 boat Spirit of Ahab.

== Southern Ocean rowing ==
A boat captained by Fiann Paul crossed the Drake Passage from Cape Horn to the Antarctic Peninsula in December 2019. The six-man crew also included first mate Colin O'Brady, Cameron Bellamy, Andrew Towne, Jamie Douglas Hamilton, and John Petersen. The row was the first entirely human-powered crossing of the Southern Ocean, taking 12 days, 1 hour, and 45 minutes.

== Mediterranean Sea Rowing ==
A biennial series of ocean rowing races in the Mediterranean Sea between Barcelona and Ibiza began in 2013. Organised by the NOMAN is an Island: Race to End HPV Campaign the record is held by Team Monex Europe, who completed the crossing of the Balearic Sea in 54h30 minutes in July 2019.

== See also ==
- Human-powered watercraft
