= Jim Shekhdar =

British ocean rower

Jim Shekhdar (born 13 November 1946) is a British ocean rower and was the first person to complete a solo unassisted non-stop crossing of the Pacific Ocean.

== Career ==
Shekhdar was born in Leamington Spa, England in 1946 and lived in India from the age of seven to twelve, where he learned Hindi. Back in England, he went to university where he studied civil engineering. Shekhdar was a keen water polo player but stopped playing after a falling out with the British Water Polo Administration for claiming airfare to an International match. In Sydney, he helped Universities Water Polo Club capture the NSW 1st Grade premiership for the 1971/72 season, and was selected in the New South Wales Mens Water Polo Team, which placed third at the Australian Water Polo Championships held at Musgrave Park Pool in Brisbane.

He stayed in Australia for a year and a half playing Rugby and working as an engineer. He then moved on to Papua New Guinea, Africa, the Middle East, New Zealand and Las Vegas. He finally returned to England, where he was permitted to play water polo again, but was banned for life one more time after throwing a referee into the water. He had two daughters: Anna who was studying medicine during his ocean crossing and is now an emergency medicine consultant, and Sarah who is a navigator in the Royal Air Force. He divorced Jane and is now married to Nina Shekhdar (née Hlochova) with two young daughters: Natalie (born 2008) and Alice (born 2011). They all live in Cornwall.

== Ocean rowing ==
Shekhdar became interested in ocean rowing after reading John Ridgway's book about his transatlantic row with Chay Blyth. He initially wanted to start a corporate team building style venture with either Ridgway or Blyth but neither were interested.

In 1997, he heard about the Port St Charles Atlantic Rowing Race organised by Sir Chay's company, Challenge Business, and entered with David Jackson. They rowed from Tenerife to Barbados in sixty five days.

=== Rowing the Pacific ===
The Atlantic race had given Shekhdar a taste for ocean rowing and his sights soon turned to the Pacific. Peter Bird had rowed across the Pacific already but he had stopped in Hawaii and eventually ended up being rescued by the Australian Navy 33 miles from the Australian mainland. The way was still open therefore for a solo unassisted non-stop crossing. Shekhdar had an arthritic hip and was on the waiting list for a replacement but decided to delay the operation in order to complete the row even though he was in pain.

Bird had set off from San Francisco and had run aground on Hawaii. To avoid the same fate, Shekhdar decided to set out from South America which he felt offered a clearer route across the Pacific. He originally chose Chile but was denied permission and set off from Peru instead.

Jim Shekhdar describes his boat ("Le Shark") as a "big boat", weighing 800 kg with a steel keel (and not custom designed for this event). Its length is estimated at 7 meters.

Shekhdar set off from Peru on 29 June 2000 and arrived in Australia on 30 March 2001 having rowed approximately 8,000 miles in 274 days. During the voyage, he had ten encounters with sharks and a near miss with a tanker. Shekhdar originally thought the voyage would take only eight months and towards the end he almost ran out of food.

On arriving at North Stradbrooke Island off Brisbane, his boat overturned and he had to swim the remaining thirty meters where his wife and children were waiting.

== Other adventures ==
In 2003, Jim Shekhdar unsuccessfully attempted to row solo from Bluff, NZ, to Cape Town, and had to be rescued by New Zealand organisations, He tried again later, and had to be rescued again, in an operation costing a six-figure sum.

== Author ==
In 2001 Shekhdar released a book about his adventures entitled, Jim Shekhdar. Bold Man of the Sea. My Epic Journey.
