= Chris Martin (rower) =

British rower (born 1981)

Chris Martin (born 27 January 1981 in Chertsey, Surrey, England) is a British rower.

== Early rowing career ==
Martin started rowing at 14 at Hampton School. At the end of his third year of rowing he raced as part of the British team and remained part of the British rowing team at six World Rowing Championships returning with a medal from each.

1997 Hazewinkel, Belgium : World Junior Championships JM8+ 3rd

1998 Ottensheim, Austria : World Junior Championships JM4+ 3rd

1999 Plovdiv, Bulgaria : World Junior Championships JM4- 2nd

2000 Copenhagen, Denmark : Nations Cup M4+ 1st

2001 Ottensheim, Austria : U23 World Championships M4- 2nd

2001 Lucerne, Switzerland : World Rowing Championships M4+ 3rd

Martin also competed in the World Cup races in 2002 but without repeating his earlier medal winning form.

2002 Nottingham, United Kingdom : Commonwealth Regatta M2- 3rd

== Ocean rowing ==
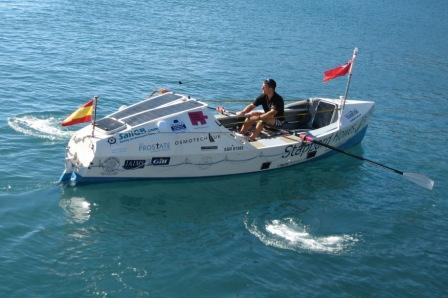
Martin rowing Pacific Pete in the 2005 Atlantic Rowing Race

Having been dropped from the GB squad, Martin turned his attention to ocean rowing and in 2005/06 he rowed across the Atlantic Ocean solo, as part of the Woodvale Atlantic Rowing Race in 68 days, 15 hours and 19 minutes to become the 31st solo ocean rower to cross the Atlantic Ocean on the East to West route. During his row he also conducted observations on the ocean currents affecting his boat Pacific Pete for Earth & Space Research as part of Ocean Surface Current Analyses Real-time (OSCAR).

Martin remained an active member within the ocean rowing community and was one of the co-founders of the Association of Ocean Rowers.

In 2006, Martin joined a team of Royal Marines Reserves in a row from London to Paris as part of their preparations for breaking the record for the Atlantic east to west route.

After this Martin spent three years preparing for a double handed row with Mick Dawson. On 8 May 2009, Martin and Dawson set off from Choshi, Japan into the north Pacific Ocean. After an eventful journey where the crew sighted the US Naval research vessel SBX-1. and ran out of food requiring a helicopter resupply from Wayne Lackey 189 Days, 10 Hours, 55 Minutes after the pair set out from Japan they rowed their boat Bojangles underneath the Golden Gate Bridge on Friday 13 November 2009.

In 2010, Martin and Dawson were awarded a Guinness World Record for being the first team to row across the North Pacific Ocean. The footage they filmed on their trip was turned into a documentary presented by James Cracknell for Discovery Channel and was aired for the first time on 10 May 2012.

In 2011, Martin founded the New Ocean Wave, to manage the Great Pacific Race from Monterey, California to Honolulu, Hawaii, to be run in 2014. Accomplished ocean rower Roz Savage is also part of the New Ocean Wave organising team as a race consultant.

In 2013, Martin organized the biennial NOMAN Barcelona to Ibiza race, on behalf of the HPV and Anal Cancer Foundation. This was the first ocean rowing race to take place on the waters of the Mediterranean Sea and saw two identical boats of five rowers race. Future editions of the event saw up to 6 boats participating and races occur both from Barcelona to Ibiza and a return leg of the race from Ibiza back to Barcelona. The event continues to operate every 2 years and thus far has raised in excess of £2 million for the charity.

In 2014, Martin was the Race Director for the first ever Great Pacific Race and oversaw the organisation of the event heading up the race management team. The Great Pacific Race made history with 14 Guinness World Records being applied for following this successful event.

In 2015, Martin became part of the steering committee for the Ocean Rowing Society.

In 2016 and 2018 Martin returned as the Race Director for the Great Pacific Race overseeing 11 crews attempt at completing the route. Ownership of the race then passed hands but Martin was retained as the event's Safety Officer for the 2021 and 2022 events.

From 2023 until present day, Martin has been the safety officer for the Atlantic Dash.

Martin continued to supply ocean rowing support to independent ocean rowers taking part in passages of the Atlantic, Pacific, Arctic and Antarctic oceans.

== Politics ==
Martin stood as a paper candidate in 2022 in the Byfleet ward for the Liberal Democrats. The next year he was voted onto Woking Borough Council as a member of the Liberal Democrats for the ward of Pyrford.
