= Jasmine Harrison =

British adventurer

Jasmine Harrison (born c. 2000) is a British adventurer. She holds the record as the youngest woman to complete a solo ocean rowing crossing of the Atlantic Ocean, achieving the feat in February 2021 aged 21 as part of the Atlantic Rowing Race. The following year she became the first woman to swim the length of Great Britain from Land's End to John O'Groats, covering a journey of 900 miles in 109 days. In March 2026, she completed a solo circumnavigation of the globe in a 19 ft (5.8m) plywood yacht as part of the Mini Globe Race, taking 381 days. She is from Thirsk, North Yorkshire, England, and is a swimming coach and lifeguard.

In 2021, she was named in the Forbes 30 Under 30 Europe Sports & Games list.
