= Leven Brown =

British ocean rower

Leven Brown, British ocean rower

Leven Brown (born 14 August 1972) is a British ocean rower and skipper from the Scottish Borders. He has held five Guinness World Records, including the fastest team row of the North Atlantic from New York to the Isles of Scilly in 2010 and the fastest team crossing of the Indian Ocean in 2014. With Don Lennox, Livar Nysted and Ray Carroll he also held the record for the longest distance rowed in 24 hours in an ocean rowing boat, at 118 miles. He has held North Atlantic and Trade Winds (mid-Atlantic) speed records at the same time, and speed records on two oceans.

Brown was brought up on a landlocked farm in the Scottish Borders. After 17 years with Brewin Dolphin he completed his first ocean row in 2005, from mainland Spain to the West Indies, a Guinness World Record for the first person to make that crossing. He went on to skipper mixed crews on the Atlantic and Indian Oceans.

He is an RYA/MCA yachtmaster. Brown has been nominated for a National Geographic Adventurer award and a Glenfiddich Spirit of Scotland Award, and was awarded the Freedom of the City of Edinburgh.

== 2005 First Expedition 'The Columbus Run' Cadiz - Tobago ==
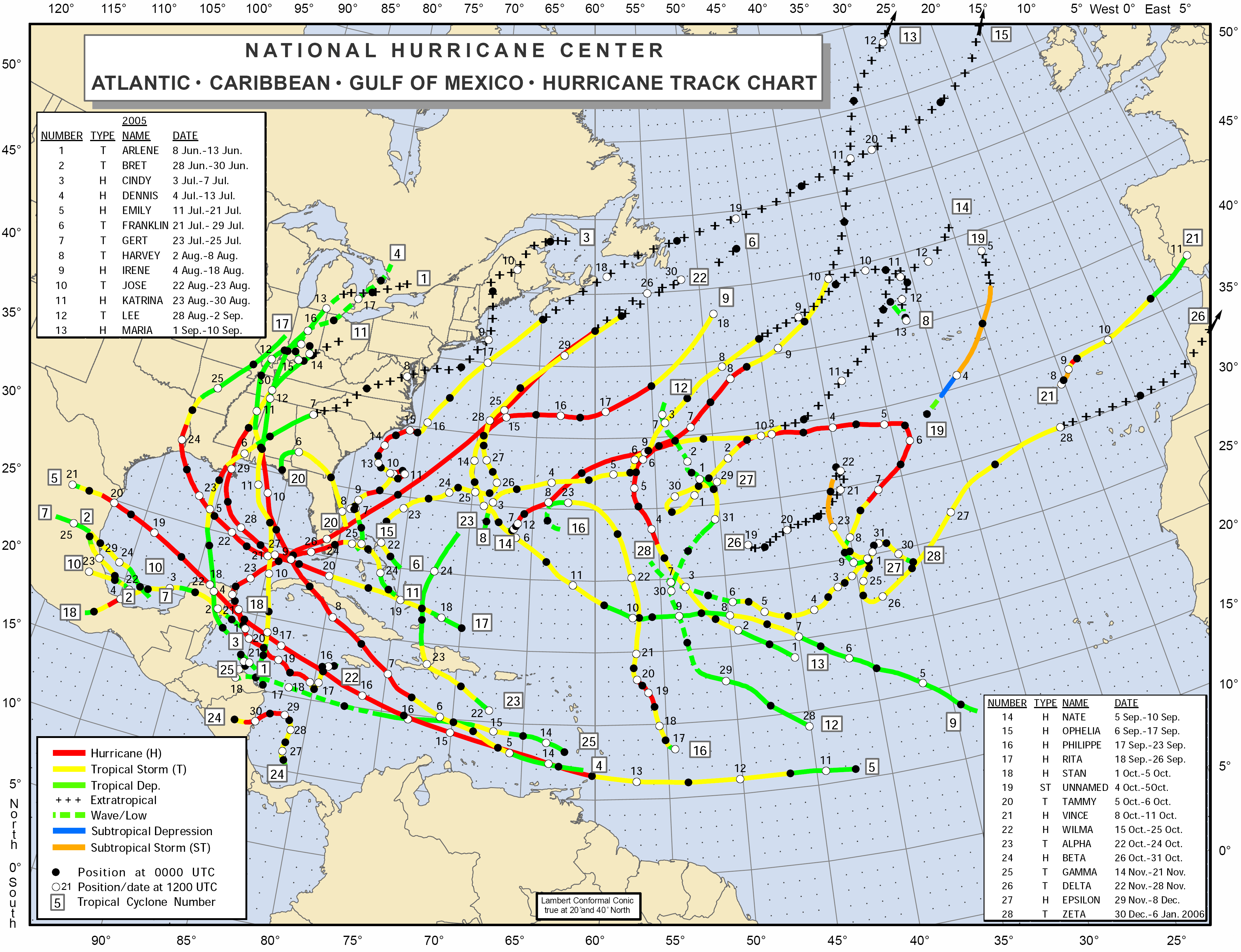
Atlantic hurricanes and storms in 2005

On the first expedition Brown set off solo on 14 August 2005 on a journey. He spent a total of 123 days at sea and covered 4278 miles. There were four named storms on Brown's first voyage: Vince, Delta, Epsilon and Zeta. 2005 was the busiest hurricane season on record. Brown supported 'The Sportsman's Charity' and the Edinburgh 'One City Trust' on this voyage. Brown received a Guinness world record for being the first person to row from mainland Spain to the West Indies.

== 2007/8 Mid Atlantic - Gran Canaria - Barbados Expedition - speed record ==
2007/8 - Brown's second voyage was as skipper with a 14-man crew on a 50 ft ocean rowing boat called La Mondiale. He and his crew rowed 3000 miles from Gran Canaria to Barbados in 33 days 7 hours 30 minutes beating the record of that time. Several charities were represented by the crew. The previous record was set by a French team in 1992 of 35 days 8 hours 30 minutes in the same boat.

== 2009 Mid Atlantic - Gran Canaria - Barbados Expedition - speed record attempt ==
2009 - The third voyage in La Mondiale was cut short by the irreparable damage to the rudder after a collision with an unknown submerged object. The 14 crew were evacuated safely onto a passing ship Island Ranger but the boat was lost presumed sunk some 1000 miles from the Canary Islands. Several charities were represented by the crew.

== 2010 North Atlantic USA, New York - Isles of Scilly, UK Expedition - speed record ==
2010 - The North Atlantic, Brown's fourth voyage. As skipper he picked his crew, all of which he had rowed oceans with before, Don Lennox (Scotland), Livar Nysted (Faroe Islands), Ray Carroll (Ireland). They were attempting to beat the long-standing North Atlantic speed record set in 1896 by Norwegians Frank Samuelsen and George Harbo which had stood at 55 days 7 hours for some 114 years. Their boat Artemis Investments left New York City on 17 June 2010 and arrived in St Mary's on 31 July 2010 in a time of 43 days 21 hours 26 minutes and 48 seconds. Which remains the record to date for the North Atlantic. During their voyage they were capsized twice in storms.

== 2013 Mid Atlantic Gran Canaria - Barbados Expedition - speed record attempt - maiden voyage Avalon ==
2013 - The Trade Winds Route, Puerto Mogan, Gran Canaria to Port St Charles, Barbados, 3000 miles. Leven Brown skippered his new ocean rowing racing boat Avalon, with a crew of eight. He set the fastest team time that year narrowly beating rival boat Titan. Brown's time was 35 days 12 hours 41 minutes. Several charities were represented by the crew.

== 2014 Geraldton, Australia - Seychelles, Africa Expedition - speed record - Indian Ocean ==
Leven Brown, Seychelles 2014 after completing his Indian Ocean Voyage

2014 - The Indian Ocean - 4579 Miles Rowed From Geraldton, Australia to Victoria, Mahe, Seychelles. Crew of seven. Brown's first mixed crew. Set two more world records - Speed record across the Indian Ocean 57 days 10 hours 58 minutes - with an average speed of 2.65 knots. Brown's original intention was to go for Durban, South Africa however early in the voyage a set of three storms knocked them too far north to make this landfall. They then changed course to head for Mombasa in Kenya but owing to rising terrorism the British Foreign and Commonwealth Office recommended no travel to Kenya. They then changed course and landed on the Seychelles. Brown had to evacuate Dr Shane Usher due to him being severely burned by boiling water mid ocean reducing the crew down to six. A critical steering cable broke on Avalon which forced the crew to manually steer the boat which reduced the rowing deck down to two rowers per shift - half what it is meant to be.[] [] On the way into the Seychelles they had an incident with a suspected pirate vessel. Brown bluffed that they were in fact a Royal Navy 'Q' boat and that they were rendezvousing with their frigate in 30 minutes. The suspected pirate vessel then fled. This was called his 'Captain Phillips' moment. Brown supported Save the Elephants as a charity.

== 2015 Mid Atlantic Gran Canaria - Barbados Expedition - speed record attempt - boat Avalon ==
2015 - The Trade Winds Route, Puerto Mogan, Gran Canaria to Port St Charles, Barbados, 3000 miles. Leven Brown Skippered Ocean Rowing racing boat Avalon again, with a crew of eight. Six men and two women including Thato Mabelane who became the first African woman to row an ocean. It was the most international crew Brown had Skippered containing five nationalities including South Africa, Brazilian, Irish, English, and Scots. The crossing was marred by steering failure again within the first 24 hours but they managed to manually steer for the entire course. The boat's rudder was attacked by a great white shark estimated to be 4 – 5 m in length. There was little damage. The Voyage took 43days 12hours 55 mins. In the final approach the Avalon was blown out to sea by gale force winds 2 miles from Port St Charles, Barbados and was towed into calmer waters to finish. The crew rowed circa 3250 miles. Leven Brown became only the second man in history to cross two different oceans in a rowing boat within a year - the first being his great friend, fellow rower and teammate Livar Nysted - Brown did the Indian Ocean In June 2014 and the Atlantic in January 2015. Brown again supported the 'Save the Elephants' charity.

== 2016 Partial Atlantic Crossing ==
Brown was called to join one of his friends, Steve Murphy, who was in trouble during the Atlantic Rowing Race La Gomera to English Harbour, Antigua, 3000 miles. He joined 34 days into the voyage approximately 300 miles into the race. The whole voyage was 80 days 20h 39mins. Brown was dropped off via the race Support boat and almost drowned getting to 'Layla' because of a corroded safety clip which trapped him under the boat when trying to reach Murphy.

== 2023 Northwest Passage ==
In 2023 Brown skippered an eight-person attempt to row the Northwest Passage in a single season in the ocean rowing boat Hermione. After a motor-assisted transit from Scotland, the crew began rowing from Pond Inlet, Nunavut, on 17 August 2023. Late ice and strong winds delayed the start.[] They reached Cambridge Bay, roughly the midpoint of the passage, where local advice and worsening weather (stronger than forecast winds, continued low pressure, and the approach of ice) led them to stop for the season. The team had rowed about 1,000 miles. Hermione was left to overwinter at Cambridge Bay, with the intention of returning in 2024. []

== 2024 Northwest Passage ==
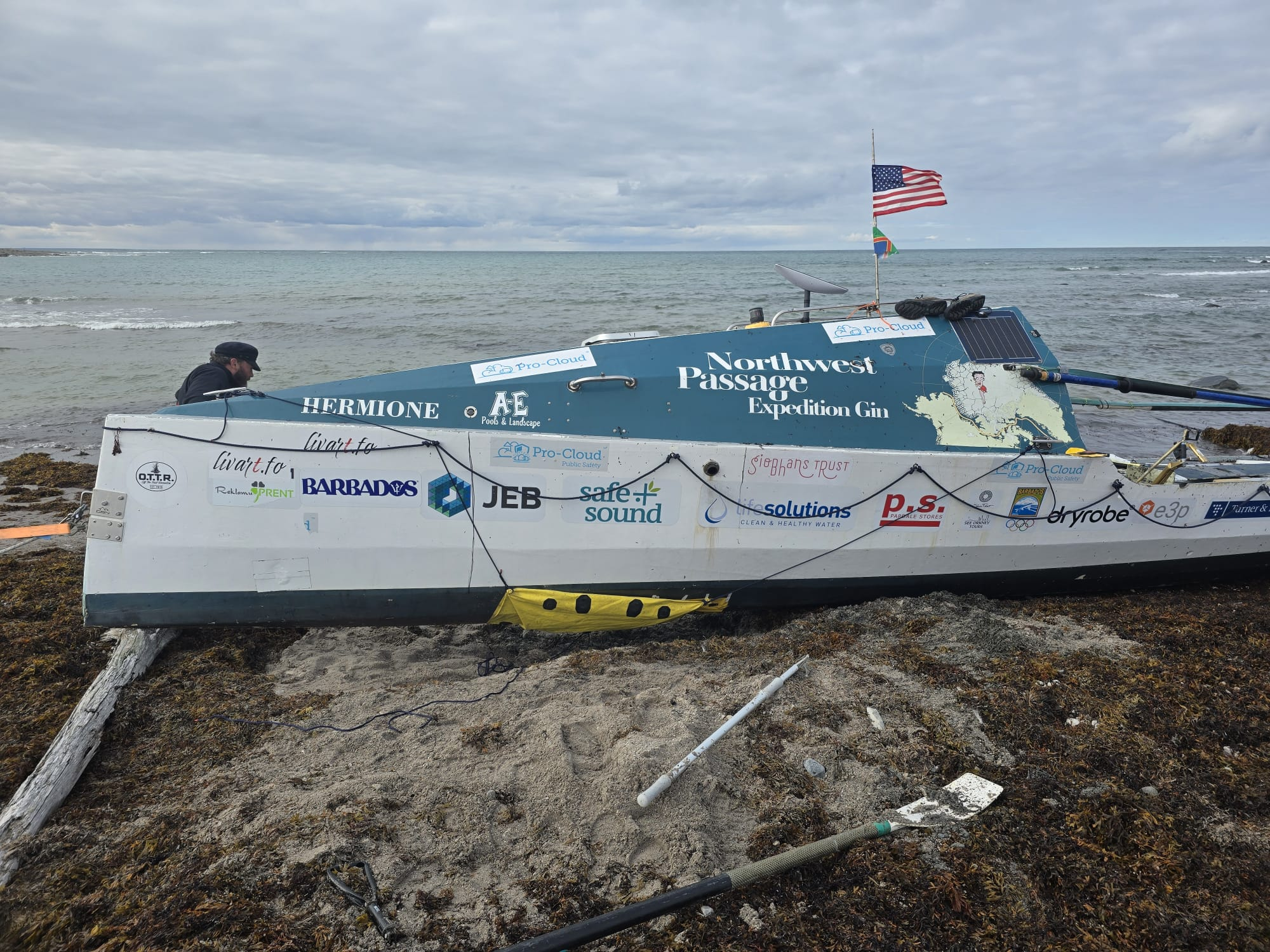
Photo of the repair to Ocean Rowing Boat 'Hermione'

In 2024 Brown Skippered a smaller crew resumed from Cambridge Bay. to continue the Northwest Passage in the boat Hermione. []After a storm at Cape Hope destroyed the boat’s anchor system, Hermione was driven onto rocks and holed through two watertight bulkheads. The crew made a temporary repair using dry bags to patch up the hole and, after an emergency engine failed, rowed and bailed for about ten days, covering roughly 250 miles to Paulatuk, Northwest Territories. The expedition ended there just short of the western boundary of the Passage.[]

== 2024/2025 Round Britain Expedition ==
In 2024 an anticlockwise record attempt around Britain in Nanook (Counternavig8) did not start and was postponed until 2025. [] In 2025 the project continued as a clockwise attempt, Row with the Flow GB. The Ocean Rowing Society records the crew rowing only from Eyemouth to Lowestoft between 9 and 26 July 2025 before the expedition was listed as incomplete formally ending on the 16th of August in Port Edgar, Edinburgh [] after some of the crew decided to call it a day with continuing weather uncertainties and time constraints [..[That year the GB Row Challenge’s published results list recorded no completed circumnavigations; other 2025 attempts also ended short, including 52 Degrees North, which the Ocean Rowing Society notes finished at Scrabster because of Storm Floris.[]
