= Charles Hedrich =

French sportsman, alpinist, rower and skipper

Charles Hedrich (born 3 March 1958 in Lyon) is a French sportsman, alpinist, rower and skipper. He is known for his achievements on all terrains of the world: Ocean (Vendée Globe, ...), climbing (Everest, ...), pole (North Pole, ...), desert (Dakar moto, ...), and forest (Amazon, ...).

He also participates in international competitions : Ultra Trail du Mont Blanc, Pierre Menta, Enduro du Touquet, 100 km de Millau, IronMan, etc.

== September 2020: Manaslu ==
Charles Hedrich is aiming to ski from 8,163 metres above sea level. Manaslu is the eight highest peak in the world. Located in the Gorkha District of Nepal, it is the highest peak of the region.

== Biography ==
In 2008 Charles founded the association Respectons la Terre to promote adventure Sport and exploration across the world.

He did his military service in St Cyr, Coëtquidan. He became Chief of Combat Section at the 13th Battalion of Modane Alpine Chasseurs.

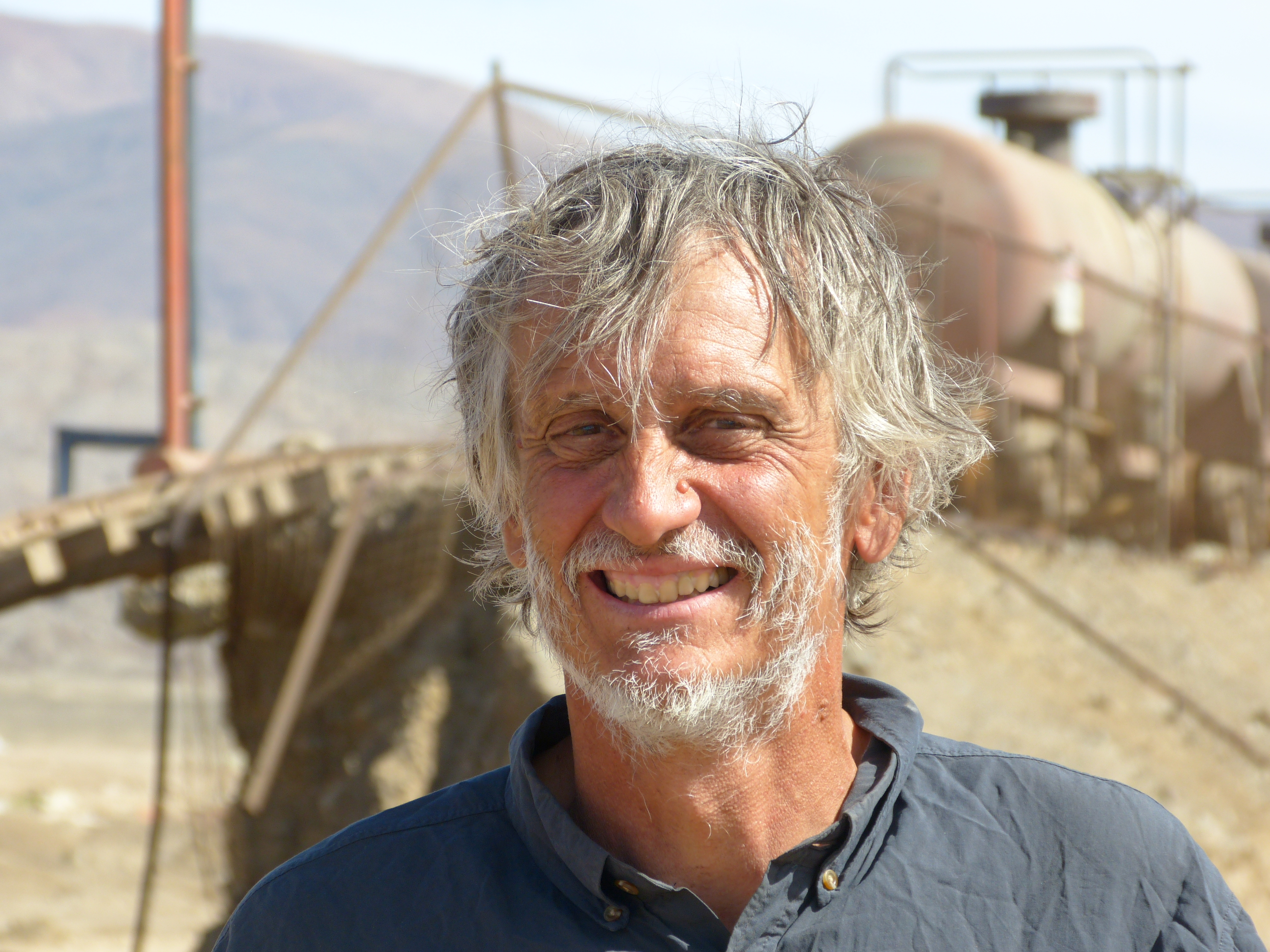

Sales Director for 13 years, he created his company in France, then developed in Europe and the United States. Initial public offering in 1997, he sold his share of the company in 2001. He then became passionate about adventure sports.

In 2003, he finished sixth in the category (motorcycles under 400 cm3). Also in 2003, he finished the Calais Round Britain Race and broke the race record for the Dover-Calais crossing.

In 2004, he announced his intention to participate in the 2004-2005 Vendée Globe. A dispute with the owner of his boat led him to make the decision to go off-race. He will finish the tour solo, non-stop trip in 122 days.

In 2006, he climbed Everest by the Tibetan route.

In 2007, he set a new world record for rowing across the Atlantic Ocean between Dakar (Senegal) and Guara Point (Brazil).

In December 2007, he tried to beat Børge Ousland's speed record by reaching the South Pole from Berkner Island (total distance: 1,310 km) alone and in full autonomy. He suffered from a urinary tract infection that forced him to stop after 550 kilometres.

In 2009, together with Arnaud Tortel, achieved a world premiere: the autonomous crossing from the North Pole to Greenland without refuelling in 62 days.

In the same year, he sailed solo from Upernavik to Resolute Bay on the Glory of the Sea and then sailed the Northwest Passage to the Aleutian Islands with a crew member. In June 2010, the boat reached the port of Arsenal in Paris where it stopped for a few months.

In 2010, he went on a ski and mountaineering expedition to Afghanistan with Nadjib Sirat, the first Afghan on Mont Blanc. They skied 20 kilometres from Kabul and mountaineered in Panshire. Nadjib Sirat then created the first Afghan ski and mountaineering federation.

In 2011, he participates in international competitions of reference: Pierra menta in March ( finished 161st with Marc Rosaz ), Ironman de Nice in June (finished in 13 h 05 min 44 s) and Ultra-trail du Mont-blanc in August (finished in 44 h 28 min 48 s).

In the autumn of 2012, he achieved a world premiere: the round-trip crossing of the North Atlantic Ocean. He rowed for 145 days and covered 11,000 km between Saint-Pierre-et-Miquelon and Martinique.

Summer 2013 in another rowing premiere: he rowed Northwest Passage solo, 6000 km across the Arctic Ocean with a 160 kg carbon kevlar prototype.

Season 1: Charles Hedrich leaves the Bering Strait on July 1, 2013, paddles along all the coasts of northern Alaska, travels 3000 km and stops for the winter season with an Inuit family in Tuktoyaktuk, a hamlet in the far north of Canada.

Season 2: Charles Hedrich start again after winter on July 12, 2014, from Tuktoyaktuk, on September 5, 2014, after an additional 2000 km of travel, the adventurer is stopped by a 250 km compact ice cap. He organizes his boat for the winter in Taloyoak, an Inuit village in Canada's Far North. He has 1,000 kilometres of rowing left to reach the exit of the mythical Baffin Sea Passage.

Waiting for season 3, Charles Hedrich goes for another world premiere: crossing the Atacama desert on its Chilean part in autonomy without any supplies. 1300 km to cover with a tow truck weighing up to 150 kg loaded, in the highest and driest desert in the world. He left Arica, a city located in the far north of Chile, on April 7, 2015, and arrived in Copiapo on May 9, 2015, after 32 days and 5h30 of expedition.

A few months later, back to the Northwest Passage.

Season 3: On August 13, 2015, he leaves Taloyoak for the most northerly part of the passage. This year, if the ice is not as compact as the year before, but the headwinds are there. The progression is slow, the adventurer sometimes advances at 1 km/h, but the kilometers are done. On September 16 at 4pm (local time), after 3 seasons, 2 winter seasons, 6000 km, 165 days of rowing from the Bering Strait, Charles Hedrich arrived in Pond Inlet and completed the 1st Northwest Passage solo and by rowing.

Since 2014, he has been hosting a section called "Where is Charlie?" in the morning of Radio Nova in which he tells about one of his adventures. He is also a columnist for other media such as Le Dauphiné Libéré and Radio Mont Blanc.

In 2016, he began the 1st Tour de France with the same rowing he succeeded the 1st Northwest Passage. The challenge: to complete a continuous tour, 5 months of expedition, 3,000 km to cover and more than 505 locks to cross. He leaves on May 20 from the Quai d'Austerlitz in Paris. The different stages are: Seine river, Marne river, the side canal to the Marne, the canal between Champagne and Burgundy, the Petite Saône, Saône river, Rhône river, the canal du Rhône to Sète, the canal du Midi, the canal to the Garonne, the Garonne, the Garonne, Gironde river, Atlantic Ocean, the Vilaine, the canal d'Ille-et-Rance, the Sée, Orne river, the English channel, the Somme, the Oise, Seine river.... for an arrival at the Champs-Élysées port in Paris on 20 October 2016.

2017-2018: Walking expedition in the Sahara and Taklamakan deserts.

2019: Climbing Expedition to Muztagata (7546 m China). Skiing down from the summit with his son Frantz Hedrich on August 8, 2019.

2019: Solar Off Road: First trip with a 100% solar powered land vehicle, crossing the Simpson Desert. Charles Hedrich crossed the Simpson desert in Australia on a swincar. It became the first ever marketed and approved for road use vehicle to cross a desert using 100% solar energy. It took him 12 days to accomplish the 803 kilometers, averaging 67 kilometers per 24 hours.

== Respectons La Terre Association ==
Charles Hedrich's expeditions and adventures are part of Respectons la Terre association, which federates sports adventurers and carries out awareness-raising activities on the ground with, in particular, young people from Seine-Saint-Denis.

== Achievements ==
- 2019: : Solar off road 100% solar. First to cross the Simpson desert in Australia on a marketed and approved for road use vehicle using 100% solar energy.
- 2019: Climbing Expedition to Muztagata (7546 m China). Skiing down from the summit with his son Frantz Hedrich on August 8, 2019.
- 2017-2018: Walking expedition in the Sahara and Taklamakan deserts.
- 2016: First ever Rowing France tour.
- 2015: World record crossing Atacama by foot in 32 days.
- 2013-2015 : Another rowing premiere: he rowed Northwest Passage solo (6000 km)
- 2012 : Is the first man to row across the Atlantic Ocean twice, solo, unassisted and without stopping. 145 days alone at sea, rowing over 11,000 km (6,800 mi).
- 2011 : Ultra Trail of Mont Blanc, Ironman Nice, and the Pierra Menta; a series of long-distance endurance races and challenges.
- February 2010 : Skiing and climbing expeditions in Panshire, Afghanistan and 20 km from central Kabul with sportsman Nadjib Sirat.
- 2009–2010 : World's first Tour du Monde by the two poles in the Glory of the Sea.
- September 2009 : Sailed the Northwest Passage solo
- April–June 2009 : Completes the first crossing from the North Pole to Greenland in 62 days with fellow explorer Arnaud Tortel. Without refreshment or aid.
- December 2008 : 550 km solo Antarctic expedition
- 23 January 2007 : Record Atlantic crossing from Dakhar to Brazil in 36 days and 6 hours
- 17 May 2006 : Charles reaches the summit of Everest by the Tibetan route.
- October 2004 – February 2005 : Sailed solo without stop or assistance around the world as part of the Vendée Globe, completing in 122 days.
- 24 July 2003 : Record channel crossing from Dover to Calais as part of the Calais Round Britain Race. Completing it in 1hour 18minutes and 50seconds in Open Objectif3.
