= Ellis Brigham =

Retailer for outdoor pursuits

Ellis Brigham is a retailer of mountain sports equipment for skiing, snowboarding, mountaineering, hiking and climbing, based in Manchester, England, with 24 shops across the United Kingdom.

== History ==
Frederick Ellis Brigham founded the company in 1933. The made walking boots and cycling shoes after opening a shop in Harpurhey in the 1930s. Brigham passed away in the late 1950s, and the company was passed on to his sons, Bob and Ellis.
