= Ray Carroll (rower) =

Irish rower

Ray Carroll (born 1977) is an Irish rower.

A native of Salthill, Galway, Carroll was part of a four-man crew that set a new record for trans-Atlantic rowing in August 2010. His crewmates were skipper Leven Brown (37), Don Lennox (41), and Livar Nysted (39), their ship the Artemis Investments. The crew set a new record of forty-three days, twenty-one hours, twenty-six minutes and forty-eight seconds to complete the three thousand miles from New York City to the Scilly Isles. The previous record was set by Norwegians George Harbo and Frank Samuelsen in 1896. They departed New York 17 June 2010.

Carroll has been a rower since aged eleven, when he joined the rowing team of Galway's Colaiste Iognaid ('the Jes'). He competed for Ireland in a Junior World Championship, a European Championship, and a World Student Games. After finishing his education he became a marine engineer and sailed in the merchant navy for twelve years.

In 2007 he joined Brown and Lennox on the Atlantic in La Mondiale. Carroll raised more than €90,000 for depression charity Aware in memory of his brother, Aiden, who died in 1997. Carroll chose the charity Jigsaw, which is a free and confidential support service for 15- to 25-year-olds in Galway city and county.
