= Livar Nysted =

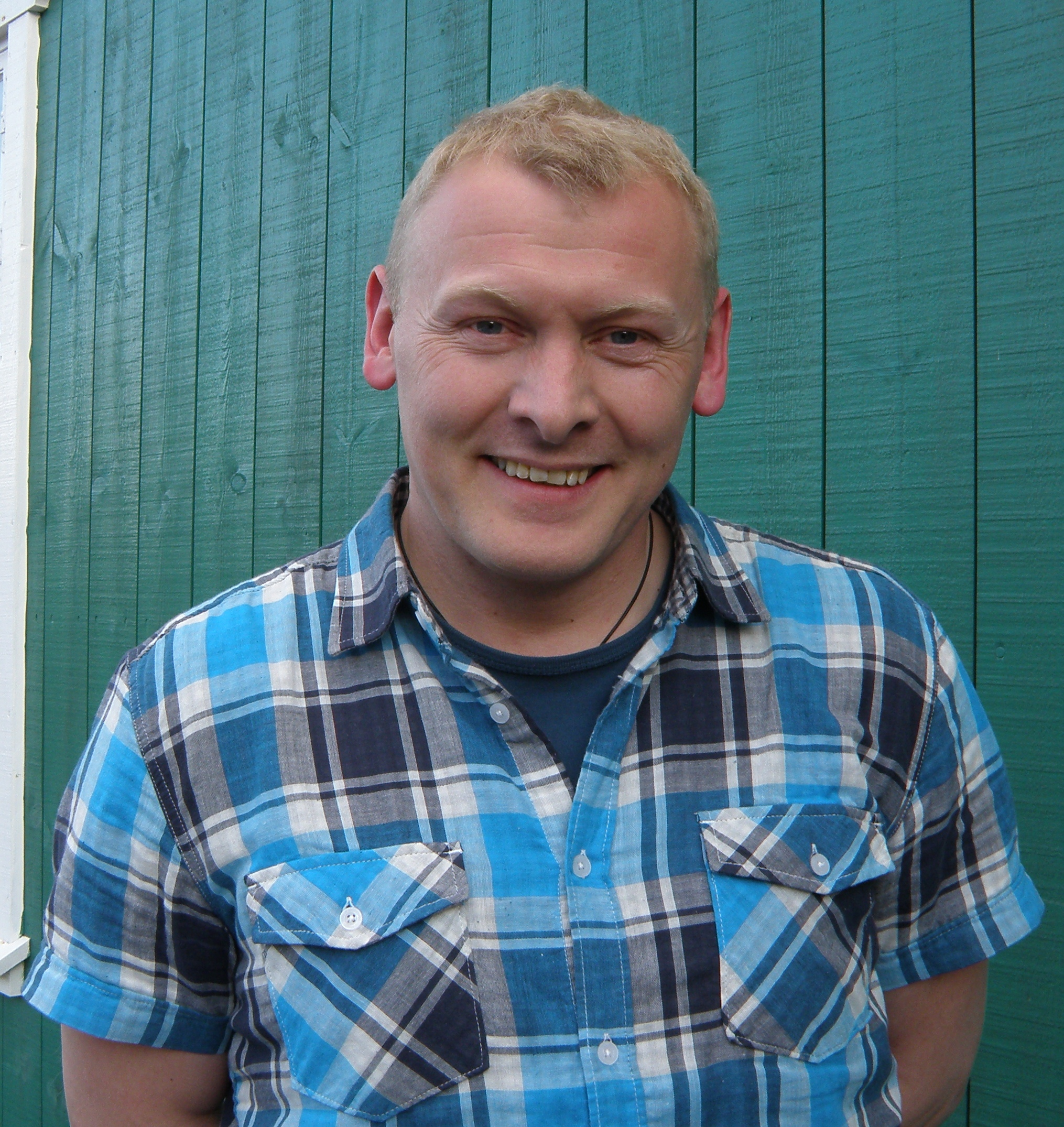
Nysted in 2012

Livar Nysted (born 27 September 1970) is an ocean rower and painter.

== Career ==
=== Faroese Champion in Ocean Rowing in Fjords and Sounds (Kappróður) ===
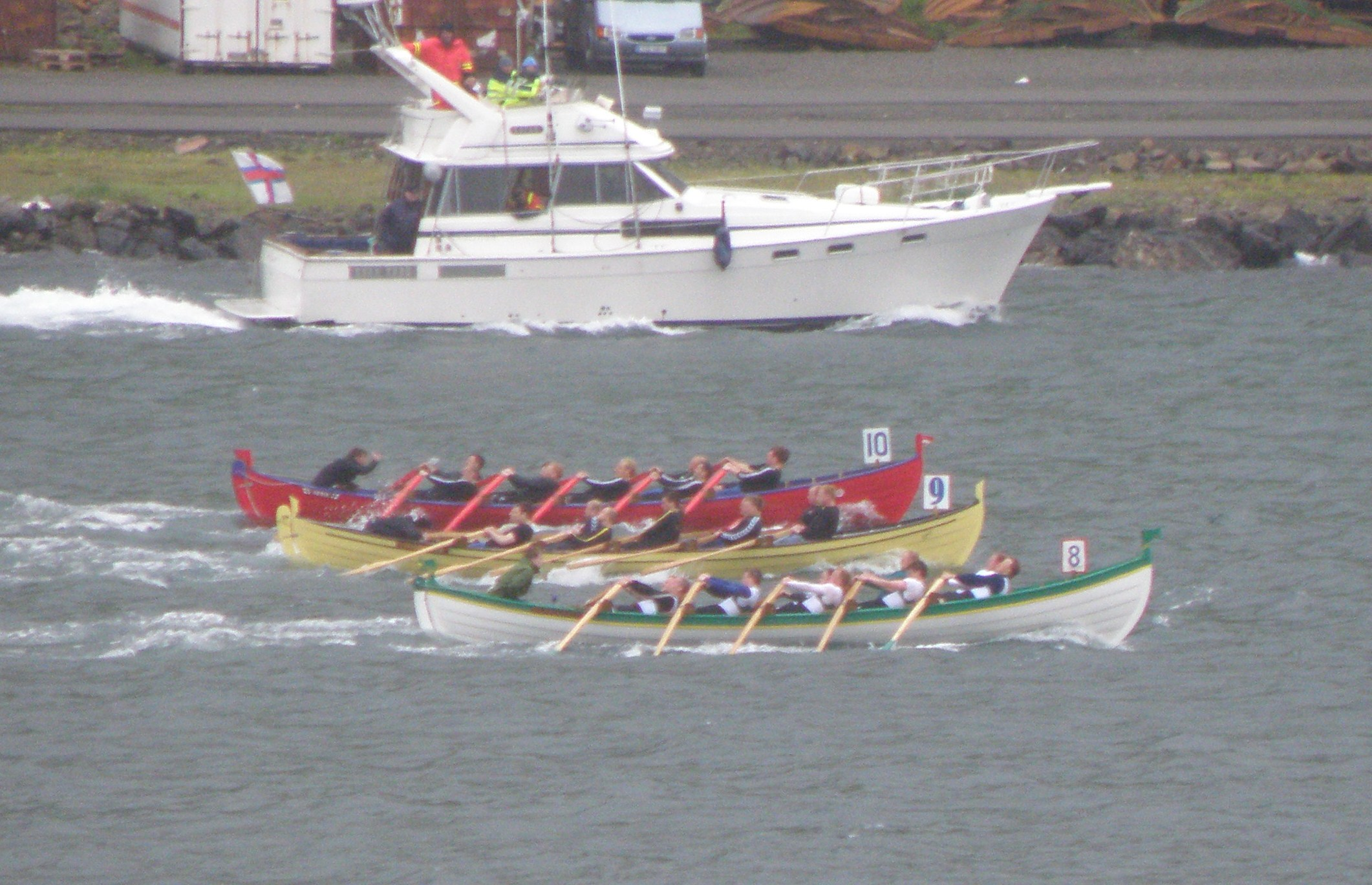
Kappróður at Jóansøka 2010, 10-mannafør. The yellow boat is Eysturoyingur, in which Livar Nysted won the Faroese Championship in 2007. He was not one of the rowers in this race, at this time he was crossing the North Atlantic.

Livar Nysted has won the Faroese Championship in outdoor rowing three times: in 2001, 2004 and 2007. There are six events held around the islands every summer, the winner gets 7 points, number two gets 5 points, number three gets 4 points etc. The boat which gets most points after all six boat races wins the Faroese Championship.

- 2001 Faroese Champion with the boat Nevið Reyða, 8-mannafar, they got 40 points, they won 5 of 6 competitions that year (only men are rowing in this boat size), Klaksvíkar Róðrarfelag (Rowing Club from Klaksvík)
- 2004 Faroese Champion with the boat Sundabáturin, the men's 6-mannafar, Norðdepils-Hvannasunds Róðrarfelag (Rowing Club from Norðdepil and Hvannasund)
- 2007 Faroese Champion with the boat Eysturoyingur, 10-mannafar (only men are rowing in this boat size), Kappróðrarfelagið NSÍ (Rowing Club from Runavík)

=== His first attempts in long distance ocean rowing in 2003 and 2005 ===
In 2003, Livar Nysted and nine other Faroese men made an attempt to row from the Faroe Islands to the Shetland Islands in a Faroese rowing boat, just like the Faroese ocean rower Ove Joensen did all by himself in 1986. The boat was called Norðoyingur, which means a person who comes from the Northern Islands (Norðoyggjar) in the Faroes. They got bad weather and had to give up after 24 hours. Two years later in 2005 he tried again this time with another crew and another boat, which was called Havrenningur. They almost made it, they saw the coast of the Shetland Islands, but they were more or less ordered to give up, because of bad weather, and so they did. Their trip ended after 6 days, and they were only 18 miles from the shore. A boat from the Shetland Coast Guard dragged them to land.

=== La Mondiale in 2009 ===
In 2009, Livar Nysted was one of the crew members of La Mondiale, which made an attempt to cross the South Atlantic Ocean, it was a speed record attempt. The boat was cut short by the irreparable damage to the rudder after a collision with an unknown submerged object. The 14 crew were evacuated safely onto a passing ship 'Island Ranger' but the boat was lost presumed sunk some 1000 miles from the Canary Islands.

=== Crossing the North Atlantic in 2010 - Two World Records were broken ===
Livar Nysted along with captain Leven Brown and two other crew members of the rowing boat Artemis Investments, Don Lennox and Ray Carroll holds two Guinness World Records, both were sat on their adventurous trip from New York City to the Scilly Isles in the UK in 2010. First they sat the world record for longest distance rowed in 24h in an ocean rowing boat at 118miles When they decided to make the trip, it was in order to try to beat the long-standing North Atlantic speed record set in 1896 by Norwegians Frank Samuelsen and George Harbo which had stood at 55 days 7 hours for some 114 years. Their boat 'Artemis Investments' left New York City on 17 June 2010 and arrived in St Mary's on 31 July 2010 in a time of 43 days 21 hours 26 mins and 48 seconds. Which remains the record to date for the North Atlantic. During their voyage they were capsized twice in storms.

=== Crossing the South Atlantic with Avalon in 2013 ===
Eight men left Puerto de Mogán, Gran Canaria on 17 January 2013 in order to cross the Atlantic Ocean in a rowing boat. Another boat, Titan, left two days before them. The crew of Avalon aimed to reach Port Saint Charles in Barbados in less than 30 days in order to set a new world record. Captain on this trip was Leven Brown, the same man who was captain on Artemis in 2010, when four rowers broke a 114-year-old record. Leven had once before sat a world record on this distance, it was in 2008 with La Mondiale. In 2011 another boat, Sara G., took La Mondiale's record. The crew of Avalon were Leven Brown, Livar Nysted, Tim Spiteri, Calum McNicol, Benno Rawlinson, Peter Fleck, James Cowan, and Jan Øner.

=== Crossing the Indian Ocean with tRio in 2013 ===
In summer 2013, Nysted went on another expedition together with two other men: Maxime Chaya from Lebanon and the British Stuart Kershaw. Their journey started in Perth, Australia on 9 June 2013. They crossed the Indian Ocean by rowing. They arrived at Mauritius on 5 August 2013 after rowing for 57 days, 15 hours and 49 minutes, which was new world record. Livar sat three world records after completing this journey: he and the two others were the first crew of three to cross the Indian Ocean, they were also the fastest rowing crew to row this distance and Livar sat a new world record for having crossed two oceans in a rowing boat within the same year.
