= Ray Carroll (rugby union) =

Irish rugby union player

- Full name: Raymond Carroll
- Born: 9 February 1926 Dublin, Ireland
- Died: 6 February 2015 (aged 88) Blackrock, Dublin, Ireland
- School: Castleknock College

Rugby union career
- Position: Scrum-half
International career
Years	Team	Apps	(Points)
1947–50	Ireland	3	(0)

Raymond Carroll (9 February 1926 — 6 January 2015) was an Irish international rugby union player.

Born in Dublin, Carroll learned his rugby at Castleknock College, which he captained to a Leinster Schools Senior Cup title in 1944. He later captained Lansdowne made his debut for Ireland in the 1947 Five Nations as a scrum-half against France in Dublin, before gaining two further in 1950.

Carroll served as president of the Castleknock College Union and was vice chairman of their Board of Governors.

== See also ==
- List of Ireland national rugby union players
