= Frank Samuelsen and George Harbo =

Norwegian-American ocean rowers

Frank Samuelsen (26 February 1870 – 1946) and George Harbo (14 September 1864 – 1909) were Norwegian-Americans who in 1896 became the first people ever to row across an ocean. Their time record for rowing the North Atlantic Ocean was not broken for 114 years, and then by four rowers instead of two.

== Background ==
=== George Harbo ===
Gottleb Harbo Ragnhildrød was born in Sandar Municipality (present-day Sandefjord Municipality) in Vestfold, Norway, on September 14, 1864. He was the older of the two men and the instigator of the idea to row across the Atlantic Ocean. By 1886 George was settled in the United States with his wife, Anine Brynhildsen. He had been a merchant mariner, a surf fisherman, and a part-time pilot before becoming a clammer in a boat of his own building off the New Jersey Shore with his younger friend Frank Samuelsen.

=== Frank Samuelsen ===
Frank Samuelsen was born Gabriel Samuelsen on February 26, 1870, in a seacoast town of Farsund in Vest-Agder, Norway, and went to sea at age seventeen, spending six years in the merchant marine. Samuelsen was quickly promoted up the ships chain-of-command to bosun's mate. After six years at sea, covering many of the world's oceans, Frank decided to make New York his permanent port. He headed for the fishing villages along the New Jersey coast where his brother lived, and there he met George Harbo. They became friends, and clammed together.

== Voyage ==
The inspiration for their scheme came from Richard Kyle Fox (1846–1922), publisher of National Police Gazette from 1877 until his death in 1922. He had backed previous schemes that today might feature in the Guinness Book of Records. Fox allegedly offered a prize of $10,000 (roughly $300,000 in 2018 money) to the first men to row across the Atlantic, although no contemporary sources exist that confirm this money was ever offered by Fox or the Police Gazette, or that Harbo and Samuelsen were expecting such a substantial sum. Numerous sources report the men were expecting either no money, or only whatever money could be raised from exhibitions following successful completion of the voyage. Sources show Fox and the Police Gazette offered and provided towing of the Fox to Bay Ridge, Brooklyn (which was the last outside propulsion used by Harbo and Samuelsen until reaching Europe); payment of expenses incurred by the American consulate in Le Havre for their food, clothing, and temporary shelter upon reaching the continent; and, of course, publicity of their feat in the Police Gazette. (The Gazette was the only newspaper willing to attach its name to the endeavor as others considered it too risky.)

Using their life savings, Harbo and Samuelsen had an 18-foot ship-lap (clinker-built) oak rowboat built with water-resistant cedar sheathing. It included a couple of watertight flotation compartments, two rowing benches, and rails to help them right it if capsized––a feature that saved their lives in mid-ocean. The boat was carrying American flags, and was named "Fox" in honor of the editor. With a compass, a sextant, a copy of the Nautical Almanac, oilskins and three sets of oars lashed safely in place, they set out from The Battery in New York City on June 6, 1896. They arrived fifty-five days later in the Isles of Scilly off the southwestern tip of the Cornish peninsula of Great Britain.

Richard Fox came to Paris, and at a dinner held in honor of the Atlantic voyagers, handed each rower a gold medal. Samuelsen and Harbo, however, never received any prize money, nor gained any fame and fortune on the lecture circuit. They did get ten Swedish krona from King Oscar II of Sweden for their trouble.

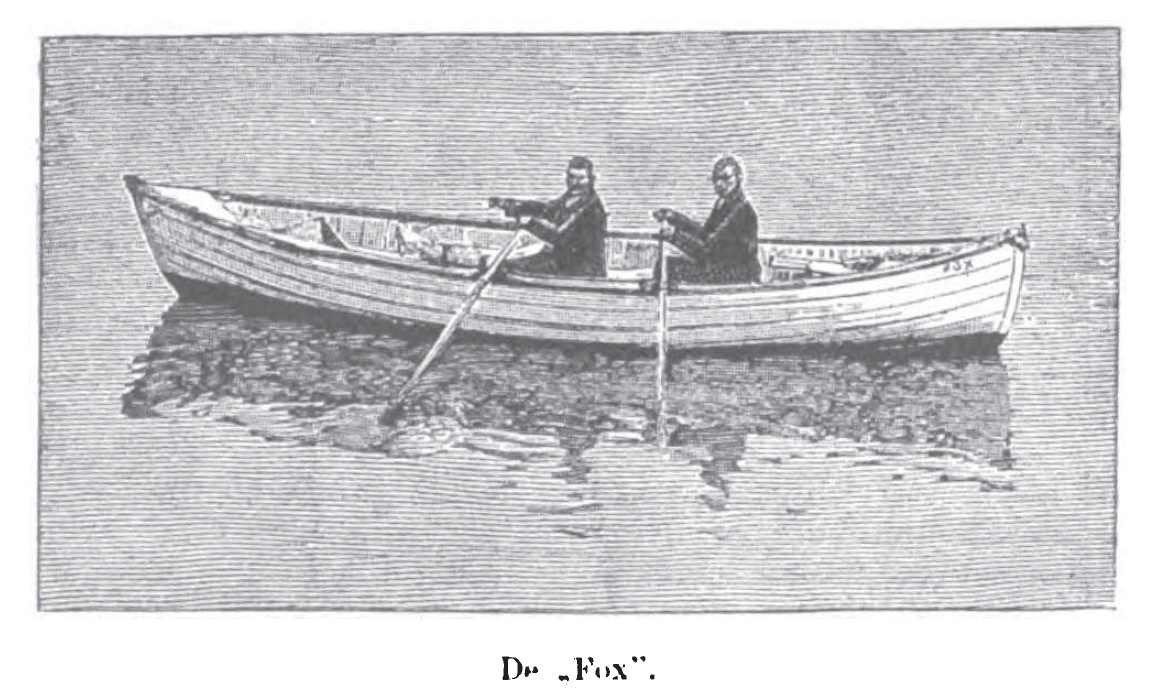
The Fox under way.

The partners loaded their boat on a steamer for the return journey. It was apocryphally reported that the steamer ran out of coal off the coast of Cape Cod; when the Captain ordered all wooden objects aboard broken up and stoked to make steam for the remainder of the trip, Samuelsen and Harbo relaunched the Fox over the side and rowed back to New York. In fact, when the Herald newspaper correspondent met the steamer “at the dock in Hoboken, the boilers were chuffing steam and Harbo, Samuelson, and the Fox were all aboard. The reporter describes the weathered state of their skiff, lashed to the steamer’s deck next to the ship’s pristine white lifeboat, which seemed a giant in comparison.” Though they soon faded into obscurity, their speed record for rowing the North Atlantic was not broken for another 114 years. Single oarsmen have since made the crossing and ocean rowing has developed into a kind of extreme sport.

== Legacy ==
Their logbook and a journal dictated by Harbo survive to document their feat, which was worked into a dramatic account by freelance writer David W. Shaw in 1998. In 1985 folk singer Jerry Bryant wrote The Ballad of Harbo and Samuelsen which has since been recorded by many other artists including William Pint and Felicia Dale. Norwegian folk vocalist Ingvild Koksvik has written and published in 2016 the song Gabriel.

In the summer of 2010, four rowers – skipper Leven Brown (37), Ray Carroll (33), Don Lennox (41) and Livar Nysted (39), on the Artemis Investments – bested the record set by Samuelsen and Harbo by crossing the Atlantic Ocean in 43 days, 21 hours and 26 minutes. But the record for two people rowing across the Atlantic still belongs to Harbo and Samuelsen.

Samuelsen and Harbo's voyage was the subject of a 2016 episode of the Futility Closet Podcast.

== Additional sources ==
- Shaw, David W. (1998) Daring the Sea : The True Story of the First Men to Row Across the Atlantic Ocean (New York City: Citadel Press) ISBN 978-0806525273
- Longyard, William H. (2003) A Speck on the Sea (Chapter 4, International Marine/Ragged Mountain Press) ISBN 978-0071440295
- Anthony, Irvin (1930) Voyagers Unafraid, 'Row Sailor Row, Harbo and Samuelsen' (A. L. Burt Company, New York and Chicago)
