= Roz Savage =

English politician and rower (born 1967)

Roz Savage MBE FRGS MP
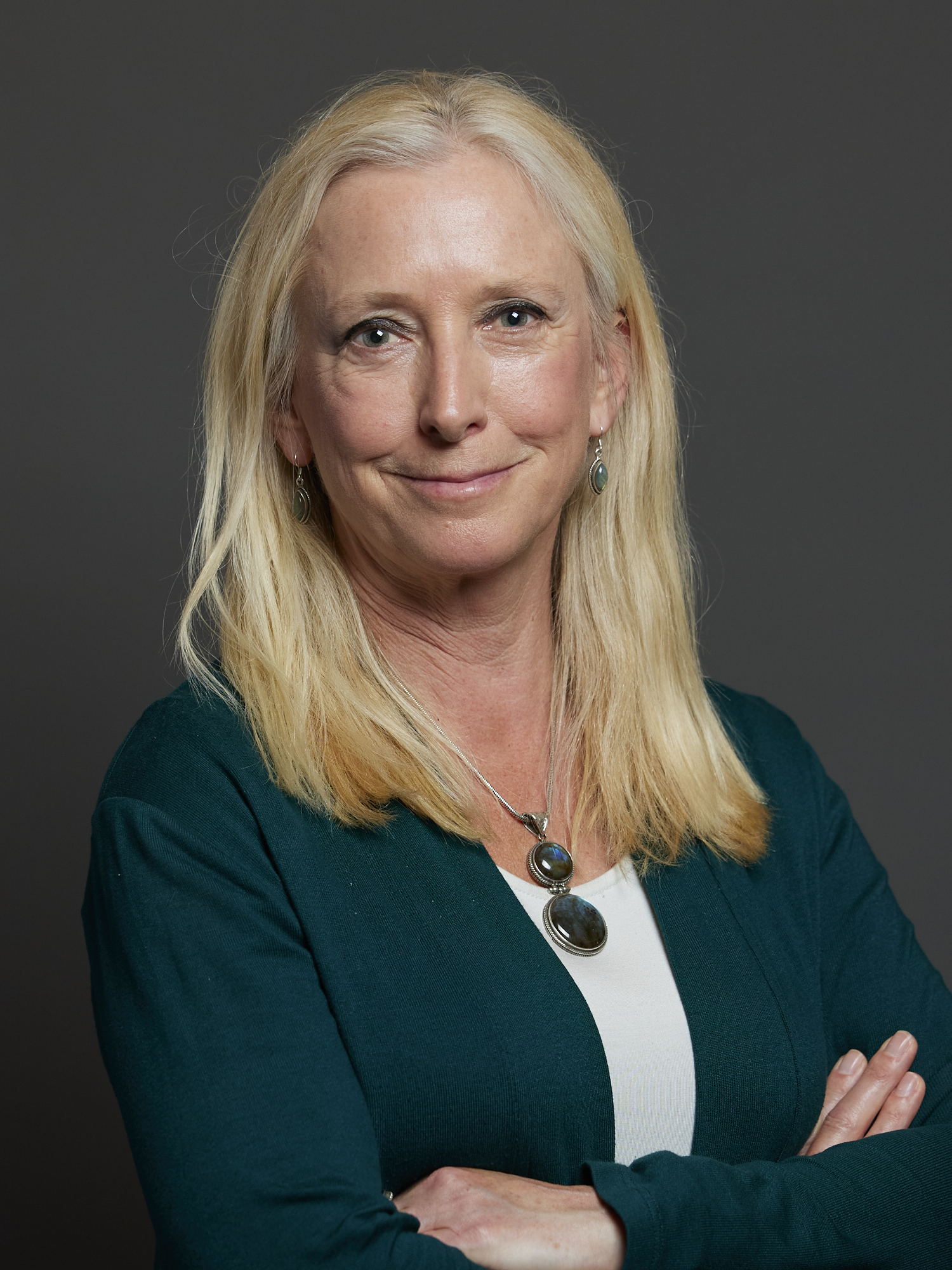
- Official portrait, 2024

Chair of the Liberal Democrats Parliamentary Party
- Incumbent
- Assumed office September 2026
- Leader: Ed Davey
- Preceded by: Steff Aquarone

Member of Parliament for South Cotswolds
- Incumbent
- Assumed office 4 July 2024
- Preceded by: Constituency established
- Majority: 4,973 (9.5%)

Personal details
- Born: Rosalind Elizabeth Adriana Savage; 23 December 1967 (age 58) Northwich, Cheshire, England
- Party: Liberal Democrats
- Education: Perse School for Girls; University College, Oxford (BA); Middlesex University (DProf)
- Occupation: Ocean rower, author, speaker, politician
- Known for: Four Guinness World Records for ocean rowing
- Website: www.rozsavage.com

Rosalind Elizabeth Adriana Savage MBE FRGS (born 23 December 1967), known as Roz Savage, is an English ocean rower, environmental advocate, writer, speaker and politician. She was elected as the Liberal Democrat MP for the new South Cotswolds constituency at the 2024 general election.

She holds four Guinness World Records for ocean rowing, including first woman to row solo across three oceans: the Atlantic, Pacific and Indian. She has rowed over 15,000 miles, taken around 5 million oarstrokes, and spent cumulatively over 500 days of her life (2007–2009) at sea in a 23-foot rowboat.

== Early life and background ==
Savage was born in Northwich, Cheshire, the elder daughter of a Methodist minister and a Methodist deaconess, and was educated at various state schools as her parents moved around the country. At the age of 15 she was awarded a government-assisted place in the sixth form at the Perse School for Girls, which she attended until the age of 17.

She took up rowing at University College, Oxford, and went on to gain two half-blues for representing Oxford University against Cambridge in the 1988 Women's Reserve Boat Race and in the 1989 Women's Lightweight Boat Race.

She has a BA in law from Oxford (1989), and a DProf from Middlesex University (2021), where her thesis topic was The Ocean in a Drop: a narrative of reintegration for an era of disintegration.

By 2000, at age 34, she had spent 11 years as a management consultant. On a train trip that year, however, she sketched obituaries for the life she was living and the one she really wanted. Their disparity spurred her to leave her husband, steady income and big house in the suburbs.

In 2003, she became a Fellow of the Royal Geographical Society and took part in an Anglo-American expedition that discovered Inca ruins in the Andean cloudforests near Machu Picchu, Peru. She then spent an additional three months in Peru, travelling solo and researching her first book, Three Peaks in Peru.

She ran in the New York Marathon in 1998 and the London Marathon in 2001, finishing in the top 2% of women in each, with a time of 3 hours 21 minutes and 53 seconds in the London marathon, 2 minutes more than her personal best.

== Ocean rows ==
=== The Atlantic ===
On 14 March 2006, she finished the Atlantic Rowing Race as the only solo female competitor, taking 103 days to complete the crossing. This she did unsupported, despite breaking all four of her oars and having to row with patched-up oars for more than half the race. Her cooking stove failed after 20 days, then her navigation equipment and music player. She maintained her daily weblog until day 80 when her satellite phone failed, leaving only the movement detected by her positional transponder.

Despite all this, and the danger of having to cut off the rope to her failed sea anchor in 12-foot (3.7 m) waves, she arrived at the finish in Antigua. She is the fifth woman to row solo across the Atlantic from East to West.

Her story was filmed as A Little Silver Boat in a Big Silver Sea as part of the ITV1 documentary television series Is It Worth It?, first broadcast on 12 March 2007 in the UK. Savage's book of her Atlantic voyage Rowing the Atlantic – Lessons Learned on the Open Ocean was published in October 2009 by Simon & Schuster.

=== The Pacific ===
Shortly after her successful Atlantic crossing, she announced her bid to become the first woman to row solo across the Pacific Ocean from the United States to Australia. (Maud Fontenoy rowed solo halfway across the Pacific in 2005, via a different route.) She accomplished her goal in three stages: California to Hawaii in summer 2008, to Tuvalu in 2009, and to Papua New Guinea in 2010.

She began stage one on 12 August 2007 from Crescent City, California, and was rescued 10 days later, approximately 90 miles offshore, by the U.S. Coast Guard when a well-wisher called them out after becoming concerned when she mentioned heavy weather and a head injury in her blog. She was later able to recover her boat "Brocade". She made another attempt on 25 May 2008, launching from Sausalito, California, and arrived in Hawaii on 1 September 2008, becoming the first woman to row solo from California to Hawaii. She completed the crossing from San Francisco to Waikiki in a time of 99 days 8 hours and 55 minutes. The total distance covered was 2,598 nautical miles (4,811 km) and the journey took approximately one million oar strokes. En route to Hawaii, Savage was given an essential resupply of water by the two-man crew of the JUNK raft, also on a journey from California to Hawaii. They were running low on food as their voyage was taking longer than expected, and she was able to donate them some of her surplus.

She began stage two on 24 May 2009, with the intention of arriving at the island nation of Tuvalu, 2,580 miles away. On 28 August, after suffering adverse winds and currents for several days, with food supplies running low and her water-maker broken, Savage realised that she was unlikely to be able to reach Tuvalu and reluctantly changed course for Tarawa. She arrived there on 5 September after 104 days at sea and approximately 1.3 million oar strokes.

Savage began her third and final stage for the Pacific row on 18 April 2010 with the intention of rowing to the eastern shore of Australia. After mid-ocean currents gave her a more westerly course, she again changed her destination and arrived at Papua New Guinea on 8 May 2010. On 3 June she reported by Twitter that she had arrived at Madang, Papua New Guinea after 45 days at sea.

=== The Indian ===
In April 2011, Savage set out to row across the Indian Ocean, launching from Fremantle, Australia. Her route, daily locations and destination were kept secret because of the danger from pirates. She was towed back to Australia a fortnight into the 4,000 mile voyage due to a fault with the boat's desalination machine. Savage completed her Indian Ocean crossing on 4 October 2011, becoming the first woman to solo row the "Big Three", the Atlantic, Pacific and Indian Oceans. The crossing took 154 days.

=== North Atlantic ===
In March 2012, Savage announced that she would row the North Atlantic as part of the Olympic Atlantic Row team with Andrew Morris. The goal was to row from St John's in Canada to the UK, making landfall in Bristol and then rowing through inland waterways to London, arriving in time for the Olympics. This row was postponed indefinitely in May 2012 due to unusually large numbers of icebergs drifting past the coast of Newfoundland, the result of a huge chunk of ice breaking off a glacier in Greenland in 2010; the situation was deemed to represent an unacceptable level of risk to the safety of the rowers.

=== Ocean Rowing race support ===
In 2012, Savage joined Chris Martin and the team at New Ocean Wave as race consultant to the Great Pacific Race from Monterey, California to Honolulu, Hawaii, starting in June 2014.

== Politics ==
Savage stood unsuccessfully in May 2023 for the Liberal Democrats in a by-election for the Painswick and Upton ward of Stroud District Council in Gloucestershire. She was selected in September 2023 as the Liberal Democrat candidate for the new South Cotswolds constituency, which covers parts of Gloucestershire and Wiltshire. She won the seat at the 2024 general election, defeating James Gray (who had been the Conservative MP for North Wiltshire from 1997 to 2024).

After being selected in third place in the private members’ bill ballot on 5 September 2024, Savage chose to advance the Climate and Nature Bill, which had its first reading on 16 October 2024. Its second reading took place on 24 January 2025, but debate was adjourned (after a division in the Commons) until 11 July 2025, and then adjourned again until April 2026, at which point it fell.

On 15 September 2025, she replaced Pippa Heylings on the Environmental Audit Select Committee.

== Other activities ==
Savage is a United Nations Climate Hero, a trained presenter for the Climate Reality Project, and an Athlete Ambassador for 350.org. She is on the board of Adventurers and Scientists for Conservation, and a Blue Ambassador for the UK-based BLUE Project. She promotes plastic-free communities as co-patron of the Greener Upon Thames campaign for a plastic bag free Olympics in 2012, and as a Notable Coalition Member of the Plastic Pollution Coalition. She also supports the work of the 5 Gyres Institute, and is an Ambassador for Plastic Oceans and MacGillivray Freeman's One World One Ocean project. Her voyages take place under the auspices of the Blue Frontier Campaign.

In 2016–2017, she taught a weekly seminar on courage at Yale's Jackson Institute for Global Affairs.

== Honours and awards ==
Savage was appointed MBE (Member of the Order of the British Empire) in the 2013 Birthday Honours for services to environmental awareness and fundraising.

She is a Fellow of the Royal Geographical Society, a Fellow of the Explorers Club of New York, and has been listed amongst the Top Twenty Great British Adventurers by the Daily Telegraph and the Top Ten Ultimate Adventurers by National Geographic. In 2011, she received the Ocean Inspiration Through Adventure award. She was awarded an honorary degree (Doctor of Laws) by Bristol University in 2014.

== Selected publications ==
- Savage, Roz (2022). The Ocean in a Drop: Navigating from Crisis to Consciousness. Flint. ISBN 978-0750999694.
- Savage, Roz (2020). The Gifts of Solitude: A Short Guide to Surviving and Thriving in Isolation. Roz Savage. ISBN 979-8637532049.
- Savage, Roz (2013). Stop Drifting, Start Rowing: One Woman's Search For Happiness And Meaning Alone On The Pacific. Hay House. ISBN 978-1781801185.
- Savage, Roz (2010). Rowing the Atlantic: Lessons Learned on the Open Ocean. Simon & Schuster. ISBN 978-1439153727.

Parliament of the United Kingdom
Preceded by Constituency established	Member of Parliament for South Cotswolds; 2024–present	Incumbent
