= Crossing the ditch =

Crossing the ditch can refer to:

- Crossing the Ditch a successful 2008 attempt to cross the Tasman Sea by kayak
- "Crossing the ditch", colloquially, refers to Trans-Tasman travel and migration between Australia and New Zealand
