= Trans-Tasman =

Adjective used to signify the relationship between Australia and New Zealand

- Interactive map of Trans-Tasman
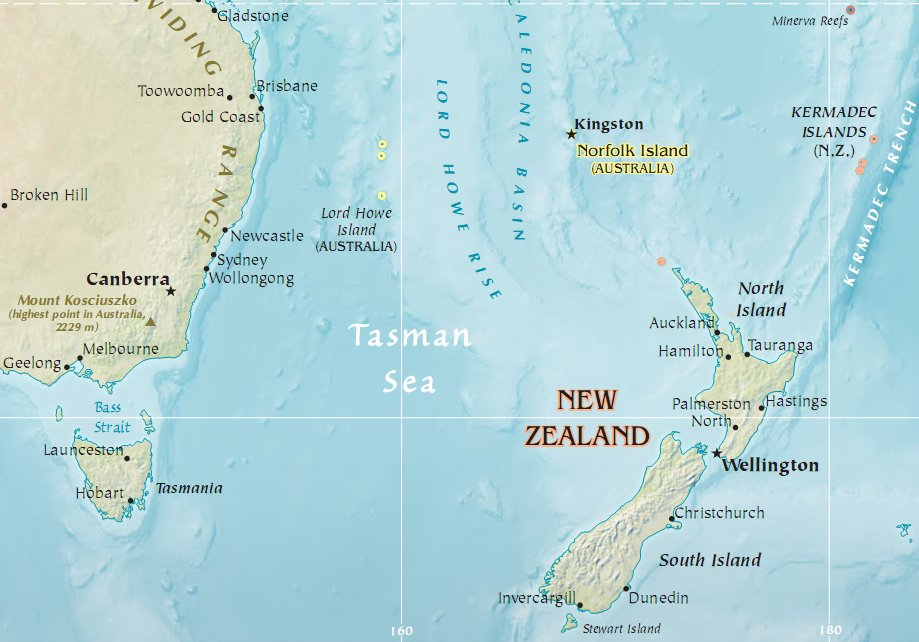
- Trans-Tasman region including South East Australia to the West and New Zealand to the East
- Location: Western Pacific Ocean
- Coordinates: 40°S 160°E
- Basin countries: Australia, New Zealand
- Islands: Lord Howe Island, Norfolk Island, Australia, Tasmania, New Zealand
- Benches: Lord Howe Rise
- Settlements: Newcastle, Sydney, Wollongong, Auckland, Wellington, Hobart, New Plymouth, Whanganui

Trans-Tasman is an adjective used primarily to signify the relationship between Australia and New Zealand. The term refers to the Tasman Sea, which lies between the two countries. For example, trans-Tasman commerce refers to commerce between these two countries.

- A trans-Tasman flight is a flight between Australia and New Zealand.
- The Trans-Tasman Travel Arrangement is an agreement between Australia and New Zealand allowing their citizens free movement between the two countries.
- The Trans-Tasman Trophy is a Test cricket trophy.

== Trans-Tasman events ==
- November–December 1642: In a Dutch expedition captained by Abel Tasman, the Heemskerck and Zeehaen cross the Tasman Sea from Tasmania (Lutruwita, then inhabited by indigenous Tasmanians) to the South Island (Te Waipounamu, Te Waka-a-Māui, inhabited by the Kāti Māmoe and other Māori).
- 18 February 1876: The first trans-Tasman submarine communications cable is completed, allowing telegraph communications between New Zealand and the rest of the world.
- 3 February 1908: first trans-Tasman radio transmission (via HMS Powerful in Tasman Sea).

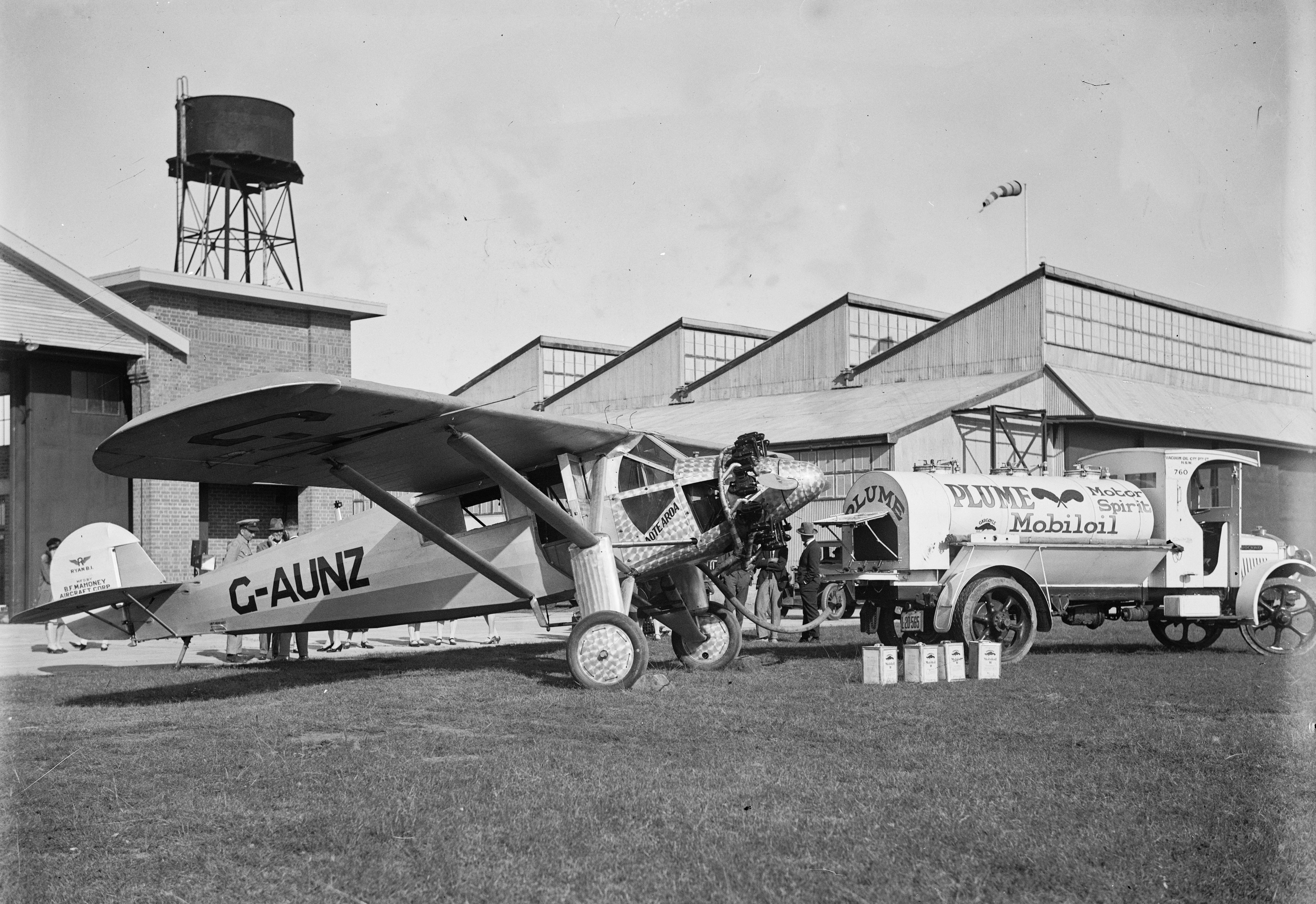
Moncrieff and Hood's Ryan B.1 Aotearoa', Mascot, Sydney, 10 January 1928

Airplane Southern Cross at Mascot Sydney, January 1933

- 10 January 1928: Moncrieff and Hood vanish without trace during the first trans-Tasman flight attempt.
- 10 September 1928: Sir Charles Kingsford Smith and his three-man crew complete the first successful trans-Tasman flight.
- 7 January 1931: Guy Menzies flies the first solo non-stop trans-Tasman flight (from Australia to New Zealand) in 11 hours and 45 minutes, crash-landing on New Zealand's west coast.
- 30 April 1940: Tasman Empire Airways Limited (TEAL) begins commercial trans-Tasman flights between Auckland and Sydney using Short S.30 flying boats.
- 11 April 1965: Qantas begins commercial trans-Tasman jet service, between Christchurch and Sydney using Boeing 707 aircraft.
- 1969: Anders Svedlund attempted a crossing from New Zealand to Australia; however, he was over-turned five days after leaving from Auckland's Manukau Harbour and returned to New Zealand.
- 1977: Colin Quincey, an England-born New Zealander, made the first successful human-powered trans-Tasman crossing. He took 63 days 7 hours to row his Yorkshire Dory row-boat from Hokianga, New Zealand to Marcus Beach on the Sunshine Coast of Australia.
- 24 February 2000: Dick Smith crossed the Tasman Sea in a hot air balloon. The flight was from Kaitaia on the northern tip of New Zealand to Ten Mile Beach in northern New South Wales, Australia. 2167 km were covered in a 55-hour and 12-minute flight.
- 30 December 2007: Four Australians, led by Steven Gates, departed from Hokianga, New Zealand on 29 November. They rowed to and arrived in Sydney Harbour on 30 December at 8:15 am, having taken 31 days to make the crossing.
- 13 January 2008: crossing of the Tasman by kayak completed by Justin Jones and James Castrission; expedition named Crossing the Ditch.
- March 2010: Shaun Quincey completed the solo row from Australia to New Zealand in March 2010. Shaun is the son of Colin Quincey, who completed the reverse journey in 1977.
- July 2018: Scott Donaldson completes the first kayak solo row from Coffs Harbour, Australia to New Plymouth, New Zealand.

== Trans-Tasman relations ==
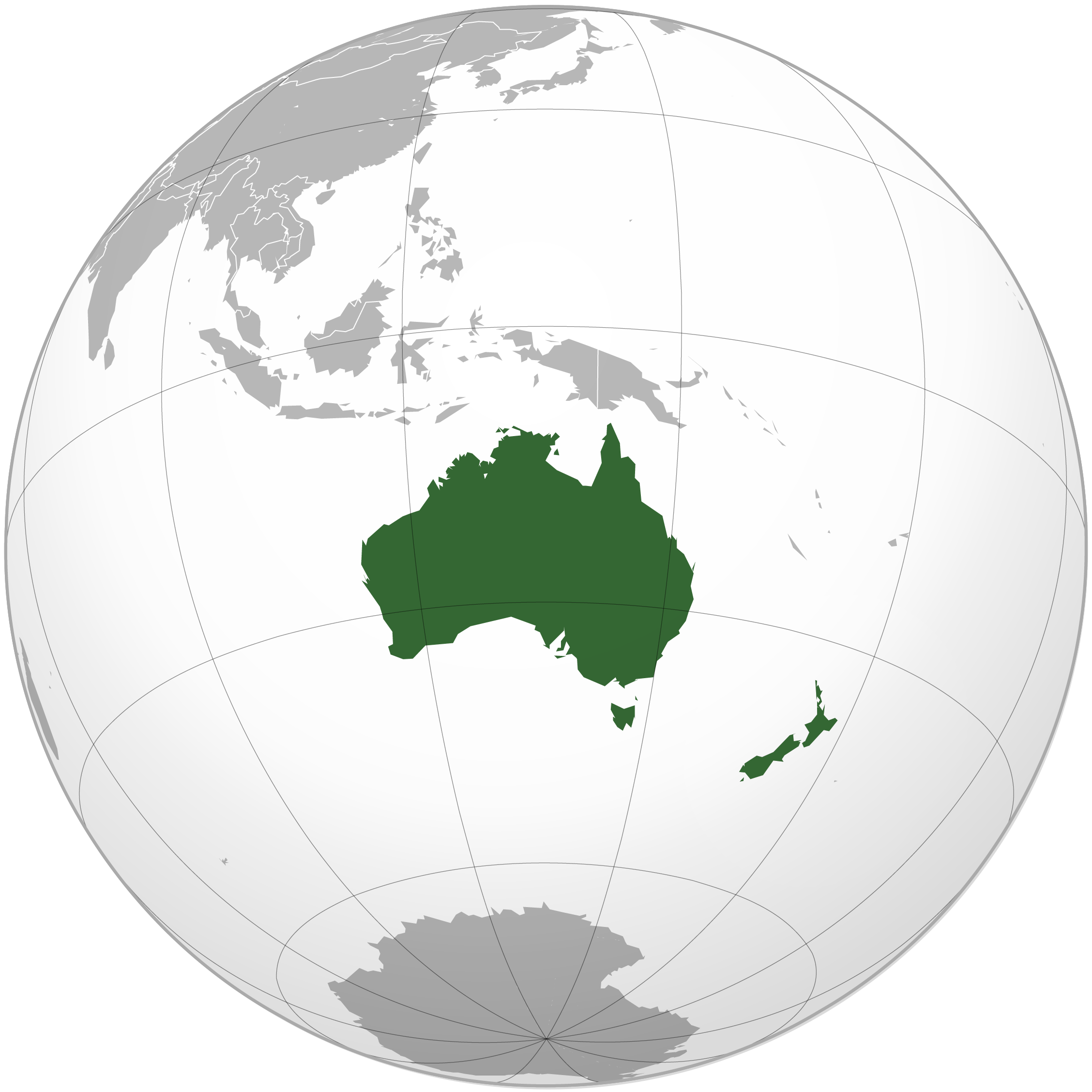
Australia and New Zealand highlighted in green, in the southern hemisphere of the Earth

Trans-Tasman relations refers to the historical, cultural, political, economic, and social relations between countries within the Trans-Tasman region, namely Australia and New Zealand. The two nations share joint histories and similar cultures, such that there are significant numbers of both populations who embody a transnational identity.

=== Union community ===
There is a shift in the largest union communities Australian Council of Trade Unions and New Zealand Federation of Labour towards a global solidarity. This shift can be seen through the cultural recognition of a Trans-Tasman world of work.

=== Arts and culture ===
Cultural relations in the Trans-Tasman support a cooperative relationship with the sharing of art between Australian and New Zealand galleries. However, the two become competitors when seeking to secure international blockbuster exhibitions and audiences.

=== Food standards ===
The harmonization of trans-Tasman food standards led to lower compliance costs for industry, fewer regulatory barriers, and more consumer choice.

=== Economic relations ===
The New Zealand and Australian economies are deeply enmeshed as both nation's economic traffic receive flow from a single economic market. Prime Minister Fraser from Australia and Prime Minister Muldoon from New Zealand committed themselves to a liberalisation of the economy for goods from both countries and proposed tax reductions. Since then, future prime ministers have reflected this trade liberalisation. The Australia-New Zealand Closer Economic Relations Trade Agreement signed in 1983 has been used to guide trade between Australia and New Zealand.

The two nations have an economic power imbalance however, as Australia plays a more important role in the New Zealand economy than New Zealand does for Australia. Australia in comparison will conduct more trade with North and East Asia. As such their bilateral relationship can be uneven and relies on the consulting and weighing of concerns.

=== Memorandum of Understanding 1992 ===
In 1996, Australia and New Zealand agreed to create a single market for air transport that was distinct from the previous agreements which were more restrictive. Some notable changes that affect Trans-Tasman travel include allowing Australia and New Zealand to operate in each other's domestic markets.

This was followed by an endorsement of the open skies agreement under the International Civil Aviation Organization in 2007 which further allowed Australia and New Zealand's international flights to operate in each other's domains beyond to third countries without restriction.

=== Defence and security ===
The two countries defence forces are complementary, and co-operate closely on the international scale, and in maintaining Trans-Tasman security. The equipment is often shared to defend the borders of the nations in the south pacific given the common security purpose of the nations.

== Trans-Tasman crossing ==
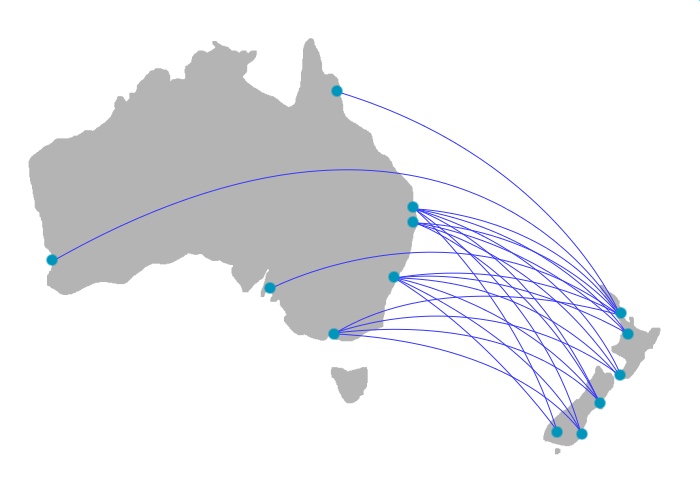
Air New Zealand Trans-Tasman Flight Routes

The modes of transport for crossing the Trans-Tasman Sea include by sea and by flight.

=== By sea ===
The Trans-Tasman crossing can be undertaken by sailing ships, passenger liners and smaller vessels. There are a range of cruise ships including those from companies Princess Cruises, Royal Caribbean Group, Holland America, Silversea and Oceania Cruises. Private vessels are also allowed to cross this Sea.

=== By flight ===
Flights across the Tasman have been made by a range of aircraft including winged aircraft, airships, and balloons. Flight are available with airlines Qantas, Air New Zealand, Jetstar and Virgin Australia.

The aviation market in the Trans-Tasman region has experienced growth since the introduction of low-cost carriers, specifically Jetstar. Low fares are an important factor for the patronage of flights, alongside check in procedures and airport features. Air transport can significantly affect the economy of the Trans-Tasman through its impact on the tourism, logistics and high value-added manufacturing sectors.

== Trans-Tasman migration ==
There has been significant migration between New Zealand and Australia since the 20th century. Economic and social history between the two countries during early colonial time was influenced by the sealing and whaling industry which saw Trans-Tasman migration. In the 21st century the movement is enabled by the Trans-Tasman travel arrangement which governs the regulatory frameworks and supports high international mobility across the Tasman. There has been a cyclical movement between the two countries, but a strong net movement towards Australia since the late 1960s. Many migrants between the countries have reported a sense of transnationalism where they are able to feel at home in both Australia and New Zealand.

This migration is attributable to economic development driven by globalisation, technological change, business cycles, demographic dynamics, and perceptions. Migration specifically from New Zealand to Australia can be attributable to dissatisfaction and desire for change or a sense of newness. However, 15% of people have stated their migration to Australia was because of temporary travel, and then a decision to stay.

However, there are differences in culture, strategic outlook and governance between the nations that contribute to the distinct differences of the two nations and play a role in migration. Evident differences include topography and geography, both of which influence culture, seasonality, and trade. Australia's population size and proximity to Asia contribute to its greater presence in international trade whilst New Zealand's landscape and natural surroundings have contributed to the nation's political and governance decisions.

== Trans-Tasman travel bubble ==
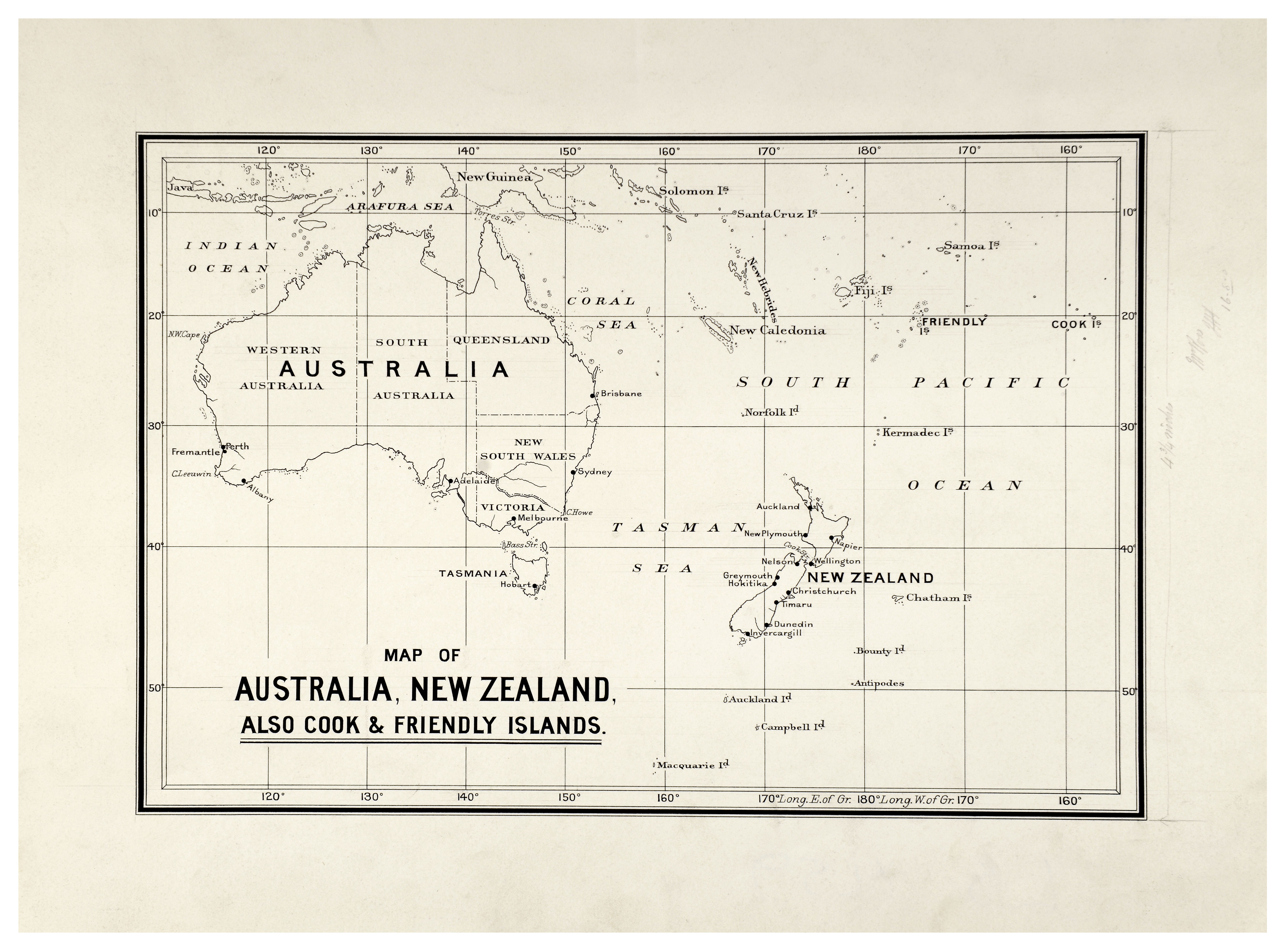
Map of Australia, New Zealand, Cook & Pacific islands

Trans-Tasman bubble refers to the proposed quarantine free travel bubble for the Trans-Tasman region during the COVID-19 pandemic. It is also known as the COVID-safe travel zone. The travel bubble allows entry across the other country's borders. During 2020, there were also plans to extend Australia and NZ's planned COVID-safe travel zone to Pacific island countries to mediate the effects of the pandemic on the economy of the Pacific island countries.

In June 2021, the marine industry has also raised the potential for a sea bubble for superyachts and cruises to travel across the Tasman.

== Trans-Tasman legal proceedings ==
There has been historically a legal connection between the case law of the two countries, both of which come from the Common law tradition. As such the Trans-Tasman Proceedings Act 2010 was created to streamline the process of managing both civil and criminal proceedings with elements spanning across Australia and New Zealand. This act has provisions regarding service of Australian documents in New Zealand, the granting of interim relief for civil proceedings commencing in the other country, the service of subpoenas, remote appearances, and enforcement of judgments in the other country. This Act concerns largely administrative law and governs the procedural practice across these two countries. Problem solving courts within this region are evolving to better capture Trans-Tasman relations.

== Trans-Tasman sports ==
Sports is popular across both Australia and New Zealand, and both countries participate together in a range of sporting competitions. The nations share an interest in sports law and the governing rules of leagues for sports they compete together on, and those which they compete in separately. Legislators across the nations have taken to addressing legal concerns cooperatively and independently. An instance of influence across the Trans-Tasman for sports law is New Zealand's adoption of anti-doping regulations similar to Australia.

=== History ===
Sporting contacts between Australia and New Zealand began shortly before the federation of the Australian colonies in 1901. These contacts embodied a shared sporting culture influenced by Trans-Tasman migration, the induction of Trans-Tasman governing bodies and the sharing of sportsmen for competing in international competitions.

The role of sport has influenced the relationship between the two nations, and history has seen poor sportsmanship have a dampening effect in the Trans-Tasman space. An instance is the 1981 cricket series between Australia and New Zealand where the under-arm bowling incident struck controversy between the nations.

Sport holds a particular importance for New Zealand, and is described by academics as one of their greatest soft powers in the context of politics and diplomatic relations. It has a considerable influence across the Trans-Tasman for its function at the intersection of culture, tourism, economics and health.

=== Sporting competitions ===
Australia-New Zealand Sports rivalries exist across a range of sports, most prominently cricket, rugby league, netball and rugby union. The Bledisloe Cup is a rugby union competition which has particular notoriety for sparking Trans-Tasman rivalry. Other major sporting trophies between the countries include the Trans-Tasman Trophy in test cricket, the Chappell–Hadlee Trophy in One Day International cricket, the ANZAC Test in rugby league and the Constellation Cup in netball. The two nationals also share a strong soccer rivalry and formerly played for the Trans-Tasman Cup.

== See also ==
- Australasia
- Australia–New Zealand relations
- Crossing the Ditch
