= Svedlund =

Svedlund is a surname. Notable people with the surname include:

- Anders Svedlund, Swedish-New Zealand ocean rower
- Doris Svedlund, Swedish film actress
