= Nólsoy =

Nólsoy Nolsø
- Island
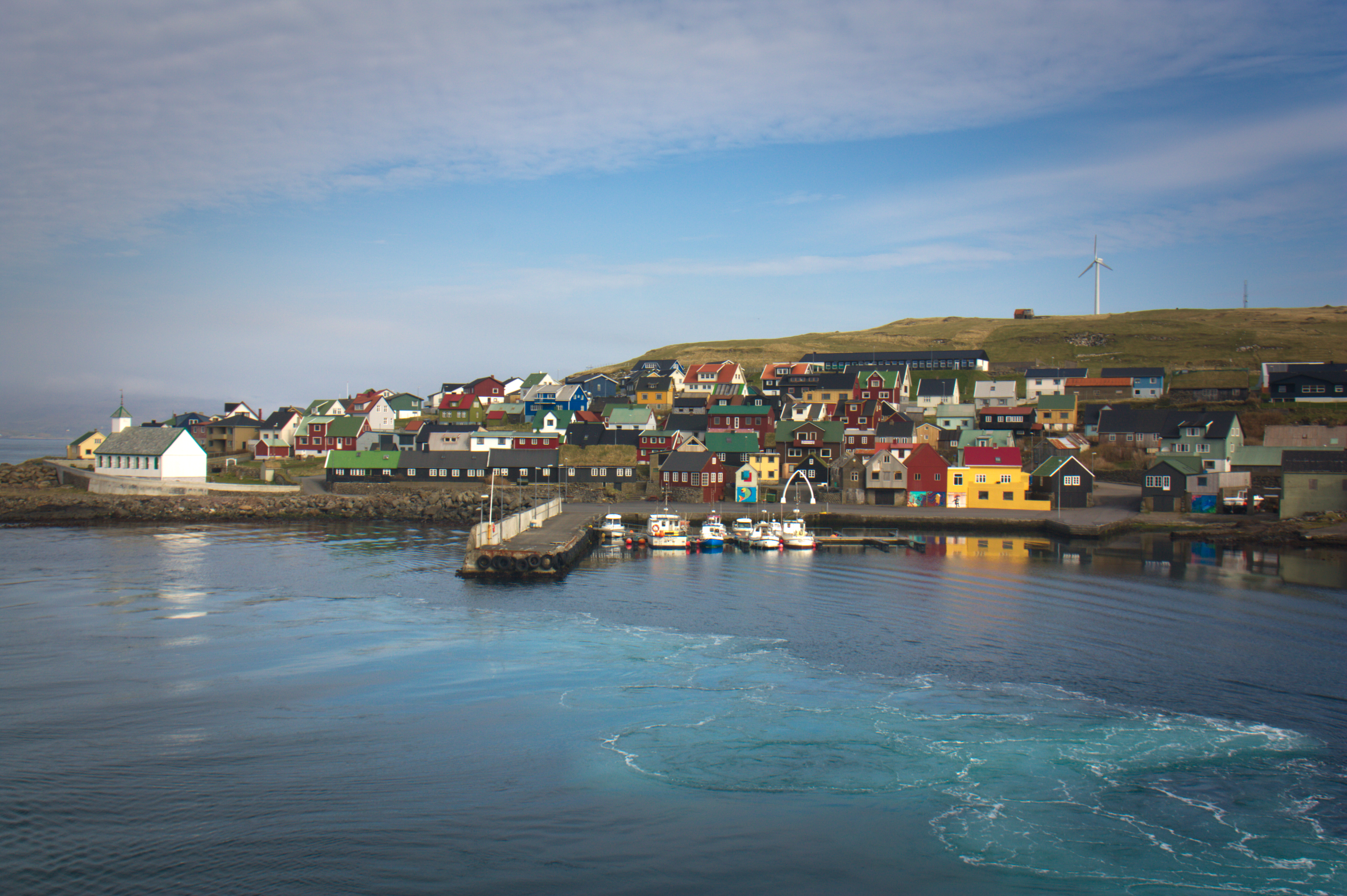

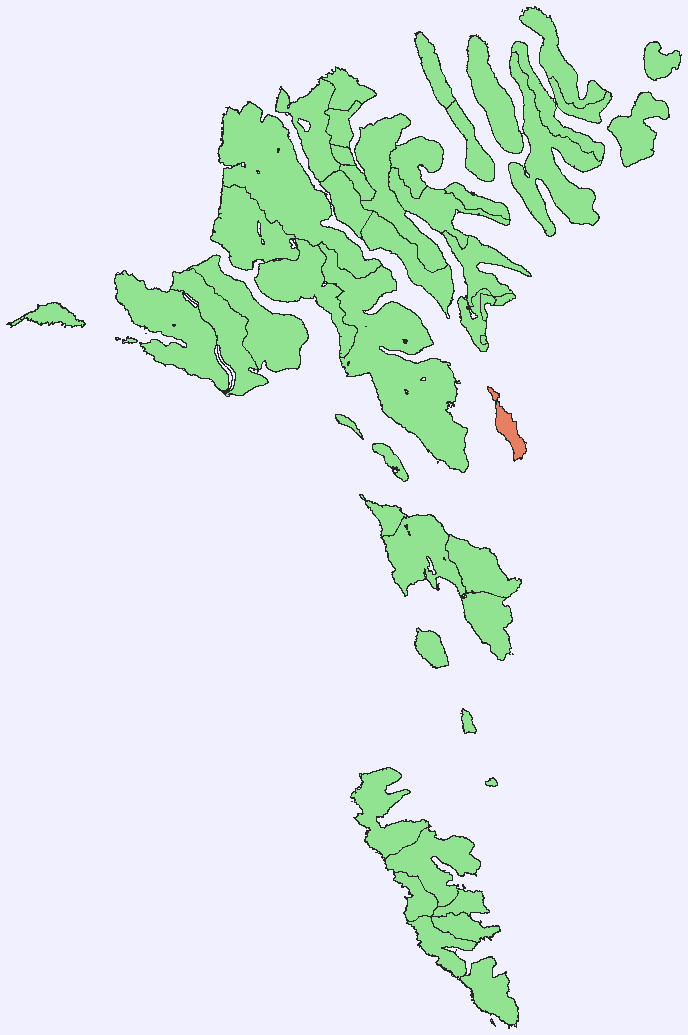
- Location within the Faroe Islands
- Coordinates: 62°00′33″N 6°40′7″W
- State: Kingdom of Denmark
- Constituent country: Faroe Islands
- Municipality seat: Tórshavn Municipality

Area
  - Total: 10.3 km^{2} (4.0 sq mi)
- Highest elevation: 372 m (1,220 ft)

Population (September 2025)
  - Total: 218
  - Density: 21.2/km^{2} (54.8/sq mi)
- Time zone: UTC+0 (GMT)
  - Summer (DST): UTC+1 (EST)
- Postal code: FO-270
- Calling code: 298

Nólsoy (Faroese pronunciation: [ˈnœlsɪ], previously also Nölsoy; Danish: Nolsø; Old Norse: Norsey) is an island and village in central Faroe Islands, 4km east of the capital Tórshavn in Streymoy.

== Description ==
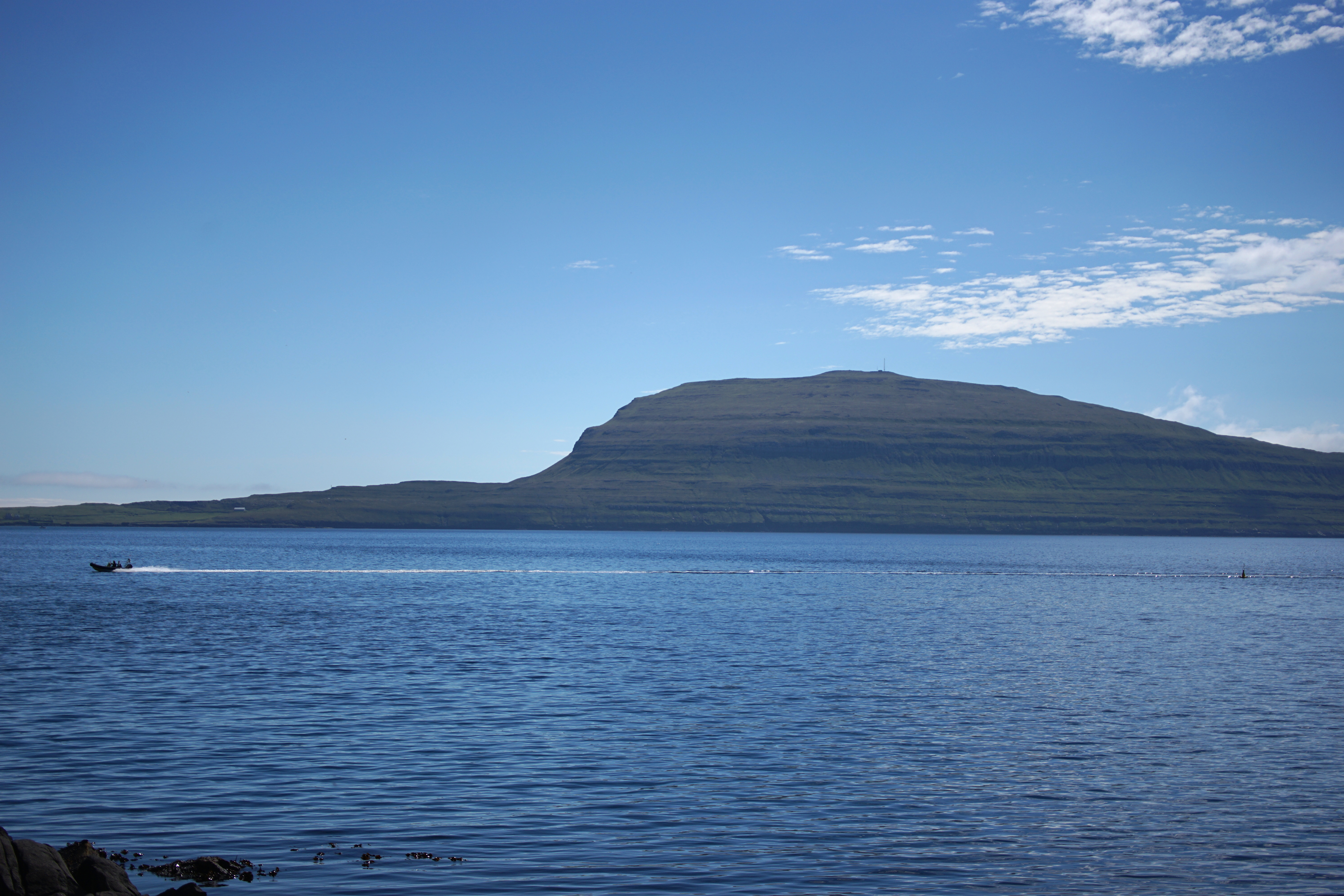
Eggjarklettur hill on Nólsoy, as seen from Tórshavn.

Nólsoy is the lowest of the Faroes; the highest point is Eggjarklettur (372 m) on the mountain Høgoyggj. The southern coast contains two capes, each with a lighthouse (Øknastangi on the south-east, Borðan on the south). The lighthouses were built in the late 18th century to aid smugglers working against the unpopular trading monopoly imposed by Denmark. In 2005, the National Bank of Denmark issued a 20 DKK commemorative coin for the lighthouse.

There is only one settlement on the island, also called Nólsoy, on the north-west coast on the Stongin peninsula which is attached to the rest of the island by a metres-wide isthmus. The small coastal village is made up of colourful homes and buildings, placed extremely close to each other to help shelter each other from storms. The island is accessible by a 20-minute ferry journey from Tórshavn. As many as 40 people that live in Nólsoy go to work in Tórshavn each morning. In recent years many young families have moved from Tórshavn to Nólsoy where the houses are more affordable than in Tórshavn. This way it is possible to live "in the country" and still be only 20 minutes from the capital. Nólsoy is the most populous of the Faroe islands not to have an existing or planned road connection to the rest of the archipelago.

Ruins in Korndalur (Corn Valley) are associated with the legendary Princess of Nólsoy.

== Etymology ==
Old Norse nór (genitive nórs) refers to a narrow stretch of land in a body of water.

== People from Nólsoy ==
Nólsoy has an annual civic festival called Ovastevna, held at the beginning of August. Ovastevna is similar to Ólavsøka in Tórshavn only smaller. Ovastevna is held to commemorate Ove Joensen from Nólsoy. He rowed from the Faroe Islands to Denmark in a traditional Faeroese boat in 1986. In 1987 Ove drowned in Skálafjørður-inlet where he fell overboard. The profit from the festival is used to build a swimming pool for the children in Nólsoy. Ove originally started this project after his row to Denmark.

Nólsoyar Páll came from Nólsoy. He is recognized as a kind of freedom fighter and national hero. He fought to end the Royal Trade Monopoly in the beginning of 19th century. The Royal Trade Monopoly was exhausting and impoverishing the people of the Faroe Islands from 1271 to 1856. Nólsoyar Páll carried trade between Denmark and Faroe Islands in his ship ‘Royndin Frida’. His ship was the first Faeroese ocean-going vessel since the early Middle Ages.

== Climate ==
Climate data for Nólsoy, 80 m.a.s.l.
Month	Jan	Feb	Mar	Apr	May	Jun	Jul	Aug	Sep	Oct	Nov	Dec	Year
Record high °C (°F)	12.1 (53.8)	10.6 (51.1)	10.8 (51.4)	13.3 (55.9)	18.2 (64.8)	18.6 (65.5)	18.0 (64.4)	17.8 (64.0)	17.2 (63.0)	14.0 (57.2)	12.2 (54.0)	11.5 (52.7)	18.6 (65.5)
Mean daily maximum °C (°F)	5.2 (41.4)	5.5 (41.9)	5.8 (42.4)	6.8 (44.2)	8.8 (47.8)	10.6 (51.1)	11.9 (53.4)	12.2 (54.0)	10.6 (51.1)	8.9 (48.0)	6.8 (44.2)	5.9 (42.6)	8.2 (46.8)
Daily mean °C (°F)	3.5 (38.3)	3.8 (38.8)	3.9 (39.0)	4.7 (40.5)	6.7 (44.1)	8.5 (47.3)	9.9 (49.8)	10.2 (50.4)	8.8 (47.8)	7.3 (45.1)	5.0 (41.0)	4.0 (39.2)	6.3 (43.3)
Mean daily minimum °C (°F)	1.2 (34.2)	1.6 (34.9)	1.6 (34.9)	2.5 (36.5)	4.8 (40.6)	6.6 (43.9)	8.2 (46.8)	8.4 (47.1)	6.8 (44.2)	5.2 (41.4)	2.8 (37.0)	1.6 (34.9)	4.3 (39.7)
Record low °C (°F)	−7.6 (18.3)	−6.8 (19.8)	−8.4 (16.9)	−6.6 (20.1)	−2.6 (27.3)	0.4 (32.7)	2.7 (36.9)	2.4 (36.3)	1.0 (33.8)	−4.0 (24.8)	−7.2 (19.0)	−9.2 (15.4)	−9.2 (15.4)
Average precipitation mm (inches)	99 (3.9)	72 (2.8)	92 (3.6)	59 (2.3)	56 (2.2)	54 (2.1)	60 (2.4)	66 (2.6)	107 (4.2)	126 (5.0)	107 (4.2)	109 (4.3)	1,006 (39.6)
Average precipitation days (≥ 1.0 mm)	19	15	18	13	12	11	12	13	18	20	19	20	189
Source: Danish Meteorological Institute

== Wildlife ==
Nólsoy has one of the world's largest colonies of European storm petrels (50,000 pairs). Mountain hares and house mice were introduced by humans, and Nólsoy has its own subspecies of house mouse Mus m. domesticus faroeensis, one of the largest in the world. Nólsoy is also home to the first known wild population of common frogs in the Faroe Islands.

=== Important Bird Area ===
Designations

Ramsar Wetland
- Official name: Nolsoy
- Designated: 31 May 2012
- Reference no.: 2052

The island has been identified as an Important Bird Area by BirdLife International because of its significance as a breeding site for seabirds, especially European storm petrels, Atlantic puffins (30,000 pairs) and black guillemots (100 pairs).

== Nólsoy on Faroese stamps ==
Nólsoy has featured on a number of stamps from Postverk Føroya:

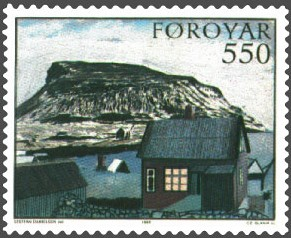
Winter day
Artist: Steffan Danielsen
Issued: 3 June 1985
Engraving: Czeslaw Slania

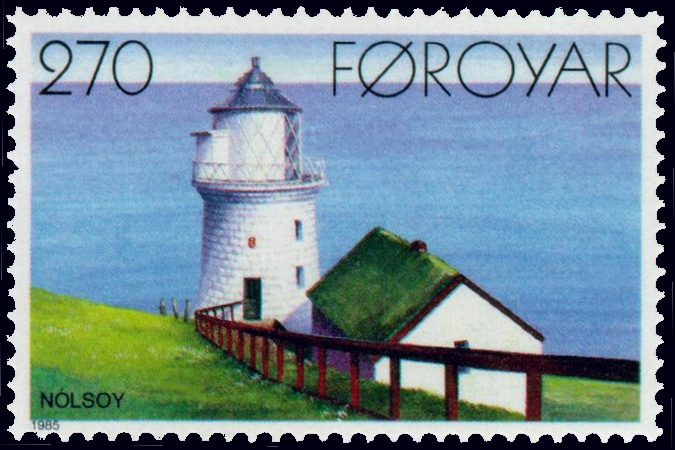
Lighthouse of Borðan, Nólsoy 1893
Issued: 23 Sept 1985

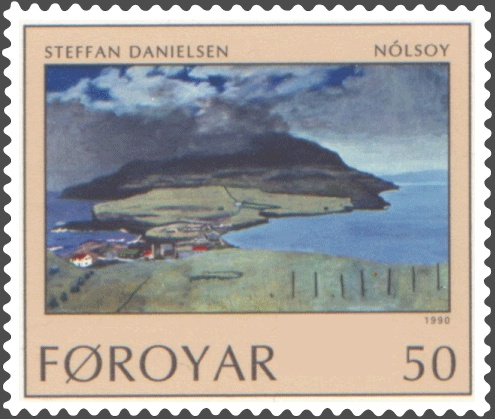
Nólsoy, Faroe Islands
Artist: Steffan Danielsen
Issued: 8 Oct 1990

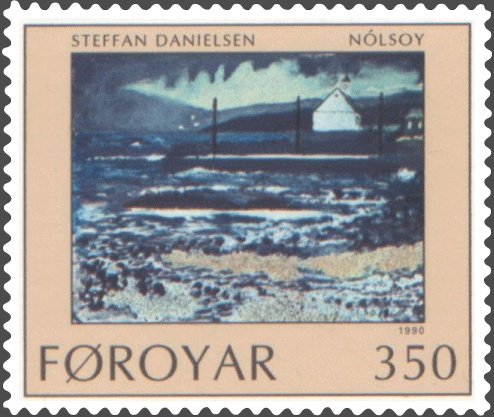
Nólsoy, Faroe Islands
Artist: Steffan Danielsen

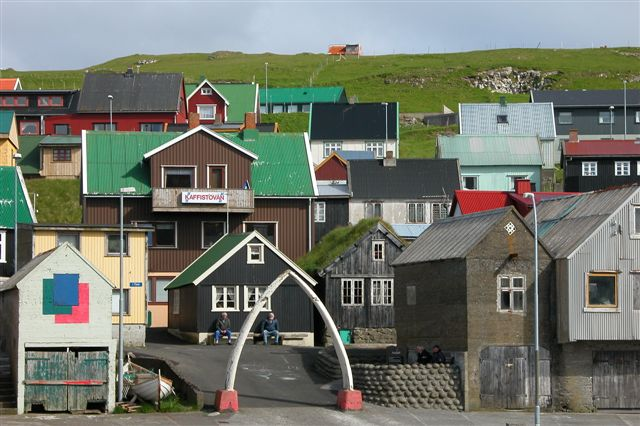
Nólsoy village

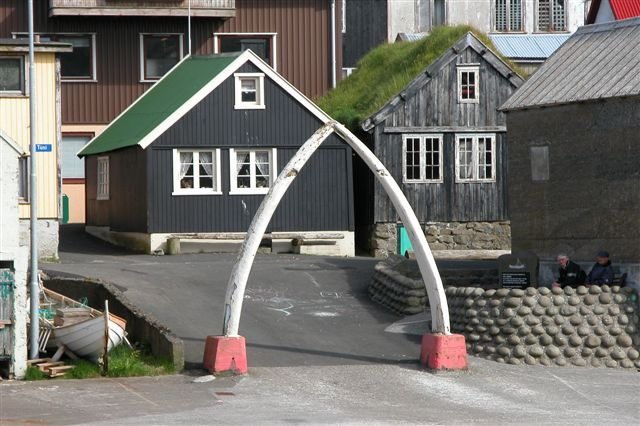
Nólsoy's whale-bone arch

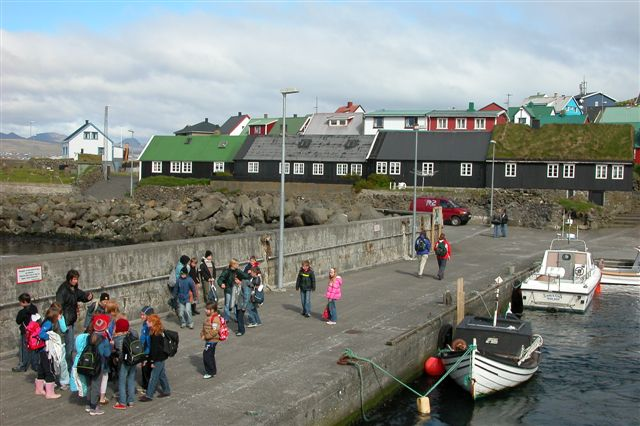
Seafront at Nólsoy

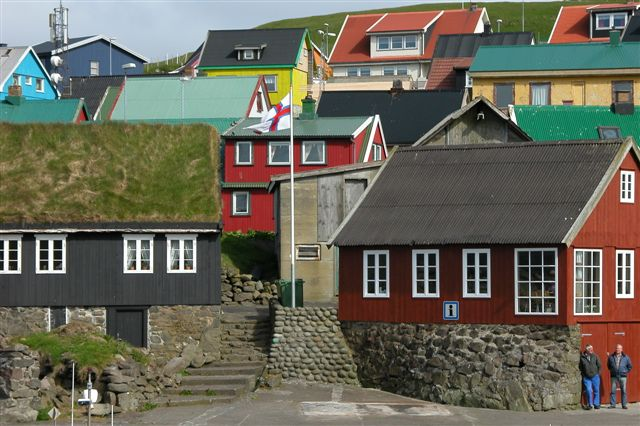
Faroese flag flying in Nólsoy village

== Gallery ==
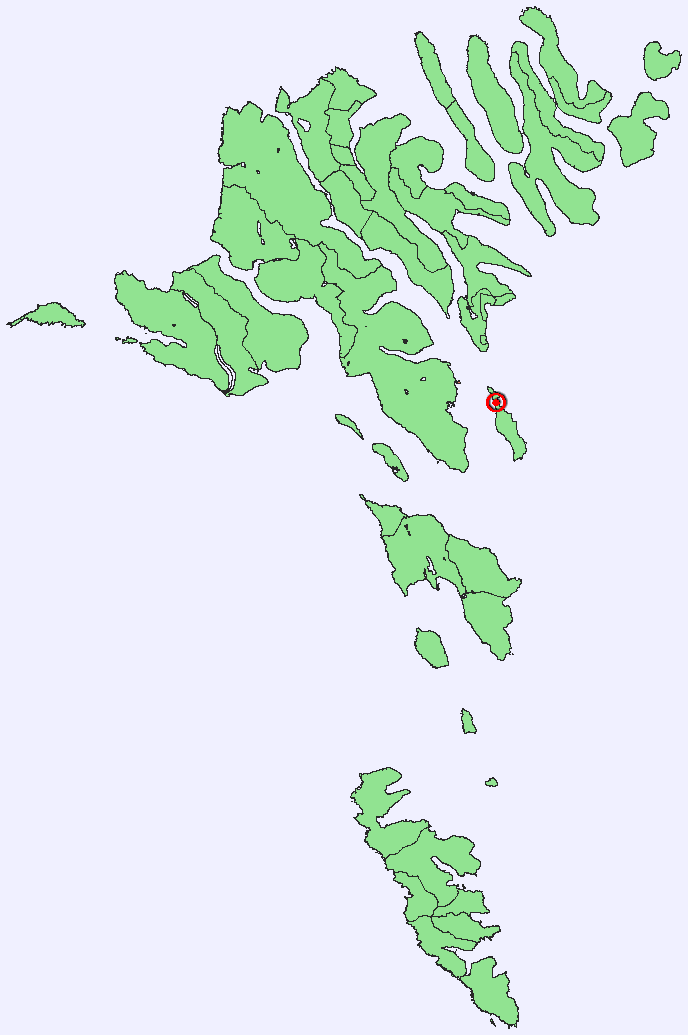
Position of Nólsoy village

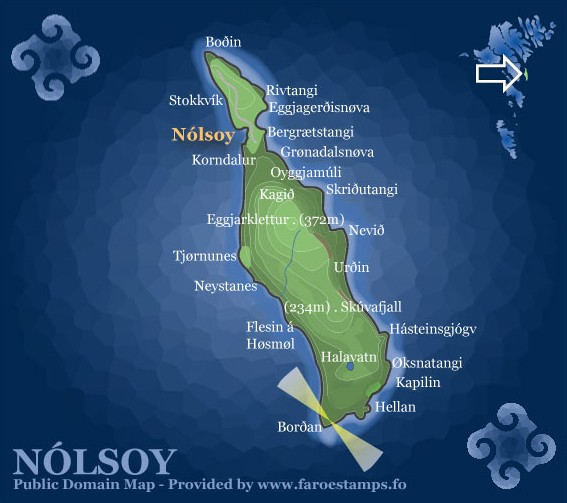
Nólsoy

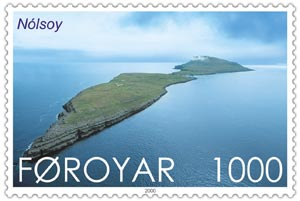
Nólsoy

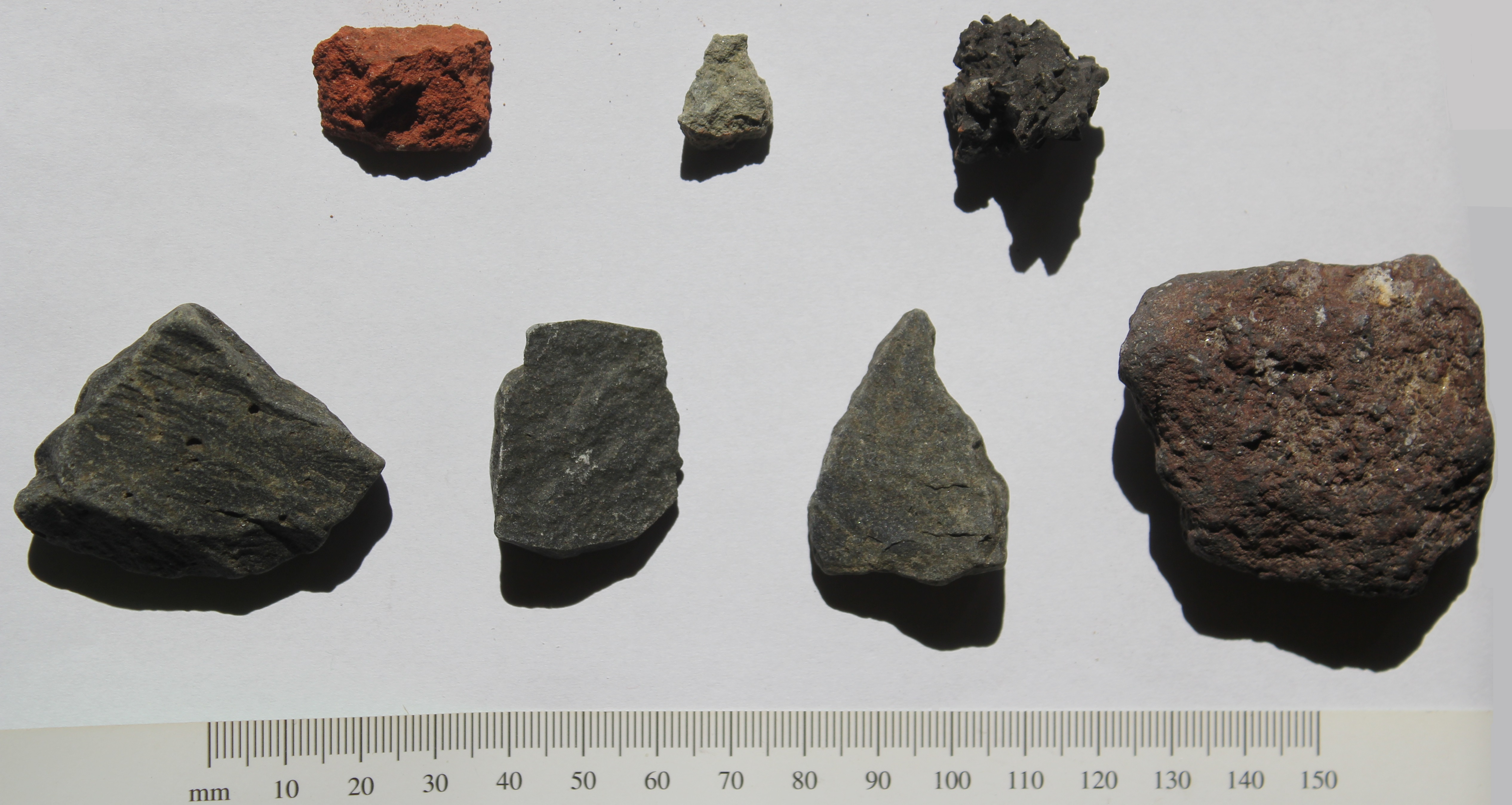
Pumice from Nólsoy
