= Aleksander Gamme =

Norwegian adventurer

- Born: Oslo, Norway
- Notable work: Ekspedisjonsboka (2011)

Aleksander Gamme is a Norwegian adventurer, polar explorer, researcher, author and public speaker.

In 2007, he climbed Mount Everest with Stian Voldmo. While he was there he worked on an interactive teaching project, "Hamar til Topps,” in which 1,000 Norwegian students in 6th and 7th grades participated. He took paper planes constructed by the students to the top of Everest and flew them from the summit. The project received ITU's creative prize.

In 2010, he and Erik Gran Kvaase became the first people to tandem bike across the Sahara. While there, they ran another teaching project as a follow-up to "Hamar til Topps".

In 2011, he completed the first unsupported solo coast to coast hike across Antarctica, going from Hercules Inlet to the South Pole and back again, a trip that took 57 days to the pole and 87 days until he returned to the coast. He finished at the same time as a concurrent expedition by Cas and Jonesy, after waiting 4 days in his tent so he could join them for the final day. Together they were the first unsupported trips to the South Pole and back. During the expedition he gained some media attention for a video of him happily finding some Cheese Doodles in a forgotten cache of food.

== Private life ==
Gamme was married to Cecilie Skog, a Norwegian mountain climber. The two were program leaders in NRK's program Dream Times. Their first of two children, Vilja Skog Gamme, was born in 2014. They divorced in 2019.

== Expeditions ==
- 2003: 50 days through Finnmark and Troms
- 2003: Ismoil Somoni Peak (7495m) (stopped at 7000m)
- 2007: Mount Everest (Tibetan side, with Stian Voldmo)
- 2010: The world's first tandem bike through the Sahara
- 2010: Broad Peak (8047m) (stopped at 7500m)
- 2011/12: First solo unsupported South Pole return hike (87 days, 2270 km)

== Bibliography ==
- Expedition Book, Larsforlaget / Cappelen, 2012.
- 12 tours with trøkk, Larsforlaget, 2012, (Birkebeineren - 800 years after)
- Tough Trips with Trøkk, Larsforlaget, 2010 (On tandem bike through Sahara)
- 10 tours with trøkk, Larsforlaget, 2008 (50 days through Finnmark and Troms)
- Touring with Tricks, Larsforlaget, 2006, (Pik Kommunizma)
