= Ove Joensen =

Faroese seaman and adventurer

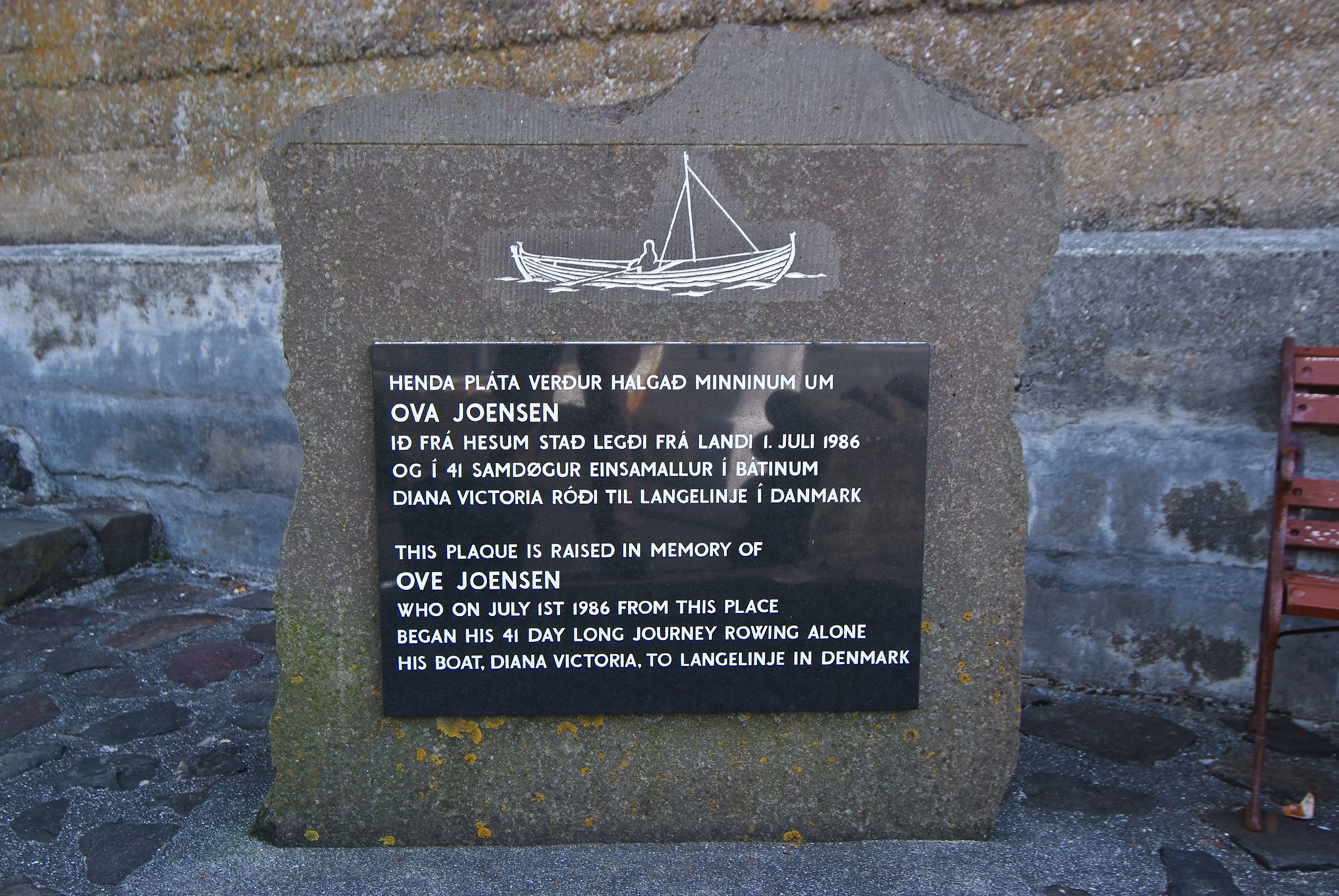
- Memorial to Ove Joensen in Nólsoy
- Born: December 3, 1948; Tórshavn, Faroe Islands
- Died: November 24, 1987 (aged 38); Skálafjørður, Faroe Islands
- Occupations: Seafarer, adventurer, ocean rower
- Known for: First person to row from the Faroe Islands to Denmark

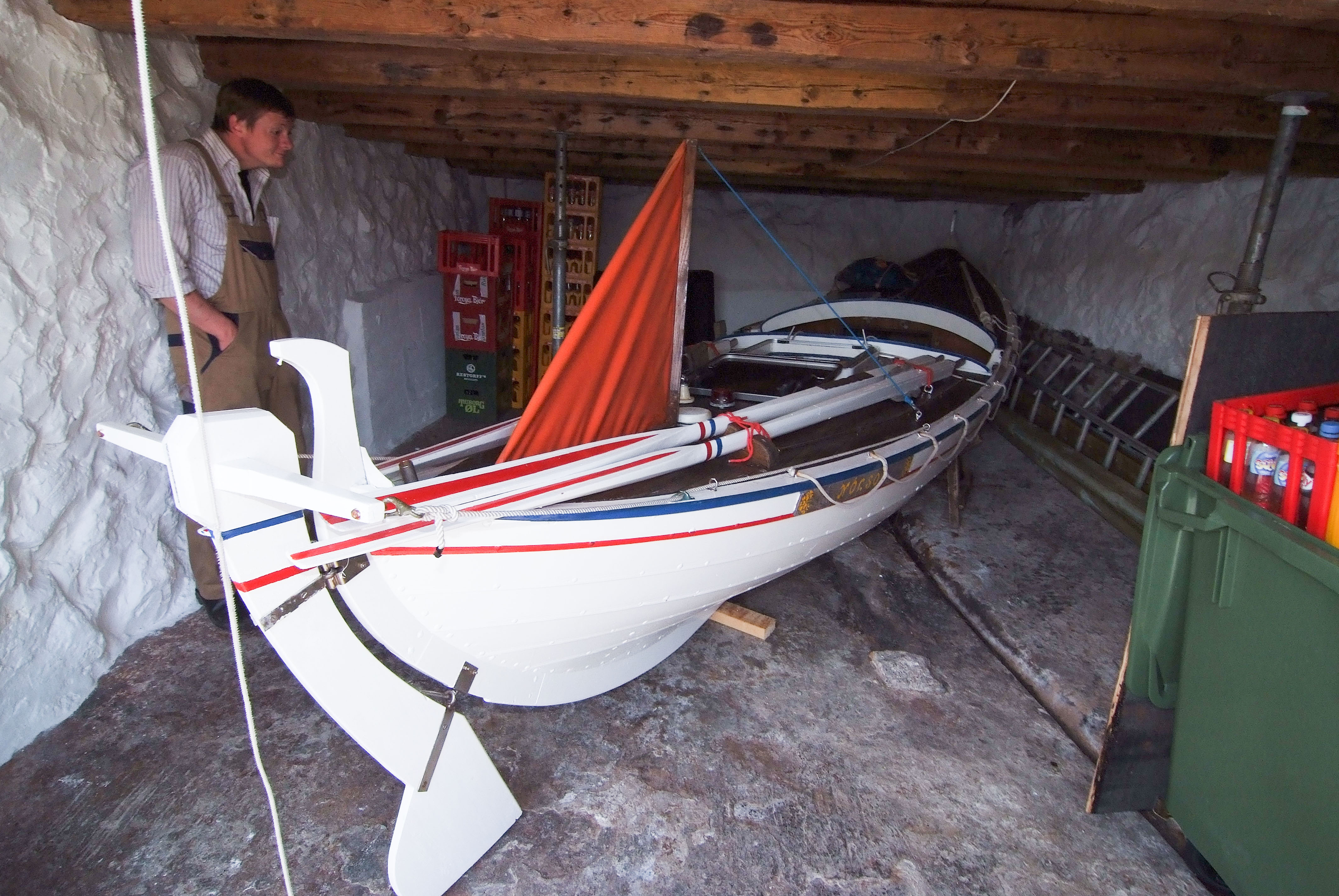
Ove Joensen's boat Diana Victoria in its boathouse in Nólsoy (May 2008).

Ove Joensen (3 December 1948 – 24 November 1987 (Note: November 26th was the date of the recovery of his body, and as is the date shown on his grave marker)) was a Faroese seaman and adventurer, the first to row from the Faroe Islands to Denmark.

== Early life ==
Ove Joensen, born in 1948 in Tórshavn, Faroe Islands, was the son of a fisherman and after moving to the Island of Nólsoy had a seafaring career.

== Ocean crossing ==
In 1984, inspired by Colin Quincey, the first man to row across the Tasman Sea between New Zealand and Australia, he built his 30-foot boat Diana Victoria at Nólsoy, to row the 900 nautical miles (1,700 km) from the Faroes to Copenhagen in Denmark. On his first attempt later that year the boat was damaged when visiting a ship. Diverting to the Shetland Islands, he was towed in from Eshaness by the Aith lifeboat. The following year Joensen's attempt was defeated by adverse winds after he had again reached Aith.

Joensen finally succeeded in 1986, when he arrived in Copenhagen on 11 August 1986 after 41 days rowing alone. Thousands of people greeted him, both in the Danish capital and on his return to Nólsoy. The Danes called him Ro-Ove (Row-Ove).

== Death ==
On the night of 24 November 1987, returning from Runavik, Joensen drowned in Skálafjørður-inlet after falling overboard, though his body was not found until two days later.

The civic festival Ovastevna is held each August on Nólsoy to commemorate Ove Joensen. His boat Diana Victoria is preserved in Nólsoy in the basement of the café and Tourist Information Centre, near the ferry port. There is also a monument to him next to the whale bones that form an ornamental entrance to the village, and another in the village of Aith, Shetland Isles. Joensen is buried in the cemetery of Nólsoy, overlooking the sea.

== Personal life ==
Joenson had 3 children, Christina, Sharlotte Rose, and Bo.

== Literature ==
- Kirstin Didriksen, Ragnhild Joensen: Ove, Egið forlag, 1989 ISBN 87-982956-3-2
