= Nólsoyar Páll =

Faroese national hero

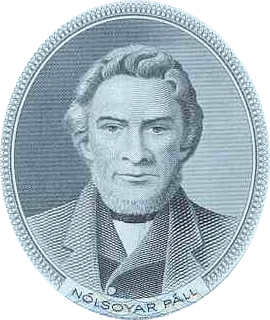
- Nólsoyar Páll portrayed on the old 50 kroner banknote of the Faroe Islands
- Born: 11 October 1766; Nólsoy
- Died: Winter of 1808–09 in the sea near Sumba
- Occupations: Seaman; Trader; Poet
- Spouses: Sigga Maria Tummasdóttir; Maren or Marin Malene Ziska

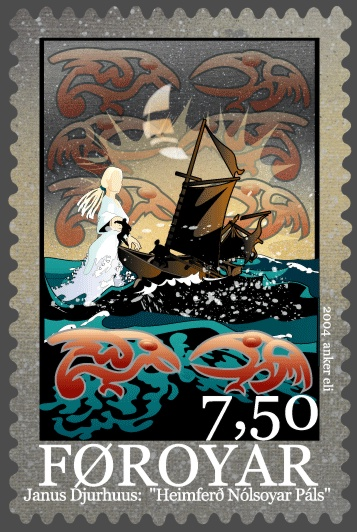
"The Return of Nólsoyar Páll", a Faroese stamp by Anker Eli Petersen

Nólsoyar Páll (originally, Poul Poulsen Nolsøe) (11 October 1766 – 1808 or 1809) is a Faroese national hero. He was a seaman, trader, poet, farmer and boat builder who tried to develop direct trade between the Faroes and the rest of Europe and introduced vaccination to the islands. He went missing in the winter of 1808–1809 sailing home from England.

== Life ==
Poul Poulsen was born in Nólsoy, the fourth of seven children. He and his brothers all took the additional name Nolsøe for the island where they were born. After his father's death in 1786 he fulfilled his ambition of going to sea, and travelled widely; he supposedly served in both the British and the French Navy, captained a US merchant vessel, and also sailed on pirate ships in China. In 1798 he married a woman from his home island, Sigga Maria Tummasdóttir, and was based in Copenhagen for a couple of years, then returned to the Faroes in 1800. His wife died, and in 1801 he remarried to Maren or Marin Malene Ziska, the daughter of a wealthy crown tenant near Klaksvík on Borðoy, and took over another crown tenancy nearby. He was so successful farming there that the Danish Royal Society for the Advancement of Agriculture awarded him a silver medal, although he died before he could receive it.

His innovations in shipbuilding, a longer and more sharply rising keel and a less square sail closer to the lateen, were rapidly adopted. He also designed an improved spinning wheel.

Denied a loan to buy a ship to demonstrate the possibilities of fishing from larger ships, he, his brother-in-law Per Larsen, Jacob Jacobsen and Poul's brothers bought a wrecked ship at auction and rebuilt her at Vágur. Launched on 6 August 1804 and christened Royndin Fríða (The Free Trial), this schooner was the first seagoing ship built in the Faroe Islands, and the first Faroese-owned vessel since the Early Middle Ages.

Since 1805 was a bad year for fishing, he instead took loads of coal from Suðuroy across the Atlantic to Bergen and Copenhagen, trying to open up direct trading, but was prevented from importing goods to the Faroes by the Danish Royal Trade Monopoly authorities. Instead, by vaccinating members of his crew successively using material inherited from the ship's previous crew, he succeeded in bringing the first smallpox vaccine back to the Faroes, and with the help of one of his brothers spread vaccination through the islands. The following year, after again attempting to trade directly, he was convicted and fined on two charges of contravention of the trading laws, but cleared of smuggling goods back to the Faroes, having sold them to a Swedish ship in the Kattegat. He reacted by counter-suing the Tórshavn district sheriff, Joen Christiansen Øre, for large-scale smuggling; the Monopoly officials appear to have been conducting personal trading on the side. However, he seems to have dropped the lawsuit. In 1807, after a year's effort to overcome refusals by the local government in the Faroes and by the Monopoly, he sailed to Copenhagen on Royndin Fríða as one of a deputation of five presenting a popularly supported proposal for a three-year experimental lifting of the trade restrictions. They had to illegally sell 2,600 knitted sweaters and other merchandise to a Norwegian merchant to finance the voyage, but Crown Prince Frederick, who was governing as regent for his father, and others in Copenhagen were sympathetic, and trade would have been opened up if war with the United Kingdom had not begun.

After the battle in 1807, the British Navy began a six-year blockade of Denmark as part of the ongoing Napoleonic wars, cutting off the Monopoly barley trade which had supplied 80% of the Faroes Islanders' grain needs. To stave off famine, Nólsoyar Páll obtained a pass from the British, and brought a load of barley back with him in October 1807. The following summer, after two British ships in succession had plundered the Faroes of all Danish government property, he sailed back to Denmark at the request of the Tórshavn commandant to try to obtain more grain, but Royndin Fríða was seized by a British warship and irreparably damaged. Taken to London, he and his crew obtained the Privy Council's sympathy and a replacement ship, the North Star; in this ship they sailed soon after 17 November 1808 with what was to have been the first of several grain shipments, but were lost at sea, presumably in the heavy storms of November and December that year, near Sumba. The famine was not averted until 1810, when an arrangement was made with the British. The depth of the hatred between Nólsoyar Páll and the Tórshavn commandant is demonstrated by the latter expressing his satisfaction the next April at Páll's having not returned, even though he had asked him to sail for help. This led to suspicion, which still persists, that the commandant had arranged Páll's death, perhaps by commissioning a Norwegian privateer (the Odin) to sink Páll's ship south of the Faroes.

== Poetry ==
Nólsoyar Páll was a talented poet known for satirical ballads. He and his youngest brother Jákup often collaborated on poems; the first mature work which can be unequivocally ascribed to Páll is "Krákuteiti," about the case of a law-man who refused to recognise the baby he had fathered with his housekeeper: he is portrayed as a heron, the housekeeper as a duck, the judge he tried to buy, a cuckoo, and the unwanted child, a red knot. "Jákup á Møn" is about an unlucky suitor, and mocks the parochialism then very prevalent in the islands. "Fruntatáttur" mocks the fashion for women to wear a fringe. "Gorplandskvæði" memorialises the cowardice of the commandant of the Tórshavn garrison, who surrendered without a fight to a British gunboat. A rather rushed work, it has been claimed for another poet, but the tone of the mockery and characteristics such as Nólsoy vocabulary indicate it is by Nólsoyar Páll.

His best known work is "Fuglakvæði" (Ballad of the Birds), a 229-stanza work in which birds of prey symbolise the Danish authorities, and the poet himself warns the smaller birds in the guise of an oystercatcher, which was later chosen to be the national bird of the Faroe Islands. The ballad said in poetic form what could not have been said in plain speech; it sold many copies.

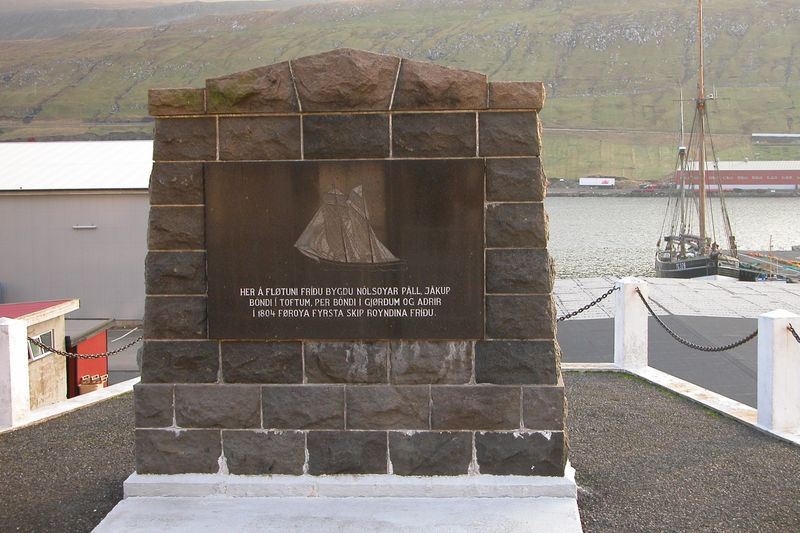
Memorial at Fløtan Fríða in Vágur to the building of Royndin Fríða there by Nólsoyar Páll and others

== Influence ==
Nólsoyar Páll almost succeeded in opening the Faroes to direct trading over half a century early, although most of his inspiration was posthumous. His ideas, Royndin Fríða and the training he provided to Faroese in ocean-going sailing began the development of deep-sea fishing, which later brought the islands prosperity; Klaksvík, where he lived and hauled up for the winter, has become one of the fishing ports. He was an exemplary patriot and has become a national hero. In his poem "Heimferð Nólsoyar Páls" (The Return of Nólsoyar Páll), Janus Djurhuus wrote of his voyage home, drawn by Beinisvørð, symbolising the independent islands.

== In fiction ==
- Johannes Helms. Grib, en Fortælling fra Kulsvierlandet i Kapertiden. Copenhagen: Reitzel, 1893. OCLC 3267610 (in Danish) novel
- Steinbjørn B. Jacobsen. Nólsoyar Páll. Tórshavn: Fannir, 2000. ISBN 99918-49-28-9 (in Faroese) drama

== Sources ==
- Rolf Guttesen: Poul P. Nolsöe - Skúmisleiv og Tjóðarhetja. Forlagið Glyvursnes 496 sider, Tórshavn 2019
- Jakob Jakobsen. Poul Nolsöe, lívssøga og irkingar. 12 parts. Tórshavn: Jakobsen, 1908–12. Repr. ed. Chr. Aigens, 1966. OCLC 729098332 (in Faroese)
- Ernst Krenn. Der Föroyische Dichter Páll Nólsoy und sein Vogellied. Illinois Studies in Languages and Literature vol. 23, no. 4. Urbana: University of Illinois Press, 1939. OCLC 459896944 (in German)
