= Cas and Jonesy =

Australian endurance athletes

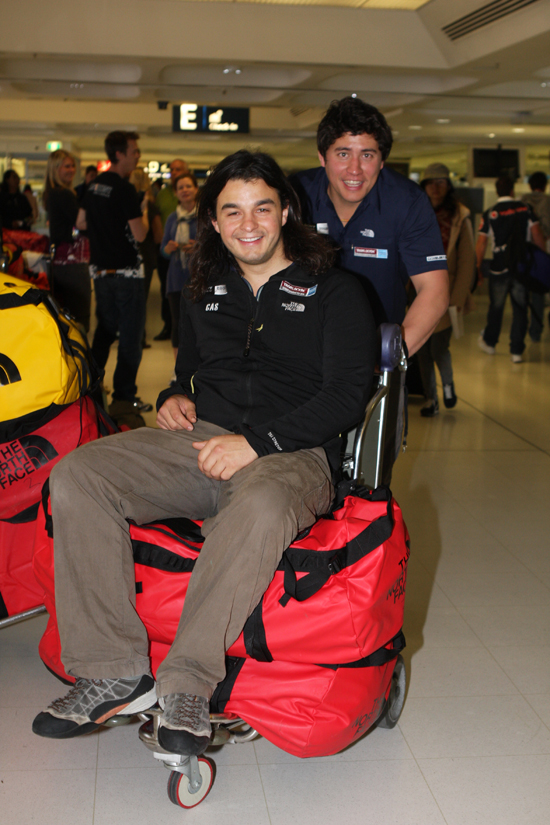
- Born: James John Castrission; 14 March 1982 (age 44); Sydney; Justin Roderick Jones; 20 June 1983 (age 43); Sydney
- Occupations: Adventurers, endurance athletes, motivational speakers, writer and film producer
- Website: https://www.casandjonesy.com.au

Cas and Jonesy are an Australian duo known for being explorers, endurance athletes, motivational speakers, as well as a writer and documentary producer respectively. Their given names are James John Castrission (born 14 March 1982) and Justin Roderick Jones (born 20 June 1983).

In 2008 they kayaked 3,318 kilometres (2,062 mi) across the Tasman Sea from Australia to New Zealand, becoming the first to do so.

On 26 January 2012, Castrission and Jones completed the first unsupported polar expedition from the edge of Antarctica to the South Pole and back without mechanical assistance. After 89 days they made it back to the coast, having skied 2,275 kilometres (1,414 mi) while towing sleds full of supplies. They arrived alongside Aleksander Gamme who had waited for them so they could all finish together.

== Early life ==
Castrission was born in Sydney, the eldest of three children to parents John and Vivienne. Both sets of grandparents migrated to Australia from Greece after WWII. He was educated at Knox Grammar School and then attended The University of Sydney where he undertook a Bachelor of Commerce (Finance & Accounting). He is married to his wife Mia and has a son. They reside in Blackheath, Blue Mountains.

Jones was born 20 June 1983 the youngest of three children to parents Rod and Chintra Jones. He lived in Indonesia until he was 11, before attending boarding school at The Kings School Sydney. He later moved to Knox Grammar School. Jones completed his tertiary education at The University of New South Wales where he studied a Bachelor of Science (Honors Physiology). He currently resides in Tasmania with his wife Lauren and two daughters, Morgan and Dylan.

Castrission and Jones met when they were 15 and 16 respectively. Castrission 's family was Jones's home family in Sydney, assigned to him while he attended boarding school. They became friends, sharing a common love of the outdoors. They participated in cadets together and upon leaving school, they began attempting a number of bushwalks and kayak expeditions together, while working separately in various roles. Castrission worked at Deloitte as an accountant, then management Consultant (2003–2007). Jones worked as a research assistance in a science laboratory (2004– 2007) and various pubs in Sydney.

In 2007, Castrission and Jones decided to work full-time on their plans to kayak across the Tasman Sea. Since then, they have published books, filmed documentaries and given public speaking seminars based on their frequent expeditions.

== Endurance events ==
=== Crossing the Ditch ===
As Cas & Jonesy they became the first people to cross the Tasman Sea from Australia to New Zealand in a kayak. They set off from Forster, New South Wales on 13 November 2007 and arrived at Ngamotu Beach in New Plymouth, New Zealand on 13 January 2008, taking a total of 60 days, 20 hours and 50 minutes for crossing.

Cas and Jonesy travelled in a double kayak named Lot 41, custom designed by Rob Feloy. They transmitted podcasts and photographs during the trip.

=== Crossing the Ice ===
On 26 January 2012, Cas & Jonesy succeeded in skiing from the edge of Antarctica to the South Pole and back without assistance. It took 89 days and 2275 km of skiing, in what was the longest unsupported polar expedition of all time (the pair also finished along with Norwegian adventurer Aleksander Gamme, who had waited for them). Pulling everything they needed on a sled behind them and facing temperatures as low as – 40 C, they endured frostbite, crevasses, equipment failure and food deprivation.

The pair had almost no skiing experience before their expedition and spent months researching and consulting with experts from all over the world. They trained in the Arctic and in New Zealand, acclimatizing themselves to the extreme cold they would experience during the adventure. The Australian adventurers are the youngest team to ever reach the South Pole.

=== Okefenokee Swamp ===
In 2013, Cas and Jonesy completed the world's first on-foot segment crossing of the Okefenokee swamp, the largest blackwater swamp in North America. The pair were filming a pilot for National Geographic titled "Surviving Wild America", in which they retraced a 9-mile trail that had not been used in 40 years. They slept in hammocks above the swamp, travelled in blow up rafts and experienced numerous encounters with alligators, cotton mouth snakes and black bears.

=== Bass Strait ===
The pair completed an unsupported Eastern route crossing in 9 days, travelling 340 km by kayak in 2006. The Bass Strait is the sea strait which separates Tasmania from the Australian mainland.

=== Murray River ===
Cas & Jonesy completed the world's first traverse of the Murray River, Australia's longest river, by kayak. They spent 49 days in 2001 and 2002 travelling a total of 2,560 km, raising $9,500 for the annual fundraiser Kayak for Kids.

== Media ==
Published in January 2010, the book Crossing the Ditch tells the story of Cas and Jonesy's adventure across the Tasman, paddling more than 2000 km kayak from Australia to New Zealand.

Extreme South was written by Castrission following the couple's South Pole excursion and was published in July 2012.

In the documentary Crossing The Ditch (a.k.a. 62 Days at Sea), Jones uses footage recorded during Cas and Jonesy's crossing of the Tasman Sea to tell the story of their kayak journey from Australia to New Zealand. The documentary features interviews from both adventurers.

In his second documentary, Crossing the Ice, Jones uses recorded footage and interviews to tell the story of the pair's journey over 1,140 km to the South Pole and back again, and the quest to become the first humans to achieve the feat unassisted.

== Charities ==
Cas and Jonesy, under the Cultural Gifts Act, donated all the expedition equipment from their two major expeditions to museums in Sydney. In 2010, the Australian National Maritime Museum acquired and showcased equipment from their 'Crossing the Ditch' expedition, and as of 2018 it remains part of the collection.

The Powerhouse Museum accepted the equipment from their 'Crossing the Ice' expedition, and as of 2018 items are on display in the Expeditions section.
