= Johannes Helms =

Danish writer and schoolmaster

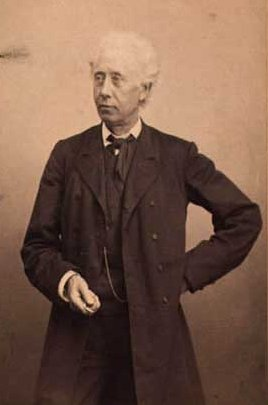
Johannes Helms.

Johannes Helms (8 November 1828 – 4 December 1895) was a Danish writer and schoolmaster who experienced the Three Years' War firsthand.

== Biography ==
Helms was born in the rectory of Sørbymagle County. His father, Søren Bagger Helms (1788–1872), was the local rector and his mother, Nicoline Marie Zeuthen (1789–1870), was her husband's second wife. Four of the couples sons were present in Schleswig-Holstein during the battles in 1864 and subsequently published their experiences.

He graduated from Frederiksborg Gymnasium in 1847 and continued onto Philology at the University of Copenhagen that same year. At the time he was a member of the Studenter Væbningen (a military unit made up of university students and a de facto competitor/substitute for the Copenhagen police). In March 1850 he joined the Danish army partaking in the nationalistic frenzy erupting in those months. He was promoted to Fourer (sergeant) before the Battle of Fredericia and received the Silver Cross for his actions there. He returned to his studies two-and-a-half year later and continued as a member of the Student Guard for the remainder of his student-period.

In 1856, after working as a private teacher, Johannes became teacher at the judiciary school of Slesvig. He had to leave this position due to the War of 1864. In 1867 he was appointed headmaster of Borgerdydsskolen at Christianshavn, a position he held until his death. In 1887 he became honorary doctor at the university and in 1892 he was elected a member of the Copenhagen City Council. In July 1875 he accepted two of the first female students in Denmark: Nielsine Nielsen and Marie Gleerup, who were graduated by Ludvig Trier 9 July 1877. He was succeeded as headmaster by his son-in-law, Peter C.G. Leuning.

== Legacy ==
His song "Jeg elsker de grønne Lunde" ("I love the green meadows") is a well-known staple in Danish song books and was featured in the TV series Matador. The text was translated into Esperanto in the 1920s. Soldaterliv i Krig og Fred ('A Soldier's Life in War and Peace') was reprinted and published in an edited version on the 150-year anniversary of the breakout of the war in 1848.

== Works ==
- Nogle Vers ('Some Verses'), published in 1856.
- Soldaterliv i Krig og Fred ('A Soldier's Life in War and Peace'), published in 1875, is a general recount of his personal story as a soldier in the First Schleswig War.
- "The Childhood and Adolescence of Vestre Borgerdyd School" published in 1884.
- Fortællinger og Digte, Sange og Viser ('Stories and Poems, Songs and Verses') published in 1888, a compilation of his lyrical works and a now-rare Danish account of the events in Slesvig of January and February 1864.
- Grib: a fictionalized account of incidents happening in and around Gribskov in North Zealand during the Napoleonic Wars. Helms' own foreword claims the names as having been altered for anonymity; the story centers around the folkloric figures "Mother Grib" and "Brother Rus" and the attested slavery and piracy in North Zealand in the beginning of the century as well as forging a link to the legendary disappearance of Nólsoyar Páll.

== Literature ==
- Leif Ludwig Albertsen: "Jeg elsker de grønne Lunde" in: Danske Studier, 1968, pp. 120–125.
