= Princess of Nólsoy =

Legendary woman of the Faroe Islands

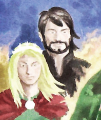
The princess and her husband, portrayed by Janus Guttesen for the 2017 Faroese postage stamp

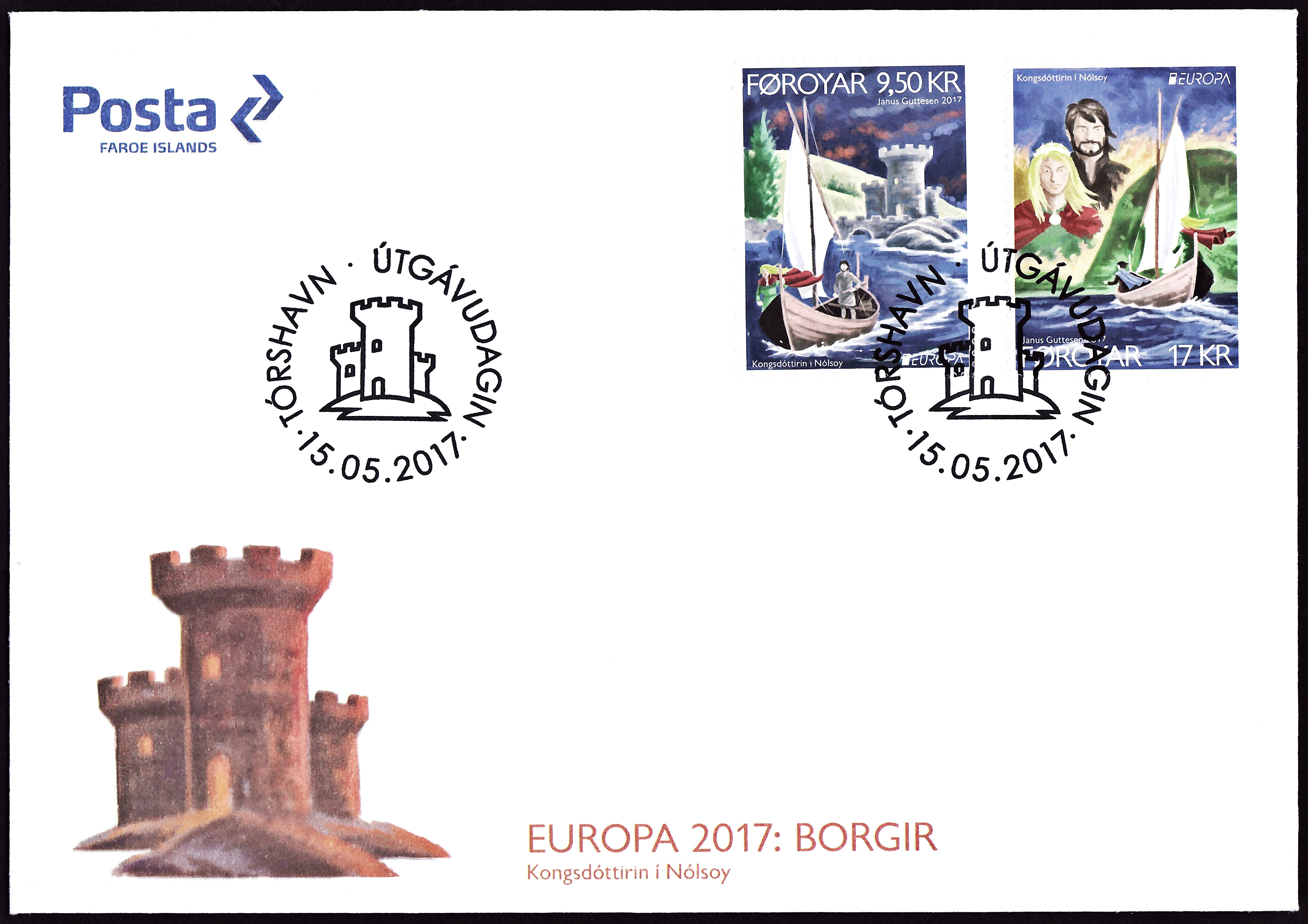
First day cover of the 2017 Faroese stamps celebrating the Princess as an entry in the Europa "Castles" competition

The Princess of Nólsoy is a legendary figure associated with the island of Nólsoy in the Faroe Islands.

A Scottish princess, daughter of one of the several Kings James of Scotland, is said to have fled from Scotland to marry the man she loved, a commoner of whom her royal father disapproved. They settled on Nólsoy, in Corn Valley or Korndalur, at a time when the island had been left uninhabited after the Black Death, and they had a son. The princess's father discovered where his daughter and her husband were living and came intending to kill them, but the first person he saw on the shore was his grandson, whom he recognised, and his heart was softened. In an alternative version of the story, the princess saw the king's fleet arriving, told her husband to hide away, and took the child down to the shore to meet her father. She told him that he must kill her and the child before he would be able to kill her husband. While she was speaking the child laughed and played with his grandfather's gold jewellery, softening his heart. He pardoned his daughter and her husband and invited them to return to Scotland: they refused the offer and lived the rest of their life on Nólsoy, where some inhabitants claim to be their descendants. There are ruins in Korndalur which are known as "The Princess Ruins", believed by some to be the princess's home.

The princess was celebrated in a 2017 issue of postage stamps: the theme for the annual Europa competition was "Castles and palaces", and the Faroe Islands have never had any other resident royalty. One stamp shows the princess and her husband on a ship with an imaginary castle, the other shows the ship and portraits of the couple. The artist was Janus Guttesen.

A book Kongsdottirin i Nolsoy was published in 1996 (ISBN 99918-1-080-3).
