= Colin Quincey =

New Zealand rower (1945–2018)

Colin Quincey MBE
- Quincey, after arriving in Australia
- Born: Colin Quincey; 8 May 1945; Hull, Yorkshire, England
- Died: 8 July 2018 (aged 73); Kawakawa, New Zealand
- Relatives: Shaun Quincey (son)

Colin Quincey MBE (8 May 1945 – 9 July 2018) was the first person to row across the Tasman Sea.

== Early life ==
Quincey was born in Hull, Yorkshire, England, in 1945. As a young man, he travelled frequently, and crewed on the German training ship Gorch Fock. He spent several years in Hawaii teaching English and, in New Zealand, working for the Spirit of Adventure Trust which operated a tall ship, and undertaking house-painting.

== Rowing the Tasman ==
The only previous attempt to row the Tasman had been made by Anders Svedlund in 1969, but he had suffered a capsize five days into the crossing.

In 1976, after becoming dissatisfied with the cadets he was training on the tall ship, and their unwillingness to challenge themselves, Quincey began preparations to row across the Tasman Sea. He designed and built a 6.72 m (22.0 ft) dory-style rowboat, which he named the Tasman Trespasser.

Quincey departed Hokianga Harbour on 7 February 1977, and was escorted past the harbour bar by a helicopter and three crayfishing boats. He arrived at Marcus Beach, Queensland in the dark on 10 April 1977. The voyage took 63 days, with Quincey being down to his last day of rations. The crossing included an encounter with an orca that came within 6 m (20 ft) of his boat. Otherwise, Quincey later described the row as being "a grind of 'eat, sleep, row'".

A first-person account of the preparation and crossing was published as Tasman Trespasser in late 1977. Quincey was appointed a Member of the Order of the British Empire in the 1978 New Year Honours, for "displaying a remarkable feat of endurance by becoming the first person to row the Tasman Sea single-handed from New Zealand to Australia".

== Later life ==
Quincey joined the Royal New Zealand Navy, where he had the rank of commander. His duties included running survival courses. After leaving the Navy, he spent time in Pacific Island and Asian countries working with disadvantaged children. In retirement, Quincey lived in Paihia in the Bay of Islands. A life-long smoker, he died of lung cancer in Kawakawa Hospital.

Quincey married three times, and had three sons. In 2010, his son Shaun made the first solo row from Australia to New Zealand, in a dory called the Tasman Trespasser II.

== Publications ==
=== Non-fiction ===
- — (1977). Tasman Trespasser: Rowing alone for 63 days across one of the world's most treachorous seas. Auckland, NZ: Hodder and Stoughton. ISBN 0340227575.

== See also ==
- Anders Svedlund – first rower to attempt a Tasman crossing
- Crossing the Ditch – first kayak crossing of the Tasman
- Ove Joensen – a Farorese oceanic rower, who was inspired by Colin Quincey
