= Crossing the Ditch =

2007-8 kayaking expedition

Route of the trans-Tasman kayak crossing

Thirty years after the first person rowed solo across the Tasman Sea in 1977, Crossing the Ditch was the effort of Justin Jones and James Castrission, known as Cas and Jonesy, to become the first to cross the sea and travel from Australia to New Zealand by sea kayak. Setting off from Forster, New South Wales, on 13 November 2007 in their custom-designed kayak Lot 41, the two-man expedition succeeded after previous attempts, including the fatal journey of Andrew McAuley, had been unsuccessful. They arrived at Ngamotu Beach, in New Plymouth, New Zealand on 13 January 2008.

The expedition holds the world record for "the longest trans-oceanic expedition in a double kayak by two expeditioners". A significant aspect of this undertaking was the use of the internet to allow the public to track the progress of Lot 41 in real time, and message the crew. Photographs and podcasts from the crew were made available just hours after they had been transmitted from the craft.

== Team ==
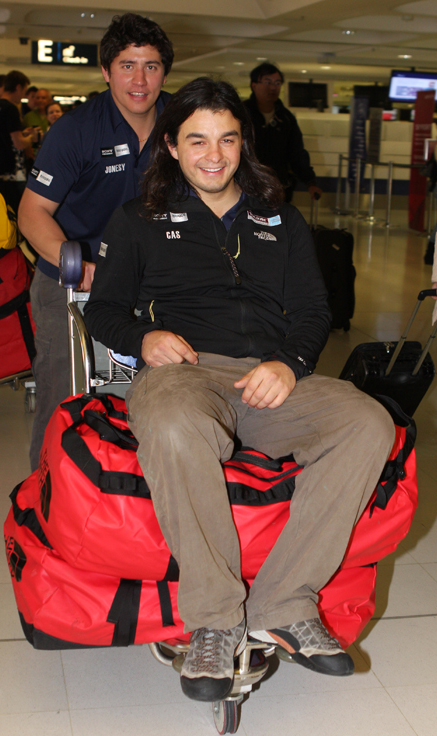
Jones and Castrission in October 2011

The crew of Lot 41 were James Castrission and Justin Jones, two Australians from Sydney, New South Wales. They attended school at Knox Grammar School together and later kayaked across Bass Strait, as well as being the first to paddle the length of the Murray River, a distance of 2,560 kilometres (1,590 mi).

In addition to the crew of the kayak, many others, both in Australia and New Zealand, helped in the preparation for the voyage as well as providing constant support from land.

== Design and construction of Lot 41 ==
The kayak Lot 41 was designed for the trans-Tasman crossing by Rob Feloy, who had designed the kayak for Peter Bray's trans-Atlantic Crossing approximately six years earlier. The Lot 41 design includes two cockpits, a cabin at the stern of the craft, a large water tank and storage for over 60 days of food for the two kayakers. An array of solar panels was incorporated into the design in order to charge the batteries used to power communication systems, bilge pumps and a water desalination unit. The fibreglass kayak was built in Australia in 2005, and was fitted with support systems including emergency beacons, satellite phone, global tracking system, and GPS.

== Journey ==
Cas and Jonesy departed Forster, Australia at 1:30 pm AEST on 13 November 2007. By 2 December, they had reached the vector halfway point, 1,039.5 kilometres (645.9 mi; 561.3 nmi) from Forster and 1,058.24 kilometres (657.56 mi; 571.40 nmi) from Auckland. Their distance over land, which measures the actual path travelled by the kayak and not a straight line, was 1,372 kilometres (853 mi; 741 nmi).

One of the difficulties faced by Lot 41 were strong headwinds. These winds on their own would have made the crossing more difficult, however the design of the cabin at the stern of the kayak compounded the issue. When the winds blew from behind, the cabin presented a smooth, aerodynamic shape which reduced the tailwind advantage. In contrast, headwinds met a nearly vertical cabin entrance, which acted as a large sail fighting against the paddlers.

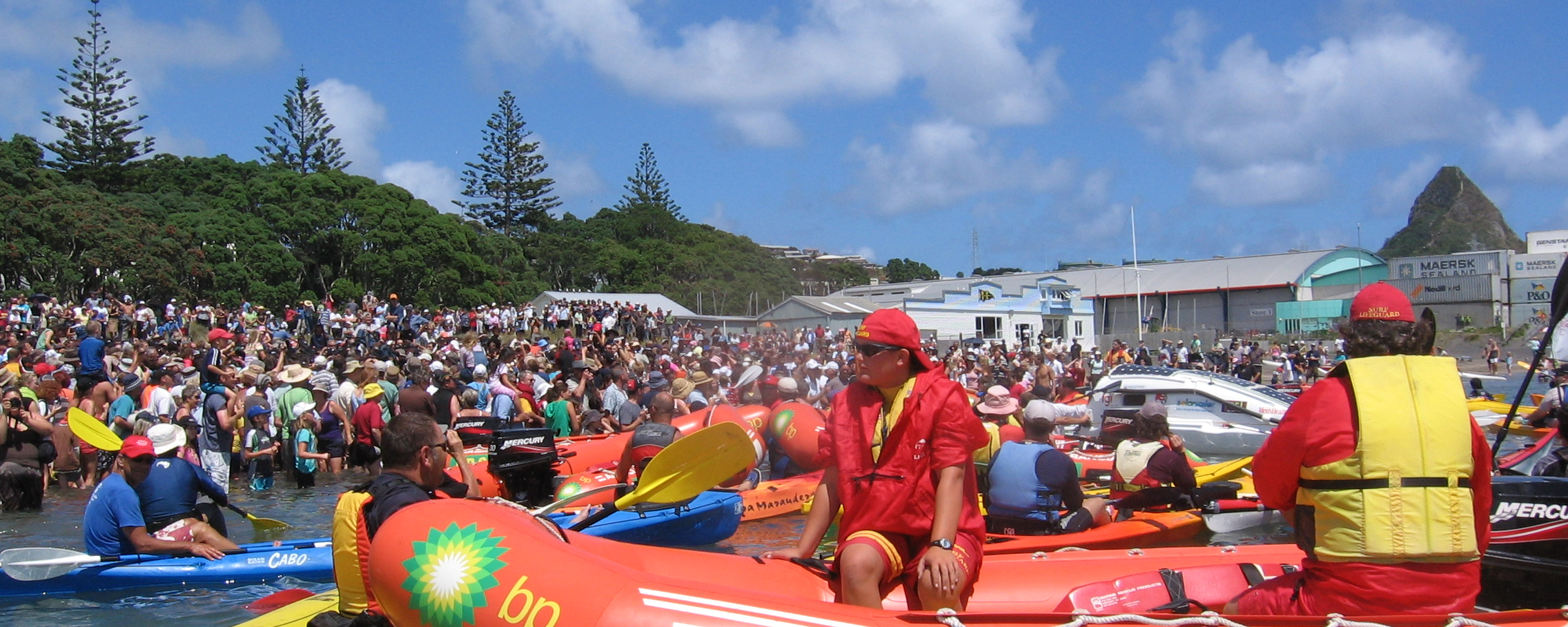
Lot 41 and the "Tasman Rats" arrive in New Plymouth Harbour, New Zealand

The initial plans for the crossing had Lot 41 making port at Auckland. Conditions encountered during the crossing, including strong winds and currents, saw them travel in circles for some time and added almost 1,200 kilometres (750 mi; 650 nmi) to their journey. As they approached the New Zealand coastline, the decision was made to head to New Plymouth instead.

Cas and Jonesy paddled into New Plymouth harbour on 13 January 2008, landing on Ngamotu Beach at 12:20 pm NZST. The crossing took 60 days, 20 hours and 50 minutes.

Lot 41, along with a collection of associated artifacts, was later donated by the adventurers to the Australian National Maritime Museum.

== History of the names ==
=== The Ditch ===
The Tasman Sea has for many years been referred to as "The Ditch" by Australians and New Zealanders. The exact etymology for this term is uncertain, however when traveling between Australia and New Zealand, it is commonly referred to as "crossing the ditch".

=== Lot 41 ===
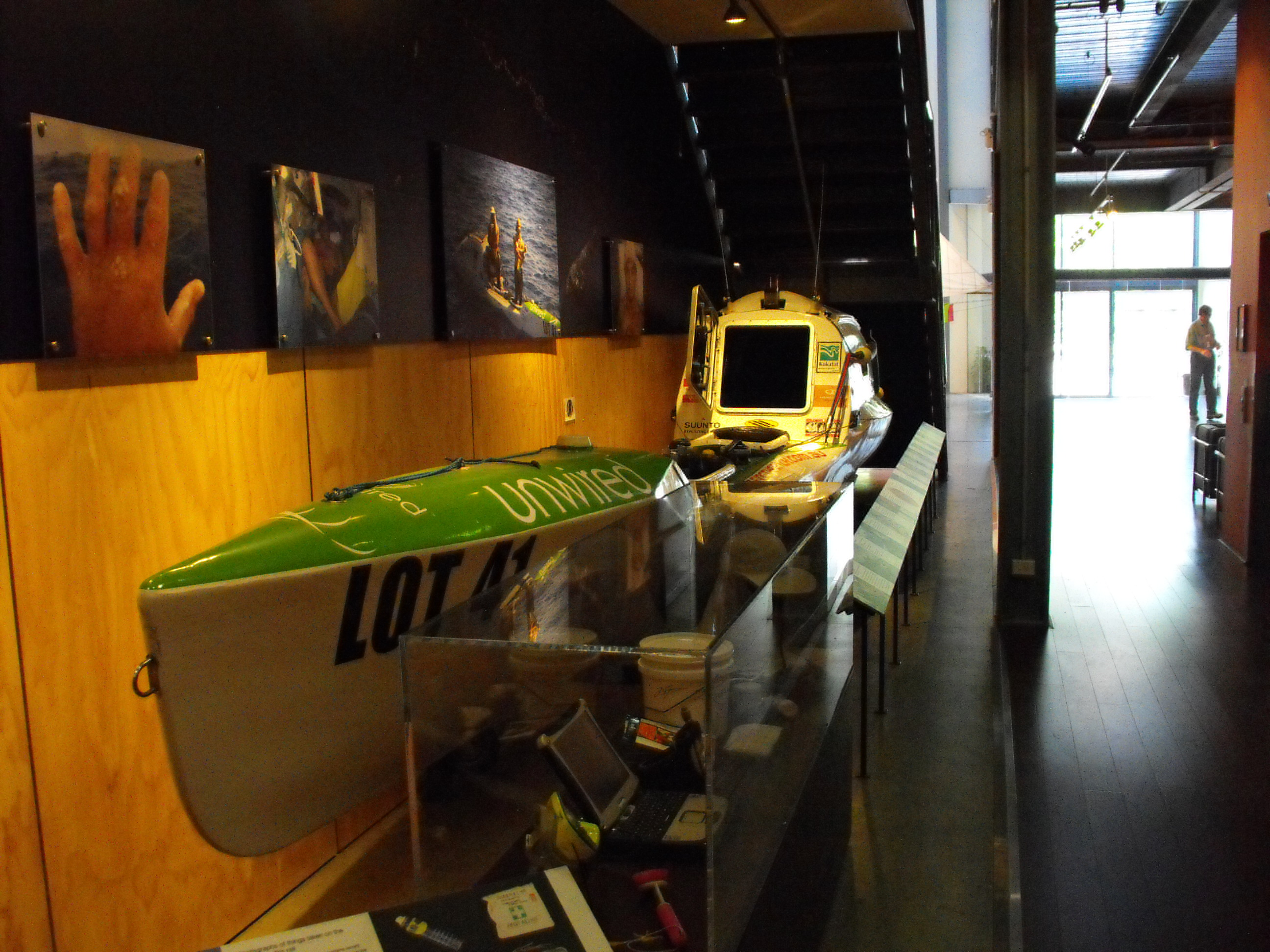
Lot 41 on display at the Australian National Maritime Museum's Wharf 7 complex

Lot 41 is named after the auction lot number of the race horse "Phar Lap", widely considered to be Australia and New Zealand's most famous racehorse. Born and bred in New Zealand, the thoroughbred destined to be Australia's wonder horse was known only as Lot 41 when he was sold at the 1928 National Yearling Sales near Wellington. Following his purchase by a Sydney trainer, the thoroughbred made the trans-Tasman crossing to Australia, where he became famous.

== Other trans-Tasman crossings ==
- Rowing
  - 1969. Anders Svedlund attempted a crossing from New Zealand to Australia, however he was over-turned five days after leaving from Auckland's Manukau Harbour and returned to New Zealand.
  - 1977. Colin Quincey, an England-born New Zealander, made the first successful human-powered trans-Tasman crossing. He took 63 days 7 hours to row his Yorkshire Dory row-boat from Hokianga, New Zealand to Marcus Beach on the Sunshine Coast of Australia.
  - 2007. Four Australians, led by Steven Gates, departed from Hokianga, New Zealand on 29 November. They arrived in Sydney Harbour on 30 December at 8:15 am, having taken 31 days to make the crossing.
  - 2010. Shaun Quincey completed the solo row from Australia to New Zealand in March 2010. Shaun is the son of Colin Quincey, who completed the reverse journey in 1977.
  - 2012. A team of five made a west–east crossing of the Tasman. Departed Sydney on 27 November 2011 in the boat Moana, arriving in Auckland on 20 January 2012. The team included James Blake, the son of Peter Blake. One of the crew – Martin Berka – had been dropped off at the Bay of Islands, as the boat made its way to Auckland.
- Kayaking
  - 2018. Scott Donaldson completed the first solo kayak solo crossing in July 2018, travelling from Coffs Harbour, Australia to Lord Howe Island, and then onto New Plymouth, New Zealand. He was resupplied en route.
  - 2023. Richard Barnes made the first non-stop, unassisted, unsupported solo crossing by kayak. He departed Hobart, Tasmania on 14 December 2022, arriving 67 days later at Riverton, Southland, on 18 February 2023.

== See also ==
- Sea Kayaking
- Ocean Rowing
- Cas and Jonesy
