= Anders Svedlund =

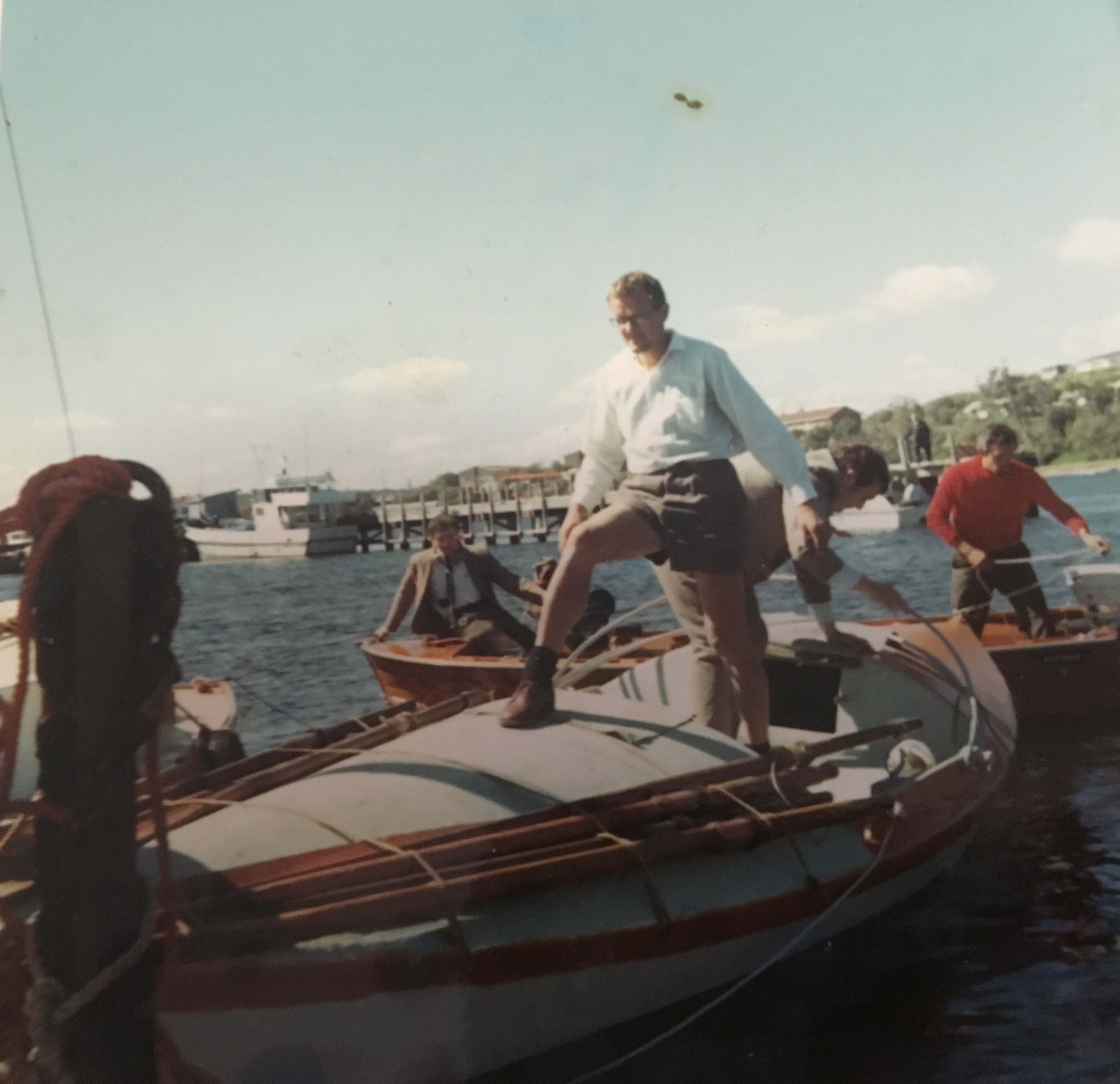
- Born: Anders Johan Svedlund; 1926; Mellösa, Sweden
- Died: 1979 (aged 52–53); Auckland, New Zealand
- Other names: Great Pacific Rower; The Crazy Swede
- Occupation: Ocean Rower
- Known for: Historic Ocean Rows

Anders Johan Svedlund (1926 in Mellösa, Sweden – 1979 in Auckland, New Zealand), was a Swedish born, naturalized New Zealand ocean rowing pioneer. Anders performed 2 of 14 Historic ocean rows listed by Ocean Rowing Society, the official Guinness Adjudicator for ocean rowing. He was the first to row the Indian Ocean, the first to row on the Pacific solo, and the fastest ocean rower of his times.

== Ocean Rowing ==
=== Historic Ocean Rows ===
Two ocean rows completed by Anders Svedlund were unassisted and unsupported, undertaken without water makers, without sat phones, without GPS, EPIRB or liferafts; conditions which are described by Ocean Rowing Society as "not much different from the days of Columbus", defining historic ocean rowers as "test pilots, but without a parachute".

=== Indian Ocean ===
In 1971 Anders Svedlund became the first to row the Indian Ocean from Kalbarri, Western Australia to a beach of Ankirikiriky, near Diego Suarez, Madagascar, taking 64 days in a boat called Roslagen, covering a distance of 4313 miles (3748 Nautical Miles or 6941 km), achieving average speed of 2,44 Knots (2,81Mph or 4,52 km/h). It was the fastest average speed achieved on any ocean up to date. The ocean was successfully crossed again by a solo rower over 30 years later in 2003. The overall speed record on the Indian Ocean was only broken by a team, over 40 years later in 2014 and has never been broken by a solo rower despite the attempts undertaken in newly designed, vastly technologically-advantaged boats. Svedlund's is the second longest standing ocean rowing speed record after the record of Frank Samuelsen and George Harbo. Anders Svedlund's boat, Roslagen, later renamed to Waka Moana, was the fastest boat in ocean rowing history from 1971 to 1992, when higher overall speed was finally achieved on the Atlantic Ocean by the 11 men team La Mondiale. Higher speed by a solo rower was achieved 31 years later (2002) on the relatively less challenging route, Atlantic Ocean Trade Winds I.

=== Pacific Ocean ===
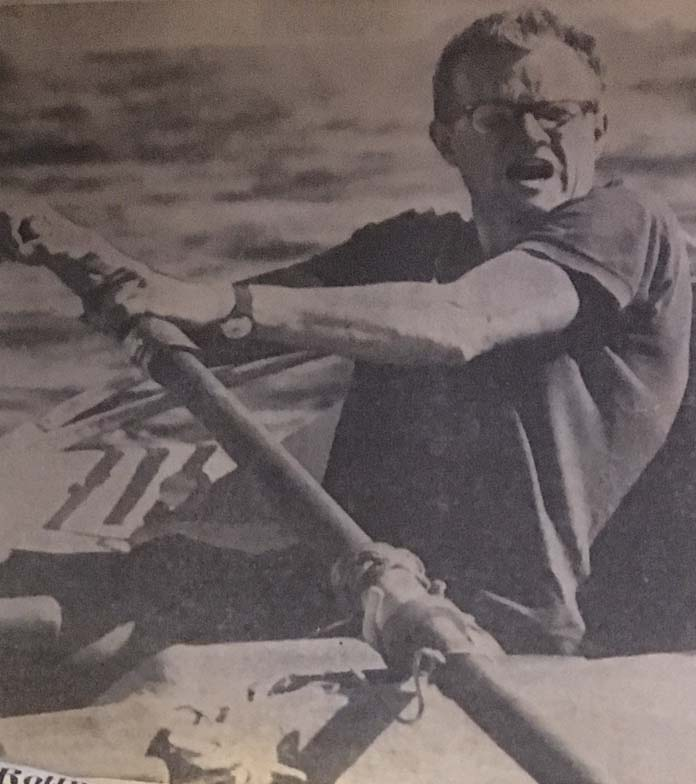
Anders Svedlund Ocean Rowing

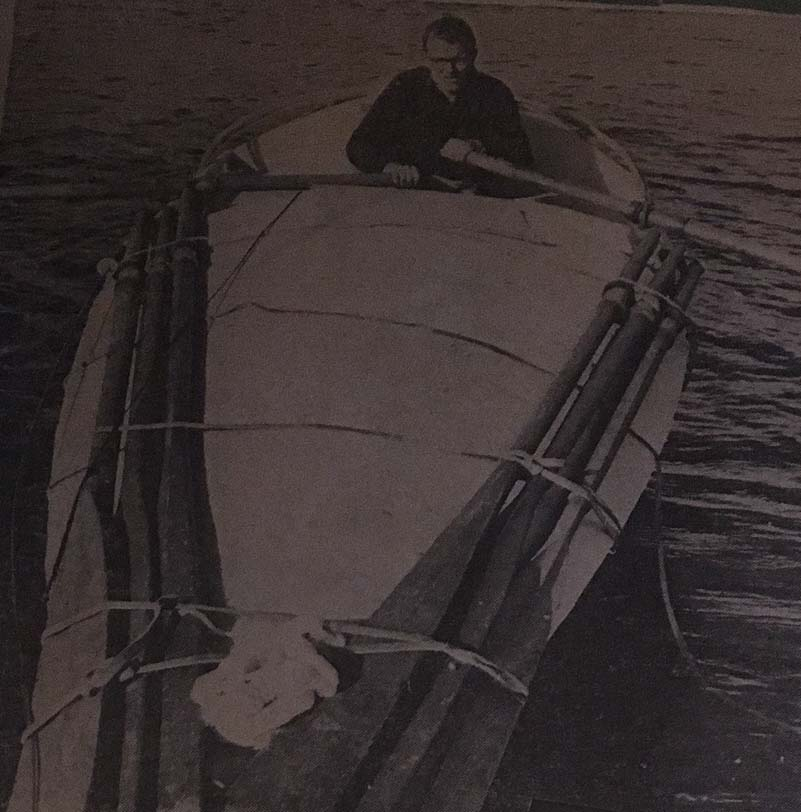
Anders Svedlund Ocean Rowing

Three years later in 1974 he became the first solo rower to row on the Pacific, still in the same boat renamed to Waka Moana from Chilie to West Samoa via Tahiti. The journey took him 191 days and covered 6462 Miles (5615 Nautical Miles or 10400 km). Upon his arrival in Tahiti he was welcomed by Marie-Therese Danielsson, wife of Bengt Danielsson, a crew member on the Kon Tiki raft expedition, who wrote an article on Anders for Pacific Islands Monthly in April 1983. Danielsson retrospectively titled Anders "The Great Pacific Rower", as by that time there were many other attempts made to row the Pacific that the achievement of Anders could be compared to.

== Approach to expeditions ==
Svedlund seemed to care very little for records, shunned all publicity, and never kept a log or wrote down the story of his accomplishments. After rowing across the Indian Ocean, he went straight back to Auckland, and, without telling a soul where he had been, resumed his old trade as a house painter.

In his “journals” he didn't write about risks and difficulties. His journals (when found) were full of his inner disputes on philosophical, existential and spiritual dilemmas. For him rowing seemed to be a mystical quest, and any achievement was a by-product of the journey.

When asked about the biggest difficulties of ocean rowing, Anders would mention: “The one thing I regret is that she heaves and rolls so much that it is absolutely impossible to stand on my head for any length of time. To function normally one must stand on one's head for at least an hour a day”. Anders was asked whether he was ever bored not having radio or books on board of his boat. He would answer that "the sea offered a splendid, ever-changing spectacle” It actually made him so happy that he often burst into song. Mostly he sang old Swedish folk songs he had learned as a child.

== Personal life ==
Anders was a teetotaler and a vegetarian.

== Legacy ==
A section of Maritime Museum in Auckland is dedicated to Anders Svedlund.

"Mariners Book Of Days" dedicated one day to Anders Svedlund.

== See also ==
- Peter Bird (rower)
- Colin Quincey
- Ove Joensen
