= Charles Hazlewood =

British conductor (born 1959)

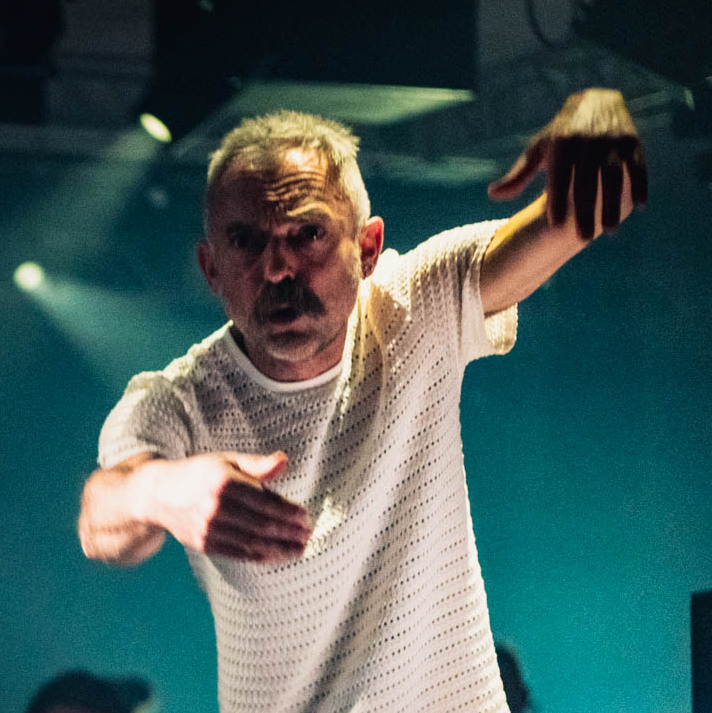
- in 2024

Background information
- Born: 14 November 1966 (age 59)
- Occupation: Conductor

Charles Matthew Egerton Hazlewood (born 14 November 1966) is a British conductor. After winning the European Broadcasting Union conducting competition in 1995 whilst still in his twenties, Hazlewood has had a career as an international conductor, music director of film and theatre, composer and a curator of music on British radio and television, Motivational Speaker and founder of Paraorchestra – the world's first integrated ensemble of disabled and non-disabled musicians. He was a guest on BBC Radio 4's Desert Island Discs in May 2019 and became Sky Arts' Ambassador for Music in January 2021. In 2023, Hazlewood was recognised for his 'outstanding contribution to the musical life of the UK' when awarded the Sir Charles Groves Prize by music charity Making Music.

== Education and early career ==
Hazlewood was born on 14 November 1966 to the Reverend Canon Ian Hazlewood and Helen Hazlewood. His brother is Will Hazlewood, an Anglo-Catholic bishop.

Hazlewood attended Christ's Hospital school in West Sussex where he was a chorister and organist. He later gained an organ scholarship to Keble College, Oxford in 1986, graduating in 1989. He made his London debut with his own chamber orchestra, Eos, in January 1991.

== Conductor ==
Hazlewood has conducted many orchestras, including the Swedish Radio Symphony Orchestra, the Copenhagen Philharmonic, and the Philharmonia Orchestra, as well as the Gothenburg Symphony Orchestra, Malmö Symphony Orchestra, Danish Radio Symphony Orchestra, Royal Concertgebouw Orchestra and Orchestra of St Luke's, New York.

He has conducted over 100 world premieres and is a founder of the British Paraorchestra, which performed together with the band Coldplay at the 2012 Summer Paralympics. He has also initiated several projects that explore common ground between different musical disciplines, such as "Urban Classic" (2006), which drew together five grime emcees and the BBC Concert Orchestra.

In 2003, Hazlewood formed Army of Generals, a period instrument orchestra, to record with him all the music for his BBC films on Mozart, Beethoven and the Birth of British Music. Army of Generals would regularly collaborate with Paraorchestra until the ensemble was fully integrated into Paraorchestra in 2019.

In 2008, Hazlewood formed his All Star Collective ensemble to play Tubular Bells at the Glastonbury Festival, featuring artists from across genres including Adrian Utley of Portishead, Will Gregory of Goldfrapp and jazz saxophonist Andy Sheppard. It went on to play the Queen Elizabeth Hall in London, Sage Gateshead and St George's Bristol in 2011, a re-enactment of Mike Oldfield's own group performance 38 years previously. In 2012, Jason Yarde and composer Graham Fitkin joined the All-Stars in a performance of Terry Riley's A Rainbow in Curved Air at the Bristol Old Vic.

In 2009, he staged his first festival "Play the Field" with Dragons' Den's Deborah Meaden with the mutual goal of bringing music to a wider audience in the West Country. The festival included a complete performance of Holst's The Planets which saw artists from his All-Star collective including Goldfrapp's Will Gregory and Adrian Utley of Portishead, saxophonists Andy Sheppard and Jason Yarde, drummer Tony Orrell, keyboardist Graham Fitkin and harpist Ruth Wall improvise electronic responses to each orchestral planet from a separate stage across the site. It was broadcast on BBC Radio 2 in September 2009.

In 2010, Hazlewood conducted a live score for the 1926 silent film The Passion of Joan Arc, composed by Adrian Utley and Will Gregory, commissioned by Bristol Beacon and Watershed Media centre. It opened at Bristol Beacon in May 2010.

His "Orchestra in a Field" festival took place at Glastonbury Abbey in 2012 with performances of Mussorgsky's Pictures at an Exhibition, Bizet's Carmen, Mike Oldfield's Tubular Bells and a collaboration with Professor Green and Labrinth.

Their "Thunderbirds are Go!" project was launched in 2014 at Glastonbury Festival, a celebration of work by composer Barry Gray. The show also featured at the BBC Radio 6 Music Festival in 2016 with guest vocalist Jarvis Cocker and members of Paraorchestra. Charles Hazlewood's All Star Collective was integrated into Paraorchestra in 2019.

== Paraorchestra ==
Hazlewood is Artistic Director of Paraorchestra, the world's first fully integrated ensemble of professional musicians with and without disabilities, which he founded together with television director Claire Whalley in November 2011. The orchestra was the subject of a documentary by Channel Four, screened in the hours between the end of the final sporting event at London 2012 Paralympics and the Closing Ceremony where they made their world debut alongside Coldplay.

Paraorchestra exists to recognise and showcase disabled musicians and demonstrate their full integration into orchestral music. Just as the Paralympics have achieved in sport, Paraorchestra aims to shift perceptions of disability in creating a platform for gifted disabled musicians to perform and excel at the highest level, integrating players with disabilities into mainstream performances.

In 2016, Paraorchestra performed the first orchestral headliner at Glastonbury Festival with Philip Glass' "Heroes" Symphony. They returned to the festival the following year in 2017 with Play! – a symphonic repertoire of songs from the gaming world, conducted by Hazlewood, which was performed again in 2018 at The Barbican, London.

In 2019 Paraorchestra took their Love Unlimited Synth Orchestra, conducted by Hazlewood, to The Park stage, celebrating the genius of Barry White alongside Gruff Rhys, Nadine Shah, Larry Heard, Eno Williams of Ibibio Sound Machine, YolanDa Brown, Adrian Utley, Clive Deamer and Lianne La Havas.

In 2017 Hazlewood created kraftwerk re:werk, a re-imagining of Trans-Europe Express by German electronic music pioneers Kraftwerk, which was first performed at Bristol's Simple Things Festival. The ensemble consisted of symphonic and electronic instruments performing an arrangement of fragments of melodies, rhythms, and sounds from the original album, composed by Charlotte Harding and Lloyd Coleman. In 2018 kraftwerk re:werk played The Marble Factory, Bristol, Brighton Dome, Basingstoke Anvil, and WOMAD festival in 2019.

The Anatomy of the Orchestra, created and conducted by Hazlewood in 2018, saw a 50-strong ensemble of Paraorchestra musicians spread across the Atrium of Bristol Beacon, performing Steve Reich's The Four Sections. The performance invited audiences to move about the space and explore the orchestra, creating their own sonic experience of the piece . It played the Arnhem Foyer, Fairfield Halls, Croydon in November 2018. In 2020, Hazlewood and Paraorchestra were commissioned by the British Council to perform a version of Anatomy of the Orchestra at Garage Museum of Contemporary Arts in Moscow as part of the UK-Russia Year of Music. An ensemble of Paraorchestra musicians performed work by JS Bach, Louis Andriessen, Nico Muhly and Peter Maxwell Davies.

In 2018 Hazlewood and Paraorchestra commissioned Goldfrapp's Will Gregory to write a score for The Nature of Why, an immersive music experience which fused live music by an ensemble of Paraorchestra musicians with contemporary dance. The Nature of Why was inspired by a spontaneous lecture from the Nobel-prize winning theoretical physicist Richard Feynman on why magnets repel each other and was directed by Hazlewood and Caroline Bowditch, choreographed by Bowditch, and conducted by Hazlewood, and opened Bristol's Mayfest in 2018. The Nature of Why opened Southbank Centre's Unlimited Festival in 2018 then toured to the Heath Ledger Theatre, WA as part of Perth Festival 2019 where The Western Australian dubbed it 'A modern ode to joy'. The Nature of Why toured the UK in 2019 playing Brighton Festival, Wales Millennium Centre in Cardiff, The Empress Ballroom at Winter Gardens, Blackpool, Kneehigh's Asylum in St Austell, and The Lowry in Salford.

Based on his 2018 BBC Programme, Tones, Drones, and Arpeggios: The Magic of Minimalism, Hazlewood created a stage version of Minimalism Changed My Life in 2019. A personal journey through 'the last big idea in classical music' was conducted and presented by Hazlewood, written by Jason Hazeley and performed by Paraorchestra at Queen Elizabeth Hall, Southbank Centre (September 2019) and Bridgewater Hall, (October 2019). The piece included performances of work by Terry Riley, Mike Oldfield, Philip Glass, Pauline Oliveros and Steve Reich and featured a visual narrative by video artist John Minton.

In 2021 Hazlewood and Paraorchestra created Death Songbook with Suede's Brett Anderson. The concert included an ensemble of musicians from Paraorchestra along with guest artists Nadine Shah, Adrian Utley and Seb Rochford and featured a collection of songs about loss and transcendence by artists such as Echo and the Bunnymen, Skeeter Davis, Japan, David Bowie/Jacques Brel, and Suede. It was pre-recorded on Wales Millennium Centre's Donald Gordon stage in January 2021 and streamed by BBC Cymru Wales as part of Gŵyl 2021 on 6 & 7 March.

The orchestra has toured to Russia, the Middle East, Greece and Australia, as well as playing throughout the UK.

== Music director for film and theatre ==
In 1995 Hazlewood and British theatre director Mark Dornford-May began working on a venture called Broomhill Opera in Kent, England. In 1999 they moved their operation to the largely derelict Wilton's Music Hall in East London, restoring it back into a living performance venue. As Music Director for Wilton's Music Hall Hazlewood conducted The Beggar's Opera (director Jonathan Miller) Britten's The Turn of the Screw (director Elijah Moshinsky), Puccini's Il Trittico (director Simon Callow) and Kurt Weill's The Silverlake with translation by Rory Bremner.

In 1999, Hazlewood and theatre director Mark Dornford-May created a new opera company in Cape Town from the townships and villages of South Africa; the mostly black lyric-theatre company DDK (Dimpho di Kopane, Sotho for "combined talents") was formed. Of the 40 members, only three had professional training. In January 2001, the company's debut of Bizet's Carmen opened to damning South African reviews, with one newspaper saying it was preposterous for black South Africans to perform Western opera. Their South African Carmen went on to tour internationally. Fiona Maddocks wrote in The Observer 'this is the Carmen by which all others should be measured'. Hazlewood was music director and conductor for the company's film version of Carmen, set in a township in South Africa, which won the Golden Bear award for Best Film at the 2005 Berlin International Film Festival. Their subsequent film, Son of Man, featured a score created by Hazlewood in collaboration with the company.

The Mysteries, for which Hazlewood devised the score, sold out in London's West End in 2003, inciting the first editorial on music in The Times newspaper in 40 years.

Hazlewood was music director of DDK from 2000 to 2007. With the company he also conceived the music for the shows Ibali Loo Tsotsi (The Beggar's Opera); and The Snow Queen, which premiered in New York in 2004.

In 2009, Hazlewood conducted Kurt Weill's musical drama Lost in the Stars, reset in apartheid South Africa, at the South Bank Centre.

In 2014, Hazlewood scored a reworking of John Gay's The Beggars Opera, Dead Dog in a Suitcase (and other love songs) written by Carl Grose and directed by Mike Shepherd for Kneehigh Theatre. The show toured the UK and internationally in 2015/16 and was listed in the top ten shows of 2014 by the Guardian newspaper.

In 2016 Hazlewood wrote the score for an operatic version of The Tin Drum by Günter Grass. The show featured a libretto by Carl Grose and was performed and produced by Kneehigh Theatre. It was highlighted as one of Susannah Clapp's top ten shows of 2017 in The Observer.

Hazlewood integrated mass karaoke into a show with Kneehigh's Ubu! in 2018 which had its debut to critical acclaim 'Singing truth to power: How Kneehigh's new show uses mass karaoke to topple a dictator' Independent in August 2018, and toured nationally in 2019.

== Television ==
Charles Hazlewood's first TV appearance was as music director on Jonathan Miller's Opera Works in 1996.

Hazlewood created the 2009 BBC Two documentary series The Birth of British Music. He has authored and conducted the music in BBC films on Mozart, Beethoven and Tchaikovsky as well as a series exploring the birth of British music. He also appeared on the judging panel for the reality show Classical Star (BBC2 2007) and anchored the BBC Proms TV coverage in 2008.

In 2011, Hazlewood commissioned leading instrument makers to create an orchestra of 44 instruments entirely from scrap. Documented by BBC Four, the film culminated in a performance of Tchaikovsky's 1812 Overture on the scrap instruments with BBC Concert Orchestra at the 2011 BBC Proms.

He authored and presented How Pop Songs Work (BBC Four, 2008); a film with Damon Gough (aka Badly Drawn Boy) entitled Stripping Pop (BBC Three, 2003); and a two part documentary Tones, Drones and Arpeggios: The Magic of Minimalism (BBC Four, 2018), on the history of minimalist music, in which he interviews the 'greats' of the genre: Terry Riley, Le Monte Young, Philip Glass and Steve Reich.

Hazlewood's documentary for Sky Arts, Beethoven and Me aired in January 2021. It featured members of Paraorchestra and was highlighted by New Statesman as 'Serious, high-minded and brilliant ... a stunning lesson in not patronising audiences.' The film centres on Beethoven's famous 5th Symphony for a detailed look at the life, genius, and mental health struggles of the great composer in the context of, and drawing parallels with, Hazlewood's own childhood trauma. Charles Hazlewood: Beethoven and Me was awarded Best Music Programme at the 2022 Broadcast Awards.

Hazlewood became Sky Arts' Ambassador for Music in 2021 in a move from the channel to invest further in UK arts mentoring diverse and emerging talent across literature, music, dance, theatre and visual arts.

== Radio ==
Hazlewood's radio show, The Charles Hazlewood Show on BBC Radio 2, won three Sony Radio Academy Awards in 2006. The musical selections are "linked together in surprising and productive new ways, with Mozart, for example, followed by Ivor Cutler, then The Streets, then Handel".

On 24 May 2020 Hazlewood was the guest in the BBC Radio 4 series Desert Island Discs, selecting Mozart's "Ach, ich fühl's" (conducted by Otto Klemperer and performed by Gundula Janowitz with the Philharmonia Orchestra), a selection of Ivor Cutler's poetry, and an espresso machine as his chosen favourite record, book and luxury item respectively. During the programme he revealed that he had been a victim of sexual abuse throughout his childhood.

== Motivational speaking ==
As a speaker, Hazlewood draws from his professional and personal life to speak on themes of vulnerability, leadership, trust, disruption, and creativity. He has presented two TED talks; Trusting the Ensemble (2011), The Debut of the British Paraorchestra (2012), and a TEDx; Why Authenticity Matters TEDx (2017).

== Other activities ==
Charles Hazlewood was a judge of the popular music industry's creativity awards the Mercury Music prize, in 2007, 2008, and 2009.

== Personal life ==
Hazlewood and his wife, Henrietta, have four children.
