= Nicholas McCarthy (pianist) =

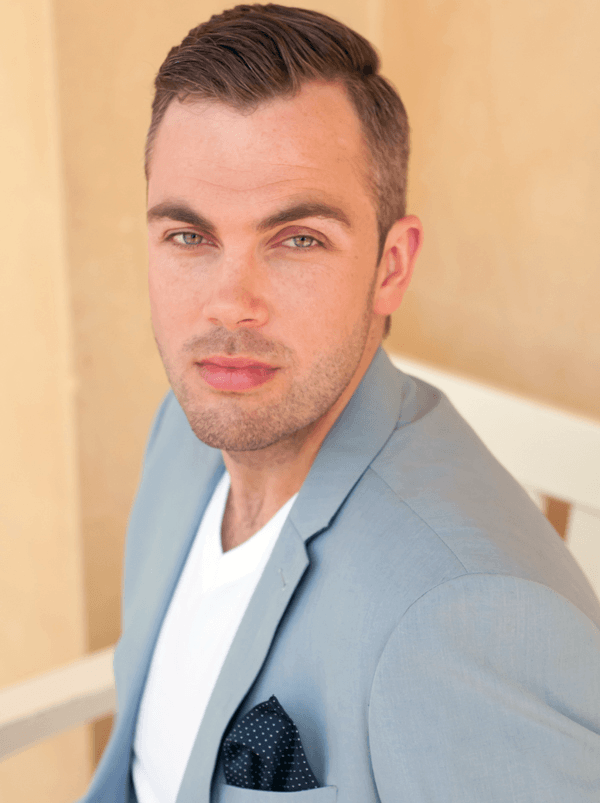

Background information
- Origin: Tadworth, Surrey, England
- Genres: Classical
- Occupation: Pianist
- Instrument: Piano
- Years active: 2011–present
- Website: nicholasmccarthy.co.uk

Nicholas McCarthy is a British classical pianist. He was born without a right hand and became the first left-hand-only pianist to graduate from the Royal College of Music in London in its 130-year history.

McCarthy was born in 1989 and raised in Tadworth, Surrey. He began his piano studies at age 14 and aged 17 was accepted into the Junior department at the Guildhall School of Music and Drama on the proviso that he focus specifically on repertoire written for the left hand, where he won the annual piano prize. He enrolled in the keyboard department at the Royal College of Music, becoming its first one-handed graduate in 2012.

McCarthy was an original member of the Paraorchestra, an ensemble founded by conductor Charles Hazlewood in 2011, which performed alongside Coldplay during the closing ceremony of the 2012 Summer Paralympics in London in September 2012. He left the Paraorchestra to pursue international solo tours.

On 23 September 2013, McCarthy spoke of his experiences at a TED conference held at the Royal Albert Hall. In 2014 he featured as a guest presenter for the BBC Proms televised broadcast.

On 4 November 2015, McCarthy appeared on BBC Radio 4's Front Row programme, during which he discussed the recording of his debut album Solo, which had recently reached Number 4 in the classical music charts. In 2018 the king, then Prince of Wales, made him an honorary member of the Royal College of Music.

On 20 July 2025 he made his debut at the BBC Proms at the Royal Albert Hall in London, performing Ravel's Piano Concerto for the Left Hand with the Bournemouth Symphony Orchestra and playing Alexander Scriabin's Nocturne (No.9) for Left Hand as his encore. He said the occasion was "a career milestone ... a dream come true". After the Proms, he planned to record a third album and perform with the Melbourne Symphony Orchestra in Australia.

McCarthy has cited Paul Wittgenstein, who commissioned left-hand pieces from various prominent composers after losing his right arm in World War I, as his hero. He worked with the ABRSM to develop a one-handed grading syllabus to support student pianists with limb differences, which launched in 2025.

== Arrangements ==
- Gershwin Summertime (Porgy and Bess) Arranged for the Left Hand Alone
- Mascagni Intermezzo (Cavalleria Rusticana) Arranged for the Left Hand Alone
- Rachmaninov Prelude Op. 23 No. 5 G minor Arranged for the Left Hand Alone
