= 55th Berlin International Film Festival =

2005 film festival in Berlin, Germany

- Festival poster
- Opening film: Man to Man
- Closing film: Kinsey
- Location: Berlin, Germany
- Founded: 1951
- Awards: Golden Bear: U-Carmen eKhayelitsha
- Hosted by: Anke Engelke
- No. of films: 312 films
- Festival date: 10–20 February 2005
- Website: Website

Berlin International Film Festival chronology
- 56th 54th

The 55th annual Berlin International Film Festival was held from 10 to 20 February 2005. Man to Man by Régis Wargnier served as opening night film. The festival closed with Kinsey by Bill Condon.

The Golden Bear was awarded to U-Carmen eKhayelitsha directed by Mark Dornford-May.

The retrospective was dedicated to the scene formers. It was titled Production Design + Film. Locations, Settings, Spaces and was divided into five sections and a total of 45 films were shown at the festival.

== Juries ==
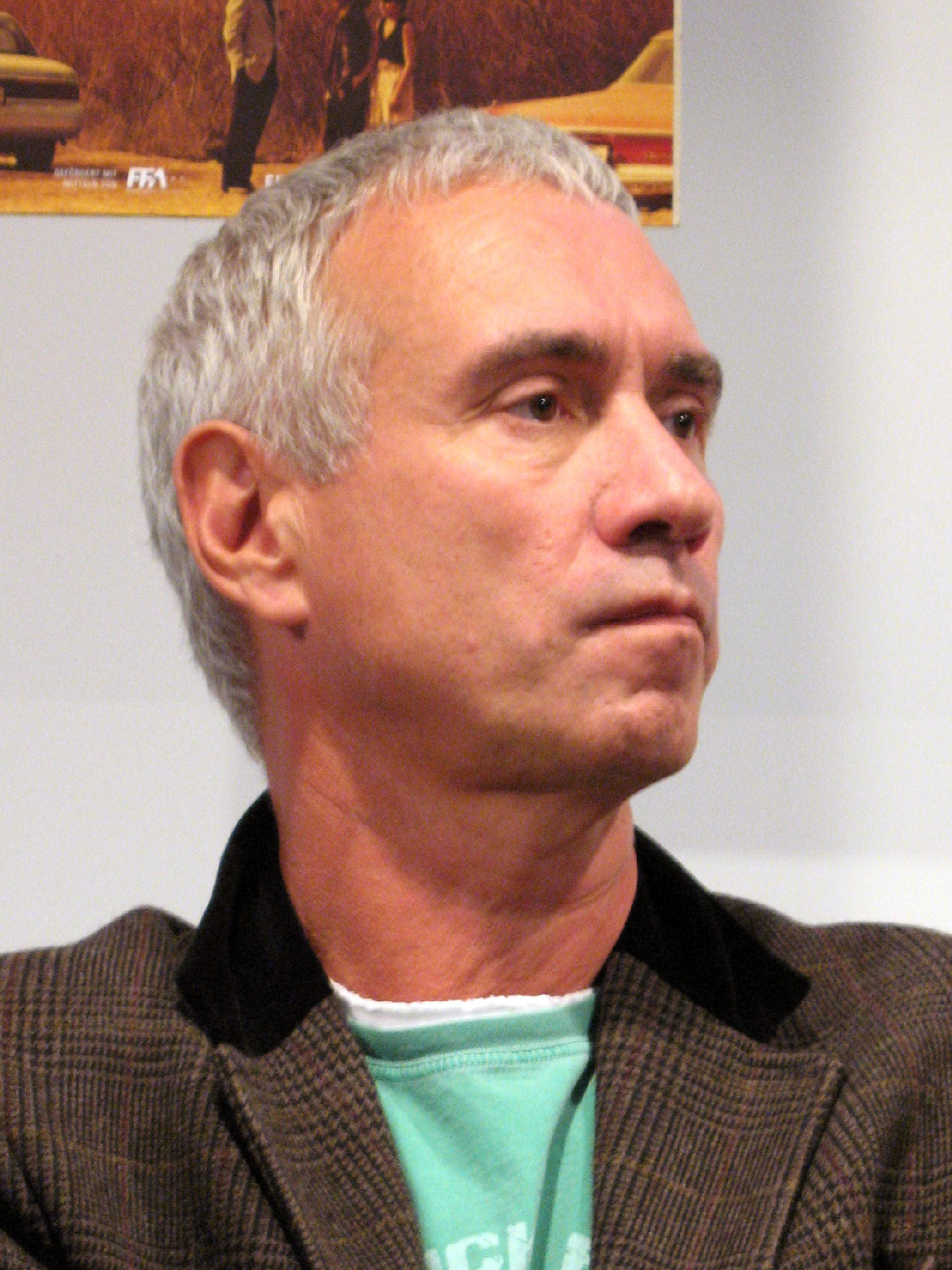
Roland Emmerich, Jury President

The following people were announced as being on the jury for the festival:

=== Main Competition ===
- Roland Emmerich, German filmmaker and producer – Jury President
- Ingeborga Dapkunaite, Lithuanian actress
- Bai Ling, Chinese actress
- Franka Potente, German actress
- Wouter Barendrecht, Dutch producer
- Nino Cerruti, Italian stylist and entrepreneur
- Andrey Kurkov, Ukrainian writer and screenwriter

=== Short Films Competition ===
- Gabriela Tagliavini, Argentinian filmmaker
- Marten Rabarts, New Zealand writer and producer
- Susan Korda, American director, editor and producer

== Official Sections ==
=== Main Competition ===
The following films were in competition for the Golden Bear and Silver Bear awards:

| English title | Original title | Director(s) | Country |
|---|---|---|---|
| Accused | Anklaget | Jacob Thuesen | Denmark |
| Asylum | | David Mackenzie | United Kingdom, Ireland |
| The Beat That My Heart Skipped | De battre mon cœur s'est arrêté | Jacques Audiard | France |
| Changing Times | Les Temps qui changent | André Téchiné | France |
| Fateless | Sorstalanság | Lajos Koltai | Hungary, Germany, United Kingdom |
| Ghosts | Gespenster | Christian Petzold | Germany |
| In Good Company | In Good Company | Paul Weitz | United States |
| The Hidden Blade | 隠し剣 鬼の爪 | Yōji Yamada | Japan |
| The Last Mitterrand | Le promeneur du champ de Mars | Robert Guédiguian | France |
| The Life Aquatic with Steve Zissou | | Wes Anderson | United States |
| Man to Man (opening film) | | Régis Wargnier | France, South Africa, United Kingdom |
| One Day in Europe | | Hannes Stöhr | Germany, Spain |
| Paradise Now | الجنّة الآن | Hany Abu-Assad | Palestine, France, Germany, Netherlands, Israel |
| Peacock | 孔雀 | Gu Changwei | China |
| Smalltown, Italy | | Stefano Mordini | Italy |
| Sometimes in April | | Raoul Peck | France, United States, Rwanda |
| Sophie Scholl – The Final Days | Sophie Scholl – Die letzten Tage | Marc Rothemund | Germany, Spain |
| The Sun | Сóлнце | Alexander Sokurov | Russia, France, Italy, Switzerland |
| Thumbsucker | | Mike Mills | United States |
| U-Carmen eKhayelitsha | | Mark Dornford-May | South Africa |
| The Wayward Cloud | 天邊一朵雲 | Tsai Ming-liang | Taiwan |
| Words in Blue | Les Mots bleus | Alain Corneau | France |

=== Short Films Competition ===
The following short films were selected:

| English title | Original title | Director(s) | Country |
|---|---|---|---|
| Don Kishot be'Yerushalaim | | Dani Rosenberg | Israel |
| Killing the Afternoon | | Margaret Corkery | Ireland, United Kingdom |
| The Intervention | | Jay Duplass | United States |
| Milk | | Peter Mackie Burns | United Kingdom |
| Jam Session | | Izabela Plucinska | Germany |
| The Information | Справка | Kira Muratova | Russia |
| Child in Time | | Maja Weiss | Slovenia |
| Gigolo | | Bastian Schweitzer | Germany, Switzerland |

== Official Awards ==
=== Main Competition ===
The following prizes were awarded by the Jury:

- Golden Bear: U-Carmen eKhayelitsha by Mark Dornford-May
- Silver Bear Jury Grand Prix: Peacock by Gu Changwei
- Silver Bear for Best Director: Marc Rothemund for Sophie Scholl – The Final Days
- Silver Bear for Best Actor: Lou Taylor Pucci for Thumbsucker
- Silver Bear for Best Actress: Julia Jentsch for Sophie Scholl – The Final Days
- Silver Bear for Best Film Music: Alexandre Desplat for The Beat That My Heart Skipped
- Silver Bear for Outstanding Artistic Contribution: Tsai Ming-liang for The Wayward Cloud

=== Honorary Golden Bear ===
- Fernando Fernán Gómez
- Im Kwon-taek

=== Short Films Competition ===
- Short Film Golden Bear:
  - The Intervention by Jay Duplass
  - Jam Session by Izabela Plucinska
- Honorable Mention: Don Kishot be'Yerushalaim by Dani Rosenberg

=== Berlinale Camera ===
- Daniel Day-Lewis
- Katrin Sass
- Helene Schwarz

== Independent Awards ==
=== Panorama Audience Award ===
- Best Feature Film: Live and Become by Radu Mihăileanu
- Best Short Film: Hi Maya by Claudia Lorenz

=== Crystal Bear ===
- Best Short Film: The Djarn Djarns by Wayne Blair
  - Special Mention:
    - Does God Play Football by Michael A. Walker
    - Wind by Erik van Schaaik
- Best Feature Film: Bluebird by Mijke de Jong
  - Special Mention:
    - The Italian by Andrey Kravchuk
    - The Color of Milk by Torun Lian
- 14plus Best Feature Film: Voces inocentes by Luis Mandoki
  - Special Mention: Turtles Can Fly by Bahman Ghobadi

=== FIPRESCI Award ===
- The Wayward Cloud by Tsai Ming-liang
