= Matthew Restall =

American Mayanist (born 1964)

Matthew B. Restall (born 1964) is a historian and author of over forty books. His work focuses on six areas of specialization: the Spanish Conquest era in America; Aztec (Mexica) and Maya history; the history of colonial Mesoamerica, primarily Yucatán but including Mexico, Guatemala, and Belize; the historical African diaspora in the Americas; the history of Christopher Columbus and what he calls Columbiana; and the history of popular music.

As a prominent ethnohistorian, he is a member of the New Philology school of colonial Mexican history and the founder of a related school, the New Conquest History. He is the Edwin Erle Sparks Professor of Latin American History and Anthropology, and Director of Latin American Studies at the Pennsylvania State University. He is a former president of the American Society for Ethnohistory (2017–18), a former editor of the Ethnohistory journal (2007–17) and of The Hispanic American Historical Review (2017–22), and editor of the book series Latin American Originals, and co-editor of the Cambridge Latin American Studies book series.

== Biography ==
Restall was born in a suburb of London, England, in 1964. He grew up in Copenhagen, Madrid, Caracas, Chicago, Tokyo, and Hong Kong, but was schooled in England from the age of eight, spending a decade in the English boarding school system (at Marsh Court in Hampshire and then at Wellington College), before going on to receive a BA degree, First Class with Honors, in Modern History from Oxford University in 1986. After a brief stint working in the art business in Los Angeles, he enrolled in the University of California, Los Angeles, earning an MA in 1989 and a PhD in 1992, both in Latin American History, studying under James Lockhart. After holding teaching positions in Texas and in Boston, he took up a tenured post at Penn State University in 1998.

In the last thirty years, Restall has published 24 books (41, counting revised and translated editions) and almost a hundred essays and articles. His books have been published in seven languages. Seven are available as audiobooks. His best-known books include Seven Myths of the Spanish Conquest—listed as one of the twelve Best History Books of 2003 by The Economist, available in five languages, and published in an updated edition in 2021—and When Montezuma met Cortés: The True Story of the Meeting That Changed History (HarperCollins, 2018), which won the 2019 Conference on Latin American History's Howard F. Cline Memorial Prize for best book or article "judged to make the most significant contribution to the history of Indians in Latin America."

His other books include The Maya World: Yucatec Culture and Society, 1550-1850 (1997), Maya Conquistador (1998), Invading Guatemala (with Florine Asselbergs, 2007), Latin America in Colonial Times (with Kris Lane, 2011; 2nd edition, 2018), The Conquistadors (with Felipe Fernández-Armesto, 2012), and Return to Ixil: Maya Society in an Eighteenth-Century Yucatec Town (with Mark Christensen, 2019). His book The Black Middle: Africans, Mayas, and Spaniards in Colonial Yucatan won the Conference on Latin American History's 2009 prize for best book on Mexican history. Restall has written three books with art historian Amara Solari: The Maya (2020, in Oxford’s Very Short Introductions series), The Maya Apocalypse and its Western Roots (2021), and The Friar and the Maya: Diego de Landa and the Account of the Things of Yucatan (with Solari as well as John F. Chuchiak and Traci Ardren, 2023), which also won the Conference on Latin American History prize for best book on Mexican history.

His most recent book is The Nine Lives of Christopher Columbus (published by Norton in 2025), a ground-breaking study of what Restall terms “Columbiana,” building upon three decades of teaching, research, and writing on Columbus and related histories. Many of the themes of his previous books—the histories of the Maya, of enslaved Africans in the Americas, and of comparative imperialism—are foundational to his current research for a book on the early history of Belize titled The Invention of Colonialism.

Restall's entry into the field of pop music history was initiated by Blue Moves (2020 in the 33 1/3 series), which was followed by two monographs: Ghosts: Journeys to Post-pop. How David Sylvian, Mark Hollis, and Kate Bush reinvented pop music (2024), and On Elton John (2025, in Oxford University Press’s Opinionated Guides series).

Restall has won fellowships from the National Endowment for the Humanities, the John Simon Guggenheim Foundation, the Institute for Advanced Study at Princeton, the John Carter Brown Library, the Library of Congress, the US Capitol Historical Society, Yale's Gilder Lehrman Center, and the UK’s Leverhulme Foundation. He was a Member of the Board of Governors of the John Carter Brown Library (2014–23), President of the American Society for Ethnohistory (2017–18), the Greenleaf Distinguished Professor of Latin American Studies at Tulane University (2020), and a Visiting Scholar at Harvard’s Dumbarton Oaks (2025).

Restall appears regularly on TV documentaries, radio shows, and podcasts, discussing the Aztecs, Mayas, Columbus, the Spanish conquistadors, and the history of rock and pop music.

His father was the widely published ornithological illustrator and author Robin Restall, his sister Emma Restall Orr was joint chief of the British Druid Order and is the author of popular books on Druidry, and his spouse is the above-mentioned art historian Amara Solari. He holds both British and US citizenship.

== Bibliography ==
- The Nine Lives of Christopher Columbus. New York: Norton. (2025)
- On Elton John. In the Opinionated Guides series. New York: Oxford University Press. (2025)
- Ghosts: Journeys into Post-pop: How David Sylvian, Mark Hollis, and Kate Bush reinvented pop music. Tewkesbury, UK: Sonicbond Publishing. (2024)
- 馬雅：被誤解的中美洲文明 / The Maya. Nanjing: Yilin Press. Bilingual edition. (2024)
- The Friar and the Maya: Diego de Landa and the Account of the Things of Yucatan (with Amara Solari, John F. Chuchiak, and Traci Ardren). Louisville: University Press of Colorado. (2023)
- 印第安帝国的覆灭. Shanghai: Dook Publishing. Chinese edition of When Montezuma Met Cortés. (2023)
- 馬雅：被誤解的中美洲文明. Taipei: Sunrise Press. Chinese edition of The Maya. (2022)
- 西班牙征服的七个神话. Shanghai: People’s Publishing House. Chinese edition of Seven Myths of the Spanish Conquest. (2022)
- The Maya Apocalypse and its Western Roots (with Amara Solari). Lanham, MD: Rowman & Littlefield. (2021)
- Seven Myths of the Spanish Conquest, Updated Edition. New York: Oxford University Press. (2021)
- Entre Mayas y Españoles: Africanos en el Yucatán Colonial. Mexico City: Fondo de Cultura Económica. (2020)
- The Maya: A Very Short Introduction (with Amara Solari). Oxford: Oxford University Press (2020)
- Blue Moves. New York: Bloomsbury, 33 1/3 series. (2020)
- Return to Ixil: Maya Society in an Eighteenth-Century Yucatec Town (with Mark Christensen). Boulder: University Press of Colorado. (2019)
- Cuando Montezumo conoció a Cortés. Mexico City: Taurus. Spanish edition of When Montezuma Met Cortés. (2019)
- When Montezuma Met Cortés: The True Story of the Meeting that Changed History. New York: Ecco/HarperCollins. (2018)
- Latin America in Colonial Times (with Kris Lane). Cambridge: Cambridge University Press. 2nd edition of 2011 book. (2018)
- I Sette Miti Della Conquista Spagnola. Palermo: 21 Editore. Italian edition of Seven Myths. (2017)
- Конкуридаторите. Sofia: Ashur. Bulgarian edition of The Conquistadors. (2017)
- Conquista de Buenas Palabras y de Guerra: una visión indígena de la conquista (with Michel Oudijk). Mexico City: UNAM. Revised edition of La Conquista Indígena. (2014)
- Los Conquistadores (with Felipe Fernández-Armesto). Madrid: Alianza Editorial. Spanish edition of The Conquistadors. (2013)
- The Conquistadors: A Very Short Introduction (with Felipe Fernández-Armesto). Oxford: Oxford University Press. (2012)
- Latin America in Colonial Times (with Kris Lane). Cambridge: Cambridge University Press. (2011)
- The Riddle of Latin America (with Kris Lane). Boston: Cengage. (2011)
- 2012 and the End of the World: The Western Roots of the Maya Apocalypse (with Amara Solari). Lanham: Rowman & Littlefield. (2011)
- The Black Middle: Africans, Mayas, and Spaniards in Colonial Yucatán. Stanford: Stanford University Press. (2009)
- Black Mexico: Race and Society from Colonial to Modern Times (editor, with Ben Vinson III). Diálogos series. Albuquerque: University of New Mexico Press. (2009)
- La Conquista Indígena de Mesoamérica: El caso de Don Gonzalo Mazatzin Moctezuma (with Michel Oudijk). Puebla, Mexico: Secretaría de Cultura del Gobierno del Estado de Puebla. (2008)
- Invading Guatemala: Spanish, Nahua, and Maya Accounts of the Conquest Wars (with Florine Asselbergs). Latin American Originals #2. University Park: Penn State University Press. (2007)
- Sete mitos da conquista espanhola. Rio de Janeiro: Civilização Brasileira. Portuguese edition of Seven Myths. (2006)
- Mesoamerican Voices: Native-Language Writings from Central Mexico, Oaxaca, Yucatán, and Guatemala (with Lisa Sousa and Kevin Terraciano). Cambridge: Cambridge University Press. (2005)
- Beyond Black and Red: African-Native Relations in Colonial Latin America (editor). Diálogos series. Albuquerque: University of New Mexico Press. (2005)
- Los siete mitos de la conquista española. Barcelona: Paidós (Paidós Orígenes #46). Spanish edition of Seven Myths. (2005)
- Seven Myths of the Spanish Conquest. New York: Oxford University Press. (2003)
- Maya Survivalism (editor, with Ueli Hostettler). Markt Schwaben, Germany: Verlag Anton Saurwein (Acta Mesoamericana No. 12). (2001)
- Maya Conquistador. Boston: Beacon Press. (1998)
- Dead Giveaways: Indigenous Testaments of Colonial Mesoamerica and the Andes (editor, with Susan Kellogg). Salt Lake City: University of Utah Press. (1998)
- The Maya World: Yucatec Culture and Society, 1550–1850. Stanford: Stanford University Press. (1997)
- Life and Death in a Maya Community: The Ixil Testaments of the 1760s. Lancaster, CA: Labyrinthos. (1995)
