= Philip Shallcrass =

Chief of the British Druid Order

- Born: 1953 (age 72–73)
- Other name: Greywolf
- Known for: British Druid Order

Philip Shallcrass (born 1953), often known by his Druid name, Greywolf, is Chief of the British Druid Order. He is an English artist, writer, poet, musician and singer-songwriter who pioneered a "shamanic" Druidism.

== Background ==
Philip Shallcrass was born in Sussex, England in 1953. His first visit to Avebury occurred in the 1970s. In 1974 he discovered Druidry through reading Robert Graves' The White Goddess. In the same year, Shallcrass read Mircea Eliade's Shamanism: Archaic Techniques of Ecstasy. Eliade's book contained descriptions of the visionary experiences of shamans that mirrored events in Shallcrass's own life. Further studies convinced him that Druidry was the earliest recorded form of native European shamanism. As a child Shallcrass was familiar with the Christian church; later, he would be inspired by the Welsh medieval text The Mabinogion and its stories. Shallcrass went on to run an occult bookshop in St. Leonards before being asked to join Alex Sander's coven, an offer which he would turn down. After working on Wicca with a different group Shallcrass went on to form the Grove of the Badger, a group based on Druidic principles. As a result of running a Druid group he decided that he was running a religious house as a response to Margaret Thatcher and the poll tax, providing proof of this to the relevant authorities which would propel him further along the course of Druidry. Meetings with Philip Carr Gomm and his wife Stephanie led to Shallcrass joining The Council of British Druid Orders and running a stall at a Pagan Federation national conference. During a sweat lodge at an OBOD camp in 1994, Shallcrass made contact with a wolf spirit who would become his spiritual guide and guardian.

== Work ==
In 1978, Shallcrass joined an Alexandrian Wiccan coven, being initiated a High Priest the following year. During the course of that year, he had been writing seasonal festival rites for the coven. These were heavily influenced by his studies in Druidry. By the time the festival cycle was complete, the coven's celebrations had become so Druidic in flavour that the members agreed to stop calling themselves a coven and become instead a Grove; the Grove of the Badger. This is now seen as the Mother Grove of the British Druid Order (BDO).

Over the years that followed, the material written for the Grove of the Badger was revised and added to. At the end of the 1980s it began to be published and bring the BDO to wider attention. He married Eleanor Kilpatrick, an Occupational Therapist with the NHS, in 1985. In the early 1990s, Kilpatrick and Shallcrass met and began a continuing friendship with Philip and Stephanie Carr-Gomm, chiefs of the Order of Bards, Ovates and Druids. Philip Shallcrass began to lecture on Druidry at a series of conferences on New Religious Movements.

In 1992, he became editor of The Druids' Voice: the Magazine of Contemporary Druidry.

In 1993, at the invitation of Tim Sebastion, founder of the Secular Order of Druids, Shallcrass composed a ritual to be performed at a multi-faith conference Tim had organised among the old stone circles of Avebury in Wiltshire. This resulted in the formation of the Gorsedd of Bards of Caer Abiri, which grew over the next few years to become what Ronald Hutton described as the "central event" of the New Druidry, initiating many people into the Bardic grade. A detailed account of the first event was published in The Gorsedd of Bards of Caer Abiri Newsletter No. 1, where Shallcrass took the role of Chief Druid (equivalent to Master of Ceremonies) with the assistance of Philip Carr Gomm of the Order of Bards Ovates and Druids. Another detailed account of the Gorsedd was later provided in the Pagan Federation's journal Pagan Dawn.

In 1994, following what he described as a powerful vision in a sweat lodge, Shallcrass adopted the Druid name, Greywolf. In 1995, he began to work regularly with Emma Restall Orr, who became joint chief of the BDO. Together, they lectured, hosted workshops and rituals, wrote new material for the Order, and appeared on TV and Radio in the UK and elsewhere.

The "shamanic" form of Druidry pioneered by Shallcrass with the British Druid Order resulted in bringing the shamanic vision of the World Drum Project to ceremonies at Dragon Hill, below the Uffington White Horse hill figure in Oxfordshire, and at Avebury in Wiltshire.

Shallcrass has created a series of distance learning courses on Druidry for the British Druid Order covering all three grades of Bard, Ovate and Druid as a series of monthly booklets. The course comes with recommendations from prominent figures including Professor Ronald Hutton and Robin Williamson.

The closing ceremony of the 2012 Paralympics included text from a 1997 Gorsedd ritual written by Philip Shallcrass and Emma Restall Orr.

Shallcrass has been active in areas of ancient technology such as roundhouse building at the Wildways retreat centre in Shropshire. He has also created numerous songs and chants, and worked with instruments including the drum, the chrotta and the tiompan. Some of these performances draw upon Shallcrass's knowledge of the Medieval period and its poetry and literature including metrical dinsenchas, while also being inspired by classical poems such as The Song of Amergin from the Mabinogion and The Battle of Cad Goddeu.

== Books ==
Publications by Philip Shallcrass include:

- A Catalogue of Occult Books, MRG, Hastings, 1978
- A Druid Directory: A Guide to Druidry and Druid Orders , British Druid Order, Devizes, 1995, with revised editions 1997, 2001 (with Emma Restall Orr)
- Druidry: Rekindling the Sacred Fire , (with Emma Restall Orr and others), British Druid Order, Wiltshire, 1996, with revised editions 1999, 2002
- The Passing of the Year: A Collection of Songs and Poems, Spells and Invocations, British Druid Order, Wiltshire, 1997, reprinted 1999, 2001
- The Story of Taliesin, British Druid Order, Wiltshire, 1997
- The Remembering Soul: A Collection of Songs and Poems, Spells and Invocations, British Druid Order, Wiltshire, 2001
- Articles by Philip Shallcrass appear in:
- Talking Stick Magickal Journal, issue i, volume ii, Talking Stick Publications, 1996
- The Druids' Voice: The Magazine of Contemporary Druidry, British Druid Order, 1992-date
- Tooth & Claw: Journal of the British Druid Order, British Druid Order, 1995-date
- Druidry A Practical & Inspirational Guide. Pretanic Press. 2023. ISBN 978-1-915604-00-2.
