= Dimpho di Kopane =

Dimpho di Kopane (Sesotho for Combined Talents) is a South African theatre cooperative. The company started in 2000 (25 years ago) and has 32 members. It has risen to prominence in South Africa after a successful stage rendition of Bizet's Carmen which then went on to tour to the US, Australia, Canada, Turkey and the UK. Following this, the company made U-Carmen eKhayelitsha, a Xhosa-medium opera set in the Cape Town township of Khayelitsha. This film won the Golden Bear for Best Film at the Berlin Film Festival of 2005. It was followed by the equally successful Son of Man, which premiered at the Sundance Festival.
