= The Inter Faith Network =

Interfaith charity in the United Kingdom

The Inter Faith Network for the United Kingdom
- Successor: The Inter Faith Network for the United Kingdom
- Founded: June 1987
- Founder: Brian Pearce
- Dissolved: February 2024
- Type: Interreligious organization
- Purpose: Interfaith dialogue
- Location: London, United Kingdom
- Region served: United Kingdom
- Key people: Harriet Crabtree, Deputy Director then sole Executive Director 1990-2024; Brian Pearce, Director 1987-2007
- Website: www.interfaith.org.uk

The Inter Faith Network for the United Kingdom (also known as The Inter Faith Network or IFN) was a charity in the United Kingdom which had the objects "to advance public knowledge and mutual understanding of the teachings, traditions and practices of the different faith communities in Britain including an awareness both of their distinctive features and their common ground and to promote good relations between persons of different faiths". Since 2001, the Inter Faith Network was funded in several millions of pounds by the British government, until its state funding was terminated in 2024 following multiple legal and regulatory complaints of harassment, bullying and malfeasance by IFN officials, and allegations of legitimising the influence of extremist groups. In 2025, the Inter Faith Network for the United Kingdom was re-founded under new management.

The Inter Faith Network drew on the pre-existing example of "Scottish Interfaith Week" and every year listed on its "Inter Faith Week" website various inter-religious events which were in actuality organised, financed and run mainly by other institutions and groups unconnected to the IFN; and IFN officials participated in meetings hosted by the Church of England and Lambeth Palace with members of the British royal family and government officials.

In 2023, the Church Times reported the publication by the Inter Faith Network of Deep connections: Women's local inter faith initiatives in the UK and quoted Harriet Crabtree, IFN Executive Director, "This research project shows the richness and value of women's local inter faith initiatives...these initiatives make a significant contribution to inter faith understanding and cooperation, help women's voices be heard".

Peer-reviewed academic publications and newspaper articles record that over its history the Inter Faith Network was the subject of multiple legal challenges and complaints to government regulatory bodies for alleged religious discrimination, as well as widespread allegations of bullying and harassment by the IFN Executive Director, Harriet Crabtree, IFN Trustee, Guy Wilkinson, and other IFN officials against whistleblowers of malfeasance within the organisation. On 19 January 2024, Michael Gove, Secretary of State of the Department for Levelling Up, Housing and Communities announced the termination of taxpayer funding to the Inter Faith Network citing the UK government's "serious concerns" with the IFN and the "reputational risk" to the state.

Against the background of these controversies, including the expressed "anger" of officials at the Department for Levelling Up, Housing and Communities with the Inter Faith Network and its officers, the termination of government funding, as well as complaints by former IFN Trustees to the Charity Commission for England and Wales, on 7 February 2024 the IFN Board of Trustees announced its decision to move for closure of the organisation. On 22 February 2024, the Board of the Inter Faith Network confirmed its prior decision to close the charity following receipt of a letter from the Secretary of State that he would not reverse his termination of government funding, and concurrently Communities Minister, Felicity Buchan, said that while the government would continue supporting other charities that promote interfaith dialogue, they would not change their stance over funding to the IFN.

The government funding cut and closure decision of the Inter Faith Network caused its supporters to express dismay and criticism, and an article on the Independent Catholic News website states, "The timing of this ill-advised decision could not come at a worse time and it sends all the wrong signals about inter faith. I am so passionate about this that I have written to HM the King!" Interfaith Consultant for Liberal Judaism, Mark Solomon, commented, "It is disgusting that this is happening. Shame on the morally and spiritually bankrupt government that is inflicting such a grave and unnecessary injury on our fragile interfaith institutions, which are needed more than ever". A statement criticising the government decision was issued by UK Quaker interfaith activists which stated, "We, as Quakers in Britain, are angered by this act of political interference intended to harm the faith relations work of this tiny, yet disproportionately effective, organisation that is the nation’s most prominent interfaith instrument".

The offices of the Inter Faith Network finally closed on 30 April 2024, as reported on the organisation website and Twitter account. On 21 January 2025, the Inter Faith Network was dissolved as a company by Companies House, and on 11 February 2025 it was struck off as a charity by the Charity Commission for England and Wales.

In 2024, the Faith and Belief Forum and other former IFN Member organisations convened an ad hoc group, and the following year published a report which recommended that Inter Faith Week must continue in recognition of all that religious diversity contributes to public life in the UK, but needs to move "beyond the bubble" of those already involved.

On 16 January 2025, the Inter Faith Network for the United Kingdom was re-founded under new management, and incorporated as a charitable company by former IFN Trustees, interfaith academics and clergy of different religions, including those who had raised concerns about alleged abuse and malfeasance in the previous organisation. On 16 May 2025, the reincorporated Inter Faith Network acquired ownership of the trademarks of the dissolved charity.

== Membership ==
The Inter Faith Network was a charity which had nearly 200 member bodies in affiliation. It was founded in 1987 by its first director, Brian Pearce; in 1990 Harriet Crabtree became deputy director, and in 2007 the sole executive director. Except for one brief term of office then resignation of a Scottish Anglican co-chair, for the entirety of the history of the organisation, the Inter Faith Network was led by a co-chair who was a Church of England bishop or senior clergyman who typically remained in post for years, together with a more frequently rotating non-Christian co-chair.

From 2001, the IFN was funded in several millions of pounds by the British taxpayer, and had prominently among its affiliate organisations in membership the Muslim Council of Britain and The Islamic Foundation whose parent body is the South Asian Islamist political movement Jamaat-e-Islami, and Vishva Hindu Parishad, a far-right Hindu Nationalist group which is part of the Sangh Parivar network led by Rashtriya Swayamsevak Sangh. Sam Westrop, Senior Fellow of the Gatestone Institute, wrote "By championing these Islamists as the 'voice' of British Islam, the Inter Faith Network falsely legitimizes these extremist groups, such as the Muslim Council of Britain, to be sincerely representative of British Muslims. A 2007 survey revealed, however, that 94% of British Muslims do not believe that the Muslim Council of Britain represents their views".

=== Political Lobbying ===
Andrew Dawson, professor of modern religion at Lancaster University, presents a critique of the Inter Faith Network's patronage and promotion of "faith community representatives", and the corrupting effect of money and power. He writes: "The politics and practice of religious diversity in the UK are best understood as closely associated with two other state orchestrated agendas: social order and service provision". Dawson charts how, since both 9/11 and cuts in public spending, Tony Blair’s New Labour opened a "policy window" for faith organisations which were skilful at navigating access to political opportunity structures both to lobby for their interests, and acquire material benefits for themselves, such as tendering for government contracts to deliver public services on the cheap. He states with specific reference to the IFN:

"Whereas the most obvious of these organisational benefits come in the form of state-sponsored commissions, grants and subventions, the resources accrued through accessing political opportunity structures comprise a varied range of material goods and immaterial means (e.g. budget, personnel, plant, premises, reputation, influence, and status)".

Amanda van Eck Duymaer van Twist, Deputy Director of INFORM writes from her academic study and qualitative research interviews with members of the Inter Faith Network that:

"IFN has encouraged a structure of self-appointed leaders within communities where that traditionally would not have been appropriate. Moreover, these leaders did not necessarily have credibility within their communities...IFN represents the politicization of faith communities".

Duymaer van Twist continues and reports "resentment that the IFN had become such an established institution, with strong government and Church of England support, that some began to see it as a 'gatekeeper' that could grant or withhold 'legitimacy' to religious groups by way of membership".

Amanda van Eck Duymaer van Twist cites a report, "The Interfaith Industry", on the Inter Faith Network and other groups, which was published by Sam Westrop of "Stand for Peace" in November 2013.. She writes that the report "attacked some of its former members, notably one of its Co-Chairs, Dr Manazir Ahsan [of the Islamic Foundation], and other Executive Committee members for their links with organizations that it perceived to be extremist...and condemned the IFN's Director for not challenging this".

=== Legal Challenge ===
Dawson details the successful legal challenge to the Inter Faith Network by human rights law firm Bindmans LLP arising from the IFN's refusal in 2012 to admit to membership The Druid Network, which story was broken nationally by The Times newspaper. A multi-signature letter published on the case by clergy of different faiths in the Church Times states:

"The rejection by the IFNUK of the lawfully recognised faith charity the Druid Network raises serious concerns about possible religious discrimination under the Equality Act 2010, which have been discussed in an expert legal statement published by the leading human-rights law firm Bindmans LLP (see [http://www.religiousfreedom.org.uk/legal/ www.religiousfreedom.org.uk/legal])...In particular, this activates questions related to Section 149 of the Equality Act 2010 concerning the Public Sector Equality Duty of government and public bodies to consider issues of religious discrimination and exclusion that may arise when they decide to give the money of British taxpayers as public funding to interfaith and other groups".

The lawyer for the Inter Faith Network, Philip Kirkpatrick of Bates Wells and Braithwaite LLP, unsuccessfully attempted to argue in his Advice Note that "the purpose of the organisation...namely to 'foster or maintain good relations between persons of different religions or beliefs'" justified the refusal by the Inter Faith Network of the Druid Network membership application. Kirkpatrick tried to claim a religious exemption for the IFN from equalities and human rights legislation under Schedule 23 of the Equality Act 2010: "An example of this might be a decision by an interfaith organisation not to accept a membership application from a particular faith organisation if the admission to membership of the organisation could have the effect of leading to representatives of the bodies of major faith communities withdrawing from membership of that inter faith organisation". In response, John Halford of Bindmans LLP responded, "This argument is imaginative, but fundamentally bad...it conflates two very different things: an organisation's purpose and the ease with which it can be fulfilled...the IFN does not need to discriminate against Druids 'because of' its purposes or at all. Those purposes are not concerned with the relationship or position of any particular set of faiths. They are simply concerned with 'different faiths' in Britain".

Peter Colwell, deputy general secretary of Churches Together in Britain and Ireland (CTBI) writes of the tendency of interfaith bodies "to compete with each other and to make inflated claims of their own impact", while the CTBI Inter Faith Theological Advisory Group also addresses the politics of interfaith “gatekeepers” and blocking of admission to membership of the Inter Faith Network: "An argument that gives power over inclusion or exclusion to what can now be seen as the vested interests of existing dialogues where those dialogues have a political significance seems dangerous".

== Governance ==
Muhammad Al-Hussaini, Senior Lecturer in Islamic Studies at the Oxford Centre for Religion and Public Life, writes, "Throughout its history, the IFN has been chaired by a largely static Church of England bishop or senior Anglican cleric, and a more frequently rotating non-Christian co-chair". He asserts that "Since its creation by its lifetime salaried Directors, Harriet Crabtree and Brian Pearce, the IFN has embodied the vested interests of a monetised Interfaith Industry and the project of the Church of England hierarchy to reinvent itself as a primus inter pares 'head boy of Eton' for all UK faiths, just as England's bishops chase continued political relevance in the face of the C of E's own terminal decline in congregational numbers". He writes, "What is less immediately visible is the extent to which the controlling Crabtree-esque politics of these Anglican-led faith and interfaith organisations are realised through the systematic abuse and bullying of whistleblowers, as a routine modus operandi", and he extensively documents in the book alleged harassment by the IFN Executive Director, Harriet Crabtree, and IFN Trustee, Guy Wilkinson. He further states, "IFN officers shouted me down for complaining about this issue at their annual general meetings...IFN didn't serve as a network, but an empire run by a coterie, a cabal".

=== Termination of Government Funding ===
In December 2023, The Sunday Telegraph published two articles which cited a statement from a spokesman of the Department for Levelling Up, Housing and Communities that the British government had "serious concerns" about the Inter Faith Network, and that IFN member bodies had written to the Department urging that "the Government should stop funding the network 'until serious and longstanding issues' are addressed'". The newspaper reported on the Inter Faith Network that "Michael Gove's department is concerned about the failure of a taxpayer-funded interfaith group to explicitly condemn Hamas's attack on Israel".

In January 2024, the Sunday Telegraph published an article which stated that Secretary of State, Michael Gove, "intends to stop funding" the Inter Faith Network and that he wrote to the IFN on 19 January 2024 stating "that he planned to withdraw taxpayer funding because of the 'reputational risk'" to the government. Gove wrote:

"I am writing to inform you that I am minded to withdraw the offer of new funding to the Inter Faith Network for the UK for the financial year 2023/24. Since my officials wrote to Dr Harriet Crabtree on 7 July 2023 to inform her that this department would make this offer subject to robust financial and due diligence checks, it has come to my attention that a member of the Muslim Council of Britain (MCB) has been appointed as a trustee of the Inter Faith Network".

The Church Times reported the response and criticism by the IFN of the government decision: "The Inter Faith Network (IFN) said that it had not been asked to proscribe membership of any individual, nor had it previously been advised by the department to expel any MCB members because of the Government's policy of non-engagement". The report stated that, "The Government does not engage with the MCB, after a former member appeared to condone attacks on the British navy in 2009".

In 2009, The Observer newspaper reported that Daud Abdullah, Deputy Secretary General of the MCB, and other prominent interfaith British Muslim leaders, had signed the Istanbul Declaration: "Dr Daud Abdullah, deputy director-general of the Muslim Council of Britain, is facing calls for his resignation, after it emerged that he is one of 90 Muslim leaders from around the world who have signed a public declaration in support of Hamas and military action". Premier Christian News quoted Ibrahim Mogra, a leading former IFN Trustee and former Assistant Secretary General of the Muslim Council of Britain leader, speaking at a press conference organised for Inter Faith Network supporters following the government announcement that it would terminate IFN funding:

"Ibrahim Mogra, another former deputy secretary general of the MCB, insisted the man had not signed the Istanbul Declaration on the council's behalf, and said the council had refused the government's order to step him down, given he was 'democratically elected' to the board, and had no legal charge against him. He told the Religious Media Centre the MCB had been a leading contributor to the Inter Faith Network and that the government were only engaging with Muslim groups that were 'favourable to the government's own agenda and policies'".

The Guardian newspaper also reported the defence by the Inter Faith Network Co-Chairs of its relationship with the Muslim Council of Britain as a leading IFN member body: "Although the government can choose not to engage with it, that is not a sensible option open to the IFN if it is to achieve the purposes for which the government funds it in the first place".

=== Charity Commission Complaint ===
Satish Sharma, General Secretary of the National Council of Hindu Temples and Former IFN Trustee, alleges that the Inter Faith Network has been, "From the outset a colonialist project to enforce and reinforce the ascendancy of the established Church of England over non-Christian faith communities in engagement with the British state. And in this, Crabtree and Pearce have acted as ruthless controlling agents and self-appointed gatekeepers". Sharma goes on to claim, "The IFN Executive Director and other IFN officials have at times set themselves up as 'self-appointed gatekeepers' for interfaith work...The abuses of power have exponentiated over the four IFN decades of this coercive control, gaslighting and bullying of critics". Sharma asserts:

"Over a number of years, my organisation along with a large number of faith leaders of different churches and religions, university academics and government officials, whom I have met, have raised strong concerns about the Inter Faith Network...These concerns range from issues of power, governance and accountability in the IFN, to very serious concerns of alleged bullying, discrimination and safeguarding matters, where some colleagues have suffered varying degrees of severe harassment to their professional and personal lives outside the IFN as a result of our having raised complaints and concerns about the behaviour of IFN officials".

The Sunday Telegraph reported that Member of Parliament, Holly Lynch, proposed an Adjournment Debate on the Inter Faith Network in the House of Commons on 10 January 2024, and it reported, "Speaking in a Commons debate, Ms Lynch – who is supportive of the IFN – said that money apparently pledged by DLUHC to tide over the organisation between July 2023 and March 2024 had not yet materialised". The same article reported that Member of Parliament, Bob Blackman, stated during the debate that there had been "criticisms of the Inter Faith Network – not necessarily about its aims, but about the way it has been run" and he said, "I have also heard criticism of the way it is being run". In January 2024, another former IFN Trustee filed an official complaint against the Inter Faith Network, its Executive Director, Harriet Crabtree, and other officials to the Charity Commission for England and Wales under Commission-protected conditions of anonymity.

== Closure ==
On 7 February 2024, the Board of Trustees of the Inter Faith Network announced "an in principle decision to move towards closure of the organisation". An article in The Sunday Telegraph "revealed that officials at the Department for Levelling Up, Housing and Communities had also been angered" with the Inter Faith Network, and that in an IFN email sent to member groups "IFN's co-chairs, Canon Hilary Barber and Narendra Waghela, referenced the controversy, saying that 'funding is not the only issue'...noting there was 'some indication of anger on the part of some that IFN has not aligned itself with particular positions or stood in support of them'".

On 22 February 2024, the BBC reported that the Inter Faith Network Board of Trustees had met on that day and confirmed its prior decision to close the charity, following receipt of a letter from the Secretary of State which stated that he would not reverse the termination of government funding to the IFN. The BBC reported, "Communities Minister Felicity Buchan said that while the government would continue supporting other charities that promote interfaith dialogue, they would not change their stance over funding to the IFN".

On 25 February 2024, the Sunday Telegraph reported that the Inter Faith Network was to close "after Michael Gove ended taxpayer funding because of what he called its 'deeply concerning' links to the Muslim Council of Britain (MCB)" and that "the IFN had angered the Department for Levelling Up, Housing and Communities". The newspaper cited a letter to the charity from Gove in which he confirmed he would not give the IFN any further money:

"It is deeply concerning that an MCB member could be appointed into your core governance structure. This increases the proximity between government funding and an organisation (the MCB) with which the Government has a long-standing policy of non-engagement...Interfaith work is hugely valuable but that does not require us to use taxpayers' money in a way that legitimises the influence of organisations such as the MCB".

The Sunday Telegraph article quoted Member of Parliament, Stephen Timms, during a debate in the House of Commons in which he said that it was "extraordinarily stupid to be shutting down at this precise point our principal vehicle in the UK for Muslim-Jewish dialogue”. The newspaper also cited the statement of Member of Parliament, Christopher Chope, in the same debate, "This organisation has had about £2 million in income in the past five years, and three quarters of that income has come from the Government – from the taxpayer. Is not the message for other organisations that they should not be too dependent on taxpayer funding?".

The Church Times quoted a comment by the Church of England's Archbishop of York that the closure of the Inter Faith Network was a "matter of great regret", and that, "Archbishop Cottrell said in a statement on Friday that the closure was a 'sad day for the whole nation'. The work of the IFN had 'helped to bind diverse communities together for many years', he said".

The Independent newspaper reported a statement from a spokesman for the Department for Levelling Up, Housing and Communities: "Interfaith work is hugely important but that does not require us to use taxpayer money in a way that legitimises the influence of organisations such as the MCB. The Inter Faith Network cannot rely on continuous taxpayer funding".

On 30 April 2024, the IFN website and social media accounts reported the final closure of the offices of the Inter Faith Network. On 21 January 2025, the Inter Faith Network for the United Kingdom was dissolved as a company by Companies House. On 11 February 2025 the Inter Faith Network was struck off as a charity by the Charity Commission for England and Wales.

== Re-Founding ==
In January 2025, the Inter Faith Network was re-established under new management by former IFN Trustees, interfaith academics and clergy of different religions, including those who had raised concerns about alleged abuse and malfeasance in the previous organisation. The charitable company limited by guarantee, "The Inter Faith Network for the United Kingdom", was incorporated on 16 January 2025 for the objects of "the promotion of religious harmony for the benefit". On 16 May 2025, the reincorporated Inter Faith Network acquired ownership of the trademarks of the dissolved charity.

On 1 May 2025, the Faith and Belief Forum published the report, "Bursting the Bubble: Recommendations for enhancing Inter Faith Week in England". The Church Times published the findings of the report that "Inter Faith Week must continue in recognition of all that the diversity of faith and belief contributes to public life in the UK, but needs to move 'beyond the bubble' of those already involved"; and the article cited the Minister for Faith, Communities and Resettlement, Lord Khan, "It highlights the urgent need to involve more people from all walks of life and for Inter Faith Week to connect with an even wider audience". The report states, "Following the closure of the Inter Faith Network in Spring 2024, several national interfaith organisations came together in Summer 2024 to form an ad hoc steering group to help ensure that Inter Faith Week could take place in November 2024". The report states that among biggest factors limiting the impact and reach of Inter Faith Week were: "negative public perception of religion, faith and belief", "the 'interfaith bubble', caused by the fact that many of the people involved in Inter Faith Week are already involved in and committed to interfaith work", and "limited institutional support, including from national and local government, national faith and belief organisations".
