= Gonzalo Mazatzin Moctezuma =

Gonzalo Mazatzin Moctezuma, also Don Gonzalo Mazatzin Moctezuma was a Native American warrior, cacique, noble and conquistador for the Spanish crown.

== Early life ==
He was born in a lineage of native nobility. Historians disagree about whether he was the grandson of Moctezuma Xocoyotzin or of Moctezuma Ilhuicamina. His mother was Ilhuicamina Monctezuma. His son, Don Juan de Monctezuma, and his grandson Don Joachin de San Francisco y Moctezuma, both inherited the position of governors of Tepexi de la Seda (modern-day Tepexi de Rodríguez, Puebla, Mexico), and were known by the locals as the lords and rulers of the area. There are indications that he is most likely descended from Moctezuma Ilhuicamina, with a Real Cédula recommending his grandson Don Joachin de San Francisco to the Real Audiencia while naming Don Joachin both the grandson of Gonzalo Moctezuma, and the descendant of Moctezuma I (Moctezuma Ilhuicamina).

== Warrior ==
Moctezuma pledged his allegiance to Spain and assisted Hernan Cortés in his fight against the Mexica.

He remained loyal through his life.

After the Spanish victory he became Governor of Tepexi de la Seda, in modern-day Puebla. He was granted the rank of captain for his military services. He and his descendants are referred as Don/Doña by the Spanish, which indicates that they were considered to have the same status as Spanish nobility.

According to various witnesses, Don Gonzalo–Mazatzin at the time–sent an emissary to find Cortés and offer his vassalage to the king of Spain, along with a gift of gold to prove his good intentions. Cortés, who was in Tepeaca at the time, accepted his pledge. The pair met in Molcaxac where Gonzalo offered Cortés additional gifts.

Cortés granted Gonzalo the title of captain, which gave him the right to conquer in the name of the king, and gave him a Spanish sword and a spear. sealed the deal with a hug, a notable gesture that was uncommon among the natives. Shortly after this encounter Mazatzin converted to Christianity and adopted the Christian name of Gonzalo.

After Cortés' departure, Don Gonzalo sent ambassadors to neighboring provinces announcing his new alliance, which made him "very admired and respected".

As captain he was given the lead in the conquest of Mixteca Alta. He and his soldiers conquered more than ten cities. His grandson implies that he organized and led the native allies.

== Legacy ==
He died around 1525. His title and lands were respected by Spain, and his lineage continued controlling their expanded area for centuries as vassals of the Hispanic Crown.

== Historiography ==
Most of the information about Don Gonzalo comes from a probanza de mérito sent by his grandson, Don Joachim de San Francisco y Moctezuma, to the king of Spain. This was a formal request of new privileges, such as total and permanent tax exemption for his entire city, as a reward for his grandfather's help during the conquest. His testimony is backed by 49 witnesses, 30 of them old enough to have lived through the events. This document, along with documents related to the judicial process that his request underwent, can be found in the Archivo General de Indias of Seville.

Doubts persist about the extent of his service for the Spanish crown. Probanzas de mérito are unreliable as information sources, since their main goal is to persuade the judge to grant a petition. Exaggerations and complete fabrications are common. None of the Spanish conquerors who allegedly met Don Gonzalo refer to him by name or talk about their encounter.

However, the claims made by Don Joachim about the extent of his grandfather's conquests fill a narrative gap regarding the conquest of Puebla and Mixteca Alta left by Spanish accounts. Spaniards may not refer to Don Gonzalo because they had no particular need to do so. Most letters and accounts sent by the conquerors to the king were either aimed at requesting resources or at highlighting their own deeds in order to obtain future favors. Even though they had specific orders of "taking written account of everything they did", this did not extend to taking notice of their native allies. The conquerors mention the help of" large numbers or “Indian-friends" in the conquest of the area. Various pictorial documents suggest the existence of Don Gonzalo's descendants, the position and privileges they had. Their native ascendance is documented.

== Bibliography ==
- Matthew, Laura E.; Oudijk, Michel R., eds. (2007). Indian Conquistadors: Indigenous Allies in the Conquest of Mesoamerica. Norman, OK: University of Oklahoma Press. ISBN 9780806138541.
- Oudijk, Michel; Restall, Matthew (2008). La Conquista Indígena de Mesoamérica: el Caso de Don Gonzalo Mazatzin Moctezuma [The Indigenous Conquest of Mesoamerica: the Case of Don Gonzalo Mazatzin Moctezuma] (in Spanish). Puebla, MX: Universidad de las Américas Puebla; Secretaría de Cultura del Estado de Puebla; Instituto Nacional de Antropología e Historia. ISBN 9786077525004. OCLC 456294759.
- "Real cédula a la Audiencia de México recomendando a Joaquín de San Francisco Moctezuma, cacique y gobernador de Tepexi de la seda, descendiente de Moctezuma I y nieto de Gonzalo Moctezuma" [Royal Decree to the Audiencia of Mexico Recommending Joaquín de San Francisco Moctezuma, Cacique and Governor of Tepexi de la Seda, Descendant of Moctezuma I and Grandson of Gonzalo Moctezuma.]. Archivo General de Indias. Ministry of Culture and Sport. 20 July 1588. Reference number: MEXICO, 1092, L.12, F.123V-124V.
