= British Druid Order =

Religious organisation

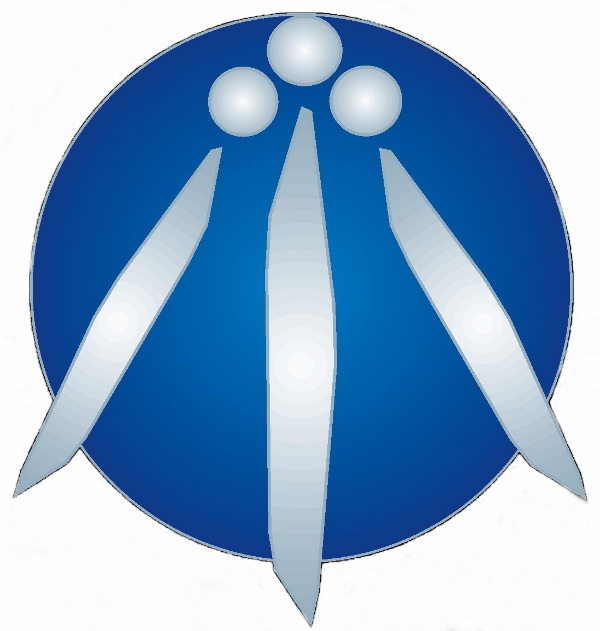
- Awen symbol designed by Greywolf in 2000 as the official logo of the British Druid Order. Awen is the spirit of inspiration and creativity in the British Druid tradition.

Founder
- Philip Shallcrass

Religions
- Contemporary druidry

Languages
- English, Welsh

The British Druid Order (BDO) is an international druid order, founded in 1979 as a religious and educational organisation. Its constitution defines it as a not-for-profit unincorporated association. It is commonly regarded as being one of the first, if not the first, explicitly neo-pagan Druid Orders. The order draws on medieval Welsh texts such as the Mabinogion and other early British/Celtic texts for inspiration and to re-connect with the pre-Christian, indigenous religious and spiritual practices of Britain which it believes to be shamanic in nature.

== History ==
Founded in 1979 with the creation of the original Mother Grove, The Grove of the Badger, in Hastings, Sussex, England, by Philip Shallcrass, the current Chief of the Order.

By 1992, the BDO was publishing and disseminating pagan literature focused on the shamanic traditions of the Islands of Britain.

The Gorsedd of Bards of Caer Abiri was co-founded at Avebury in 1993 by the BDO with ritual designed by Shallcrass

In 1995, Shallcrass was joined by Emma Restall Orr as joint chief of the order.

The first US Gorsedd, Caer Pugetia, was founded in Seattle during a visit to America by the joint chiefs of the Order in 1997 and the Gorsedd of Bards of Cor Gawr founded at Stonehenge as part of the BDO's work to extend ritual access to the site.

In 2002, Restall Orr stepped down as joint chief of the order in order to set up The Druid Network, following which in 2003 the BDO Circle of Elders was formed.

By 2010, the BDO had completed construction of an Iron Age style roundhouse which has since been the focus of training, workshops and ritual for the order. 2011 saw the launch of the BDO's Bardic training, with its first Bards graduating in 2013.

2013 also saw the launch of the Druid Hedge Schools initiative, a loose network of pagan Druid trainings intended to promote Druidry as a spiritual practice in the modern world.

== Principal beliefs ==
The British Druid Order follows the contemporary tradition of neo-druidry with its threefold division of the Order membership into Bards, Ovates and Druids.

BDO Druidry

- is animistic, seeing all things as imbued with spirit,
- is polytheistic, recognising many gods and goddesses,
- venerates ancestors of blood (our direct physical forebears) and of spirit (those who have walked similar spiritual paths before us) and
- venerates Spirit of place.

The order believes that the pre-Christian, indigenous religious and spiritual practices of the original Druids were shamanic in nature, and works to reconstruct such practices in a form as a spiritual system answering to the needs of the 21st century where possible and to reconnect with the spirit of them where not, a process referred to by the BDO as 'rekindling the sacred fire.'

Practically, the British Druid Order seeks to understand and work with the spirit of inspiration and creativity known in the British Druid tradition as 'awen' through study, ritual, folklore, healing and many other practices to facilitate connections to sources of knowledge, inspiration and wisdom beyond the confines of the human psyche and rooted in the natural world. It also sees political and practical activism, in the areas of ecology, as a spiritual obligation.

== Publications ==
The following is a list of publications that the BDO have produced. Tooth and Claw is still published on an occasional basis.

- The Druid's Voice: The Magazine of Contemporary Druidry
- Tooth and Claw: The Journal of the British Druid Order
- Gorseddau: Newsletter of the Gorsedd of Bards of the Isles of Britain

== See also ==
- Magical organization
