= The Druid Network =

British neo-pagan organization

- Founded: February 2003
- Founder: Emma Restall Orr
- Type: Religious Charity
- Purpose: Druidry
- Region served: Officially an English and Welsh charity but with worldwide membership and interests.
- Members: c. 500
- Employees: None
- Volunteers: c. 20
- Website: druidnetwork.org

The Druid Network is a British druidic (neo-pagan) organisation providing a source of information and inspiration about modern Druidic traditions, practices and their histories. It was founded in February 2003 by Emma Restall Orr, and approved as a religious charity in the United Kingdom in 2010.

== Organization ==
The Druid Network was created in 2003 to help its members and those in society understand and practice Druidry as a religion. "Its practitioners revere their deities, most often perceived as the most powerful forces of nature (such as thunder, sun and earth), spirits of place (such as mountains and rivers), and divine guides of a people (such as Brighid, Rhiannon and Bran)." "Although many see them as robed, mysterious people who gather every summer solstice at Stonehenge—which predates the Druids—believers say modern Druidry is chiefly concerned with helping practitioners connect with nature and themselves through rituals, dancing and singing at stone circles and other sites throughout the country believed to be "sacred."

A major project of The Druid Network is called Honouring the Ancient Dead, a programme developed in cooperation with the Manchester Museum (U.K.) for the proper and dignified treatment of human remains at ancient archaeological sites in the United Kingdom.

== Charity status ==
In September 2010, the Charity Commission for England and Wales agreed to register The Network as a charity. This was in response to beliefs that of "nature as a core element of Druidry" that involves worship as "a divine being or entity or spiritual principle." Through this decision, the ancient practices of Druidry that have been embraced in a new manner by has been determined to be a religion, with the result that The Druid Network has been assigned charitable status.

== The Inter Faith Network ==
The Druid Network applied for and was initially rejected for membership in The Inter Faith Network in 2012. Two years of dialogue followed involving a discussion at the House of Lords in November 2012, which involved representatives of some twenty different faiths in a debate which was led by the Reverend Peter Owen Jones and a legal opinion from human rights lawyer John Halford. TDN was eventually admitted to The Inter Faith Network on 29 September 2014 and admitted as a full voting member on 19 October 2016.
