= Emma Restall Orr =

British animist, philosopher, poet, environmentalist, and author

- Other names: Bobcat
- Known for: The Druid Network, Kissing The Hag and Living Druidry

Emma Restall Orr (born 1965) is a British animist, philosopher, poet, environmentalist, and author.

== Career ==
Restall Orr worked for the Order of Bards, Ovates and Druids in the early 1990s, becoming an Ovate tutor. In 1993 she became joint chief of the British Druid Order (BDO), staying until 2002. Together with the Order founder Philip Shallcrass they continued to work on developing the BDO further Following this Restall Orr went on to found The Druid Network in 2002, which was officially launched at Imbolc in 2003.

From the late 1990s Restall Orr organised some of the largest annual gatherings of Druids and those interested in Druidry, at the Avebury Gorsedd and The Awen Camp with Philip Shallcrass, then at The Druid Camp with Mark Graham. In 2004, she founded the organization, Honouring the Ancient Dead. She remains Chair of the Trustees.

She is the author of numerous books on Druidic and pagan spirituality, pagan ritual, poetry and animism, her later books moving away from druidry. Kissing the Hag considers female nature, Living with Honour is an exploration of practical ethics, and The Wakeful World is a metaphysics of modern animism.

In 2006, Restall Orr opened Sun Rising Natural Burial Ground and Nature Reserve (https://sunrising.co.uk) in South Warwickshire. Since 2012, she has moved out of the public eye, focusing on her work with this project. Restall Orr's brother is the historian Matthew Restall and their father is the ornithologist and philatelist Robin Restall.

The closing ceremony of the 2012 Paralympics saw Rory MacKenzie recite parts of a 1997 Gorsedd ritual originally written by Emma Restall Orr and Philip Shallcrass. in a declaration which was witnessed by an estimated audience of around 750 million people.

== Bibliography ==
=== In English ===
- Spirits of the Sacred Grove (Thorsons, 1998) (Reprinted in 2001 as Druid Priestess) ISBN 0-7225-3596-1
- Thorsons Principles of Druidry (Thorsons, 1999) ISBN 0-7225-3674-7
- Ritual: A Guide to Life, Love and Inspiration (Thorsons, 2000) ISBN 0-7225-3970-3
- First Directions – Druidry (Thorsons, 2000) ISBN 0-00-710336-0
- A Druid Director, with Philip Shallcrass (British Druid Order, 2001)
- Druidry: Rekindling the Sacred Fire written with Philip Shallcrass (British Druid Order, 2002)
- Living Druidry: Magical Spirituality for the Wild Soul (Piatkus, 2004) ISBN 0-7499-2497-7
- The Ethics of Paganism: The Value and Power of Sacred Relationship, chapter contributed (Llewellyn, 2005)
- Pagan Visions for a Sustainable Future edited with Ly De Angeles and Thom Van Dooren (Llewellyn, 2005)
- The Apple and the Thorn, with Bill Melnyk (Thoth, 2007)
- Living with Honour: A Pagan Ethics (O Books, April 2008) ISBN 978-184694094-1
- Kissing the Hag: The Dark Goddess and the Unacceptable Nature of Woman (O Books, October 2008)
- The Wakeful World: Animism, Mind and the Self in Nature (Moon Books, November 2012)

=== In languages other than English ===
- Druidismo (Armenia, Milan 1999)
- Druidismo (Hi Brasil, São Paulo 2000)
- Ritual (Hi Brasil, São Paulo 2000)
- Druidenweisheit (Urania, Germany 2001)
