= Paraorchestra =

British orchestra

- Orchestra
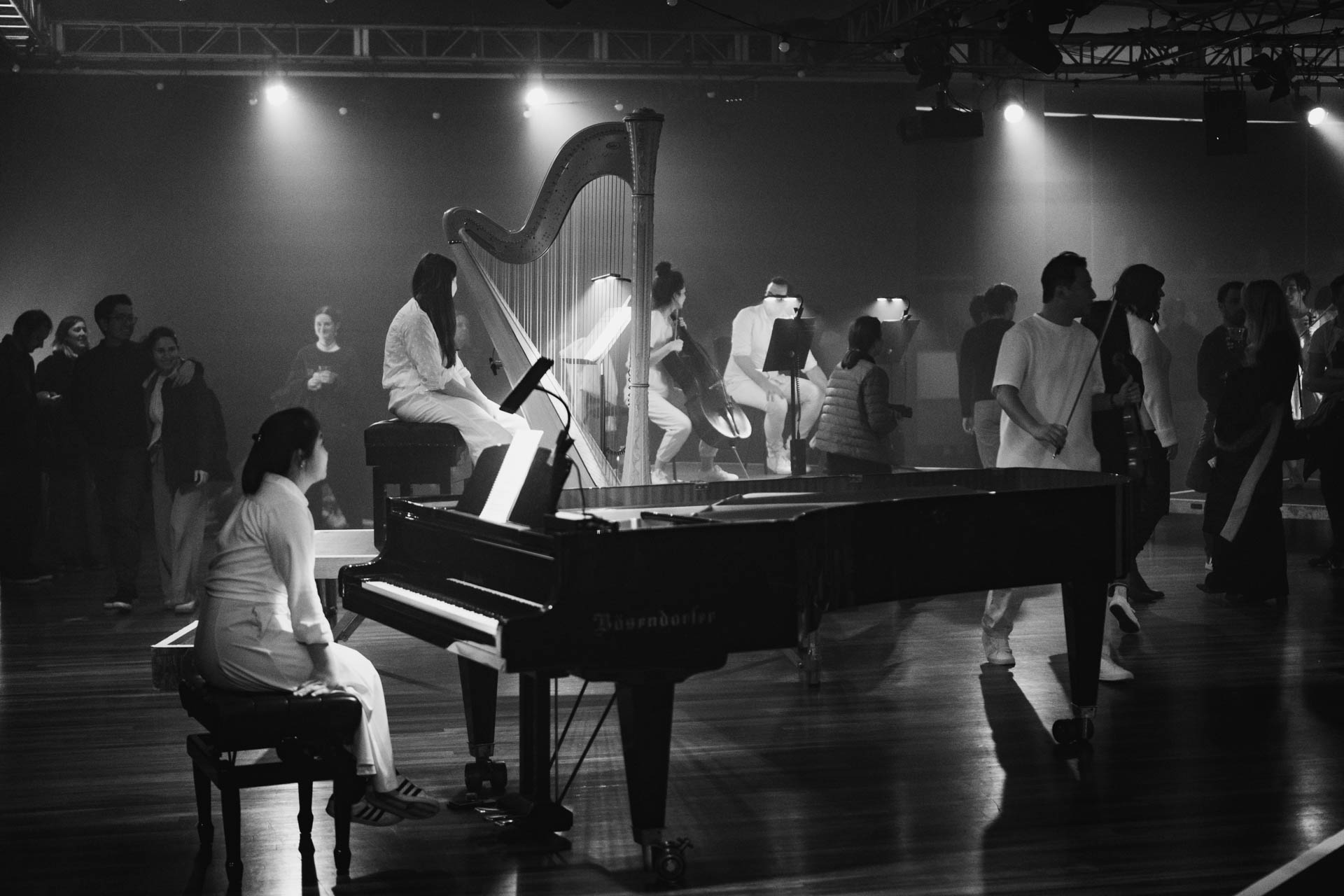
- at the Southbank Centre in 2024
- Founded: 2011
- Location: Bristol, England
- Concert hall: At-Bristol
- Principal conductor: Charles Hazlewood
- Website: paraorchestra.com

Paraorchestra, sometimes referred to as British Paraorchestra, based in Bristol, is an integrated orchestra of professional disabled and non-disabled musicians—the first ever orchestra of its kind in the United Kingdom. The Paraorchestra was formed by conductor Charles Hazlewood in 2011 as a project to create a platform for the top disabled musicians, with the hope that its success would lead to better integration of disabled people into music and performing arts.

The orchestra performed its first live show at Glastonbury Abbey in July 2012 (which was also the subject of a Channel 4 documentary), and received international attention when it played alongside Coldplay during the closing ceremony of the 2012 Summer Paralympics in London in September 2012.

== History ==
=== Origins ===
Charles Hazlewood was inspired by his youngest daughter Eliza to form the Paraorchestra; Eliza has cerebral palsy, but Hazlewood believed that she was still an "outstanding" singer. Being the father of a child with a disability, he realized that throughout his career as an orchestral conductor, he had seen few disabled performers as members of orchestras. Hazlewood felt that since music is "universal", an orchestra should represent all members of a community—comparing this ordeal to the time when only men performed in orchestras. He felt that an orchestra consisting only of disabled performers could spread awareness of this issue and help achieve greater integration for disabled people in music and the performing arts.

=== Formation ===
Hazlewood officially announced the formation of the Paraorchestra in July 2011 at a TED conference in Edinburgh. He did not intend the Paraorchestra to be a therapeutic or "warm and fuzzy" project, but rather a platform to showcase disabled musicians with virtuosic qualities. When holding auditions, he aimed to find musicians who were "at the top of their game, technically, and with a spirit behind the virtuosity." The orchestra's first 17 members come from a variety of backgrounds and use a variety of instruments, including conventional instruments and electronic devices such as tablet computers and other assistive technology developed by Rolf Gehlhaar, Professor in Experimental Music at Coventry University and the technical director of the orchestra. After failing to partner with the BBC, Hazlewood successfully commissioned British broadcaster Channel 4 to produce a documentary following the formation of the Paraorchestra and its first performance, which aired on 9 September 2012. He felt airing its documentary on Channel 4 was a "no-brainer", as it was also the official broadcaster of the 2012 Summer Paralympics.

The Paraorchestra made its first public appearance on 1 July 2012 during Hazlewood's music festival "Orchestra in a Field" at Glastonbury Abbey; the performance included its versions of "Greensleeves" and Maurice Ravel's Boléro. The orchestra's style incorporates a large amount of improvisation, intended to allow the orchestra to feel a sense of "collective ownership" of their performances.

=== Involvement with the Paralympics ===
In 2012, Hazlewood campaigned for the Paraorchestra to be included in the ceremonies of the 2012 Summer Paralympics in London. He felt that their inclusion in this international event would be a unique opportunity for the Paraorchestra and that it could also raise awareness of his cause. The Paraorchestra were ultimately incorporated into the closing ceremony of the Games, where it performed alongside British rock band Coldplay (accompanying them in a performance of "Strawberry Swing"), and played the Paralympic anthem.

On 3 December 2012, coinciding with the United Nations' International Day of Persons with Disabilities, the British Paraorchestra released a cover of "True Colors" as a charity single, in a campaign to be Christmas number one. Accompanied by the Kaos Signing Choir for Deaf and Hearing Children and notable Britiah paralympians, the single was released to support the British Paralympic Association in preparation for the 2014 Winter Paralympics, along with the Paraorchestra and Kaos Signing Choir themselves. The Paraorchestra was awarded a Big Society Award in September 2013.

In 2022 they collaborated with the Irish composer Hannah Peel and that resulted in an album titled: The Unfolding, featuring the soprano Victoria Otuwari.

== Members ==
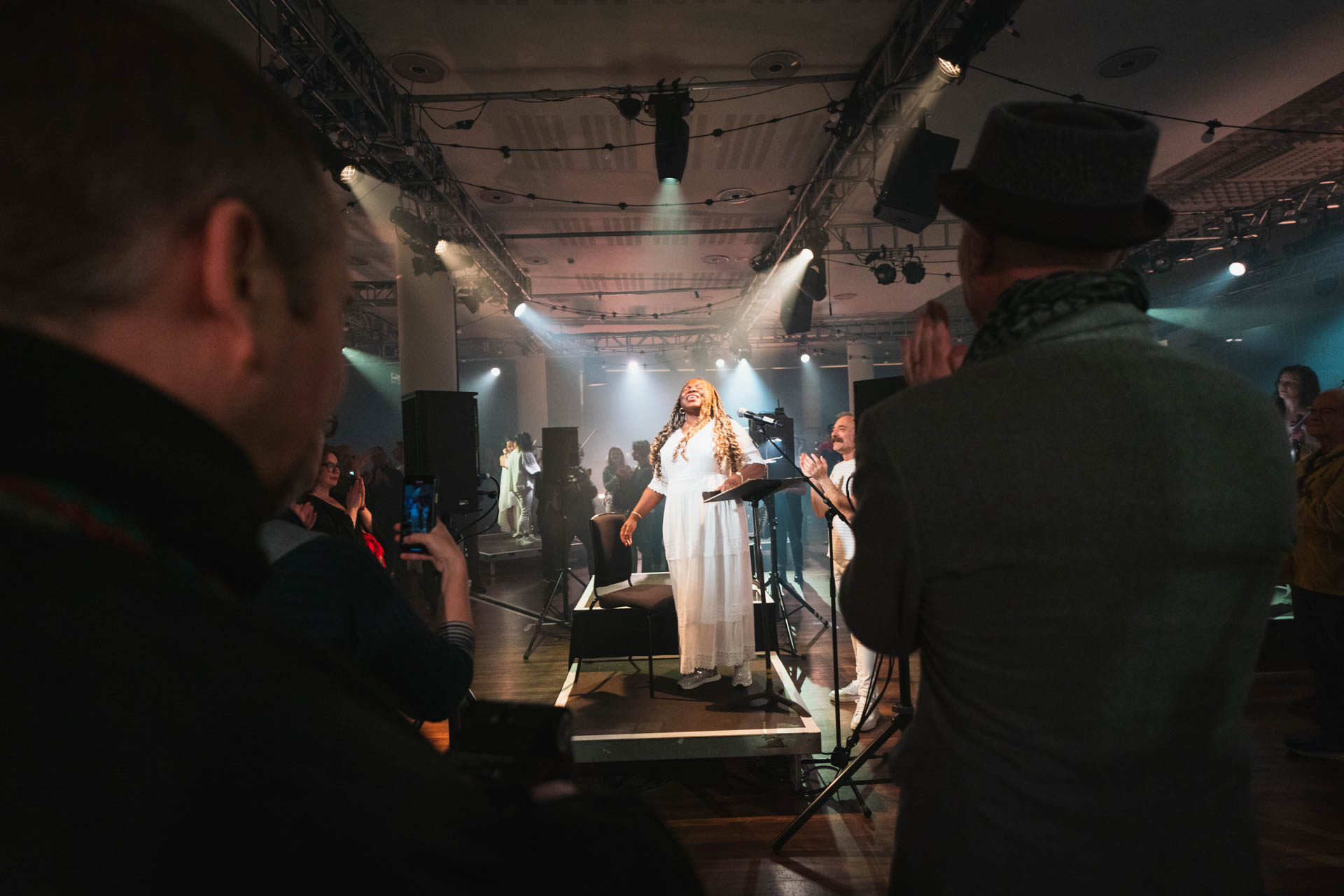
Victoria Oruwari and the Paraorchestra at Southbank Centre in 2024

The Paraorchestra began with 17 members. Its founder members in 2012 included Nicholas McCarthy, a one-handed pianist who was a recent graduate from the Royal College of Music, Clarence Adoo, a former jazz trumpet player who was paralysed below the shoulders after a car accident in 1995 (and who played an instrument known as "Headspace", which is controlled by breath and head motions, developed for him by Rolf Gehlhaar), Gemma Lunt, a viola player who uses a wheelchair and Lyn Levett, who uses a Macintosh to play what Hazlewood feels is "dizzyingly creative" electronic music. Blind members of the Paraorchestra in 2012 included pianist and violinist Abi Baker, James Risdon on recorder, Matthew Wadsworth on the lute, violist Takashi Kikuchi, and multi-instrumentalists Baluji Shrivastav and Ziad Sinno. In 2012 the Paraorchestra added 15-year-old hearing-impaired viola player Tilly Chester to its lineup. Hazlewood had encountered her playing with the National Youth Orchestra—of which she was also a member.

== See also ==
- Disability in the arts
