= Seven Myths of the Spanish Conquest =

Book by Matthew Restall

- Cover of the 2003 OUP hardback edition. The design shows a photo reproduction of two portions of the late 17thC painting El encuentro de Cortés y Moctezuma, attributed to Juan Correa, held in the collection of the Banco de México
- Author: Matthew Restall
- Cover artist: Mary Belibasakis (jacket design)
- Publisher: Oxford University Press
- Publication date: 2003
- Media type: Print hbk (2003), pbk (2004)
- Pages: xix, 218pp.: ill., 1 map.
- ISBN: 0-19-516077-0
- OCLC: 51022823
- Dewey Decimal: 980/.013/072 21
- LC Class: F1230 .R47 2003

Seven Myths of the Spanish Conquest is a 2003 work by ethnohistorian Matthew Restall in which he posits that there are seven myths about the Spanish colonization of the Americas that have come to be widely believed to be true. Working within the tradition of New Philology, Restall questions several notions which he claims are widely held myths about how the Spanish achieved military and cultural hegemony in Hispanic America. The book grew from undergraduate lectures at Penn State University. The book has been published in Spanish and Portuguese translations.

== Chapters ==
- Chapter 1 deals with what Restall calls "the Myth of exceptional men" — the idea that the Spanish Conquest was enabled by certain outstanding individuals such as Columbus, Cortés, and Pizarro and their personal courage and innovative strategies. The myth of Columbus developed in North America in the 1800s, when historians generated interest in Columbus among readers. Over time, the celebration of Columbus grew into Columbus Day, and the truth of his journey, that he had lied to the Queen of Spain about his Route and ended up being stripped of his title and banned from the Indies, was buried. The glorification of Cortes resulted from his success in Mexico and the publication of his letters to the King. Additionally, many of Cortes's associates wrote biographies on him that portrayed him as a larger-than-life character, contributing to his glorification. Restall shows that the success of the conquest was not due to these few exceptional men, but that the techniques of conquest and colonization used by the early Spanish explorers had been developed throughout at least a century of colonial expansion by Spain and Portugal and were in fact mostly standard procedure. These techniques of conquest include acquiring a native ally and interpreter, the use of display violence, and the public seizure of a native ruler. Restall draws on scholars' published work for this conclusion.
- Chapter 2 deals with what Restall calls "the Myth of the King's Army" — the belief that the Spanish conquest was undertaken at the behest of the King of Spain and that the conquistadors were Spanish soldiers. Restall claims that in fact the conquistadors did not necessarily see themselves as Spanish but rather viewed themselves as Andalusians, Castilians, Aragonese, Basques, Portuguese, Galicians, and even Genoese, Flemish, Greek, and Moorish. Nor were they acting under the command of the Holy Roman Emperor who was also the king of the Spanish realms. And they were not soldiers in a formal military sense of the word but rather a group of feudal lords with their respective footmen, servants, pages, and mercenaries. These groups acted independently with their own agendas. Spanish military technology is also greatly exaggerated as, at the time of the conquest, the musket had yet to be invented and regularly used, along with several other significant military inventions that would occur in the later half of the sixteenth century.
- Chapter 3 deals with what Restall calls "the Myth of the White Conquistador" — the belief that the Spanish conquest was accomplished by a small number of Spaniards. Restall claims that much of the actual military operations were undertaken by the indigenous allies of the Conquistadors (such as the Tlaxcalans), outnumbering the actual Spanish forces by many hundreds to one. When Cortés made his way to Tenochtitlán, the Aztec capital, he arrived with 6,000 of these allies and only 250 Spaniards. The final assault on the capital was carried out with 200,000 native allies, most of whom have gone unrecognized in accounts. He also shows that there were several conquistadors of African and Moorish descent — dispelling the idea of the conquest as a victory of the "white Europeans" over the "red Indians". The number of people of African descent, free or enslaved, equaled or exceeded the Spanish conquistadors in number. These groups are almost completely left out of accounts of the Spanish conquest although they played a massive part. Restall hypothesises that the Spaniards motivated the Africans to fight by offering freedom if their contribution to the conquest were impactful.
- Chapter 4 deals with what Restall calls "the Myth of Completion" — the belief that all of the Americas were under Spanish control within a few years after the initial contact. The Spaniards created this myth to support the Spanish system of patronage, contact, and reward, and to justify the conquest as divine intervention. Restall claims that contrary to this belief pockets of indigenous peoples living without having been conquered subsisted for several centuries after the conquest - and arguably to this day. For example, Tayasal, the last independent city of the Maya, did not fall under Spanish sway until 1697. In other areas of Hispanic America, Spanish control was never complete and rebellions were continuous. He shows that the colonization of the Americas did not happen in one fell swoop, but rather as a historical process starting centuries before the magic years of 1492 and 1521 and ending several centuries after. With lots of evidence to the contrary of Spanish completion of the America's, Mexican descendants were left with an identity crisis, divided over the issue of recognizing Cortés as a hero or the last rulers of Mexica as the heroes. An aspect of this myth that is left out in accounts is the level of autonomy granted to Natives after the conquests. The Spanish wished to let Native communities self-govern to produce agriculture as the Spanish settlers were not farmers and were dependent on the work of the Natives. Therefore, there was a level of cooperation between the two groups, not total control of the Natives by the Spanish. This myth also overlooks the everyday resistance by the natives.
- Chapter 5 deals with what Restall calls "The Myth of (Mis)Communication" — the beliefs that the Spaniards and natives had perfect communication and that each group understood the other's words and intentions unhindered, or alternatively that many of the crucial events of the conquest were a result of the two groups misunderstanding each other's intentions. Restall claims that communication between the groups were in fact very difficult at first, and that the rendering of passages of speech made by one group to the other in post-conquest sources cannot be understood as having been recorded "verbatim" even though it is understood and interpreted that way. But he also shows that the natives cannot be said to have crucially misunderstood or misinterpreted the Spaniards' intentions, but rather that they had a good understanding of how the Spanish worked at a very early stage in the conquest. Cortés in his account of his conquest of the Aztec Empire makes no mention of an interpreter, as if he and the Natives spoke the same language. Of course the well known La Malince (Doña Marina or Malintzin) was present as Cortés interpreter and is mentioned in other accounts of the matter by people such as Bernal Díaz and Francisco López de Gómara. However La Malinche and other interpreters are mentioned sparingly and still disregarded in these accounts. In failing to mention the use of a translator when meeting the Aztec ruler, Cortes & several historical sources neglect the possibility of misinterpretation and miscommunication between both parties. Further, in failing to mention the use of a translator, Cortes appears to make the conquistadores seem more powerful and independent. According to Restall (86)"The tendency to ignore or dismiss interpreter roles is thus a corollary to the myths discussed in Chapters 3 and 4, whereby Spaniards complete the Conquest rapidly and alone."
- Chapter 6 deals with what Restall calls "The Myth of Native Desolation" — the belief that the indigenous peoples of the Americas resigned to their fate, included themselves in the new European order and ceased to exist as ethnicities. This myth began due to historical accounts from Felipe Huaman, a descendant of the Incan Imperial dynasty who argued against Spanish colonization. Huaman specifically wrote, "There is no remedy, and the Indians are coming to an end." (1615), emphasizing the severe nature of the Spanish colonization. Since then, historians have used these Native narratives to discuss the effects of the conquest on Native culture, leading to the myth that the Native population and culture were destroyed and left desolate by the Spanish conquest. He also argues that many of the indigenous peoples never felt "conquered" but rather that they had formed a partnership with a new power to both of their advantage - this for example was the case for most of the allied forces that helped Cortés defeat the Aztecs. In attempting to demonstrate the conquistadors' reliance on natives and the partnership between the two groups, Restall highlights the role of disease in native depopulation and thus diminishes the role of Spanish killings. He finds that the decline in native populations was “not a holocaust in the sense of being the product of genocide campaign or a deliberate attempt to exterminate a population,” and native populations had been in decline “even preceding” European entrance into the indies. While Restall acknowledges a population decrease due to disease, he does not believe that native cultures and social structures were deliberately desolated as a result. In fact, he finds that the population decline and intense Spanish colonial dependence provided opportunities for native survivors. This serves to demonstrate the importance of native social structures/cultures for the Spanish and thus discredit the idea that native populations resigned to a certain “fate.” A key part of this myth was also the apotheosis myth: the idea that the Natives believed the Europeans to be gods. Columbus in his writings stated that the natives "are credulous and aware that there is a God in heaven and convinced that we come from the heavens." He believed the gifts of food and drink given by the Natives were "offerings" but there is no evidence of this and it makes more sense that these gifts were simply kind gestures of friendship to the newcomers. Furthermore, this connects with the next myth of superiority where the Spanish felt as if their conquests were the order of God. This further connects to the American idea of Manifest Destiny during Western expansion. The two groups felt as if they had a divine reason to do what they did although there is no evidence behind this or what is to follow in the next chapter.
- Chapter 7 deals with what Restall calls "The Myth of Superiority" — the belief that the success of the Spanish conquest was due to either the supposed technological superiority of the Spaniards or a kind of inherent cultural superiority — and that Spanish victory was therefore inevitable. Restall claims that such technological advantages as handguns, cannons, steel armor, horses, and dogs were not of great consequence in the actual fighting since they were all in short supply, and that the Aztecs were not daunted by this new technology for long. He also refutes the notion that the natives' lack of alphabetic writing constituted a major drawback. Nor were the natives childlike, naive or cowardly in comparison with the Spanish such as many early Spanish sources have painted them. Restall argues that the factors behind the success of the conquistadors were mostly the devastating effect of European diseases for which the natives had no resistance; the disunity between indigenous groups, some of which allied with the Spaniards early; the technological advantage of the steel sword; native battle practices that were not upheld by the Spaniards — such as killing non-combatants and civilians; and most importantly, the fact that the natives were fighting on their own ground with their families and fields to care for, which made them quicker to compromise.

== Editions ==
Seven Myths of the Spanish Conquest was first published 2003 in cloth (hardcover) edition by OUP, with a paperback edition released the following year. A Spanish-language edition (under the title Los siete mitos de la conquista española) was published by Paidós, with imprints issued in Spain (Barcelona, November 2004) and Mexico (2005).

- Restall, Matthew (2003). Seven Myths of the Spanish Conquest (hardcover ed.). Oxford and New York: Oxford University Press. ISBN 0-19-516077-0. OCLC 51022823.
- Matthew Restall. (2004). Seven Myths of the Spanish Conquest (paperback ed.). Oxford and New York: Oxford University Press. ISBN 0-19-517611-1. OCLC 56695639.
- Restall, Matthew (2004). Los siete mitos de la conquista española. Colección Origenes, #46 (in Spanish). Marta Pino Moreno (trans.) (Spanish translation (pbk)n. ed.). Barcelona: Ediciones Paidós Ibérica. ISBN 978-84-493-1638-8. OCLC 57548002.
- Restall, Matthew (2005). Los siete mitos de la conquista española. Colección Origenes, #46 (in Spanish). Translated by Pino, Marta (Spanish translation (pbk)n. ed.). México D.F.: Ediciones Paidós Ibérica. ISBN 968-853-587-7. OCLC 60677553.

== Bibliography ==
- Bakewell, Peter (January 2005). "Book Review: Seven Myths of the Spanish Conquest". European History Quarterly. 35. London: SAGE Publications: 162–165. doi:10.1177/026569140503500123. OCLC 42441430. S2CID 145599467.
- Burnham, Philip (August 4, 2004) [updated September 12, 2018]. Written at Washington. "'Seven Myths of the Spanish Conquest' by Matthew Restall". Indian Country Today. Vol. 24, no. 8. Oneida, NY: Today Media Network. p. D5. ISSN 1066-5501. OCLC 61312883. ProQuest 362603931.
- Constantino, María (2006-09-05). "Magna exposición sobre la presencia de los indígenas en el arte novohispano". Imágenes: Revista electrónica del Instituto de Investigaciones Estéticas (in Spanish). Coyoacán, México, D.F.: UNAM, Instituto de Investigaciones Estéticas.
- Hoffman, Paul E. (Winter 2007). "Los siete mitos de la conquista española". Ethnohistory. 54 (1). Durham, NC: Duke University Press, issued by the American Society for Ethnohistory: 206–207. doi:10.1215/00141801-2006-051. OCLC 42388116.
- Karttunen, Frances (2005). "Nahuatl for the Twenty-First Century". Ethnohistory. 52 (2). Durham, NC: Duke University Press, issued by the American Society for Ethnohistory: 449–477. doi:10.1215/00141801-52-2-449. OCLC 42388116.
- Mortellaro, Itzel Rodríguez (n.d.). "De la Colonia: El encuentro entre Hernán Cortés y Moctezuma Xocoyotzin". Historias Mexicanas (in Spanish). SEPiensa, Instituto Latinoamericano de la Comunicación Educativa. Archived from the original on 2008-02-11.
- Restall, Matthew (2003). Seven Myths of the Spanish Conquest. Oxford and New York: Oxford University Press. ISBN 0-19-516077-0. OCLC 51022823.
- Schwaller, John F. (2004). "Matthew Restall. Seven Myths of the Spanish Conquest". American Historical Review. 109 (4). Washington, DC: American Historical Association: 1271–1272. doi:10.1086/530842. OCLC 99707768. Archived from the original (Reviews of Books and Films - Caribbean and Latin America) on 2008-01-29.
