= 2012 Summer Paralympics closing ceremony =

- Part of 2012 Summer Paralympics
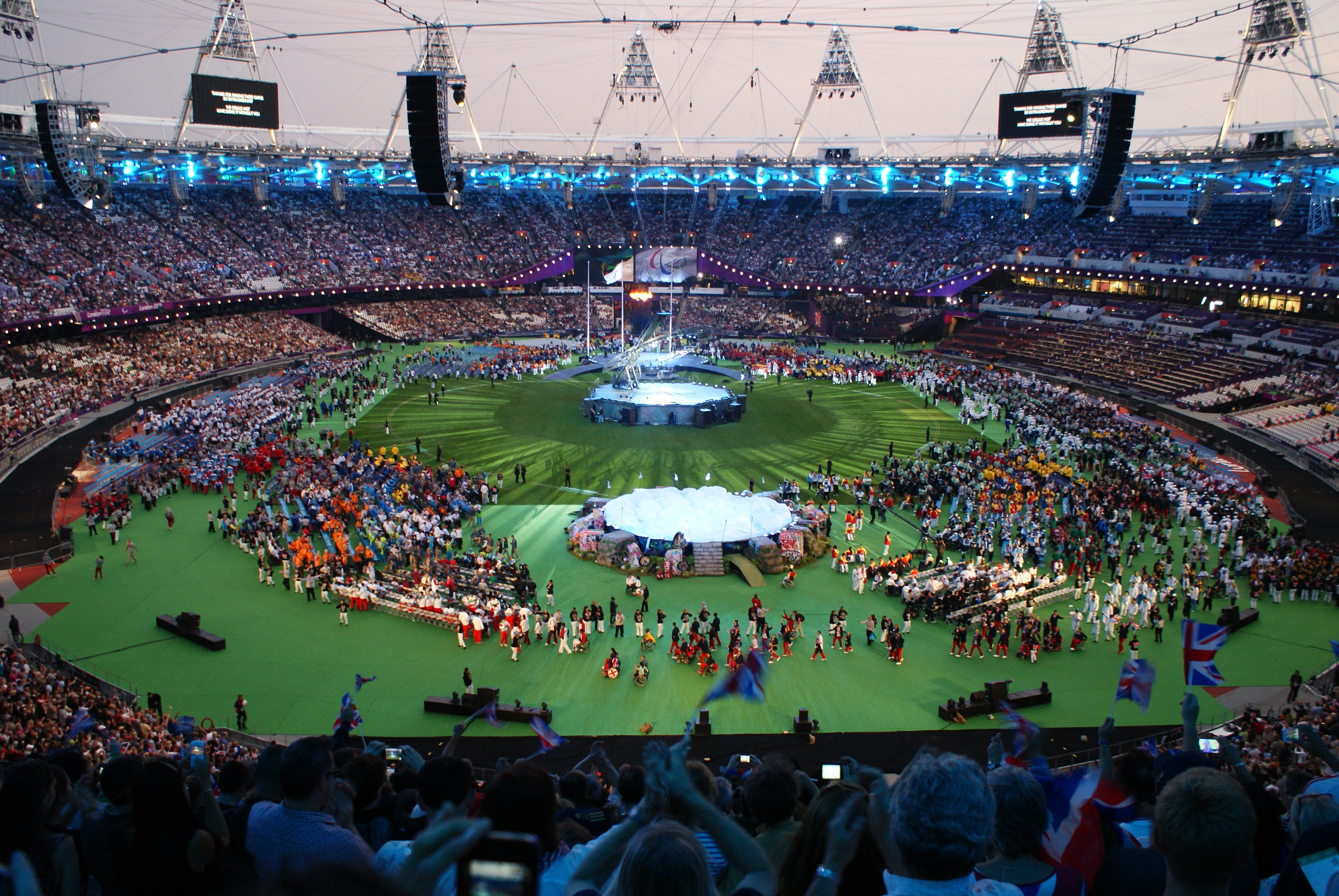
- Athletes gather inside Olympic Stadium prior to the start of the closing ceremony
- Date: 20:30, 9 September 2012 (+01:00)
- Venue: Olympic Stadium
- Location: London, England; 51°32′19″N 0°01′00″W
- Also known as: Festival of the Flame
- Filmed by: Olympic Broadcasting Services (OBS)

The closing ceremony of the 2012 Summer Paralympics, also known as the Festival of the Flame, was held on 9 September at the Olympic Stadium in London. Kim Gavin (who also directed the closing ceremony of the 2012 Summer Olympics) served as director for the ceremony, while Stephen Daldry served as its executive producer. The ceremony was themed around festivals and the four seasons, with the artistic programme being set to performances by British band Coldplay. The band were joined by guests such as the British Paraorchestra, Rihanna, and Jay-Z.

In a formal handover ceremony, the Paralympic flag was passed from Boris Johnson, Mayor of London, to Eduardo Paes, Mayor of Rio de Janeiro, the host city of the 2016 Summer Paralympics. During his closing speech, International Paralympic Committee president Philip Craven congratulated London for hosting "the greatest Paralympic Games ever." Following the official closure of the Games, the Paralympic cauldron was extinguished by swimmer Eleanor Simmonds and sprinter Jonnie Peacock.

== Production ==
Kim Gavin, who also directed the closing ceremony of the Summer Olympics just a few weeks prior, would serve as the director for the ceremony. The ceremony's overlying theme was the gathering of people in celebration, honouring the many seasonal festivals that have been held throughout Great Britain's history. Coldplay's lead singer Chris Martin was enthusiastic about his band's prominent role in the closing ceremony, and promised that their act would "close London 2012 in style." Both Gavin and executive producer Stephen Daldry contended that the closing ceremony would not just simply be a Coldplay concert, promising "fantastic visuals and amazing stunts" throughout.

Charles Hazlewood's British Paraorchestra (a 17-piece orchestra of musicians with disabilities—the first of its kind in the United Kingdom), made appearances during the closing ceremony; performing alongside Coldplay and also performing the Paralympic anthem. Hazlewood campaigned for the Paraorchestra to be included in the ceremonies of the Paralympics, as he felt that their inclusion could help spread international awareness for disabled musicians.

== Performance synopsis ==
=== Pre-show ===
The Dreamers' whimsical musical vehicles

In order for all the athletes to enjoy the show in its entirety, all athletes entered the stadium together before the start of the ceremony to take their seats. A group of silver-coloured "dreamers" then took to the field on a set of pedal-powered vehicles that doubled up as musical instruments. Some of the dreamers kept falling asleep, but they eventually managed to inflate three crescent moons which were lifted from the ground and suspended, forming the Agitos. None of the pre-show was broadcast on television. The Dreamers remained on the field, asleep until the official start of the closing ceremony.

=== Windstorm ===
The closing ceremony opened with a film called "The Book of Fire" by director Mike Christie showing "eccentric travellers" from around the city making their way to the Olympic Stadium in steampunk-inspired vehicles prepared by the performance art group Mutoid Waste Company. At the end of the film, a group of Wind Gremlins drove into the stadium on custom-built motorbikes with huge fans on the front. The wind awakened the Dreamers from their sleep, and they struggled to fend off the Gremlins' attack while keeping the Agitos in place. In the end the Dreamers were unable to hold on, and the Agitos float away with one of the Dreamers still clinging on to them. At that point, performers carrying flares entered the field of play to the rescue of the Dreamers.

=== Raising of the flag ===
A horse-like vehicle entered and was followed by the Human Endeavour machine pulled by a team from Help for Heroes. When the team reached the sundial stage a flagpole was erected with the combined effort of the men from the team. Captain Luke Sinnott (who lost both of his legs and an arm in an explosion on-duty in Helmand, Afghanistan, and aimed to compete in sailing at the 2016 Summer Paralympics) proceeded to climb the pole (representing human endeavour) to fly the Union Flag. At the same time 54 drummers carrying flaming poles on their backs marched onto the field to form the Agitos. Just as Sinnott reached the top of the flag pole, Prince Edward and International Paralympic Committee (IPC) president Philip Craven were driven through the Agitos on the field in an art car built from the body of a military vehicle and a 1930s automobile. Blind and autistic singer Lissa Hermans performed the British national anthem "God Save the Queen" (which she also performed as a charity single for the Diamond Jubilee of Elizabeth II).

=== The Heart of Many Nations ===
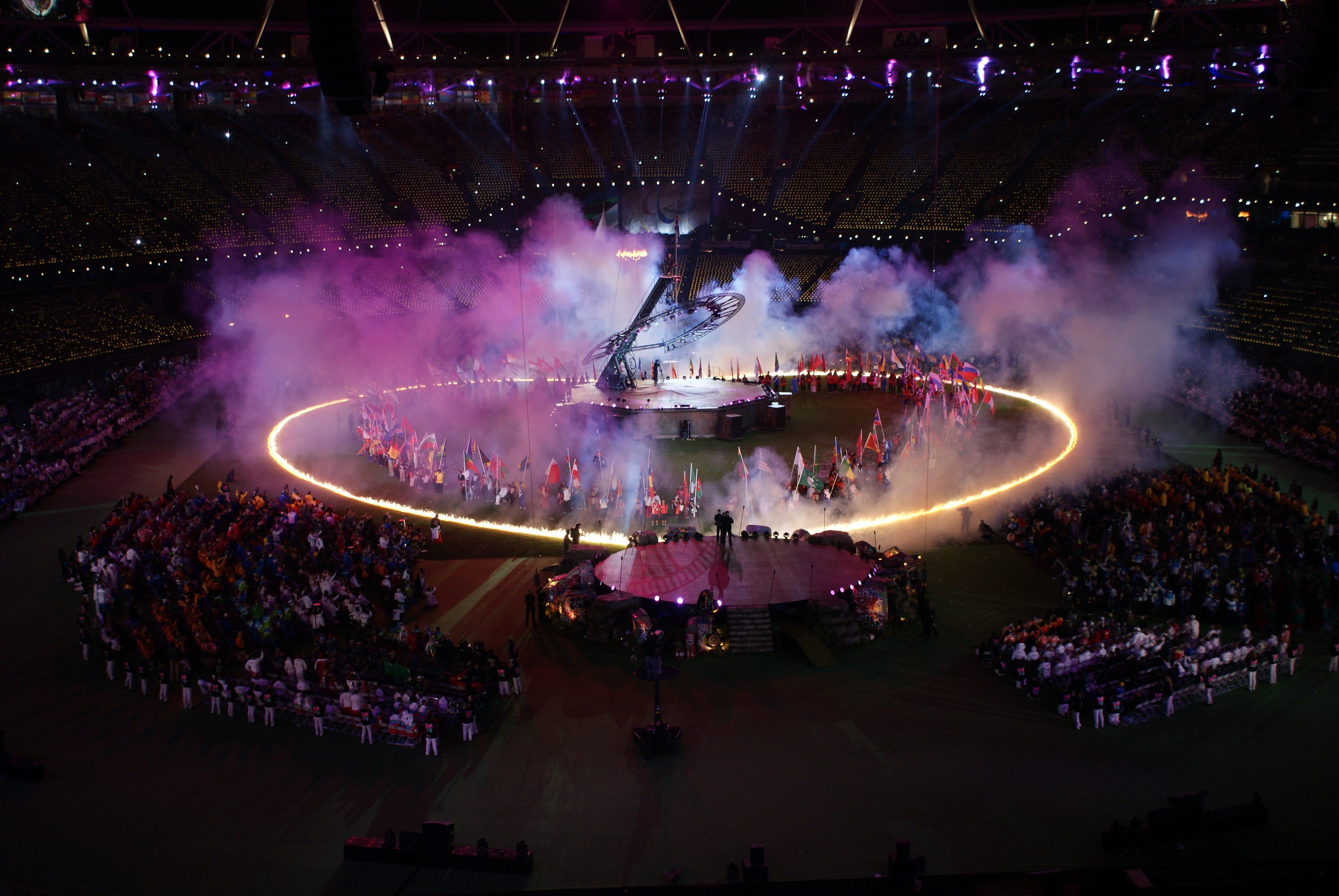
Flags of the nations in a heart shape.

After climbing the steps to the top of the sundial stage in the centre, the Reader, played by Lance Corporal Rory MacKenzie, addressed the stadium with a speech introducing the theme of the ceremony's cultural presentation, "Festival of the Flame". His speech was followed by the entrance of the flags of participating nations. At the end of the procession, the flagbearers were in formation in the shape of a heart, and pyrotechnics outlined their shape on the field.

=== Truck Invasion ===
The Reader then read a text taken from a modern druidic ritual written by members of the British Druid Order, calling upon the spirits of the four seasons. After he announced the commencement of the festival, a squad armed with backpack flamethrowers walked onto the field burning patterns similar to crop circles into the grass. At the same time the trucks and travellers previously seen in the opening film entered the stadium, forming a procession consisting of ships, a Clocks truck, creatures like a fish and a grasshopper, and crows on stilts. The truck invasion ended with all trucks and performers assembled around the central sundial stage.

=== Spirit of the Games ===
This section began with the awarding of the Whang Youn Dai Achievement Award to Mary Nakhumicha Zakayo of Kenya and Michael McKillop of Ireland. Zakayo competed in discus, javelin and shot put T57-58. McKillop won gold medals in the 800m T37 and 1500m T37. After this, the six newly elected members of the IPC Athlete's Council; Arnaud Assoumani (Athletics, France), Gizem Girismen, (Para–Archery, Turkey), Jon McCullough (7–a–side Football, United States of America), Teresa Perales (Swimming, Spain), Elvira Stinissen (Sitting Volleyball, Netherlands), Yu Chui Yee (Wheelchair Fencing, Hong Kong) were introduced to the stadium. These six represented all athletes and the IPC in thanking the volunteers of the London 2012 Paralympic Games by presenting flowers to volunteer representatives.

=== Festival of the Flame ===
The Festival of the Flame kicked off properly as a live concert by Coldplay followed. Coldplay performed from the sundial stage, and performances were broadly categorised into the four seasons, beginning with Autumn and finishing with Summer.

==== Autumn ====
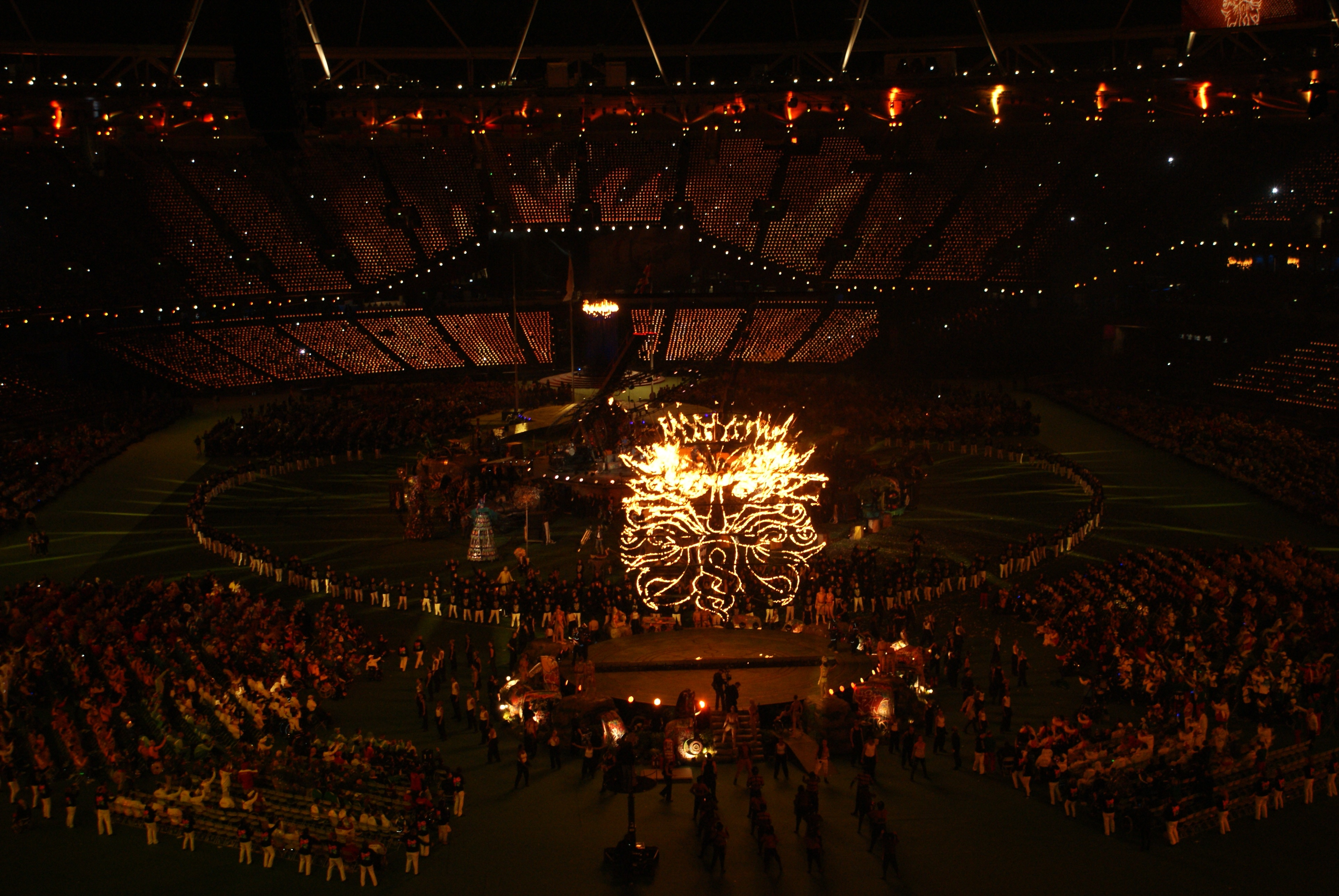
The Sun God rises in the stadium.

Coldplay began the set with "Us Against The World", as performers crowded around the stage signed the lyrics to the song. They then followed it with "Yellow", one of the band's first singles, while dancers from the Candoco Dance Company danced on the North Stage and a flaming mask of the Sun King rose from it, signifying the end of the harvest season. Coldplay next sang "Up in Flames", with aerial artistes Lyndsay Care (who has cerebral palsy) and Denis Remnev performing a strap act on the Clocks truck. The band closed the Autumn segment with "Paradise"; 19 aerialists attached to lightbulbs floated from the top down to the field, symbolising fireflies which mark the end of Autumn.

==== Winter ====
The short Winter segment was soundtracked by Coldplay's "42". 6 warrior skaters holding flaming torches skated around the Snow Queen (played by Viktoria Modesta) on the South Stage, frozen in her cage. Slowly the skaters melted the "ice" and removed the bars on her cage, releasing the Queen. The Snow Queen was inspired by the White Queens from C. S. Lewis' popular series The Chronicles of Narnia. Green lights then filled the stadium, replacing the chilly blue of Winter and signalling the impending arrival of Spring. Coldplay performed "God Put a Smile upon Your Face" with guest drummer Mat Fraser, who was born with phocomelia of both arms.

==== Spring ====
Spring opened with a performance of "Clocks" featuring a laser show and poi jugglers from Feeding the Fish performing with their unique Pixel-Poi light batons which projected images whilst spinning through the air. The stadium lit up with Xylobands, special LED wristbands given to all athletes in the field of play which lit up in time to the music. These were the same type of wristbands given to audience members of Coldplay's Mylo Xyloto Tour. During the next song "Charlie Brown", 120 children carrying 600 car hub caps ran towards the Fish truck in the field of play and hung the caps, painted to represent fish scales, on the fish skeleton. Rihanna arrived on the Ship truck to perform "Princess of China", her collaboration with Coldplay.

==== Summer ====
Coldplay frontman Chris Martin introduced the British Paraorchestra who performed a short instrumental intro leading into "Strawberry Swing", while dancers behind the orchestra danced their way into the Summer segment. After that song, Rihanna made her second appearance, singing "We Found Love" whilst suspended on a metal bench over the dancers and performers rode carousel horses suspended in the air. Coldplay concluded this segment of the ceremony with a performance of "Viva la Vida". The Summer dancers and Candoco Dance Company danced on the two stages as other performers joined in the revelry. The main concert segment finished with Chris Martin leading the stadium in a big sing-along from the top of the sundial.

=== Alô Rio ===
The Paralympic flag was formally lowered by three members of the Ministry of Defence, while the British Paraorchestra performed the Paralympic anthem. The flag was then passed from the hands of the Mayor of London Boris Johnson to that of IPC president Philip Craven, who in turn formally handed the flag to Eduardo Paes, mayor of Rio de Janeiro, the next host city in 2016.

=== Joy ===
The handover was followed by a cultural presentation by Rio entitled "Joy". Set to music performed by Thalma de Freitas, Paralamas do Sucesso and Carlinhos Brown, it featured disabled and able-bodied dancers competing in Rio's traditional dances battles (called "batalha do passinho") that incorporated a combination of hip-hop with traditional and popular Brazilian dances. The presentation ended with fireworks.

=== The Final Flame ===
The presentation was followed by speeches from LOCOG chairman Sebastian Coe and Sir Philip Craven. Coe stated that we had our minds opened to what people can do and achieve by sheer talent and determination. Coe paid tribute to the volunteers of the games by recalling two stories of people he had met. The first was during a journey on the tube where he met Andrew, a Games Maker, which Coe branded among the heroes of London 2012, who is a doctor at St Mary's hospital whilst on his way to helping out at the boxing. When Coe tried to thank him for all his help, Andrew said that it is Coe who should be thanked. Andrew suddenly said that he had was on duty during the London bombings for him this is closure. Andrew wasn't sure that he should come but was glad he did, as he had seen the worst of mankind and now he had seen the best of mankind. A few days later Coe met Emily at the Paralympic Games, who said that it has lifted the cloud of limitation. Coe then stated to Andrew and Emily that he was going to have the last word and thanked them and all the volunteers, which drew a standing ovation from the crowd. Continuing Coe stated that the games led the public to not think about sport or disability the same way again, and agreeing with Emily that the cloud has been lifted. Coe felt that London's high quality organisation of the Olympics and Paralympics were worthy enough of being labelled "Made in Britain."

Craven hailed the Games as simply amazing. Continuing Craven noted that the Beijing Closing Ceremony theme was a Letter to the Future which was received with open arms by Coe and his team committed to delivering a successful games in London; stating that the team were determined to satisfy the British public's insatiable appetite for elite sport. Craven continuing stated that the Olympic Delivery Authority and LOCOG have helped inspired a generation; adding that this were not just London's Games, but thanks to LOCOG's Charles Alan's group, they were the Games of the United Kingdom and noted that the country had a feel good factor like never before. Craven stated that there were numerous of examples of teams working together and noted that those with irrepressible smiles and a fountain of knowledge is whom the biggest cheer should be reserved for, stating "has already happened and will happen again", the thousands of Games Makers. Craven went on to hail the International and national technical officials, classifiers and particularly the armed forces and emergency services who had stepped into the breach. Paralympians were noted by Craven for giving to the world many feats that people thought impossible, causing the media to be wax lyrical, and leading many spectators to create what Boris Johnson described as a wall of noise. Craven stated that the Games had truly come home and had found a path for the future. Craven congratulated London for staging what were "unique and without doubt, in my mind and those of the athletes, the greatest Paralympic Games ever." Craven concluded by linking Stephen Hawking's words about changing perceptions across multiple dimensions from the opening ceremony to George Glenn, a five-year-old, who was asked a question by his mother, Emma, when reading a book called Treasure. Emma asked who that man was on the first page, who was dressed as a pirate. George's reply was "well he only has one leg – so he must be an athlete." Craven stated that kids just get it now we all do thanks to the amazing performance witnessed here. Craven closed the 2012 Paralympic Games and stated that these Paralympic Games will live for an eternity and called on all Paralympic athletes around the world to meet again in four years in Rio. Craven ended with a big, big thank you for the people of London and the United Kingdom.

Following Sir Philip's speech, the Paralympics cauldron was extinguished, save for one petal. British Paralympians Eleanor Simmonds and Jonnie Peacock lit their torches with this last flame, and they in turn passed the flame on to performers who spread out onto the field of play, representing an eternal flame reaching all people. Coldplay and Rihanna returned to the stage with rapper Jay-Z to perform his collaboration "Run This Town", followed by a reprise of "Paradise" with new rap verses from Jay-Z.

=== Finale ===
This was then followed by a performance by Coldplay of "The Scientist" set to a video montage of highlights from the Games. Coldplay closed the ceremony with a performance of "Every Teardrop Is a Waterfall", while fountains on the stages sprayed and performers danced in the "rain". The final song was followed by a fireworks display over the Olympic Stadium and the Thames River, accompanied by an orchestral and choral arrangement of Coldplay's "Politik", during which Tower Bridge was raised. The display ended with the Union Flag being projected on the Palace of Westminster, which faded to black, revealing a message reading "Thank you London, Thank you UK." Stadium announcers Trish Bertram and Marc Edwards closed the ceremony with a farewell message – To the athletes of the world to the people of London and the United Kingdom, to the volunteers and the staff of the London 2012 Organising Committee, thank you for an unforgettable summer, and thank you for inspiring a generation. Good night and goodbye.

== Reception ==
An estimated number of 7.7 million people watched the closing ceremony on Channel 4.

Bernadette McNulty of The Daily Telegraph characterized the closing ceremony as a more "thematic, pagan-style show" than the intellectual opening ceremony, and described its opening scene as "a fire-filled opener filled with cannibalised machines that looked like a cross between War Horse and Scrapheap Challenge." Whilst acknowledging that Coldplay may not be considered the best example of British music by all viewers, McNulty praised the band for "[knowing] how to play to a stadium and fill it with emotionally, uplifting anthems" and for not performing their "potentially patronizing 'Fix You'." McNulty concluded by proclaiming that "the most successful Paralympics ever thankfully got the rousing closing ceremony that it deserved."

The Guardian's Alexis Petridis noted that portions of the closing ceremony had a noticeably darker feel than the other ceremonies of the Olympics and Paralympics in London, but complimented it for having "[a] whiff of the kind of thing you see at 3am in the outlying fields at Glastonbury", unlike the Olympics' closing ceremony, which had "a whiff of a bad night at the Brits." Although he considered some of Coldplay's slower, anthem-like songs to be in conflict with his belief that the Paralympics were not about "pity" (which he associated the songs with through their use on reality TV shows), Petridis praised Coldplay's more upbeat performances, such as their performance of "Strawberry Swing" alongside the Paraorchestra, and concluded that the performance of "Run This Town" was "weirdly appropriate" when viewed in the context of the Games.

== See also ==
- 2012 in British television
- 2012 Summer Olympics closing ceremony
- List of Coldplay live performances
