= Honouring the Ancient Dead =

Advocacy group in Britain for the dignified treatment of human remains

Honouring the Ancient Dead (HAD) is a British Neopagan advocacy group working within Britain for the dignified treatment of human remains of British pagan provenance. It explores the issues of excavation, storage, museum display, disposal, repatriation and reburial. In particular questioning the idea of who has assumed authority over human remains, its core remit is dialogue and consultation between all relevant bodies when decisions are made about the remains of the ancient dead.

== History ==
The organization was founded by Emma Restall Orr, during the May 2004 negotiations regarding roads around Stonehenge.

It makes no difference how long ago someone died. We are their living relatives.

HAD proposed a "Rite for the Committal of Human Remains" which focuses on respect while avoiding references to specific faiths or beliefs. HAD is not calling for mandatory reburial.

Honouring the Ancient Dead communicates with academics and museums to raise awareness of the treatment of human remains in the British Isles. Many museums are sending human remains belonging to native peoples of other countries back for reburial. Where British remains are concerned, it is difficult to prove direct ancestry, nor is there coherence of religious belief through time connecting the ancient dead with the living. However, Honouring the Ancient Dead is challenging museums, curators and scientists to consider the British dead in a new light and to treat all remains with respect. The debate over human remains ranges widely with the needs of science, specific cultures, and the bones themselves under consideration. HAD works successfully in cooperation with museums such as The Manchester Museum (with whom it ran a conference in 2006), Leicester Museums, the Museum of London and many others, and has been developing sound relations with the National Trust and English Heritage.

Current government guidelines regarding human remains are sympathetic to genealogical descendants, the cultural community of origin, and the Country of Origin. They require some proof of cultural, spiritual and religious significance of the remains.

Claims are unlikely to be successful for any remains over 300 years old, and are unlikely to be considered for remains over 500 years old, except where a very close and continuous geographical, religious, spiritual and cultural link can be demonstrated.
