= Mark Dornford-May =

South African theatre and film director

Mark Dornford-May OBE
- Born: Mark Dornford-May; Yorkshire, England
- Occupations: Theatre director and film director
- Spouse: Pauline Malefane
- Children: 4, including Chumisa

Mark Anthony Dornford-May OBE is a British theatre and film director based in South Africa.

== Early life and education ==
Mark Dornford-May was born in Yorkshire, England. His mother was a school teacher, and his father the Drama Adviser for Cheshire County Council, receiving an MBE for services to theatre in the 1980s.

He studied drama at Bristol University in Bristol, England.

== Career ==
Dornford-May was offered an assistant directorship with the Royal Shakespeare Company, working with Terry Hands on Coriolanus and The Duchess of Malfi as well as directing The Invisible Man, based on the book by Ralph Ellison dealing with black identity and the political struggle to find it, and coordinating The Plays Banned by Television Season at the then RSC Warehouse Theatre. After leaving the RSC, Dornford-May founded the Playwrights Company at Bristol Old Vic, specialising in the creation of new work which was supported and funded by Tom Stoppard.

In November 2010, Dornford-May wrote an opinion piece for a South African newspaper in which he deplored the "White Face" of South African theatre and the lack of critics who could speak any African language. After publication, he received much criticism in the press from the art establishment.

Dornford-May helped to establish the Fugard Theatre in Cape Town, funded by sole patron Eric Abraham, which opened its doors in 2010, and Isango Portobello were intended to have a residency at the new theatre. However, their residency was brought to an end and Dornford-May lost his position as creative director after less than a year amid claims of poor box office takings.

== Recognition and honours ==
Dornford-May was appointed Officer of the Order of the British Empire (OBE) in the 2022 Birthday Honours for services to the arts in South Africa.

== Personal life ==
In 2002, he married South African actress and singer Pauline Malefane, and together they have three children (Dornford-May also has a daughter from an earlier marriage). In 2004 he became a permanent resident of South Africa and in 2007 he was officially inducted into the Sotho clan of his wife's family.

== Filmography ==
- Son of Man
- U-Carmen eKhayelitsha
- Unogumbe - Noye's Fludde
- Breathe - Umphefumlo
