= Son of Man (2006 film) =

- DVD box cover
- Directed by: Mark Dornford-May
- Written by: Mark Dornford-May; Andiswa Kedama
- Produced by: Stephen Daldry; Mike Downey; Sam Taylor; Lucinda Englehart
- Starring: Andile Kosi; Noluthando Boqwana; Pauline Malefane; Andries Mbali
- Cinematography: Giulio Biccari
- Edited by: Anne Sopel; Ronelle Loots
- Music by: Charles Hazlewood; Pauline Malefane; Sibulele Mjali
- Production company: Spier Films
- Distributed by: Lorber Films
- Release date: 22 January 2006
- Running time: 86 minutes
- Country: South Africa
- Languages: Xhosa; English

Son of Man is a 2006 drama film directed by South African director Mark Dornford-May. It was the first South African motion picture to make its debut at the Sundance Film Festival. The film is an alternate retelling of Christ's crucifixion and resurrection set in modern-day South Africa.

== Plot ==
During a violent raid from an ongoing civil war, Mary seeks shelter from the ensuing bloodshed. Discovering an abandoned school with deceased villagers inside, she sees an angel who informs her that she will give birth to the son of God. Mary raises her son Jesus until he grows to adulthood. Later in life, Jesus begins preaching faith which embraces compassion, while rejecting the corruption and brutality of the current political leadership. Jesus' teachings attract a handful of disciples. Soon, military occupation forces take over the land. The behavior of those who oppose their authority are monitored closely by the new government.

While intelligence agents regard Jesus as being harmless, one of his disciples, Judas, secretly meets with the authorities and convinces them that he is a threat to society. The military leadership interrogate, and later torture Jesus into giving up his preaching. He refuses, and is murdered. Mary exhumes his body from a shallow grave, as he is later set on a cross in crucified form for all the citizens of the town to view. The inhabitants sing praises in his memory, but are stopped by the military who disband the assembly. Jesus is later resurrected, and urges the natives to continue singing the praise of God in honor of his movement.

== Cast ==
- Andile Kosi as Jesus
- Pauline Malefane as Mary
- Jim Hgxabaze as Judas

== Production ==
=== Themes ===
The theme of the film as related by director Dornford-May, was "the story of Jesus reclaimed as an African fable; a simple concept becomes a remarkable cinematic experience in Son of Man." Dornford-May dramatised the story of the life of Jesus in the situation of contemporary Africa and asked what would happen today, if someone in Africa came forward with the same message as Jesus? He noted, "Andile Kosi plays Jesus, who is born in the state of Judea in southern Africa, where violence and poverty are rife. As civil war breaks out, Jesus demands that his followers forswear warfare and follow a life of peace."

== Release ==
=== Initial screenings ===
The film was released on 22 January 2006, in the United States. In Europe, the film premiered in the Netherlands on 9 September 2006 at the Africa in the Picture Film Festival. It also debuted in the United Kingdom at the London Film Festival on 21 October 2006.

== Reception ==
=== Critical response ===
Film review aggregator Rotten Tomatoes reports that 86% critics gave the film a positive review, based on seven critics with an average score of 6.80/10.

=== Accolades ===
Son of Man was nominated and won several awards in 2006. It received the first Veto-Jury prize at the Africa Film Festival in the Belgian university city of Louvain on 5 May 2007. The jury was selected by the student magazine Veto, which brought together seven students representing a number of faculties of the Catholic University of Leuven. The students gave the reasons for their award: "We selected a film which stimulates viewers to think and which does not leave them feeling indifferent. Musical beat, rapid rhythms, alternation of several styles and original shots ensure that the film is always stimulating. It is a film of a 'best-seller', but nothing is obvious in it; the story as we know it is turned upside down."

Award	Category	Nominee	Result
L.A. Pan African Film Festival	Best Feature		Won
Sundance Film Festival	Grand Jury Prize, "World Cinema"		Nominated
BFI London Film Festival	Official Selection		Nominated

== See also ==
- 2006 in film
