= Cinema of the Faroe Islands =

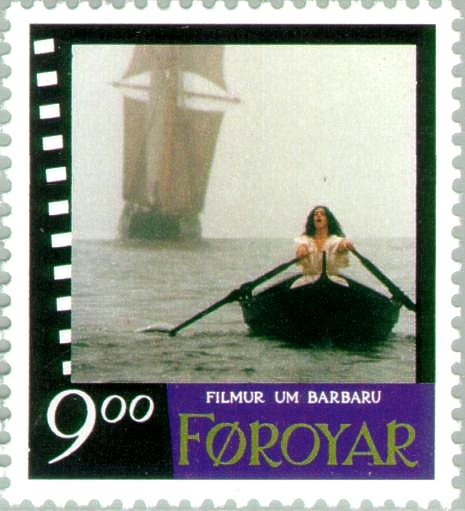
Norwegian Anneke von der Lippe as the Faroese Beinta Broberg in the 1997 Danish film Barbara

Due to its small population size and the high initial cost of filmmaking, the cinema history of the Faroe Islands is modest. The first film director of the Faroe Islands was Katrin Ottarsdóttir. Her first film set in the Faroe Islands was Atlantic Rhapsody (1989).

The first feature films in Faroese language with full Faroese castings, Rannvà (1975), Heystblómur (1976) and Pall Fángi (1977), were made in the mid-1970s by Miguel Marín Hidalgo, a Spaniard who stayed for several years in the Faroe Islands. In July 2015, the three films were screened again in the Faroe Islands, at the Nordic House in Tórshavn, with the presence of its writer, Miguel Marín Hidalgo. The Faroese national broadcaster, Kringvarp Føroya, broadcast Rannvá on 25 and 27 December 2016 and Heystblómur on 1 and 3 January 2017.

In 2009 self-taught filmmaker Johan Rimestad directed the feature comedy Karrybollarnir, which takes place in Tórshavn. In 2020 he directed the documentary "Disupting Wine" about faroese entrepreneur Heini Zachariassen and the creation of the app Vivino.

In 2012, the first Faroese film prize, the Geytin, was established. The young Faroese director Sakaris Stórá won the first award for his short film Summarnátt (transl. Summer night). In 2013, he directed a new short film Vetrarmorgun (transl. Winter morning), which was awarded at the 64th Berlin International Film Festival.

In 2014 grants for filmmaking were on the Faroese government budget (fíggjarlógin) for the first time. 22 applied for a grant, 9 of these received a grant; all together, the grants were worth 485 000 Danish krone.

== List of films of the Faroe Islands ==
This is a list of films concerning the Faroe Islands; either the director or the film is Faroese, or parts of it are played in the Faroe Islands:

- 1975 – Rannvá
- 1976 – Heystblómur
- 1977 – Páll Fangi
- 1989 – Atlantic Rhapsody
- 1990 – 1700 meter fra fremtiden
- 1992 – Tre blink mod vest
- 1995 – Maðurin ið slapp at fara
- 1997 – Barbara (Denmark)
- 1998 – Dansinn (Iceland)
- 1999 – Bye Bye Blue Bird
- 2002 – Burturhugur
- 2003 – Brudepigen - Færgeturen - Jagten på kæledyret
- 2005 – Trøllini og Mafian
- 2008 – Ein regla um dagin má vera nokk!
- 2008 – Eingin kann gera tað perfekta
- 2009 – Karrybollarnir
- 2009 – Sporini vaksa úr orðum
- 2012 – Summarnátt
- 2013 – Vertarmorgun
- 2014 – Ludo
- 2014 – Skuld
- 2016 – Gjógv - millum Norðhavið og Skarðið
- 2017 – Dreymar við Havið
- 2021 – Skál
- 2025 – Seinasta Paradís á Jørð

== See also ==
- Cinema of the world
- Kringvarp Føroya – Public broadcaster in the Faroe Islands
