= Guð blessi Ísland =

"God Bless Iceland", phrase uttered by Iceland's Prime Minister

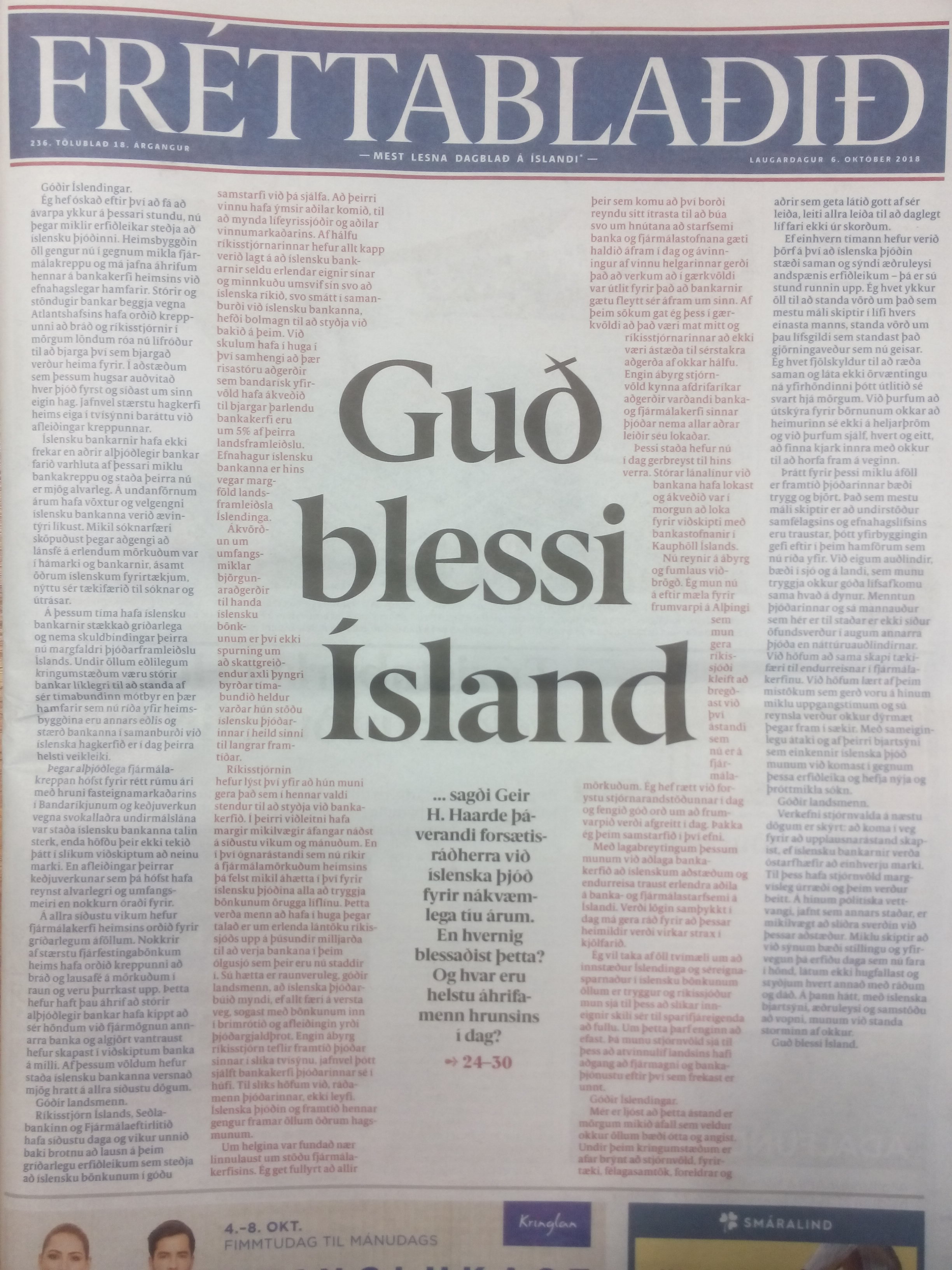
Front page of Fréttablaðið, 6 October 2018, reprinting Geir Haarde's 'Guð blessi Ísland' speech a decade later, in the colors of the Icelandic flag.

Guð blessi Ísland ('God bless Iceland') is the sentence with which the Icelandic Prime Minister Geir Haarde ended his television broadcast to the Icelandic nation on 6 October 2008, shortly after the beginning of the 2008–11 Icelandic financial crisis. The speech described the perilous state of the Icelandic banking sector and some of the government's efforts to improve the situation. Geir's closing words quickly became a symbol of the crash in Iceland.

== Analyses ==
In Geir's own account, the words were intended to be a 'friendly farewell' ('vinaleg kveðja') rather than a prayer, but the words were widely understood as a sinister indication of the desperate straits in which Iceland found itself. As analysed by Eiríkur Bergmann,

On Monday 6 October 2008 Prime Minister Geir Haarde addressed the nation on television. Apart from the traditional annual New Year’s Eve address, this is something our PM never does. We were all watching, gathered round TV sets and computer screens in our workplace, in cafés and at home on that misty afternoon. It was not just that this sophisticated and usually perfectly composed man seemed shaken but that he concluded his unique address by asking God to bless Iceland. This is when we knew we were in serious trouble. Iceland is quite secular. Unlike American politicians, Icelandic politicians never refer to God in public – at least not without cracking a joke.

One account of an everyday person's response to the speech, collected by Alda Sigmundsdóttir, runs:

I remember the day Geir Haarde gave his God Bless Iceland speech and a woman came in the shop and she was so afraid. I didn’t even know he was going to make the speech, so I hadn’t heard it. I remember my heart started racing and I just thought: My God, what is happening? It felt a bit like the terrorist attacks on New York, when everyone just stood there, so powerless, unable to comprehend the scope of it.

Another account by Katrín, a school teacher living in Reykjavik, recalled:

I was teaching then. I was at school with my pupils and I got a message on my phone: “Turn on the TV.” And we were all watching it, and the kids kept asking, “What does it mean, Katrín, what does it mean?” and I was like, shit, how bad is it? This speech, you know, this one made by Haarde, “God bless Iceland” […] it was unprecedented, so for all of us it was really, really serious. And it wasn’t like, you know, “I saw it coming.” I didn’t know that this would happen.

The week following the speech saw a statistically significant rise in the number of women admitted to Iceland's cardiac emergency department, which researchers have argued correlated with the news of Iceland's economic collapse.

== Influence in popular culture ==
A radio play of the same name by Símon Birgisson and Malte Scholz was broadcast by Útvarpsleikhúsið in September 2009 and an eponymous documentary film by Helgi Felixson premiered on the first anniversary of the speech.

A music track entitled Guð blessi Ísland concludes the Crash-themed concept album Helvítis fokking funk by the Samúel Jón Samúelsson Big Band.

Geir's phrase is discussed in Ragnheiður Gestsdóttir's novel Hjartsláttur; discussed in Gunnar Sigurðsson's 2010 documentary Maybe I Should Have; and the speech is a backdrop to the closing pages of Eiríkur Bergmann's novel Hryðjuverkamaður snýr heim, the phrase 'Guð blessi Ísland' being the last words of the book. The phrase is alluded to in Bjarki Karlsson's satire on Iceland's banking boom and crash 'Þúsaldarháttur', stanza 11 of which describes the Crash:

Svo bilaði spottinn og botninn var dottinn úr ballinu hressa,
píslar- með -vottinn við peningaþvottinn menn pukruðust hlessa,
breskur dró hrottinn upp hryðjuverksplottin er heift sauð í vessa
og ei vildi Drottinn (sem er víst svo gott skinn) Ísaland blessa.

Translation:

Then the string broke and the floor had fallen from the lively disco;
people began whispering about the martyr at the money-laundering;
the British ruffian, in whose blood boiled spite, cooked up the terrorism scheme;
and the Lord (who’s of course such a good bloke) didn’t want to bless the Land of Ice.

== See also ==
- Helvítis fokking fokk
