= Helvítis fokking fokk =

Icelandic neologism coined during the 2008–2011 Icelandic financial crisis

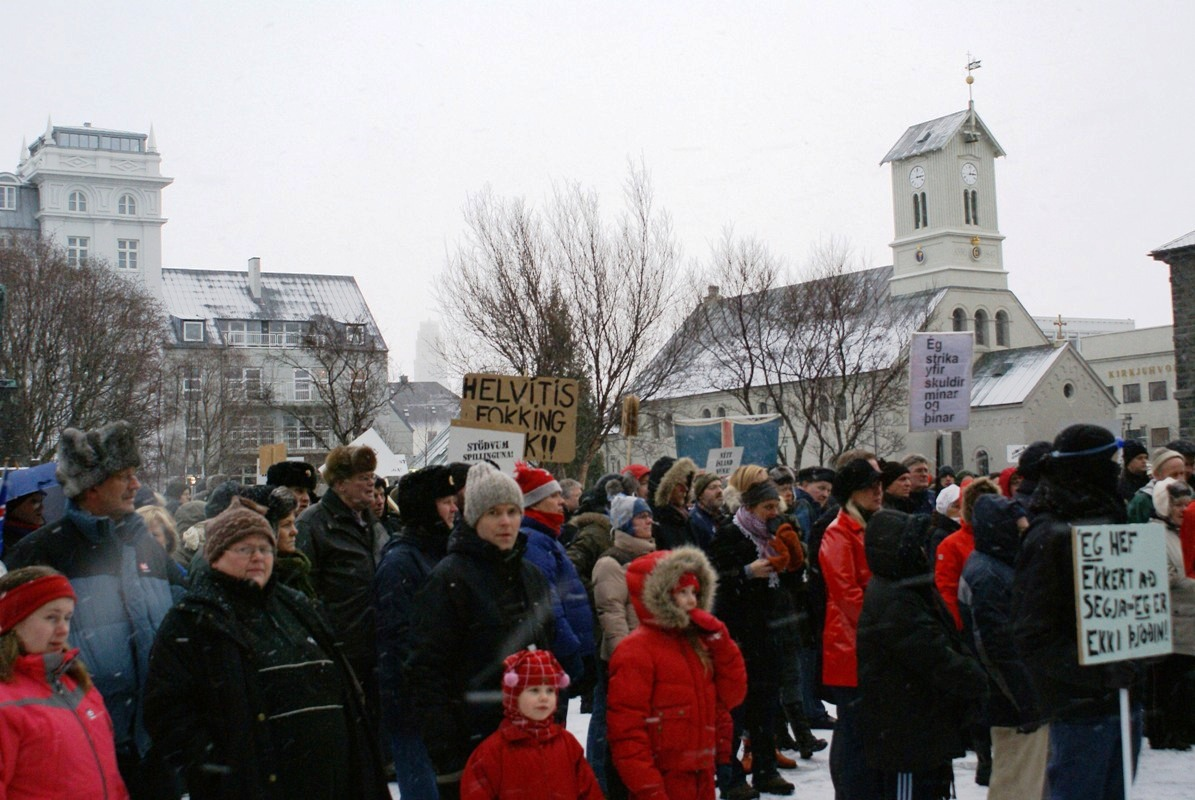
Protests at Austurvöllur, 17 January 2009, including a placard (centre) reading Helvítis fokking fokk!!

Helvítis fokking fokk (translated by Eiríkur Bergmann as 'God Damn, Fucking Fuck', Roger Boyes as 'What the Fuckety Fucking Fuck', and by Michael J. Casey as 'Bloody Fucking Fuck') is an Icelandic neologism which became a widely used expression of discontent during the 2008–2011 Icelandic financial crisis.

== History ==
The phrase was coined by the artist Gunnar Már Pétursson, who painted the message on a placard while protesting outside the Icelandic parliament. The phrase was further popularised in a comedy sketch performed by Jón Gnarr and broadcast on the traditional New Year's Eve comedy revue, Áramótaskaupið, in 2008. In the sketch, inspired by Gunnar Már's story, Jón played a strait-laced middle-aged protester participating in the kitchenware revolution struggling to express his indignation at the crisis and eventually coming up with a sign reading Helvítis fokking fokk!!

The phrase swiftly became widely used in Iceland in relation to the Crisis, as an expression of widely felt anger at corruption and mishandling of the economy. People even made real-life signs bearing the phrase which they took to the protests on Austurvöllur; it was also printed on T-shirts. According to Sóley Björk Stefánsdóttir, the two biggest Facebook groups relating to the Crisis were 'Icelanders are NOT terrorists' (17,188 members) and 'Helvítis fokking fokk' (9,396 members). Describing the city-centre office of the Borgarahreyfingin party, Georg Fornes mentions that 'both inside the place and outside you could see various items from the demonstrations, including pots, cake-tins, and dirty placards with the slogan Helvítis Fokking Fokk!’

Although usually an interjection, the term is also attested as a substantive, referring to the situation surrounding the financial crisis in general.

== Appearances in art and literature ==
A picture of the artist Gunnar Már Pétursson holding his own placard reading Helvítis fokking fokk! appears on the cover of Guðni Th. Jóhannesson's history of the crisis.

The title of the Crisis-themed concept album Helvítis fokking funk by the Samúel Jón Samúelsson Big Band is a pun on Helvítis fokking fokk.

The usefulness of the phrase is discussed by characters in Ragnheiður Gestsdóttir's novel Hjartsláttur. It is also the favourite phrase of the character Guðni in Ævar Örn Jósepsson's 2010 novel Önnur líf.

The phrase became part of the title of a literature course at the University of Iceland, taught by Jón Karl Helgason in 2014-15: 'Helvítis fokking fokk: Hrunið í íslenskum bókmenntum' ('The Crash in Icelandic literature').

== See also ==
- Guð blessi Ísland
