= Super 16 =

Super 16 may refer to

- 16 mm film
- Super16 (film school), a film school in Copenhagen, Denmark
- "Super 16", a song by Neu! from the album Neu! 2
- A proposed expansion of the southern hemisphere Super Rugby rugby union competition
