= List of magazines in Iceland =

Magazines in Iceland appeared during the late 18th century in the form of secular reading materials. The number of magazines significantly expanded in the last decades of the 19th century.

One of the earliest lifestyle magazines in Iceland is Nýtt Líf which was founded in 1978. The National Union of Icelandic Journalists publishes a biannual magazine covering journalistic activities in the country.

The following is an incomplete list of current and defunct magazines published in Iceland.

== F ==
- Fjölnir

== I ==
- Icelandic Geographic
- Iceland Review

== M ==
- Mannlíf

== N ==
- Nýtt Líf

== R ==
- The Reykjavík Grapevine
