= Þorgrímur Þráinsson =

Icelandic writer and footballer

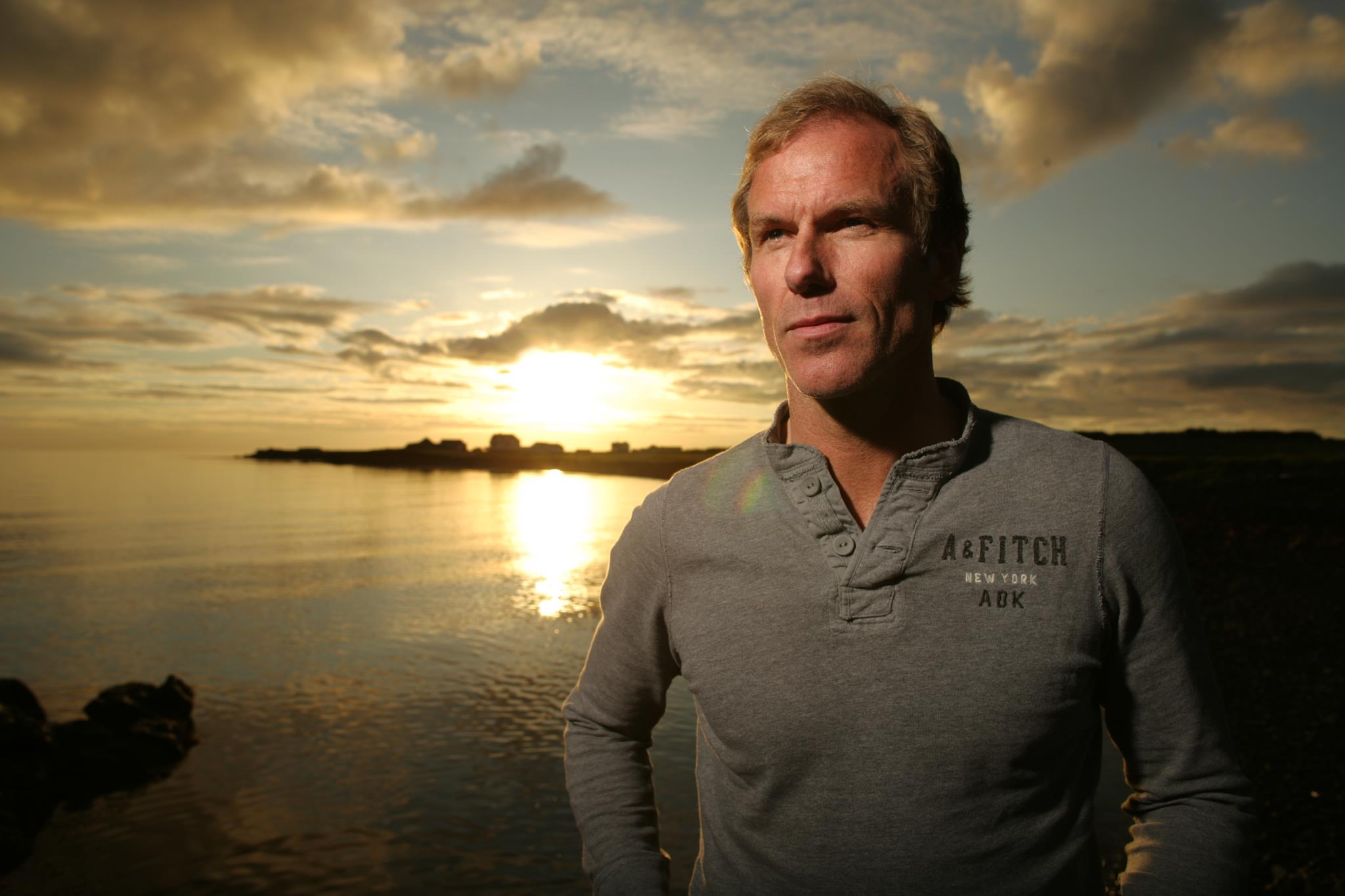
- Born: 8 January 1959 (age 67); Reykjavík, Iceland
- Occupations: Writer, motivational speaker, footballer (retired)
- Spouse: Ragnhildur Eiriksdottir (m. 1990)
- Awards: -2016: Children's Welfare Award -2013: City Artist of Reykjavík -2011: The Children’s Book Award -2010: Icelandic Children's Book Prize -2010: The Children’s Book Award -2005: 1st prize in a script contest of Reykjanesbær -2000: Children's book award -1997:Icelandic Children's Book Prize -1992: Visa-cultural prize -1991: Children's book award of Reykjavík
Association football career
- Position: Defender
Senior career*
Years	Team	Apps	(Gls)
197?–1978	Víkingur Ólafsvík		
1979–1990	Valur		
1992	Stjarnan	18	(0)
International career
1981–1990	Iceland	17	(0)
Managerial career
- 2009: Valur
- * Club domestic league appearances and goals

Þorgrímur Þráinsson (born 8 January 1959 in Reykjavík), is an Icelandic writer, motivational speaker and former footballer. He has been a spokesperson for health, humanity and justice.

== Writer ==
Since 1989, Þorgrímur has written 38 books. He has been Iceland's most popular author of books for teenagers. His books are listed among most sold, rented and read books in Iceland. [see bibliography]

=== Statistical facts ===
- According to statistics provided by Icelandic libraries, a book by Þorgrímur is rented once every 5 minutes.
- Seven of his books made it to the list of the 100 Best Books of the Century published by Icelandic Publishers' Association.
- Two of his books were listed as Best Children's Books of the Century published by Icelandic Publishers' Association, which is the second highest score after the Nobel Prize Winner Halldór Laxness.
- He is the only author in Iceland to simultaneously have 2 of his books in 1st and 2nd place on the Icelandic Record Sale List.
- Two of his books were listed as Best Selling Fiction Books in 2010: The Fog and Are You God, Granddad?
- His book, How to Make Your Wife Happy – Sexual and Practical Tips for Men, was the most talked-about book in Iceland in 2007.

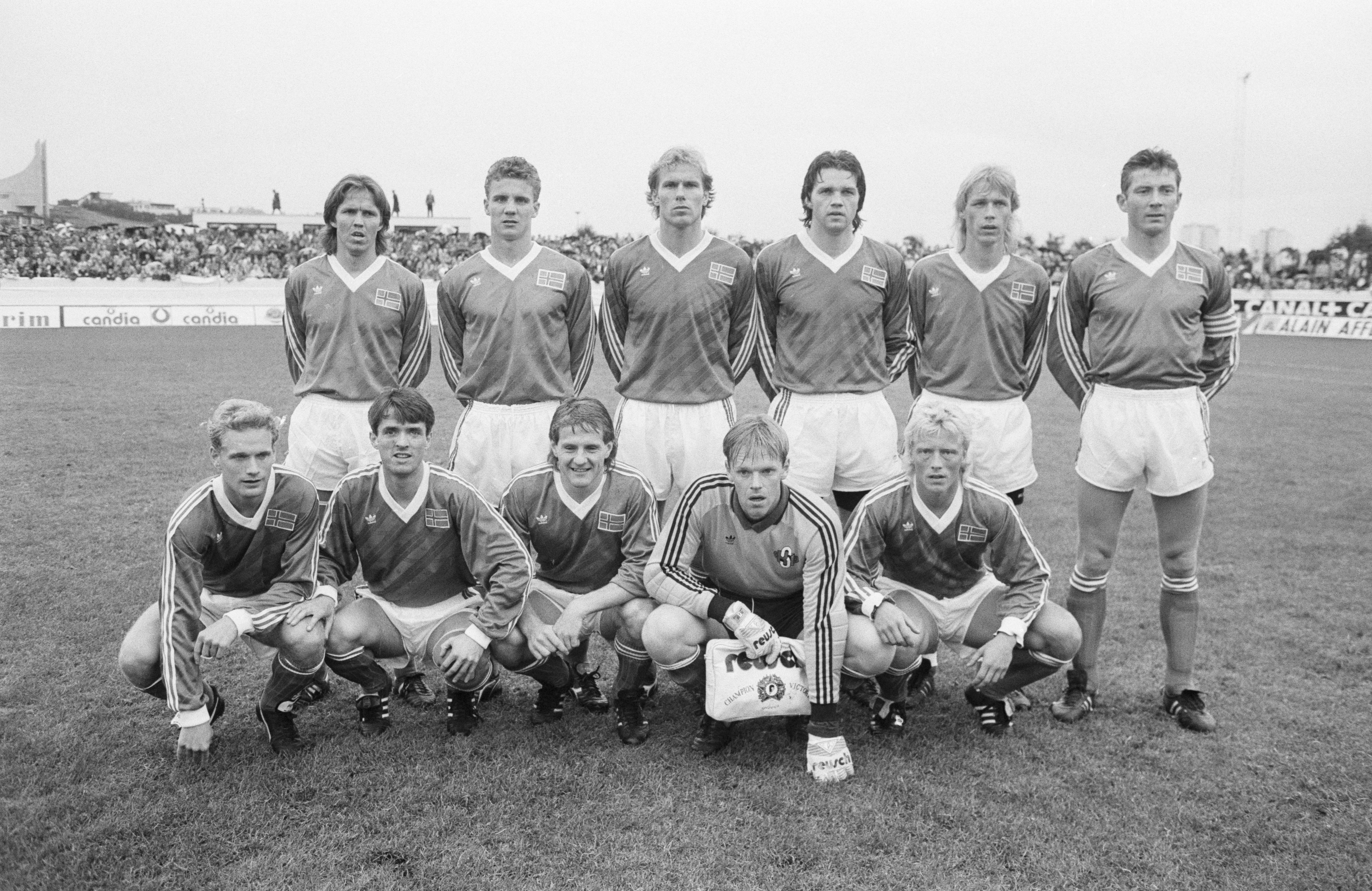
Thorgrimur Thrainsson, Iceland's National Team, 1990

== Career in sports ==
=== Playing career ===
Þorgrímur began his career with Víkingur Ólafsvík in the third division. He played 179 matches in the Icelandic Úrvalsdeild karla for Valur, one of Iceland's biggest clubs. He acted as the captain of the team from 1986 to 1990, during this period Valur became national champions 3 times and 2 times Icelandic Cup winner. Þorgrímur played 12 games with Valur in the UEFA Champions League, against Aston Villa, Juventus, Monaco, Nantes, Dynamo Berliner and Wismut Aue.

From 1979 to 1990 Þorgrímur played 17 games for the Icelandic national team.

=== President of Valur ===
In October 2016, Þorgrímur was voted as the president of Valur and served until May 2019.

=== Work for the national team ===
From 2007 Þorgrímur worked for the national football team. The work included involvement with the preparations of the National Team to the participation in UEFA Euro 2016, in France, which turned out to be the biggest football success in the Icelandic history. He was involved in supporting the national team in their preparations to the participation in the 2018 FIFA World Cup in Russia.

== Health campaigns ==
=== Head of Tobacco Control Task Force of Iceland ===
Þorgrímur was the head of the Tobacco Control Task Force of Iceland from 1996 to 2004. He was attempting to make Iceland the first country in the world to implement a smoking ban in clubs and restaurants. Iceland became the first country in the world to implement the Tobacco display ban.

The President of Iceland, Ólafur Ragnar Grímsson was a big support to his work and some of the press meetings were hosted by the President in the President's residence.

=== National Health Analysis Committee ===
In 2005 the Prime Minister of Iceland appointed Þorgrímur to be the head of the National Health Analysis Committee . In 2007 The committee delivered a report called: ''Easy life? -- how we can improve peoples' health by more activity and better nutrition.” The report suggested potential improvement of the population's health, implemented mainly in the area of diet, awareness of physical activity and mental health. The indicated strategy was prioritizing the youngest age groups, following the idea that a healthy child is most likely to become a healthy adult.

In 2013 he was the head of the committee again, this time appointed by the Minister of Health.

=== TV reality show ===
In 2008 Þorgrímur participated in lasting 8 weeks reality show Cool in great shape by Basecamp Productions, which portrayed different public figures performing various sports and fitness tasks in order to have their biological age estimated based on their performance and health tests. Þorgrímur won the contest and at the chronological age of 49 Þorgrímur's biological age was estimated to be 27.

== Motivational speaking ==
Since 2008, Þorgrímur has conducted programs consisting of presentations and motivational lectures for adolescents aged 15–16, titled: "Be in love with life!" and for children aged 12–14, titled: "Be the hero in your life -- by helping others". His presentations encourage youth to be responsible for their life and future and to set goals. During the past 10 years his program has taken place in all the schools of Iceland. Þorgrímur's program delivers approx. 200 speeches and presentations a year, which will reach 2,000 in total by 2018. Annually he also delivers about 25 presentations for the companies: ,,Great team spirit—what can we learn from the national team?“.

== Other work and activities ==
=== Editorial work and journalism ===
From 1986 to 1997 Þorgrímur worked as the chief editor of Sports Magazine, and from 2002 to 2007 of Toyota Magazine.

From 1985 until 1997 he worked as a journalist for 10 different magazines such as: Fiskifréttir, Sjávarfréttir, Nýtt Líf, Mannlíf, ABC, Íþróttablaðið, Hús og hýbýli, Við sem fljúgum, Gróður og garðar.

=== Politics ===
In January 2016, Þorgrímur announced his intention to run to run for presidency in the 2016, Icelandic presidential election. A few months later he decided to withdraw from the campaign in order to stay focused on motivational work with youth and to continue the work with the National Team during their participation in UEFA Euro 16.

=== Anecdotal reports ===
Many anecdotal reports by locals and tourists in Iceland were published in media, depicting Þorgrímur as someone who "displayed a helpful attitude in an unexpected situation".

=== Modeling ===
During his football career, Þorgrímur worked as a model for local clothing brands such as Icewear and Henson.

=== Personal life ===
Þorgrímur is married and has three children.

== Awards ==
- 2016: Barnaheill (Children's Welfare Award) for his contribution to the welfare of children
- 2013: City Artist of Reykjavík. Selected by the Mayor, Jón Gnarr, and as a result of voting by all political parties, for his literary contribution to the awareness and education of children and young adults
- 2011: The Children's Book Award for Are You God, Granddad?
- 2010: The Icelandic Children's Book Prize for, Are You God, Granddad?
- 2010: The Children's Book Award for Zero Zero 9
- 2005: 1st prize in a script contest of Reykjanesbær for Little red mouse
- 2000: Children's book award for The cow that disappeared
- 1997: Icelandic Children's Book Prize for, Much hides in the dark
- 1992: Visa-cultural prize for contribution to children's books
- 1991: Children's book award of Reykjavík for The tear, smile and football shoes

== Bibliography ==
- 1989 Með fiðring í tánum
- 1990 Tár, bros og takkaskór
- 1991 Mitt er þitt - ISBN 9979-802-12-X
- 1992 Bak við bláu augun - ISBN 9979-802-38-3
- 1992 Lalli Ljósastaur - ISBN 9979-802-87-1
- 1993 Spor í myrkri - ISBN 9979-802-40-5
- 1994 Kvöldsögur - ISBN 9979-802-42-1
- 1994 Amo Amas - ISBN 9979-802-54-5
- 1995 Sex augnablik - ISBN 9979-802-32-4
- 1996 Meistari Jón, predikari af Guðs náð - ISBN 9979-802-10-3
- 1997 Margt býr í myrkrinu - ISBN 9979-2-1238-1
- 1998 Nóttin lifnar við - ISBN 9979-71-192-2
- 1998 Hjálp, Keikó, hjálp
- 2000 Hlæjandi refur - ISBN 9979-1-0409-0
- 2000 Kýrin sem hvarf - ISBN 9979-767-04-9
- 2003 Litla skrímslið
- 2003 Svalasta 7an - ISBN 9979-9607-0-1
- 2004 Allt hold er hey
- 2004 Undir 4 augu - ISBN 9979-9607-2-8
- 2007 Hvernig gerirðu konuna þína hamingjusama
- 2008 Litla, rauða músin
- 2008 Þriðji ísbjörinn - ISBN 978-9979-3-3014-1
- 2009 Núll núll 9 - ISBN 978-9979-3-3092-9
- 2010 Ertu Guð, afi? - ISBN 978-9979-2-2119-7
- 2010 Þokan - ISBN 978-9979-3-3199-5
- 2011 Áfram hærra - 100 ára saga Vals
- 2011 Steina-Petra - ISBN 978-9979-72-019-5
- 2012 Krakkinn sem hvarf - ISBN 978-9979-3-3318-0
- 2014 Hjálp - ISBN 978-9979-3-3491-0
- 2015 Ég elska máva - ISBN 978-9979-3-3599-3
- 2016 Henri og hetjurnar - ISBN 978-9979-3-3713-3
- 2017 Henri hittir í mark - ISBN 978-9979-3-3884-0
- 2018 Henri rænt í Rússlandi
- 2018 Íslenska kraftaverkið: Á bak við tjöldin
- 2019 Allt hold er hey
- 2020 Fíllinn fljúgandi - ISBN 9789979342649
- 2021 Tunglið, tunglið taktu mig
- 2021 Verum ástanginn af lífinu
