= Marianne Blicher =

Danish film director

Marianne Blicher is a Danish director, visual artist and writer, currently based in Copenhagen. She started her career working as a stage manager in theater and as a producer in film. She is a graduate from Super16 film school in Denmark, and holds a master's degree in communication from Roskilde University. Her short film "Belinda Beautiful" won several prizes worldwide, including a Silver Dragon for best fiction film at the Krakow Film Festival, and the award for best international fiction in the In the Palace ISFF, for Belinda Beautiful, in 2014.
