= Sigri Mitra Gaïni =

Faroese poet, actress and school teacher

Sigri Mitra Gaïni (Persian: سیگری میترا قائنی; born 1975 in Oslo, Norway) is a Faroese poet, actress and school teacher.

== Work ==
Gaïni has published four collections of poems, written in Faroese. She represents the younger generation of female poets. In 2004 she won the Faroese Literature Prize in the category Fiction for her poem collection "2002 nætur" ("2002 Nights"). Four of her poems have been chosen for Faroese textbooks Les 2 and Les 3 (Read 2 and Read 3) used for teaching in the Faroese language in public schools.

In 2011 she received two months' wages, Starvsløn, from the Faroese government through the foundation Mentanargrunnurin. There were 98 Faroese artists who applied in 2011; 26 people got 1 to 4 months wage; five people got it from 6 months to one year. The longest period someone has got this kind of wage was for three years. It was given in 2010 to the composer Tróndur Bogason.

She played one of the main characters in Katrin Ottarsdóttir's Faroese/Danish movie Bye Bye Bluebird in 1999. The film won several awards, e.g. a Tiger Award at the International Film Festival Rotterdam in 2000. The film was also nominated for the Norwegian Amanda Award but did not win it.

== Bibliography ==
- 1997 Orð og andlit, Tórshavn: Forlagið Fannir, ISBN 99918-49-13-0
- 1998 Soflúgv - og øvugt, Tórshavn: Forlagið Fannir, ISBN 99918-49-21-1
- 2004 2002 nætur, Copenhagen: Mentunargrunnur Studentafelagsins, ISBN 99918-43-46-9
- 2010 Vaknandi, Copenhagen: Mentunargrunnur Studentafelagsins

== Filmography ==
- Bye Bye Bluebird (1999)
- Polle fiction (2002)

== Awards and Prizes ==
2004 - won the Faroese Literature Prize in the category fiction

== Family relations ==
Sigri Gaïni grew up in Norway and in the Faroe Islands. Her mother is Faroese and her father comes from Iran. Her mother is Lív Joensen, who is the daughter of Sigurð Joensen (1911-1993), a Faroese politician and writer, and one of the founders of Tjóðveldi (The Republican Party). Her grandmother was Sigrið av Skarði, a well-known Faroese journalist, teacher and feminist. She was the daughter of Símun av Skarði, who is most famous for writing the poem which now is the national hymn Tú alfagra land mítt (1906). One of Sigri's cousins is Sólrun Løkke Rasmussen, who is married to the prime minister of Denmark, Lars Løkke Rasmussen.

== Education ==
In 1995/96 she attended an 8-month long course at Filmhøjskolen in Ebeltoft, Denmark. After that she attended the Academy of Live and Recorded Arts in London. She also studied Philosophy at the University of Copenhagen, but finished by training as a school teacher, and now works in that capacity in Tórshavn.
