= Þórarinsdóttir =

Þórarinsdóttir is an Icelandic surname. Notable people with the surname include:

- Arndís Þórarinsdóttir (born 1982), Icelandic children's author
- Brynhildur Þórarinsdóttir (born 1970), Icelandic children's writer
- Steinunn Þórarinsdóttir (born 1955), Icelandic sculptor
