= Stian Hole =

Norwegian graphic designer, illustrator and author

- Born: 20 March 1969 Norway
- Occupation: Graphic designer, illustrator, writer of children's books
- Genre: Children's literature

Stian Hole (born 20 March 1969, in Tønsberg, Norway) is a Norwegian graphic designer, illustrator and writer of children's books.

== Biography ==
He has made numerous book covers and four picture books which have gained national and international recognition. His book Garmann's Summer earned him an Ezra Jack Keats New Writer Award in 2009. In 2009, he won the Nordic Children's Book Prize.
