= Høgni Mohr =

Faroese author

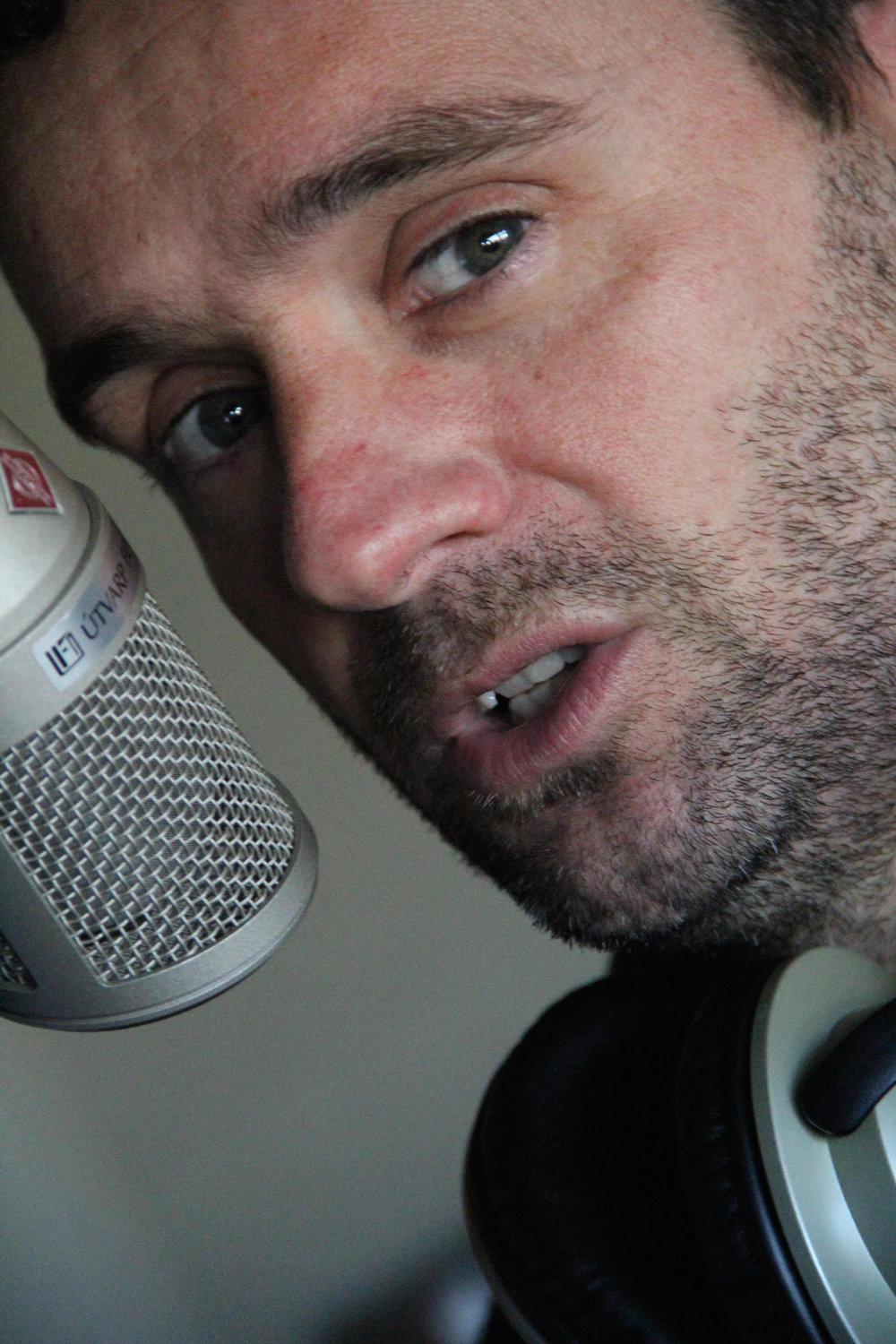
- Born: 8 October 1968 (age 58); Tórshavn
- Occupation: Author
- Writing career
- Language: Faroese
- Genre: Non fiction
- Notable works: Fractura Nasi (2017); Rejse for livet (2022); Saga JAM (2022)

Høgni Mohr (born 8 October 1968 in Tórshavn) is an awardwinnng Faroese author and journalist. His book Fractura Nasi was the best-selling book in the Faroe Islands in 2017. Fractura Nasi was translated into Danish 2019 by Kirsten Brix and published by Amanda Books. The novel was sold to movie production in 2018.

== Career ==
Mohr has worked for newspapers in the Faroes and has been published in Danish and Icelandic national newspapers. He spent several years working as a radio and TV reporter with Faroese national broadcaster Kringvarp Føroya. He has also worked for the BBC and Al Jazeera and has hosted nature programmes for Vice Media, as well as being a correspondent to the Huffington Post.

His literary works are published in Faroese and Danish.

Høgni Mohr has his very own style of writing. His texts are colorful, sincere and often incredibly entertaining. It is obvious to the reader that the author truly enjoys writing, and you can almost visualize the pleasure he feels as he comes up with his offbeat expressions. I hope his texts will be used in schools as an example of outstanding writing.

— Uni Arge, journalist.

Saga JAM, wrote a novelised biography about Mohr’s old friend Jan-Allan Müller, which was published in September 2022. The book won the Readers Price in 2024.

== Bibliography ==
- Mohr, Høgni (2006). Ali babba: og 49 aðrar blaðgreinir (in Faroese). Øgiliga egið forlag. OCLC 475920953
- Mohr, Høgni (2010). Tá deyðin verður avdúkaður (in Faroese). Øgiliga egið forlag. ISBN 9789991880518. OCLC 762372543. Documentary book about the lifelong journey from birth to death at the national hospital in the Faroe Islands.
- Mohr, Høgni (2017). Fractura nasi (in Faroese). Øgiliga egið forlag. ISBN 9789991880525. OCLC 1012884471 A narrative and poetic non-fiction road trip story. Faroe Islands best selling book in 2017. Danish translation: Rejse for livet (2019).
- Mohr, Høgni (2018). Slepp tær til heiti fani (in Faroese). Øgiliga egið forlag. ISBN 9789991880525. With illustrations by Astrid Andreasen.
- Mohr, Høgni (2019). mær dámar ikki Høgna Hoydal (in Faroese). Øgiliga egið forlag. ISBN 9789991880549.
- Mohr, Høgni (2020). Tað tómliga tolsemið (in Faroese). Øgiliga egið forlag. ISBN 9789991880556
- Mohr, Høgni (2021). Grøðandi greinir (in Faroese). Øgiliga egið forlag. ISBN 9789991880563
- Mohr, Høgni (2022). Saga JAM (in Faroese). Øgiliga egið forlag. ISBN 9789991880570
- Mohr, Høgni (2022). Where have all the ploughers gone? - Manuscript for movie about the Faroese horse
- Mohr, Høgni (2025). Solarium (In Faroese). Øgiliga egið forlag. ISBN 9789991880556
- Mohr, Høgni (2025). Elians Sonur (In Faroese). Øgiliga egið forlag.ISBN 9789991880587
- Mohr, Høgni (2026). Alkohol kongur í klostur (In Faroese). Heilbrigdi. ISBN 9789991838885

== Filmography ==
- 2013 - Summarsál (documentary series), 6 episodes, creator, director and host
- 2014 - Fall for ewe (short film), creator
- 2014 - Fat birds are easy pray: Fulmar hunting in the Faroe Islands (documentary), host
- 2021 - 111 good days (film), in the cast as himself
- 2022 - Starin í stovuni (documentary), director and producer

== Radio specials ==
- 2019 - Gamli maðurin og vatnið (radio series), 4 episodes, creator

== Awards, nominations etc. ==
- 2012 – 6-months grant from the Mentanargrunnur Landsins (Faroese Cultural Fund)
- 2014 – Nominated for the Faroese national short film award Geytin for the short film, "Fall for Ewe".
- 2019 – 6-months grant from the Mentanargrunnur Landsins (Faroese Cultural Fund)
- 2019 – Art grant from the Åland Cultural Committee for a art stay at the historic Eckerö_Mail_and_Customs_House
