= Kristín Steinsdóttir =

Icelandic writer

Kristín Steinsdóttir is a well-known children's author and translator in Iceland. Kristín Steinsdóttir was born in Seyðisfjörður (a small village with less than 800 residents, at the end of a 17 kilometer long fjord) on 11 March 1946. After finishing a training to become teacher in 1968, she became a teacher in Reykjavik. In 1972–1978, she lived in Göttingen and studied German and Danish there. She has a Bachelor of Arts (B.A) from the University of Iceland and moved to Norway with her family in 1978.

Kristín Steinsdóttir has been writing since 1988. She was on the board of The Writer's Union of Iceland from 1993 to 2001 and chair of The Icelandic Association of Children's Book Writers (SÍUNG) from 1999 to 2003.

She also wrote several plays together with her sister Iðunn Steinsdóttir.

== Awards ==
- Engill í vesturbænum (An Angel in the Neighbourhood):
  - 2004: The West-Nordic Council's Children's Literature Prize
  - 2003:
    - The Nordic Children's Book Prize
    - IBBY Iceland Award
    - Reykjavík Educational Prize
- 1999 Allocate from the Writers Library Fund
- Fjólubláir dagar (Violet Days): 1992 IBBY Iceland Award
- 1998 Akranes Town Artist
- Vestur í bláinn (Into a New World): 1998 Nominated, International Janusz Korczack Literature Prize, Poland
- 19 júní (June 19th): 1986 The Icelandic Broadcasting Service Playwright Prize (With Iðunn Steinsdóttir)
- Randaflugur (Bees): 1989 Third Prize in The Reykjavík City Theatre Playwright competition (With Iðunn Steinsdóttir)
- Mánablóm (Moonflower): 1989 Second Prize in The Reykjavík City Theatre Playwright competition (With Iðunn Steinsdóttir)
- Franskbrauð með sultu (Jam on White Bread): 1987 The Icelandic Children's Book Prize
