= The Color of Milk =

- Directed by: Torun Lian
- Written by: Torun Lian
- Produced by: Catho Bach Christensen; Knud Bjørne-Larsen; Anna Croneman; Odd Ween
- Cinematography: John Christian Rosenlund
- Edited by: Stian Johnsen
- Music by: Odin Staveland; Øyvind Staveland
- Release date: 27 July 2004 (Norway)
- Running time: 90 minutes
- Country: Norway
- Language: Norwegian

The Color of Milk (aka The Colour of Milk, Neither Naked nor Dressed, or Selma and Andy), original title Ikke naken, is a 2004 Norwegian family film by Torun Lian with Julia Krohn (Selma), Ane Dahl Torp (Nora), Gustaf Skarsgård (Främlingen).
