= Daniel Borgman =

New Zealand film director

Daniel Joseph Borgman
- Born: 1981 (age 44–45); Dunedin, New Zealand
- Occupation: Film director
- Years active: 2007 - present

Daniel Joseph Borgman (born 9 August 1981) is a New Zealand film director.

== Education ==
Borgman attended Bayfield High School. Borgman studied film science at Otago University in New Zealand, before moving to Copenhagen where he worked in post production, first as an assistant and later as a colorist and visual effects artist. In 2009, he started studying at the Danish film school Super16, his graduation project in 2012 being an experimental live film / theatre / happening entitled How to Say Goodbye.

== Career ==
Borgman's first short The Man & the Albatross (2007) premièred in the Leopards of Tomorrow competition at the Locarno International Film Festival. His second short film, Lars and Peter (2009), that captures the difficult emotions of a young boy and his relationship to his father in the face of great loss, was in the Official Selection in the short film competition at the 62nd Cannes Film Festival and was nominated for a Robert Award, the Danish Film Academy's national film prize.

In 2009 Borgman completed production of three more short films, Behaviour, Kaleidoscope and Berik. Berik is about a severely disabled man, blind and deformed due to radiation poisoning, who lives a lonely life in eastern Kazakhstan until the 11-year-old Adil one day lose his football and knocks on Berik's door to get his help to find it. Berik won the Canal+ Grand Prix in 49th Semaine de la Critique's short film section at the 63rd Cannes Film Festival, and Best European Short Film at Flanders International Film Festival Ghent in 2010, the latter meriting the film a nomination for Best Short Film at the 24th European Film Awards in 2011. The 2011 short drama Brainy, a 30-minute novel film made with funding from The Danish Film Institute's New Danish Screen scheme, was about the 10-year-old Brian, an imaginative boy who deals with the loss of his grandfather by constructing a fantasy world.

With a grant from Cinéfondation, Borgman spend five months in Paris writing his début feature film project, The Weight of Elephants (2013). An adaption of Australian author Sonya Hartnett's book Of a Boy, the film is a coming of age drama about 14-year-old Jess, a local paper boy, whose life is flipped upside down when a horrific murder happens in the street where he delivers newspapers. The Zentropa-produced film was screened at Riga International Film Festival, Beijing International Film Festival, Saint-Quentin Ciné-Jeune Film Festival, Paris Cine Junior, Göteborg International Film Festival, and won the Youth Jury Award for Best Picture at the 2013 Vlissingen, Film by the Sea Festival, and the Oecumenical Prize at the 2013 Kyiv Molodist International Film Festival. It was selected for the Forum at the 63rd Berlin International Film Festival.

== Filmography ==
Work	Year	Credit	Notes
The Weight of Elephants	2013	Direction	Feature
How to Say Goodbye	2012	Direction	Short fiction
Brainy	2011	Direction	Short fiction
The Woman Who Dreamt of a Man	2010	Grading	Feature
Freedom on Parole	2010	Grading	Feature
Sky	2010	Colorist	Short fiction
Berik	2010	Direction	Short fiction
When Heaven Falls	2009	Digital grading	Feature
Winnie and Karina	2009	Colorgrading	Feature
The Coach	2009	Grading	Short fiction
The Red Chapel	2009	Grading	Documentary
Lars and Peter	2009	Direction	Short fiction
Behaviour	2009	Direction	Short fiction
Flame & Citron	2008	Conforming	Feature
Young Man Falling	2008	Compositing	Short fiction
What No One Knows	2008	Compositing	Feature
The Cliffwood	2007	Compositing	Documentary
Manden og mågen	2007	Direction	Short fiction
Terapi	2006	Visual effects	Short fiction
