= Hryðjuverkamaður snýr heim =

Novel by Eiríkur Bergmann

First edition (publ. Sögur útgáfa)

Hryðjuverkamaðurinn snýr heim ('a terrorist turns for home'; Reykjavík: Sögur, 2015) is a novel by Eiríkur Bergmann.

== Summary ==
The novel is in the third person, and the narration is mostly from the perspective of the main character, Steingrímur Valur Orrason (known as Valur), though the perspective sometimes switches, particularly to Valur's friend and contemporary Rútur Björn Marínósson (born in 1968). The present time of the narrative runs from Spring 2008 to 6 October 2008. Much of the novel, however, comprises flashbacks to Valur's youth in the down-at-heel Reykjavík suburb of Breiðholt.

The flashbacks in the novel gradually reveal that Valur, Rútur and one Steinbjörn Eyjólfsson were friends together in Breiðholt and involved in minor criminal activity portrayed as characteristic of this rough suburb. However, they become interested in radical left-wing activism, gaining particular inspiration from the Red Army Faction. Their childhood escapades establish the depth of the friendship between Valur and Rútur, and Steinbjörn's tendency to lay plans but to stay away from the action itself. The escapades also establish their antagonism towards the main bully in their neighbourhood, Krummi krunk. Valur falls in love with and begins a relationship with a girl called Gerður.

The culmination of the radical activism of Valur, Rútur and Steinbjörn is a stunt whereby they photobomb the October 1986 Reykjavík Summit, raising a banner saying 'Destroy the fascist Soviet states of America!', while Valur threatens the assembly with a dummy M16 gun. Valur is shot and slightly wounded by a secret service agent and arrested, while a stray bullet hits another bodyguard in the eye. Valur escapes prosecution, however, by fleeing on his brother's passport to the East German part of Berlin, where the state later gives him a new identity, as Magnus Heinz. Rútur and Steinbjörn escape the attention of the police. In East Germany, Valur meets a new partner, a Polish radical socialist called Aldona, though after the fall of the Berlin Wall, Gerður visits briefly and has sex with Valur, leaving when she realises that Valur has a partner. Valur later has a child by Aldona called Lára. Valur's best friend in Berlin is Karl-Elke, whom he helps escape to West Germany, and who returns to East Berlin after the fall of the Berlin Wall to start a cafe.

In the present time of the novel, Valur returns to Iceland for the first time, still a wanted man, because Gerður reveals to him that he has a daughter by her, Kolbrá. Kolbrá, now 18, is in trouble, and Gerður hopes that Valur can help. It is evident that Valur and Gerður still have strong feelings for each other. Meanwhile, Rútur has become one of Iceland's leading financiers, heading up IS Capital, and Steinbjörn has become the populist leader of the Frelsisflokkurinn ('freedom party'). Valur tries to meet Kolbrá and establishes that she has joined a gang run by Krummi krunk (now a powerful criminal known as Tunglið ['the moon']). He follows Kolbrá on what turns out to be a break-in ordered by Krummi during which she steals a package from an Icelandic finance company called AUR Investment. Gradually Valur succeeds in developing a relationship with Kolbrá and learns that she dislikes her stepfather, Arngrímur. Meanwhile, Rútur and Steinbjörn follow up on a long-neglected promise to try to get Valur's charges dropped, and the reader becomes aware that they have some connection with Krummi's criminal activities.

Valur's presence in Iceland is leaked to the press, leading to the headline 'Hryðjuverkamaðurinn snýr heim' appearing in the paper. Rútur smuggles Valur and Kolbrá out of the country in his private jet. It emerges that Kolbrá has with her a package of cocaine that she was supposed to give to Krummi. Kolbrá meets Valur's family in Germany but absconds to return Krummi's drugs. Rútur then arranges Valur's return to Iceland so that he can sign an agreement with the state for his charges to be dropped.

Valur then takes Gerður and Kolbrá on a road trip to visit his dying mother in Neskaupstaður, borrowing a car from Rútur. The same day, Rútur's wife Hildur holds an extravagant and highly public fortieth birthday party for her reluctant husband. Realising that Hildur's present to Rútur is in the car, Valur tries to drop it at the party, but is recognised by Hildur, and flees. Rútur, fed up with the tedium of his life as a financier, joins Valur and the others on the road-trip. It is announced on national radio that Valur is wanted in connection with the break-in at AUR Investment.

Valur visits his mother; Kolbrá realises that Rútur and Steinbjörn are the ultimate power behind the break-in and drugs trafficking that Krummi has involved her in (the drugs being a sidenote to a theft of share-certificates); Rútur has sex with Gerður, who has realised she loves him more than she loves Valur; Kolbrá remonstrates with Rútur; and she and Valur turn themselves into the police. Valur is sentenced for both the break-in and his previous misdemeanours to a tough sentence of about a decade in prison; Kolbrá to one year; Rútur to three and a half; and Steinbjörn manages to avoid conviction. Rútur avoids imprisonment, however, by absconding.

The novel closes with Valur adjusting to life in prison and getting to know Kolbrá there; but Aldona, Karl-Elke, and Rútur manage a cunning break-out, and together with Valur take ship back to Germany. As they do so, Geir Haarde makes his famous Guð blessi Ísland speech, signalling the imminent collapse of Iceland's financial system.

== Reviews ==
- Friðrika Benónýsdóttir. "Hryðjuverk hjartans". Fréttablaðið 25 June 2015, p. 40.
- Valur Gunnarsson. „"Kveðjubréf til kalda stríðsins". DV.is 3 June 2015.
- "Hryðjuverkamaður snýr heim". Hrunið, þið munið: Gagnabanki um samtímasögu, [2015].
