= Torun Lian =

Norwegian playwright, film director and novelist

- Born: 15 January 1956 (age 70)
- Occupations: Playwright; Film director Novelist
- Awards: Tarjei Vesaas' debutantpris Nordic Children's Book Prize; Amanda Award; Ingmar Bergman Award

Torun Lian (born 15 January 1956) is a Norwegian playwright, film director and novelist. She made her literary début in 1988 with the collection Tre skuespill, for which she was awarded the Tarjei Vesaas' debutantpris. In 1995 she was awarded with the Nordic Children's Book Prize. Among her films are Bare skyer beveger stjernene from 1998, and Ikke naken, ikke kledt (engl. The Color of Milk) from 2000.

== Bibliography ==
The titles are in Norwegian:

- Tre skuespill – play (1988)
- Den som beveger seg langsomt beveger seg – play (1989)
- Frida – ungdomsbok (1990)
- Frida – med hjertet i hånden – youth novel (1991), collection of the Frida books published in 2000
- Lengtere – play (1994)
- Bare skyer beveger stjernene – youth novel (1994)
- Ikke naken ikke kledt – youth novel (2000)
- Adam den tredje i fjerde – children's book (2005)
- Undrene i vår familie – novel (2008)
- Alice Andersen – children's book (2014)
- Reserveprinsesse Andersen – children's book (2015)
- Alice svømmer ikke – children's book (2016)
- Alice og alt du ikke vet og godt er det – children's book (2017)

== Prizes ==
- Tarjei Vesaas' debutantpris 1988, for Tre skuespill (Three plays)
- Amanda Award for Best Screenplay (1990), for the TV-series Frida
- Prix Jeunesse, for the TV-series Frida
- Nordische Filmtage, main prize (1991), for Frida med hjertet i hånden
- Amanda Award for Best Screenplay (1991), for Frida med hjertet i hånden
- Amanda Award for Best Film (1991), for Frida med hjertet i hånden
- Nordic Children's Book Prize (1995), for Bare skyer beveger stjernene
- Amanda Award for Best Film (1998), for Bare skyer beveger stjernene
- Beste nordiske barnefilm (1998), for Bare skyer beveger stjernene
- Filmkriterprisen (1998), for Bare skyer beveger stjernene
- Telenor Culture Award (1999)
- Sonja Hagemanns Children's and Youth Book Prize 2000, for Ikke naken ikke kledt
- Ingmar Bergman Prize (2000)
- Amanda Prize for Best Screenplay 2010, for Vegas
