= Heiðrikur á Heygum =

Faroese musician and filmmaker (born 1983)

Heiðrikur á Heygum pronounced [ˈhaɪ:ɹɪkʊɹ ˈɔa ˈheɪ:jʊm] (born 1983 in Tórshavn), known by the stylised mononym HEIDRIK, is a Faroese artist who is currently based in Denmark as of 2020. His career has spanned multiple genres and mediums throughout his decades-long career.

== Art ==
In the realm of painting, Heiðrikur works mainly with watercolors, covering subjects such as parenthood, sexuality, social stigma involving guilt, shame and loneliness. Heiðrikur has also created cover art for albums from musicians such as Eivør, ORKA, Páll Finnur Páll, SAKARIS, Guðrið Hansdóttir and BYRTA.

== Film and music videos ==
Heiðrikur began his career in film in 2006 by directing a music video for his song Tár torna from his debut album An Invisible Gun (2006). Three years later, he directed his first short film Mítt Rúm in 2009. The short film premiered at the Faroese film festival in October 2008, and won awards at the Nordic Youth Film Festival (NUFF) and UNGFILM09, winning the Rasmus-Award in the latter case.

After graduating from Kort & Dokumentar Filmskolen in Denmark, he began working with advertising and commercials.

Heiðrikur graduated from the Danish film school Super16 in 2014 as director, afterwards studying at the Icelandic Academy of Fine Art.

He has directed music videos for other Faroese musicians, including Eivør, ORKA, SAKARIS and BYRTA.

In 2014, Heiðrikur directed the horror short film Skuld, which premiered in late 2014 and won both the Geytin Jury Award and the Audience Award. Skuld also won 2 Ekko Awards 2016 for best set design and best sound.

== Filmography ==
=== Short films ===
- 2009 – Mítt Rúm (My Room) (short film), Writer, Director and Editor.
- 2010 – Waves – A Portrait of Maria á Heygum, (short doc), Writer, Director and Editor.
- 2010 – Sigarett (Cigarette) (short film) Writer, Director, Actor and Editor.
- 2012 – "A Hipstory" (short film) Writer, Director.
- 2013 – True Love (short film) Writer, Director.
- 2014 – Skuld (Guilt) (short film) Director
- 2016 – Dalur (short film) Director
- 2019 – Annika (documentary) Director.

=== Television series ===
- 2008–2009 – Mús (television series): Co writer, reporter, editor and host. Made for the Faroese National Television (Kringvarp Føroya).

=== Music videos ===
- "Tár Torna" 2006 Heiðrikur, Writer, Director and Editor.
- "Needle and a String" 2011 Heiðrikur, Writer, Director and Editor.
- "Aldan reyð" 2011(music video) by ORKA. Writer, Director
- "Blonde" 2012 Heiðrikur, Writer, Director.
- "OMG" 2012 Heiðrikur, Writer, Director.
- "True Love" 2013 Eivør Pálsdóttir, Writer, Director
- "Nothing is Written in the Stars"2013 Bloodgroup., Writer, Director
- "Brace Myself" 2013 Sakaris, Writer, Director and Editor.
- "Norðlýsið" 2013 BYRTA, Writer, Director and Editor.
- "Bolimia" 2013 Heiðrikur, Writer, Director and Editor.
- "Tasty Tears" Heiðrikur feat Greta Svabo Bech 2013, Writer, Director and Editor.
- "Rain" 2014 Eivør Pálsdóttir, Writer, Director
- "Í tínum eygum" 2014 BYRTA, Writer, Director and Editor.
- "Andvekur" 2015 BYRTA, Writer, Director and Editor.
- "Aftur og Aftur" 2015 BYRTA, Director
- "Í Tokuni" 2016 Eivør Pálsdóttir, Writer, Director
- "Høbjærgning ved Havet" 2016 Graabrødre Kammerkor, Writer, Director and Editor.
- "Change of Frame" 2016 Heiðrikur, Writer, Director and Editor.
- "Red Hair" 2016 Heiðrikur, Writer, Director and Editor.
- "Boy" 2017 Heiðrikur, Writer, Director and Editor.
- "Høbjærgning ved Havet" 2017 Graabrødre Kammerkor, Writer, Director and Editor.
- "Risin og moggin" 2017 KATA, Writer, Director and Editor.
- "Monster" 2018 Heiðrikur, Writer, Director and Editor.
- "Remember Me" 2018 Heiðrikur, Writer, Director and Editor.
- "White Flag" 2018 Heiðrikur, Writer, Director and Editor.
- "Angel" Frostfelt 2018, Writer, Director and Editor.
- "Hennara dansigólv" 2018 BYRTA, Writer, Director and Editor.
- "Black for the Occasion" 2018 Heiðrikur, Writer, Director and Editor.
- "Green Wine" 2019 Janus Rasmussen, Writer, Director and Editor.
- "In the middle of the end of time" 2019 Pernille Rosendahl, Writer, Director and Editor.
- "Falla til jarðar" 2020 Marius Ziska, Writer, Director and Editor.
- "Break Up Song" 2020 Heiðrikur, Writer, Director and Editor.

=== Post productions ===
- 2008 – ORKA & YANN TIERSEN Live in Rennes (post production), Director and Editor.

== Music ==
In 2007, Heiðrikur released his debut album, An Invisible Gun .

In December 2013 Heiðrikur and Greta Svabo Bech collaborated on the song Tasty Tears.

After a 9-year hiatus, Heiðrikur released his 2nd album "Funeral" in 2016. Its first single, Change of Frame was released in August 2016.

On 27 March 2020 Heiðrikur released his 3rd album, Illusions.

== Discography ==
=== Albums ===
- 2007 – An Invisible Gun, December 2007
- 2016 – Funeral
- 2020 – Illusions

=== Singles ===
- 2007 – Jealous
- 2012 – OMG
- 2014 – Maria's Donkey
- 2016 – Change of Frame
- 2017 – Black for the Occasion (Radio Edit)
- 2020 – Hope You're Crying

== Art exhibitions ==
- 1996 and 1997 – Showed work at, Smiðjan í Lítluvík on the Faroe Islands
- 1998 – Showed work at, The Nordic House, Tórshavn, Faroe Islands
- 2005 – Solo exhibition, Smiðjan í Lítluvík, Tórshavn, Faroe Islands
- 1997, 2000, 2001, 2002, 2004, 2007, 2011, 2012 and 2013 – Selected to show works in the censured Faroese Summer Exhibition "Ólavsøkuframsýningin" at The National Faroese Art Museum)
- 2007 – Curated and showed worked at "Ólavsøkuframsýningin" (Faroese Summer Exhibition at The National Faroese Art Museum, named after Ólavsøka)
- 2010 – Curated and showed worked at Müllers Pakkhús in Tórshavn, an exhibition for young Faroese artist called Innrás (Invasion).
- 2012 – Curated and showed worked at Nordatlantens Brygge in Copenhagen
- 2015 – Showed work at Husumer Bucht Museum in Germany

== Awards and nominations ==
- 2009 – NUFF (Short film festival for young filmmakers in the Nordic countries) Wins for best short film Mítt Rúm (My Room)
- 2013 – Nominated for best music video at the Berlin Music Video Awards 2014 for Eivør – True Love
- 2014 – Geytin Award (a Faroese film award, a stuette and 25 0000 DKK)
- 2014 – Áskoðaravirðislønin (Audience award of 15 000 DKK, handed at the same event as the Geytin Award)
- 2014 – Nominated for the Faroese Music Awards for the music video Byrta – Norðlýsið, instructor: Heiðrikur á Heygum
- 2014 – Nominated for the Faroese Music Awards for the music video Eivør – True Love, instructor: Heiðrikur á Heygum
- 2015 – Faroese Music Awards – Wins for best music video (Eivør – Rain), instructor: Heiðrikur
- 2016 – "Skuld" (Guilt) was nominated in 5 categories at Danish Ekko Awards and won 2. Best set Design and sound
- 2017 – Won "Best male singer" at the Faroese Music Awards 2017
- 2018 – Won "Best music video" for "Monster" at the Faroese Music Awards 2018
