= Ertu Guð, afi? =

2010 novel by Þorgrímur Þráinsson

Ertu Guð, afi? (Are You God, Granddad?) is an Icelandic children's novel by Þorgrímur Þráinsson. It won the 2010 Icelandic Children's Book Prize, which guarantees publication with the Vaka-Helgafell press. It is Þorgrímur's twenty-fourth book, and his second to win the prize.

== Plot summary ==
The novel is a first-person narrative from the point of view of the lively and restless Emma Soffía, who for most of the narrative is eleven years old. It starts with news that her paternal grandfather, known to Emma Soffía as Afi Afríka ('Grandad Africa'), will return to Iceland from living in Africa for the first time in eleven years. The novel charts the developing relationship between the narrator and her grandfather over the course of about a year, and how it changes her relationship with her mother (prone to grumpiness, consumerism, and sometimes disinclined to show Emma Soffía the affection that she feels), her father (who is a seaman and therefore absent for long stretches of time), and with herself. Afi Afríka is given to mediation, offering spiritual insights and experiences, and to finding pastimes for his granddaughter which entertain her yet help her to develop patience and inner piece. The novel closes with Afi Afríka's death, Catholic funeral, and his bequest to Emma Soffía of his elegant home near Landakotskirkja.

== Critical reception ==
In the estimation of Helga Birgisdóttir and María Bjarkadóttir, 'the message is clear and good: think beautiful thoughts, conduct yourself well, and be good to people and animals. This is a beautiful book but the message is often repeated to the reader, who is rather confused when the book ends on a "boom-time" note: the main character inherits a penthouse flat'.
