= Icelandic Children's Book Prize =

Icelandic literary award

- Native name: Íslensku barnabókaverðlaunin
- Description: Annual literary prize awarded for an unpublished manuscript of a children's story or illustrated book
- Country: Iceland
- Presented by: Verðlaunasjóður íslenskra barnabóka

The Icelandic Children's Book Prize (Íslensku barnabókaverðlaunin) is a literary prize which is awarded annually (when sufficiently good entries present themselves) by the Verðlaunasjóði íslenskra barnabóka, established by the author Ármann Kr. Einarsson in conjunction with the publisher Vaka-Helgafell in 1985. The prize is awarded for an unpublished manuscript of a story for children and young people or for an illustrated children's book, published in the preceding year. The winning book is then published by Vaka-Helgafell (now part of Forlagið) during the autumn. On two occasions (1995 and 2006), two books have won the award.

== Winners ==
- 2026 - Matthildur Yrsa Sigurðardóttir، Þórunn Rakel Gylfadóttir، Didda Flygenring، Síðasti dagurinn
- 2025 - Birna Daníelsdóttir، Ég bý í risalandi
- 2021 - Ólafur Gunnar Guðlaugsson، Ljósberi
- 2020 - Rut Guðnadóttir، Vampírur, vesen og annað tilfallandi
- 2019 - Snæbjörn Arngrímsson، Rannsóknin á leyndardómum eyðihússins
- 2018 - Birkir Blær Ingólfsson، Stormsker
- 2017 - Elísa Jóhannsdóttir with Er ekki allt í lagi með þig? (What‘s Wrong With You?)
- 2016 - Inga M. Beck with Skóladraugurinn (The School Ghost)
- 2015 - Ragnheiður Eyjólfsdóttir with Skuggasaga – Arftakinn (A Story of Shadows – The Successor)
- 2014 - Guðni Líndal Benediktsson with Leitin að Blóðey (The Search for Blood-Isle)
- 2013 - No prize awarded because no entry was strong enough.
- 2012 - Kjartan Yngvi Björnsson og Snæbjörn Brynjarsson, Hrafnsauga
- 2011 - Bryndís Björgvinsdóttir, Flugan sem stöðvaði stríðið
- 2010 - Þorgrímur Þráinsson, Ertu Guð, afi?
- 2009 - Guðmundur Brynjólfsson, Þvílík vika
- 2008 - Gunnar Theodór Eggertsson, Steindýrin
- 2007 - Hrund Þórsdóttir, Loforðið
- 2006 - Margrét Tryggvadóttir og Halldór Baldursson, Sagan af undurfögru prinsessunni og hugrakka prinsinum hennar
- 2006 - Héðinn Svarfdal Björnsson, Háski og hundakjöt
- 2005 - No prize awarded because no entry was strong enough.
- 2004 - Brynhildur Þórarinsdóttir, Leyndardómur ljónsins
- 2003 - Yrsa Sigurðardóttir, Biobörn
- 2002 - Harpa Jónsdóttir, Ferðin til Samiraka
- 2001 - Gunnhildur Hrólfsdóttir, Sjáumst aftur...
- 2000 - Ragnheiður Gestsdóttir, Leikur á borði
- 1999 - No prize awarded because no entry was strong enough.
- 1998 - Guðmundur Ólafsson, Heljarstökk afturábak
- 1997 - Þorgrímur Þráinsson, Margt býr í myrkrinu
- 1996 - Ingibjörg Möller, Grillaðir bananar
- 1995 - Herdís Egilsdóttir, Veislan í barnavagninum
- 1995 - Þórey Friðbjörnsdóttir, Eplasneplar
- 1994 - Guðrún Hafdís Eiríksdóttir, Röndóttir spóar
- 1993 - Elías Snæland Jónsson, Brak og brestir
- 1992 - Friðrik Erlingsson, Benjamín dúfa
- 1991 - Iðunn Steinsdóttir, Gegnum þyrnigerðið
- 1990 - Karl Helgason, Í pokahorninu
- 1989 - Heiður Baldursdóttir, Álagadalurinn
- 1988 - Kristín Loftsdóttir, Fugl í búri
- 1987 - Kristín Steinsdóttir, Franskbrauð með sultu
- 1986 - Guðmundur Ólafsson, Emil og Skundi

== See also ==
- Nordic Council Children and Young People's Literature Prize
- West Nordic Council's Children and Youth Literature Prize
