= Marjun Syderbø Kjelnæs =

Faroese poet, playwright and novelist

Marjun Syderbø Kjelnæs (born 1974) is a Faroese poet, playwright and novelist.

She is the author of several works in different genres. Among these are her two novels Óendaliga vera (2016) and Marta, Marta (2024) as well as her three collections of poems: Karmageitin (2022) Rót Tripp (2012) and Opna (2016). Her two stage plays Gentukamarið (2022) and Tóm Rúm (2014) both premiered on the Faroese national scene. In 2016 the play Tóm rúm was chosen to be a part of the Nordic Drama Train. Her novel Skriva í sandin is a contemporary book for young adults, taking place in Kjelnæs's hometown of Tórshavn.

She wrote lyrics and cooperated with singer Eivør Pálsdóttir and DR Big Band on the musical composition At the Heart of a Selkie. (2016) Lyrics for Eivør include among others: Jarðartrá, Upp úr øskuni, Purpurhjarta, Enn, Gaia, Ein klóta, Verð mín, Salt, Slør, Elskaði, Mánasegl, Gullspunnin, Stirdur saknur, The Swing.

Recent work includes the novel Óendaliga vera, published in 2016, and the script for the film Dreams by the sea, directed by Sakaris Stórá and released in 2017. In 2020 she published the contemporary novel Sum rótskot, which is a novel for young adults. It is about four young people from Tórshavn, who are environmental activists. They arrange a School strike for climate in front of the Faroese parliament, Løgtingið. The story is told by the two girls Fríða and Miriam. They take the matter into their own hands, but it has unforeseen consequences.

Kjelnæs has been nominated for and has received both national and international awards, and some of her work has been translated into the other Nordic languages, as well as into English, German and French.

== Bibliography ==
- 2000 Russiskur dansur, short story in the anthology Russiskur dansur
- 2001 Kópakona, short story in the anthology Mjørki í heilum
- 2002 Trongd, radio drama
- 2004 Ein farri av kolvetni, collection of short stories
  - 2006 Die Kette (Ketan) in German translation in the short story anthology Von Inseln weiss ich…, published by Unionsverlag
- 2006 Tað svarta portrið, short story published in Mín jólabók
- 2007 Og tú fert rennandi, poem, published in the Faroese magazine Vencil Vol. 2
- 2007 Hvør fjalir seg í postkassanum, children's book, published by BFL
- 2008 Hvør fjalir seg í ferðataskuni, children's book, published by BFL
- 2009 Hvør fjalir seg í smúkkuskríninum, children's book, published by BFL
- 2010 Skriva í sandin, YA novel, published by Bókadeild Føroya Lærarafelags
  - 2010 Skriva í sandin published in the Nordic short story anthology Elskar - elskar ikki
  - 2012 Ecrire dans le sable (Skriva í sandin) in French translation in the short story anthology Nouvelles Pays Nordiques, which means Short Stories from the Nordic Countries.
  - 2012 Skriv i sandet, in Danish translation by Hugin Eide, Torgard (Publishing House)
  - 2014 Skriv i sanden, in Norwegian translation by Lars Moa, Samlaget
  - 2015 Skrifa i sandinn, in Icelandic translation, Bókaormurin
- 2012 Eg undrist, At týða týdningin, Allar línur spennast, Vit hava hits áður. Poems published in the Faroese literature magazine Vencil, vol. 11
- 2012 Rót Trip - poems, Sprotin.
  - 2014 Root Trip, in English translation by Marita Thomsen
  - 2015 Rot Trip, in Norwegian translation by Lars Moa, Bokbyen forlag
- 2014 Tóm rúm (Empty rooms), play, Sprotin, 978-99972-1-041-8 The play opened in February 2014 in Tórshavn on Tjóðpallur Føroya.
- 2016 At the heart of a Selkie, CD, poems written for musical work by Eivør Pálsdóttir and composer Peter Jensen.
- 2016 Opna - poems, Sprotin
- 2016 Óendaliga vera, novel, Bókadeild Føroya Lærarafelags
- 2017 Dreams by the sea. Film, directed by Sakaris Stórá
- 2020 Sum rótskot, YA novel, Bókadeild Føroya Lærarafelags
- 2022 "Karmageitin" poems. Ungu Føroyar
- 2022 "Gentukamarið" play. Ungu Føroyar

== Recognition ==
- 2000 Award in Dimmalætting short story competition
- 2001 Listastevna Føroya, 2. prize
- 2002 Listastevna Føroya, 1. prize
- 2004 Grant from the Faroese fond Grunnur Thorvalds Poulsen av Steinum
- 2008 Barnabókaheiðursløn Tórshavnar býráðs
- 2008 Award in a YA short story competition
- 2011 White Raven Deutsche Jugendbibliothek for her book Skriva í sandin
- 2011 Nordic Children's Book Prize from the Nordic School Librarian Association for her book Skriva í sandin
- 2012 West Nordic Council's Children and Youth Literature Prize (nominated)
- 2013 Nordic Council Children and Young People's Literature Prize (nominated)
- 2015 Tann føroyska bókhandlaravirðislønin (The Faroese Book Shop Award)
- 2017 FMA, The Faroese Music Award for best lyrics.
- 2020 Barnamentanarheiðursløn Tórshavnar Býráðs
- 2021 Nordic Council Children and Young People's Literature Prize (nominated)
