= Nordic Children's Book Prize =

The Nordic Children's Book Prize (Danish: Nordisk Skolebibliotekarforenings Børnebogspris also called Nordisk Børnebogspris) is a children's literary prize which was established in 1985 by the Nordic Association of School Librarians (Nordisk Skolebibliotekarforening). The winners received an amount of money and a diploma.

The award was superseded by the Nordic Council Children and Young People's Literature Prize.

== The Winners of the Nordic Children's Book Prize ==
Year	Prize winner	Country
2013	Jo Salmson and Natalia Batista (illustrator)	Sverige
2011	Marjun Syderbø Kjelnæs	Faroe Islands
2009	Stian Hole	Norway
2007	Brynhildur Þórarinsdóttir	Iceland
2006	Erik Newth	Norway
2005	Ragnheiður Gestsdóttir	Iceland
2004	Lene Kaaberbøl	Denmark
2003	Kristín Steinsdóttir	Iceland
2002	Thore Hansen	Norway
2001	Edward Fuglø	Faroe Islands
2000	Bent Haller	Denmark
1999	Annika Thor	Sweden
1998	Ulf Stark	Sweden
1997	Lars-Henrik Olsen	Denmark
1996	Louis Jensen	Denmark
1995	Torun Lian	Norway
1995	Viveca Lärn Sundvall	Sweden
1994	Torill Thorstad Hauger	Norway
1993	Bjarne Reuter	Denmark
1992	Gudrun Helgadóttir	Iceland
1991	Ólavur Michelsen	Faroe Islands
1991	Erik Hjorth Nielsen	Denmark
1990	Mats Wahl	Sweden
1989	Svend Otto S.	Denmark
1988	Mette Newth	Norway
1987	Kaarina Helakisa	Finland
1986	Tormod Haugen	Norway
1985	Maria Gripe	Sweden
