= Bryndís Björgvinsdóttir =

Icelandic author and folklorist

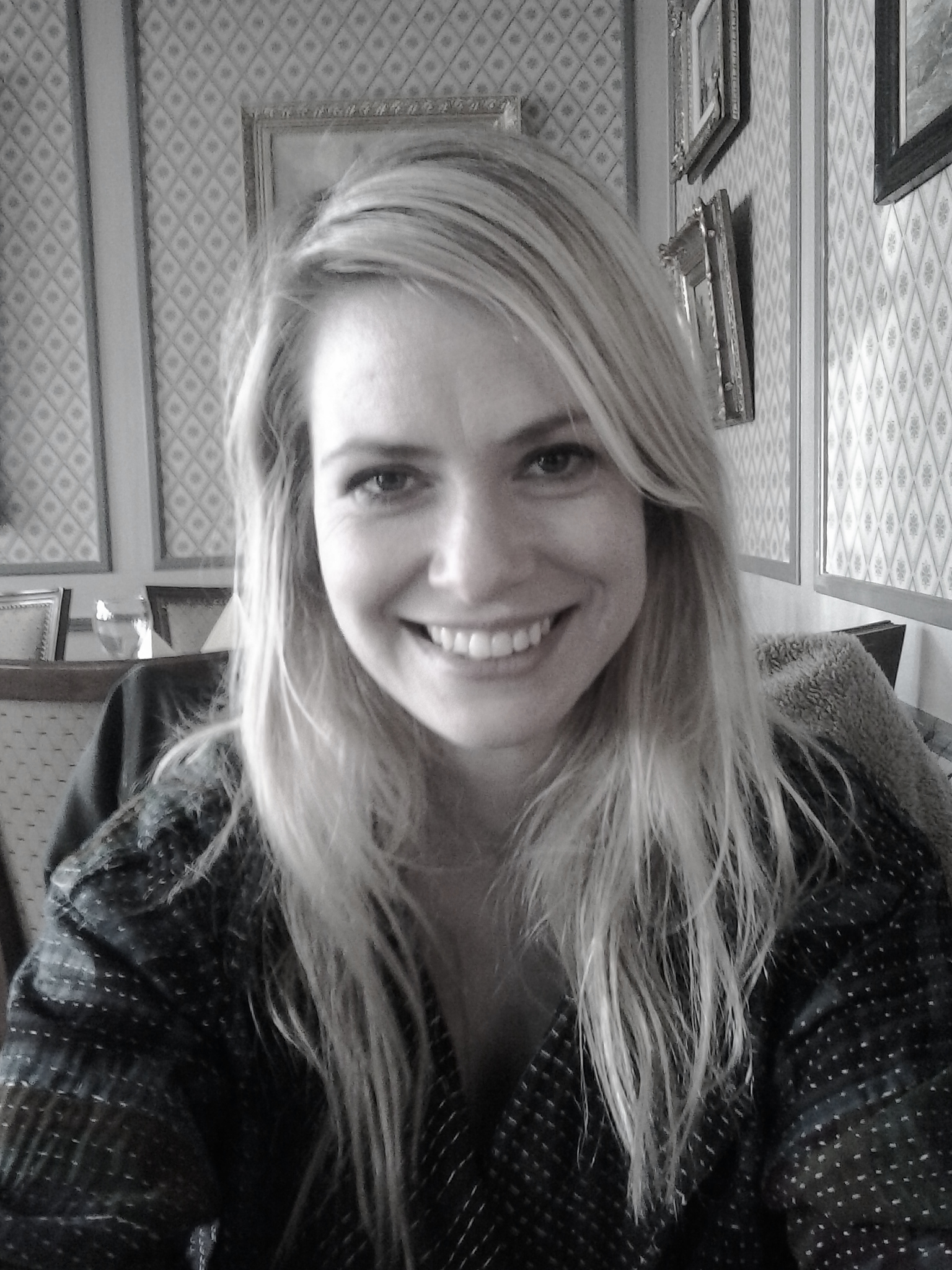
Author Bryndís Björgvinsdóttir

Bryndís Björgvinsdóttir (born 24 March 1982) is an Icelandic author and folklorist.

== Career ==
She started her writing career at fifteen when she co-authored the book Orðabelgur Ormars ofurmennis (The Wordballoon of Worm Wonderman). In 2011, she published her second book, the children's book Flugan sem stöðvaði stríðið (The Fly Who Ended the War) which won the Icelandic Children's Book Prize (2011). In 2014, she published the young adult book Hafnfirðingabrandarinn (The Local Joke) which won both the Icelandic Literary Prize (2014) and the Icelandic Women's Literature Prize (or Fjöruverðlaunin 2014).

Bryndís is an adjunct professor at Iceland Academy of the Arts.

== Activism ==
In 2015, Bryndís, using social media, has actively encouraged the Icelandic government and Icelandic people to help out and open their homes for fleeing Syrian refugees, during the Syrian Civil War. The call for activism has helped the Icelandic government to rethink their immigrant policies.

== See also ==
- List of Icelandic writers
- Icelandic literature
