= Jonas Poher Rasmussen =

Danish filmmaker (born 1981)

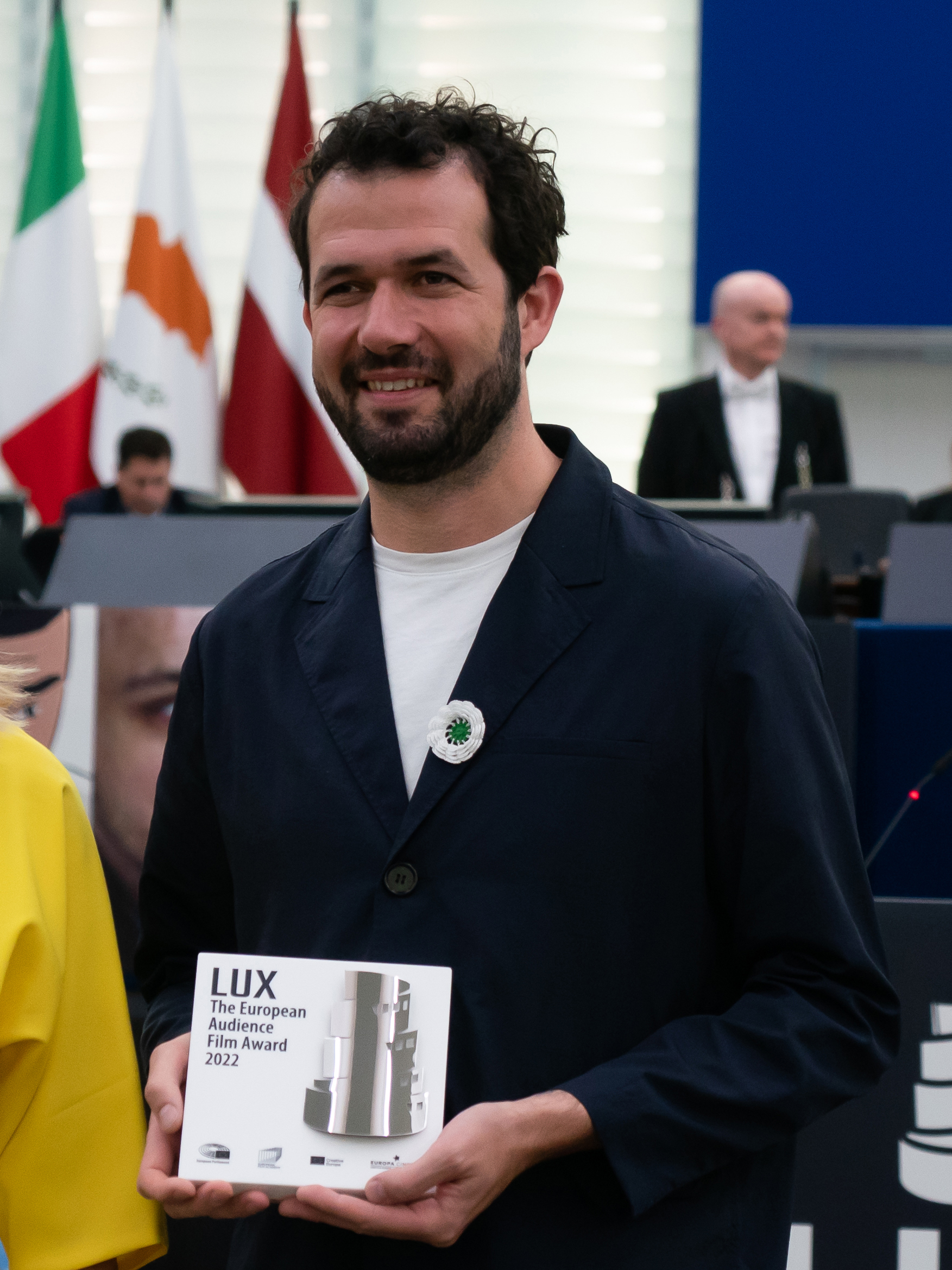
- Rasmussen in the 2022 Lux Audience Award
- Born: 19 May 1981 (age 45); Kalundborg, Denmark
- Citizenship: Denmark; France
- Education: Super16
- Alma mater: University of Zurich
- Occupations: Producer, Director
- Known for: Flee
- Awards: Annecy Cristal for a Feature Film (Flee)

Jonas Poher Rasmussen (born 19 May 1981) is a Danish filmmaker. Most known for his animated documentary film Flee (2021), which received three nominations for the Best Documentary Feature, Best International Film and Best Animated Feature at the 94th Academy Awards.

== Life and career ==
He is originally from Kalundborg. From 2007 to 2010 Jonas attended the Danish independent film school Super16.

He previously directed the short films Easa 2002: A Journey to Vis (2003), Something About Halfdan (2006), Closed Doors (2008), The Day After (2009) and House of Glass (2010), and the feature documentaries Searching for Bill (2012) and What He Did (2015).

== Flee ==
The 2021 animated documentary film Flee tells the story of his friend Amin, an Afghan refugee in Denmark, and was one of the most highly acclaimed and award-winning films of 2021.

Following Flee, Rasmussen signed with United Talent Agency and Anonymous Content to develop new projects. His first announced new project is based on the graphic novels of Danish writer Halfdan Pisket.

== Filmography ==
=== Feature films ===
Year	English title	Original title	Notes
2012	Searching for Bill		Documentary
2015	What He Did	Det han gjorde	Documentary
2021	Flee	Flugt	Documentary
TBA	Dansker		Post-production

=== Short films ===
Year	Title	Credit
2003	Easa 2002: A Journey to Vis	Also executive producer, cinematographer, and editor
2006	Noget om Halfdan	Also executive producer and carpenter
2008	Closed Doors	
2009	The Day After	
2010	Et hus af glas	Director, Writer

=== Other credits ===
Year	Title	Credit
2009	Ønskebørn	Assistant Director
2009	Bobby	Location Scout
2011	Room 304	Assistant Director

== Accolades ==
His film Flee was nominated for Best Animated Feature, Best International Film and Best Documentary Feature at the 94th Academy Awards, a first in Oscar history.
