= Bye Bye Bluebird =

- Front cover of the DVD
- Directed by: Katrin Ottarsdóttir
- Written by: Katrin Ottarsdóttir
- Produced by: Annette Nørregaard
- Starring: Hildigunn Eyðfinsdóttir; Sigri Mitra Gaïni
- Cinematography: Jørgen Johansen
- Edited by: Elisabet Ronaldsdóttir
- Music by: Hilmar Örn Hilmarsson
- Distributed by: Peter Bech Film
- Release date: 30 July 1999
- Running time: 97 minutes
- Countries: Denmark; Faroe Islands
- Languages: Faroese; Danish; English; French

Bye Bye Bluebird is a 1999 Danish-Faroese comedy-drama road movie directed by Katrin Ottarsdóttir and starring Hildigunn Eyðfinsdóttir and Sigri Mitra Gaïni. The satirical film relates the tale of two eccentric young women who, after years abroad, return to their native Faroe Islands, and embark on a strange road trip. The film received awards at several film festivals including Lübeck Nordic Film Festival, Rouen Nordic Film Festival and the International Film Festival Rotterdam.

== Cast ==
- Hildigunn Eyðfinsdóttir as Rannvá
- Sigri Mitra Gaïni as Barba
- Johan Dalsgaard as Rúni
- Elin K. Mouritsen as Barba's mother
- Peter Hesse Overgaard as Rannvá's stepfather
- Nora Bærentsen as Rannvá's mother
- Egi Dam as Rannvá's father
- Lovisa Køtlum Petersen as Rannvá's daughter
- Adelborg Linklett as Rannvá's grandmother
- Sverri Egholm as Rannvá's grandfather
- Birita Mohr as Waitress / Singer
- Sjúrður Sólstein as Smukke
- Høgni Johansen as Helmsman
- Kári Øster as Hærget Mand
- Anna Kristin Bæk as Blafferpige
