= Atlantic Rhapsody =

- Directed by: Katrin Ottarsdóttir
- Starring: Páll Danielsen; Erling Eysturoy; Elin K. Mouritsen; Katrin Ottarsdóttir
- Music by: Heðin Meitil
- Release date: 1989
- Running time: 80 minutes
- Country: Faroe Islands
- Language: Faroese

Atlantic Rhapsody is a 1989 Faroese film by Katrin Ottarsdóttir. The original Faroese title is Atlantic Rhapsody - 52 myndir úr Tórshavn, where the second part means "52 pictures from Tórshavn". The film presents a day in the life of some inhabitants of Tórshavn, the capital of the Faroe Islands. The narrative is structured as a relay race, in which a person, a thing or something out of a scene brings the audience into another scene with new people and events. It is the first ever Faroese feature-length film.

== Synopsis ==
A trip through 24 hours of the smallest capital in the world, Tórshavn, the film begins with a father and a daughter who are having breakfast when some fire trucks drive by. A woman and her child are looking at the fire and meet a married couple. The couple say hello to a man who is going out with his boat etc. Out of this emerges a kaleidoscopic story of both daily occurrences and dramatic situations, which in an entertaining and ironic way acts as a commentary on the Faroese, foreigners in the islands, as well as Faroese society in general.

== Production ==
Atlantic Rhapsody is the first feature film ever to be produced in the Faroes. It was created on a budget of 1.7 million DKR. The film was created in response to an announcement that a Nordic film festival was due to be held in the Faroe Islands, with the director arguing it would be appropriate to produce a Faroese film that could be shown at the festival.

== Reception ==
A review in The New York Times described the film's depiction of Tórshavn as "at times mildly surprising [...] and well rounded as long as it sustains its ties with reality".

In 1989, the film received the prize of the Nordische Filminstitute at the film festival Nordische Filmtage in Lübeck.
