= Maybe I Should Have =

2010 Icelandic film

Maybe I should have: Frásögn af efnahagsundrinu Íslandi
- Directed by: Gunnar Sigurðsson
- Written by: Gunnar Sigurðsson, Lilja Skaptadóttir, Herbert Sveinbjörnsson, Jón Gustafsson, Valgeir Skagafjörð
- Produced by: Lilja Skaftadóttir
- Edited by: Herbert Sveinbjörnsson
- Distributed by: Argout Film
- Release date: January 2010
- Running time: 95 minutes
- Country: Iceland
- Language: Icelandic

Maybe I Should Have: Frásögn af efnahagsundrinu Íslandi ('The Story of the Economic Wonder, Iceland') is an Icelandic documentary film directed by Gunnar Sigurðsson about the causes and effects of the 2008–2012 Icelandic financial crisis.

The film touches on a variety of subjects including finance, corruption, cronyism, nepotism, the privatisation of the Icelandic banking system, tax havens, connections between politics and business, the Kitchenware Revolution, the Citizens' movement, and how the Icelandic government reacted to warning signs leading up to the collapse of the banking system in 2008.

People who are interviewed include Björgólfur Thor Björgólfsson, William K. Black, Robert Wade, employees at Transparency International, Eva Joly and Jón Baldvin Hannibalsson. In their search for answers the filmmakers travel extensively and among the locations they visit are London, Guernsey, Luxembourg and Road Town in The British Virgin Islands.

Musicians who contributed to the film include Fjallabræður, Magnús Þór Sigmundsson, Hjálmar and KK.

The film has been generally well received by critics.
