= Jørgen Johansen =

Danish footballer (1928-1994)

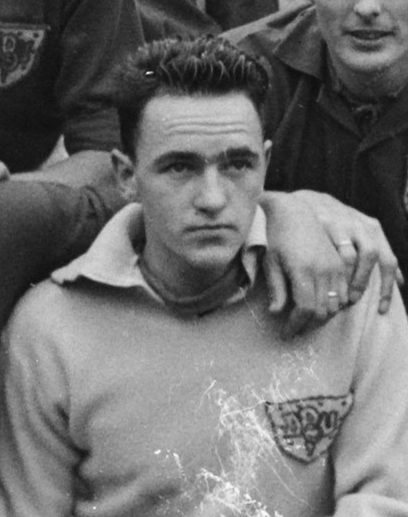
- Jørgen Johansen, September 1952

Personal information
- Date of birth: 24 February 1928
- Date of death: 6 November 1994 (aged 66)
- Position: Goalkeeper

Senior career*
Years	Team	Apps	(Gls)
- KB
- * Club domestic league appearances and goals

Jørgen Johansen (24 February 1928 – 6 November 1994) was a Danish footballer who competed in the 1952 Summer Olympics.
