= Geytin =

Faroese film festival

Geytin is an annual Faroese film festival in the Nordic House in Tórshavn where two Geytin film prizes are handed. The festival was established in 2012. The prizes are given to a Faroese film instructor for a short film, which is no longer than 30 minutes.

== The name of the Geytin-award ==
The main prize is named after Herálvur Geyti, who was better known as Geytin. Geytin travelled around the Faroe Islands in 1960s and 1970s, before cinemas or TV were common in the islands.

== The two film awards ==
There are two prizes, both are handed at en event in the Nordic House. From 2012 until 2016 they were handed in December, since 2018 they have been handed in February. The main prize, Geytin, is 30 000 DKK and a statuette, depicting the original person Geytin, the statuette is designed by Astrid Andreassen and Dávur Geyti. The other prize is 25 000 DKK and is given by Tórshavn City Council, it is an audience award, where the audience decides which film is winning. The first time the prizes were handed was on 11 December 2012 at a film festival called Geytin, in the Nordic House in Tórshavn where all the nominated films were shown. Sakaris Stórá from Skopun won the first Geytin film prize for the short movie for Summarnátt (Summer Night), and Annika á Lofti won the Audience Award (Faroese: Áskoðaravirðislønin) for the film Mist.

== Award winners ==
=== Winners of Geytin ===
- 2012 - Summarnátt, director: Sakaris Stórá
- 2013 - Terminal, director: Dávur Djurhuus
- 2014 - Skuld, director: Heiðrikur á Heygum
- 2015 - Stina Karina, director: Andrias Høgenni
- 2016 - Et knæk, director: Andrias Høgenni
- 2018 - 111 góðir dagar, director: Trygvi Danielsen
- 2019 - Ikki illa meint, director: Andrias Høgenni
- 2020 - Hví eru vit her?, directors: Búi Dam & Dánjal á Neystabø

=== Winners of the Audience Award (Áskoðaravirðislønin) ===
- 2012 - Mist, director: Annika á Lofti
- 2013 - Munch, director: Jónfinn Stenberg
- 2014 - Skuld, director: Heiðrikur á Heygum (Skuld means Guilt)
- 2015 - Tunnan, directors: Jónfinn Stenberg and Jóannes Lamhauge (Tunnan means the Barrel)
- 2016 - Et knæk, director: Andrias Høgenni
- 2018 - Maðurin við Blæuni, director: Maria Tórgarð
- 2019 - Omman, director: Julia í Kálvalíð
- 2020 - Trøllabeiggi, director: Gudmund Helmsdal

== Nominated films ==
=== Nominated films in 2020 ===
The films are from 2019.

- Við fyrsta eygnabrá - Esther á Fjallinum - (11:30 min.)
- Verkir (episode 1 of 3) - Theresa Jákupsdóttir & Karina Jákupsdóttir - (23:29 min.)
- Hví eru vit her? - Búi Dam & Dánjal á Neystabø - (22:00 min.)
- Ósøgd orð - Young people from the sommer film school Nóllywood 2019 - (9:49 min.)
- Trøllabeiggi - Gudmund Helmsdal - (30:00 min.)
- The River - Atli Brix Kamban 2019 - (3:31 min.)
- Smoothie Baby - Young people from the sommer film school Nóllywood 2019, short animation film - (1:40 min.)
- Vit/Kenslur - Young people from the sommer film school Nóllywood 2019, documentary - (13:53 min.)

=== Nominated films in 2019 ===
- 12 - Hanna Davidsen and Mikkjal Davidsen.
- Góðastova - Maria Guldbrandsø Tórgarð
- Omman - Julia í Kálvalíð
- Ikki illa meint - Andrias Høgenni
- Julians Stigi - Atli Brix Kamban
- Annika - Heiðrik á Heygum
- Tyggigummi - Gudmund Helmsdal
- Et visit - Sára Wang

=== Nominated films in 2018 ===
The awards were handed on 24 February 2018.

- Myndamálarin - Gudmund Helmsdal
- 111 góðir dagar - Trygvi Danielsen
- Skóhorn(y) - Sóley Danielsen og Gudmund Helmsdal
- Fisherman - Franklin Henriksen
- Frosthvarv - Franklin Henriksen
- Maðurin við Blæuni - Maria Tórgarð
- Collision Course - Rói Davidsen
- Sorte Hunde - Atli Brix Kamban
- Wünder Pitsa - Hanus Johannessen

=== Nominated films in 2016 ===
- Óttafet - Nóllywood, short film
- Nattens Stjerner - Atli Brix Kamban, short film
- Frávik - Maria G. Tórgarð, short film
- Bittersweet - Rói Davidsen, short film
- Marra - Hans Kristian Eyðunsson Hansen og Torfinnur Jákupsson, short film
- Ramblers - Hanus Johannessen, short film
- Et knæk - Andrias Høgenni, short film

=== Nominated films in 2015 ===
- Alda - Franklin Henriksen and Rúna Ingunardóttir, short film, 7:15 min
- At liva við tí - Ása Pálsdóttir and Rebekka Eliasen, documentary, 10:17 min
- Birting - Leo Lávík, short film, 10:14 min
- Mítt navn er Adam - Rói Davidsen, 3D animation film, 5:30 min
- Gakk tú tryggur - Dávur Djurhuus, short film, 4:00 min
- Tunnan - Jónfinn Stenberg and Jóannes Lamhauge, short film, 28:00 min
- Slitið saman - Sára Wang and Maria Winther Olsen, short film, 8:00 min
- Boys - Sunniva Sundby and Julia í Kálvalíð, documentary, 6:45 min
- Stina Karina - Andrias Høgenni, short film, 10:00 min
- Dalur - Heiðrikur á Heygum, short film, 30:00 min

=== Nominated films in 2014 ===
- Risin og Kellingin, stop motion film, Helga Djurhuus 4:23
- Det mand ikke taler om, hybrid-documentary, Andrias Høgenni 25:00
- Just another day, documentary, Petra Eliasardóttir Mikkelsen, 5:51
- Sum einglar vit falla, short film, Maria Winther Olsen, 28:00
- Autopilot, animation film, Rói Davidsen, 6:00
- Gongdin, short film, young people from Nollywood (film workshop in Nólsoy), 5:46
- Kom og dansa, tragic comedy, Andrias Høgenni, 14:00
- Fall for Ewe, poetic documentary, Høgni Mohr & Jens Jákup Hansen, 2:29
- Podróżnik, short film, Franklin Henriksen, 4:48
- Skuld, horror movie, Heiðrikur á Heygum, 30:00

=== Nominated films in 2013 ===
- Tú, music video - Jóannes Lamhauge
- Terminal, short film - Dávur Djurhuus
- Eina, short film - Andrias Høgenni
- True Love, short film - Heiðrik á Heygum
- Vetrarmorgun, short film - Sakaris Stórá
- Munsch, short film - Jónfinn Stenberg
- Byrta, music profile - Uni L. Hansen
- Lítla Ljósið, animation film - Hans Kristian E. Hansen
