= Sakaris Stórá =

Faroese film director and screenwriter

Sakaris Stórá (born 28 July 1986 in Skopun) is a Faroese film director and screenwriter. In December 2012, he won the first public Faroese film award, Geytin. In 2025, his film The Last Paradise on Earth became the first Faroese film to win the Nordic Council Film Prize.

== Biography ==
Sakaris Stórá was born and grew up in the small village of Skopun on the island of Sandoy. As a boy, he dreamt of making films, but before he could realize his dreams, he went to work for three years in the local fish factory in Skopun. He moved to Norway in 2005 to learn how to make films. He spent a year studying film and video at the Agder Folkehøgskole, located outside Kristiansand. He was then accepted by the Nordland Kunst- og Filmfagskole in Lofoten in the North of Norway, where he studied for two years (2008–2009). His thesis at this school was the short film Passasjeren ("The Passenger"). He made another short film at the same school with the title Ikaros.

Sakaris Stórá was the daily leader of the Faroese film workshop Klippfisk from August 2009 until March 2010. In the autumn and winter of 2012, he worked as a teacher on Føroya Fólkaháskúli.

His short film Summarnátt ("Summer Night," which he directed and wrote in 2012) has been shown in the Faroe Islands, in Odense, Hollywood and at the Nordic Film Festival in Lübeck.

In September 2013 Stórá's short film Vetrarmorgun ("Winter Morning"), had its first showing on the local library in the village of Sandur on the island of Sandoy. A few days later the film was shown in the Nordic House in Tórshavn and at the Faroese National Theatre (Tjóðpallur Føroya). The film was produced by Ingun í Skrivarastovu.

In 2014 Vetrarmorgun was invited to the Berlin International Film Festival, which was held from 6 to 16 February 2014. Stórá said he had tried to tell a story about being faithful to and accepting oneself. The film was made on a small budget and with as few people as possible. Vetrarmorgun was nominated in three categories at the Berlin International Film Festival, and on 14 April 2014 the film won The Special Prize of the Generation 14plus International Jury.

In 2014 grants for filmmaking were part of the Faroese Government Budget for the first time. 22 applied for a grant and nine received one, with the grants making a total of 485,000 DKK ($86,000). Sakaris Stórá received 40,000 DKK ($7,000) for work on a new screenplay. Ingun í Skrivarastovu received 45,000 DKK ($8,000) for promotion of Stórá's two short films Summarnátt and Vetrarmorgun.

In 2025, his second feature film, The Last Paradise on Earth (Seinasta paradís á jørð), was released. It became the first Faroese film to win the Nordic Council Film Prize. The Nordic Council cited the film's portrayal of remote island life and its themes of grief, ecological crisis, and reconnection.

== Filmography ==
=== Feature films ===
- 2025 – The Last Paradise on Earth (Seinasta paradís á jørð) – director, screenwriter.
- 2017 – Dreymar við havið (Dreams by the Sea), manuscript: Marjun Syderbø Kjelnæs, language: Faroese, length 1 hour and 20 minutes. Main characters: Helena Heðinsdóttir, Juliett Nattestad.

=== Short films ===
- 2008 – Ikaros, 2008, length: 7 min. (writer, director)
- 2009 – Passasjeren ("The Passenger"), language: Norwegian, length: 9 min. (writer, director)
- 2012 – Summarnátt ("Summer Night"), language: Faroese, length: 17 min. (writer, director)
- 2013 – Vetrarmorgun ("Winter Morning"), language: Faroese, length: 19 min. (writer, director)

== Awards, scholarships etc. ==
- 2025 – Nordic Council Film Prize for The Last Paradise on Earth.
- 2021 – Received a three-year listafólkaløn (artist grant) from Mentanargrunnur Landsins.
- 2014 – Received LGBT Føroyar's media prize (Ársins miðlavirðisløn) for the short films Summarnátt and Vetrarmorgun. LGBT Føroyar cited the films for casting “a real and positive light on Faroese LGBT youth” and for telling stories that had previously been silenced in Faroese cultural life.
- 2014 – Received a film grant from the Faroese government of 45,000 DKK ($8,000) for the development of the screenplay for his first feature film.
- 2014 – Won the prize The Special Prize of the Generation 14plus International Jury at the Berlin International Film Festival 2014 for the short film Vetrarmorgun. The prize was 2500 Euro.
- 2013 – Received a half-year Working grant from Mentanargrunnur Landsins.
- 2012 – Won Geytin, a Faroese film prize DKK 25,000 ($4,000), he won for the short film Summarnátt (Summer Night)
- 2011 – Received the Faroese Cultural Prize, he received the special prize for a young artist DKK 50,000 ($9,000).
- 2010 – Won a prize at a film festival in Reykjavík for his short film Passasjeren. He won in the category Best short film by a new director. 140 films from 29 countries were shown at the film festival.
