= Brynhildur Þórarinsdóttir =

Icelandic children's writer (born 1970)

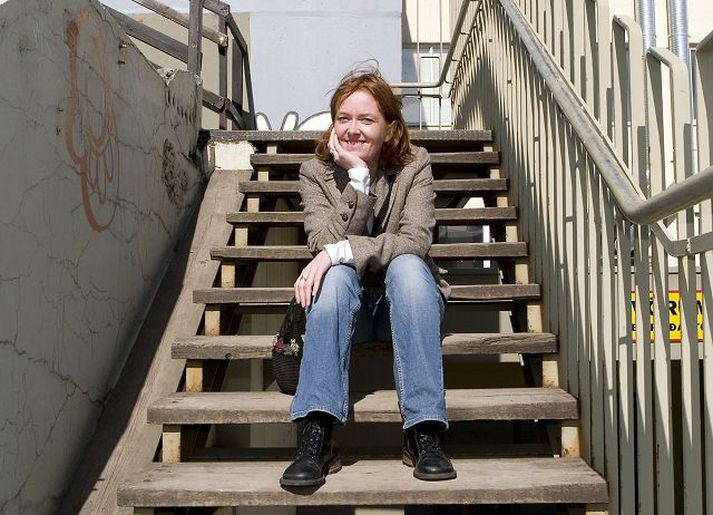
Brynhildur Þórarinsdóttir in 2007

Brynhildur Þórarinsdóttir (born 1970) is an Icelandic children's writer. She was born in Reykjavík. Among her children's books are Njala from 2002, Egla from 2004, and Laxdæla from 2006. She was awarded the Icelandic Children's Book Prize in 2004 for her Leyndardómur ljónsins and the Nordic Children's Book Prize in 2007. She lectures at the University of Akureyri.

== Awards ==
- 2004: Icelandic Children's Book Prize
- 2007: Nordic Children's Book Prize, for renarration of three Sagas of Icelanders, the Njáls saga, Egil's Saga and Laxdæla saga.

== See also ==
- List of Icelandic writers
- Icelandic literature
