= Super16 (film school) =

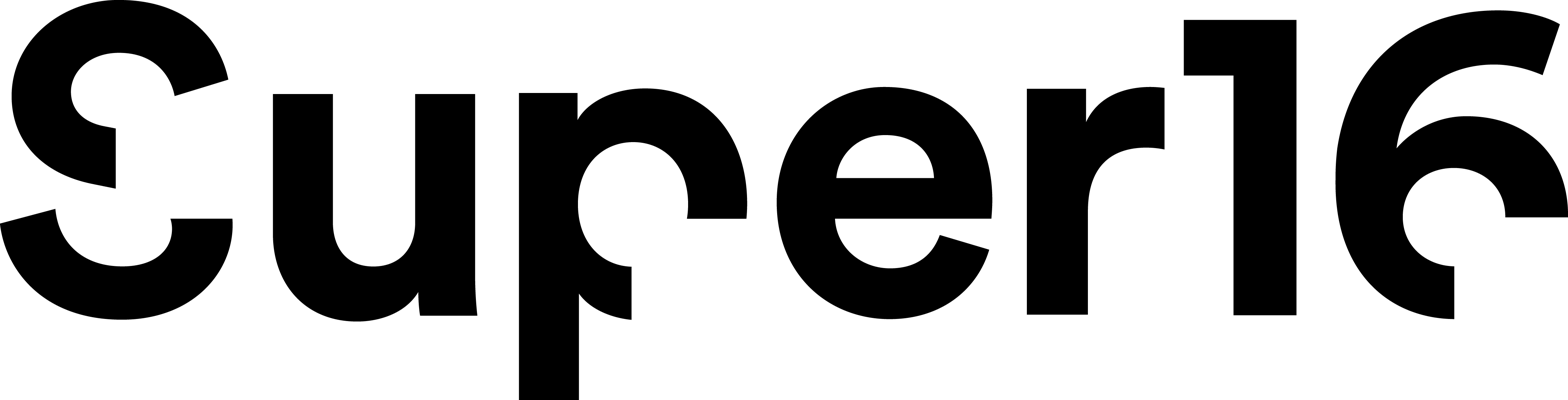

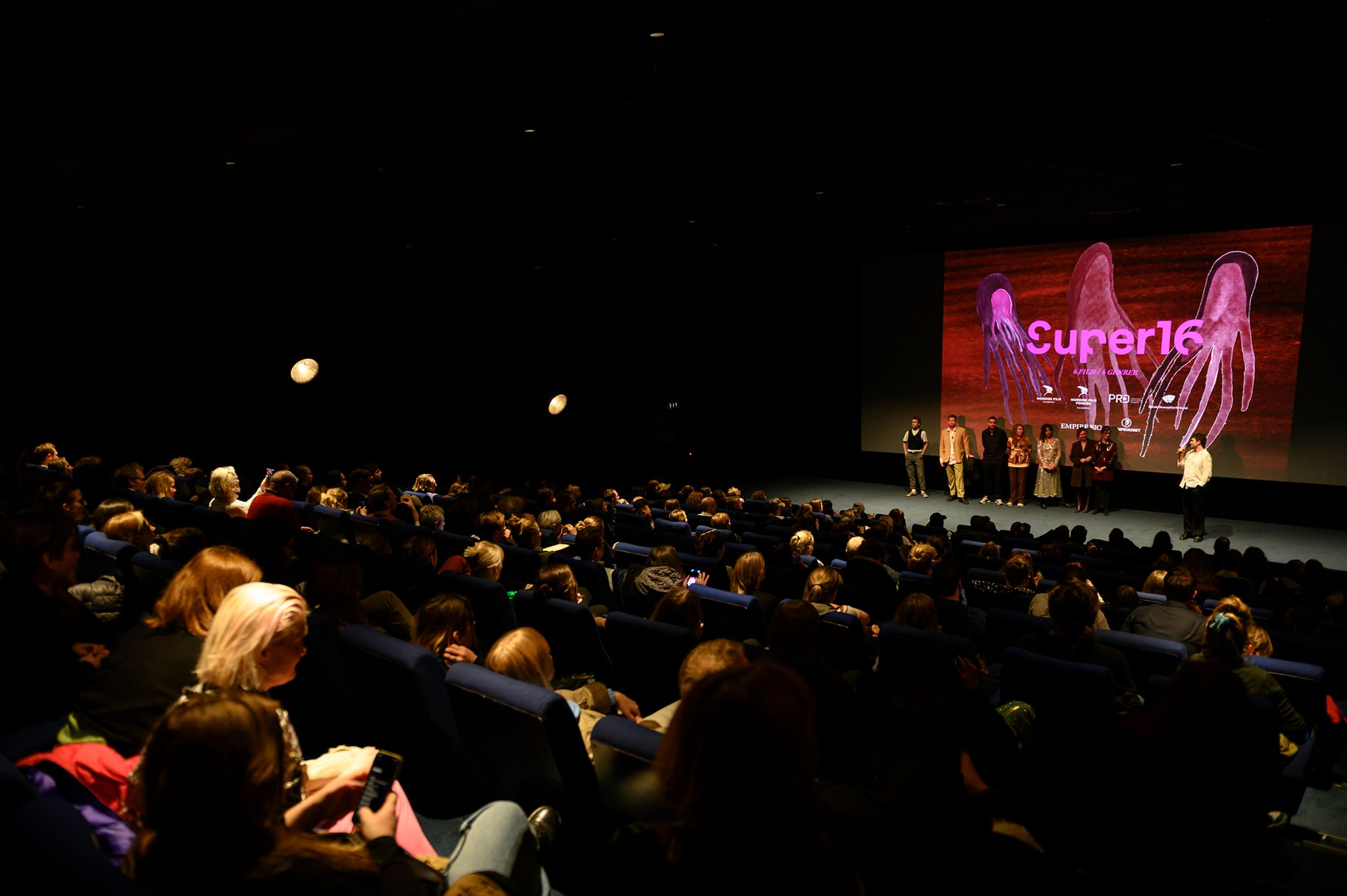
- Nordisk Film, Valby, Copenhagen; Denmark

Information
- Type: Film school
- Opened: 1999
- Founders: Carsten Myllerup; Linda Krogsøe Holmberg; Jens Mikkelsen
- School district: Independent
- Enrollment: 18
- Classes offered: Directing Screenwriting Producing
- Language: Danish
- Website: https://super16.dk/

Super16 is a Danish non-traditional film school based at the Nordisk Film Studio in Valby, Copenhagen. The name of the school refers to both the economical Super 16 mm film gauge, and to the number of participants in each class: 6 directors, 6 producers and 4 screenwriters (expanded to 6 in 2021). Each class program is for a 3-year period and produces 6 films annually. Although English-speaking applicants can apply, all instruction and communication is held in Danish.

The school was founded in 1999 as an alternative to the National Film School of Denmark. During its first twelve years, Super16 focused only on direction and production, but began including screenwriters in its 7th class in 2011. The school receives no public funding, but relies on support from the Danish film industry, including Nordisk Film and the Danish Film Institute.

The three founders of the school, Carsten Myllerup, Linda Krogsøe Holmberg, and Jens Mikkelsen, received in 2010 a Bodil Honorary Award for their work.

In 2015 Variety named Super16 as one of top 40 filmschools in the world.

In 2021 the screenwriting class at Super16 was expanded from 4 to 6 students which equaled it with the producing and directing class.

== Notable alumni ==
- Fenar Ahmad
- Carlos Augusto de Oliveira
- Daniel Borgman
- Caroline Sascha Cogez
- Martin Zandvliet
- Christian Dyekjær
- Heiðrik á Heygum
- Allan Hyde
- Morten Hartz Kaplers
- Jacob Oliver Krarup
- Sonny Lahey
- Charlotte Madsen
- Mads Matthiesen
- Kaspar Munk
- Jonas Poher Rasmussen
- Thomas Yong

== See also ==
- European Cross Media Academy
