= Katrin Ottarsdóttir =

Faroese movie director and author

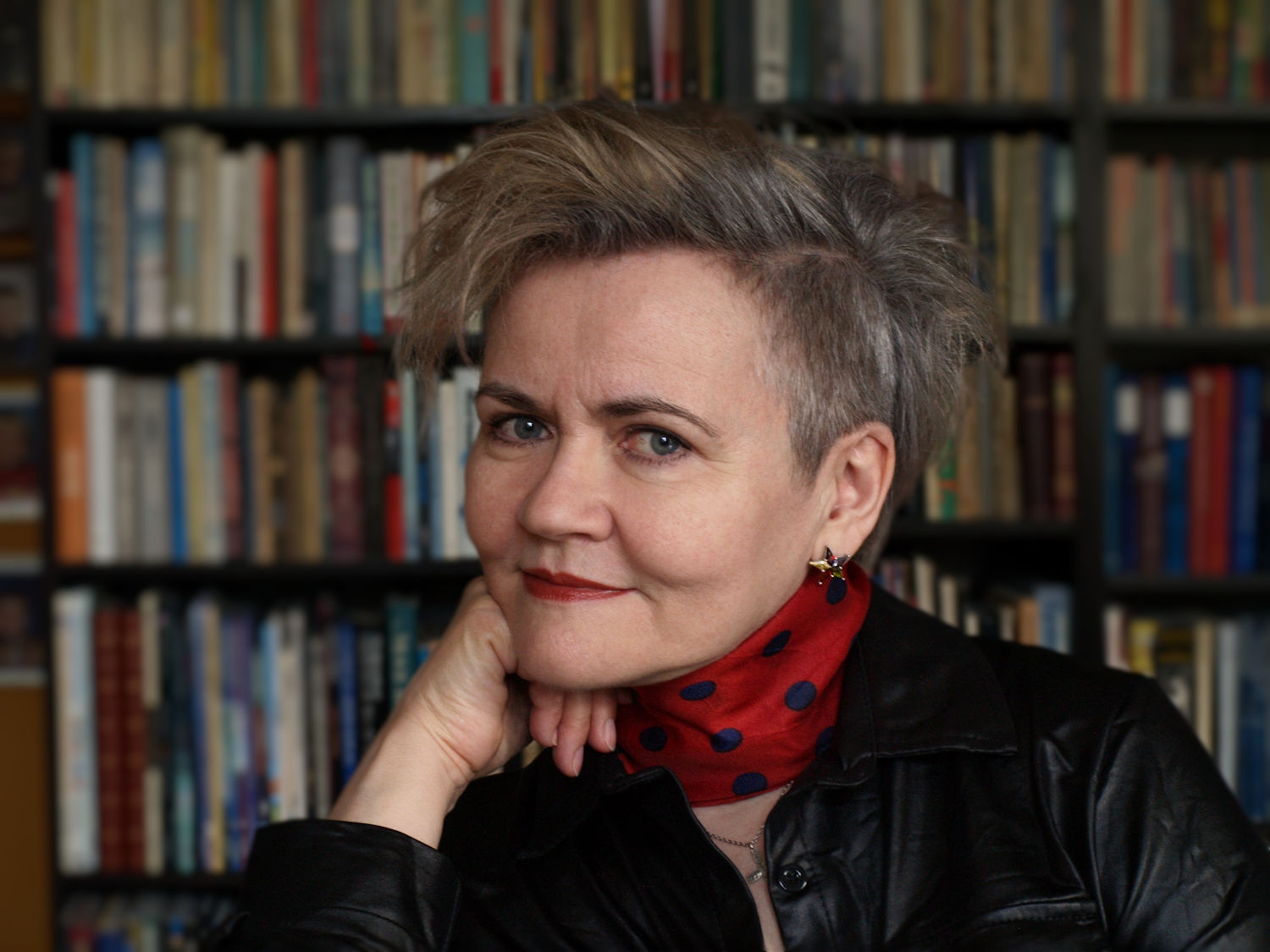
Katrin Ottarsdóttir

Katrin Ottarsdóttir (born 1957) is a Faroese movie director and author.

== Biography ==
Katrin Ottarsdóttir was born in Tórshavn. While growing up in the Faroes, she did not have television available to her, but enjoyed cinema. She went to Denmark in 1976 and is the first person from the Faroe Islands to study at the film school in Copenhagen, graduating in 1982. In 1989, she received the first prize for a Faroese film at the Nordische Filmtage film festival, for Atlantic Rhapsody.

Ottarsdóttir writes her own screenplays and also directs the films. She was both director and producer for Atlantic Rhapsody. Most of the actors in Ottarsdóttir's films are Faroese because the country has a rich theater scene, with many skilled actors available. The Faroe Islands, with their unique landscape, feature prominently in her films.

The road movie Bye Bye Bluebird received top honors in 1999 at Nordische Filmtage and the Tiger Award in 2000 at the International Film Festival Rotterdam. Her daughter Hildigunn Eyðfinnsdóttir (born 1975) took the leading role.

From 2007 to 2009 Katrin Ottarsdóttir was working on a trilogy of film portraits of Faroese artists. The first of the films, No One Can Achieve Perfection, about the sculptor Hans Pauli Olsen, premiered in January 2008. The second film – A Line A Day Must Be Enough! – about the poet, painter and performance artist Tóroddur Poulsen – premiered in September 2008. The third film in the trilogy, about the writer Jóanes Nielsen, was premiered at the end of 2009.

All three portrait films are "one-(wo)man, one camera" productions – directed, shot and edited by the filmmaker herself.

In 2011 she published some poems in the Faroese literature magazine Vencil; and in 2012 she published her first collection of poems, written in Faroese, with the title: Eru koparrør í himmiríki? (Are there copper tubings in Heaven?). In 2015 she published her second book with poems, Messa fyri einum filmi. In 2016 she published her first collection of short stories, with the title Aftanáðrenn. It has been translated into Danish. In 2020 Ottarsdóttir published her first novel, Gentan í verðini (The Girl in the World). The story is about a lively and curious little girl who goes to visit her grandparents in a small town. The story is written from the girl's perspective.

== Films ==
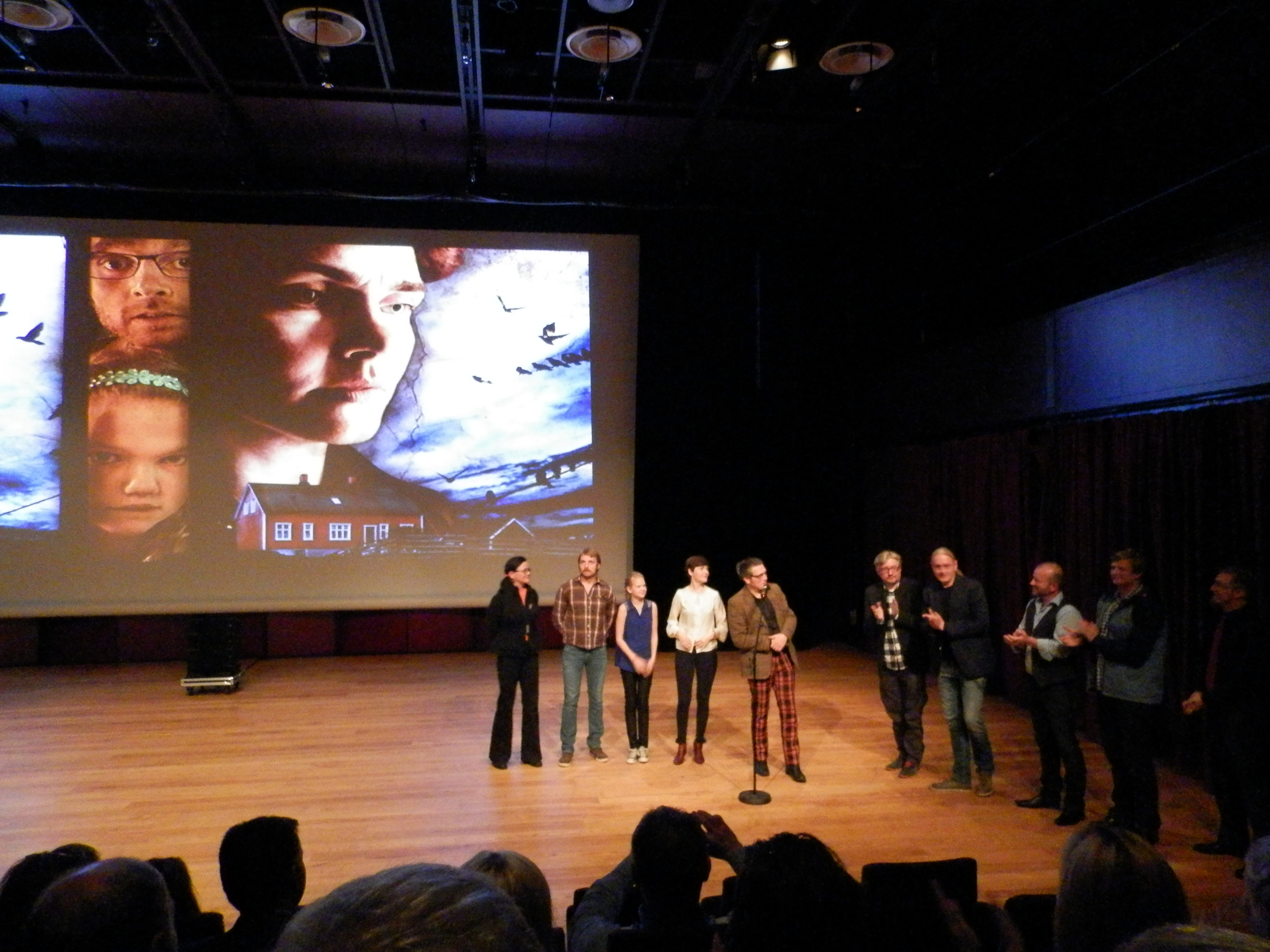
From the premiere of Ludo in Tórshavn, Faroe Islands on 11 September 2014.

- 2014 – Ludo. Feature film. 71 min.
- 2011 – Memories From an Apartment. Film installation. 5 × 6-8 min.
- 2011 – Budam: Last Song. Music video. 5 min.
- 2010 – Sporini vaksa úr orðum. A portrait of the Faroese writer Jóanes Nielsen
- 2008 – A Line A Day Must Be Enough!. Documentary. 58 min.
- 2008 – No One Can Achieve Perfection. Documentary. 85 min.
- 2003 – Regin smiður. Dance film. 5 min.
- 1999 – Bye Bye Bluebird. Feature film. 85 min.
- 1995 – The Man Who Was Allowed to Leave. Short film. 56 min.
- 1991 – Hannis. Children's short film. 30 min.
- 1989 – Atlantic Rhapsody. Feature film. 74 min.

== Bibliography ==
- 2020 – Gentan í verðini. Novel. Sprotin. 248 pages.
- 2018 – 43 bagatellir (in Faroese). Forlaget Torgard.
- 2018 – 43 bagateller (in Danish). Forlaget Torgard.
  - 2020 – 43 smámunir. Örsögur. Aðalsteinn Ásberg Sigurðsson translated to Icelandic. Dimma.
- 2016 – Aftanáðrenn. Short stories. Sprotin. 184 pages. ISBN 978-99972-1-214-6
  - 2017 – I Afrika er der mange søde børn. Translated into Danish by the author and Hugin Eide. Forlaget Torgard.
- 2015 – Messa fyri einum filmi. Poems. Mentunargrunnur Studentafelagsins.
- 2012 – Eru koparrør í himmiríki? (The title means: Are there any copper tubings in Heaven?) poems, 51 pages, Mentunargrunnur Studentafelagsins (publishing house), Tórshavn, 2012.
  - 2016 – Findes der kobberrør i himlen. Translated into Danish by the author. Torgard.
  - 2020 – Are there Copper Pipes in Heaven. Translated by Matthew Landrum. Operating System (publishing house), New York, NY.

== Honour ==
- 2018 – Received a three year grant (listafólkaløn) from Mentanargrunnur Landsins (the Faroese government).
- 2015 – Awarded a yearly lifelong grant of 20 000 DKK from the Faroese government. The award is called Sømdargáva landsins
- 2013 – Faroese Literature Prize for Eru koparrør í himmiríki (Are there any copper tubings in Heaven?), poems
- 2007 – Was awarded a 3-years grant (3-ára starvsløn) from the Mentanargrunnur Landsins (Foundation, established by the Faroese government)
- 2000 – Won the Tiger Award at the international filmfestival in Rotterdam. Katrin's daughter, Hildigunn Eyðfinnsdóttir (born 1975) plays the main role.
- 2000 – Won the Audience Award and Youth Jury Award at the French film festival Festival du film nordique in Rouen for Bye Bye Bluebird .
- 1999 – Won the 1. prize for the movie Bye Bye Bluebird at the German film festival Nordische Filmtage in Lübeck.
- 1989 – Won the 1. prize for the movie Atlantic Rhapsody at the German film festival Nordische Filmtage in Lübeck.
