= Nýtt Líf (magazine) =

Women's magazine in Iceland

- Categories: Women's magazine; Lifestyle magazine
- Frequency: Monthly
- Founded: 1978
- Country: Iceland
- Language: Icelandic

Nýtt Líf (Icelandic: New Life) is a glossy monthly women's magazine which has been in circulation since 1978 in Iceland. It is one of the earliest Icelandic periodicals featuring lifestyle-related topics.

== History and profile ==
Nýtt Líf was established in 1978. The magazine is published on a monthly basis. It covers topics related to women such as fashion and publishes interviews. The magazine also features news on sexual harassment against women, including a 2012 incident about Jón Baldvin Hannibalsson.

One of the former editors-in-chief of Nýtt Líf is Hjördís Rut Sigurjónsdóttir.

Nýtt Líf has awarded the Woman of the Year prize.
