= Ragnheiður Gestsdóttir =

Icelandic author (born 1953)

- Born: 1 May 1953 (age 73); Reykjavík, Iceland
- Occupation: Author
- Known for: Children's books

Ragnheiður Gestsdóttir (born 1 May 1953) is an Icelandic author, noted for her children's books.

== Biography ==
Ragnheiður Gestsdóttir was born on 1 May 1953 in Reykjavík.

Ragnheiður was born in a family of painters and writers. She graduated as a teacher from the Kennaraskóli Íslands in 1973, and took a degree in art history at Aarhus University in 1979. She also studied literature at the University of Iceland.

Ragnheiður worked as a teacher in Reykjavík for several years, and was editor of Iceland's National Centre for Educational Materials 1990–96. She has both illustrated and written books for children and teens.

Her first book, Ljósin lifna, was published in 1985. Ragnheiður has retold and illustrated various Icelandic folktales, pre-eminently in her book Sagan af Hlina konungssyni. Amongst other prizes, Ragnheiður won the Icelandic Children's Book Prize for her 2000 book Leikur á borði; and the Nordic Children's Book Prize in 2005 for her novel Sverðberinn. Her most recent novels include the 2009 Hjartsláttur and the 2012 Myndin í speglinum.

Ragnheiður lives in Hafnarfjörður. She is married and has four children.

== Prizes ==
- 2000 - Íslensku barnabókaverðlaunin: Leikur á borði
- 2001 - Barnabókaverðlaun Fræðsluráðs Reykjavíkur: 40 vikur
- 2004 - Barnabókaverðlaun Fræðsluráðs Reykjavíkur: Sverðberinn
- 2005 - Vorvindar IBBY
- 2005 - Nordic Children's Book Prize: Sverðberinn
