= Hjartsláttur =

2009 novel by Ragnheiður Gestsdóttir

Hjartsláttur ('heart-beat') is the fourth novel for young people by Ragnheiður Gestsdóttir. It was published in 2009 in Reykjavík by Mál og menning.

== Form ==
The novel is a third-person narrative. Each chapter is from the perspective of a particular character and takes its title from that character's name. Occasionally the same event is narrated twice from different characters' perspectives, illuminating the way in which the same event can be understood differently by different people.

The novel's characters explicitly draw inspiration from the story of Tristan and Isolde and the novel's plot bears some resemblance to this medieval romance.

== Plot ==
The main characters are around fifteen years old: Íris Sól and the new boy in her class, Tristan. Tristan is the son of Gerður and a Somali-Danish man later named as Karl; the fact that he is black is incidental to the plot but fairly often commented on in the text. At the beginning of the story, Tristan knows nothing about his paternity: as the story proceeds it emerges that his mother, Gerður, conceived him in a one-night stand with Karl in Denmark and never told Karl. The novel takes place against the backdrop of the 2008 Icelandic financial crisis, and particularly the 2009 Icelandic financial crisis protests.

Íris Sól and Tristan fall in love and begin a secret relationship. Tristan's mother finds that the mortgage on their new flat in Reykjavík is increasingly unaffordable due to the Crisis. She finds work teaching at university in Canada. Unwilling to move away from Íris Sól or to reveal his relationship, Tristan runs away from home in order to emphasise his commitment to staying in Iceland. Tristan's mother has previously noticed in the news that Tristan's father Karl has moved to Iceland to work as a handball coach and concludes that Tristan has seen Karl and recognised him as his father. She reveals Tristan's paternity to her own father, Bjarni, who visits Karl in an unsuccessful search for Tristan; in this way, Karl discovers that Tristan exists.

Tristan spends his first night away from home in Ikea; the second in an unfinished block of flats in Hafnarfjörður, where he enjoys the hospitality of some Eastern European migrant workers; and then walks to his grandparents' stable in Keflavík for his third night. Exhausted by the walk, he encounters two men making illicit use of the abandoned farm buildings by the stable. They threaten him, but Tristan is rescued by Íris Sól, who, concerned that Tristan might die of exposure, raises the alarm and proceeds to the farm with Tristan's mother and the police; Karl and Bjarni join them at the scene; and the criminals (who are implicitly growing marijuana) are apprehended.

The story ends with Tristan's relationship to Íris Sól and to Karl becoming public.

== Critical reception ==
The novel's denouement has been criticised as being rather unrealistic by Margrét Tryggvadóttir.
