= Halldóra =

Halldóra is an Icelandic given name which is the feminine form of Halldór.

== List of people with the given name ==
- Halldóra Briem (1913–1993), Icelandic architect
- Halldóra Eldjárn (1923–2008), first lady of Iceland
- Halldóra Eyjólfsdóttir (died 1210), Icelandic abbess
- Halldóra Geirharðsdóttir (born 1968), Icelandic actress and musician
- Halldóra Ísleifsdóttir (born 1970), Icelandic visual communication designer, artist, and design activist
- Halldóra Mogensen (born 1979), Icelandic politician
- Halldóra Sigvaldadóttir (died c. 1544), Icelandic abbess
- Halldóra K. Thoroddsen (1950–2020), Icelandic writer
- Halldóra Tumadóttir (1180–1247), Icelandic political figure
