= Halldorson =

Halldorson is a surname. Notable people with the surname include:

- Christian Halldorson (1891–1956), Canadian politician
- Dan Halldorson (born 1952), Canadian golfer
- Laura Halldorson (born 1963), American ice hockey player and coach
- Salome Halldorson (1887–1970), Canadian politician

== See also ==
- Halldórsson, Icelandic patronymic name
