= Halldórsdóttir =

Halldórsdóttir is an Icelandic surname, meaning daughter of Halldór. Notable people with the surname include:

- Elínborg Halldórsdóttir (born 1962), Icelandic musician and painter
- Guðný Halldórsdóttir (born 1954), Icelandic film director and screenwriter
- Hafrún Rakel Halldórsdóttir (born 2002), Icelandic footballer
- Kolbrún Halldórsdóttir (born 1955), Icelandic politician
- Kristín Halldórsdóttir (1939–2016), Icelandic politician and journalist
