= 2009 Icelandic financial crisis protests =

Icelandic protest movement

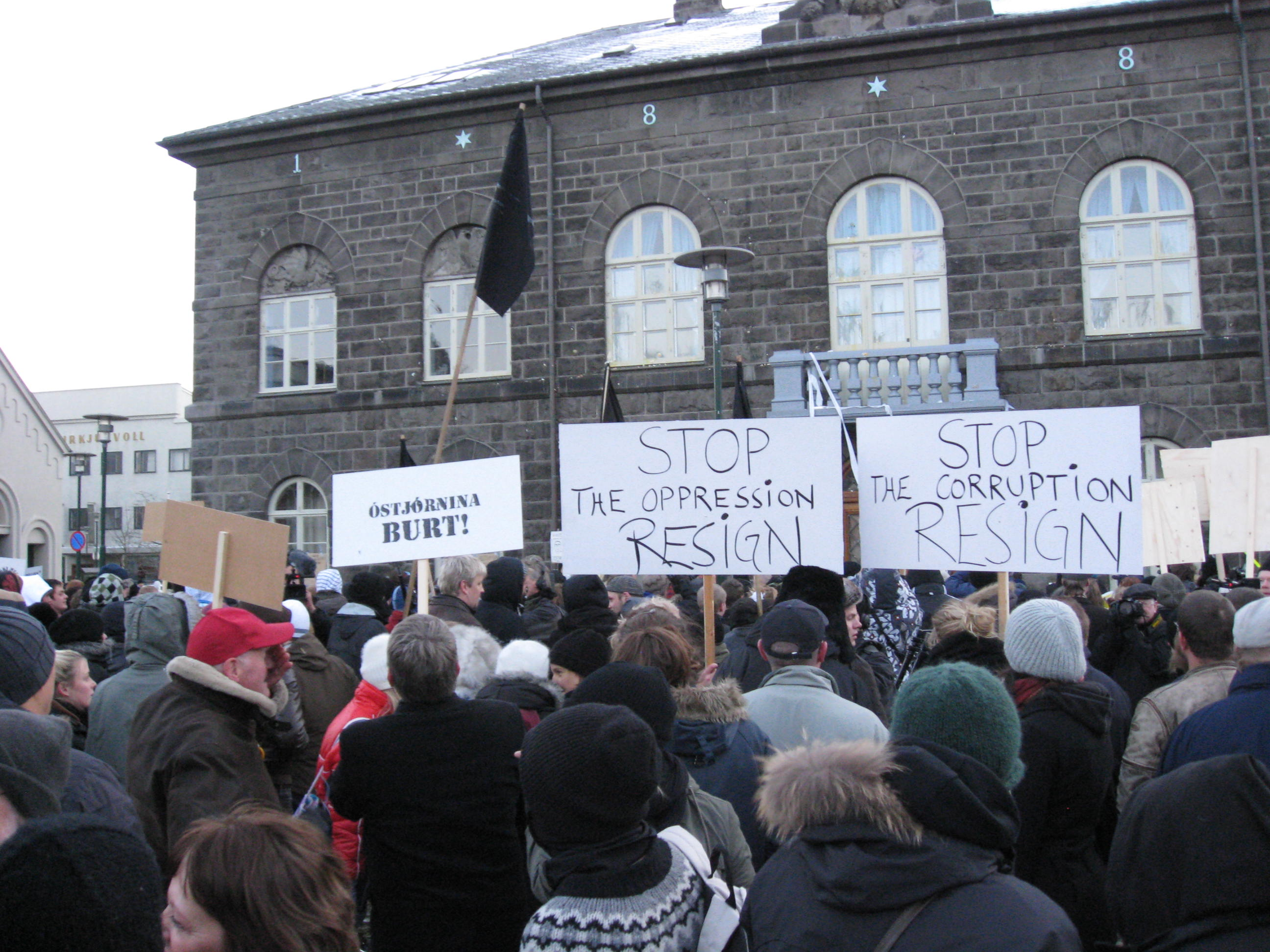
Some of the 6000 protesters in front of the Alþingishús, seat of the Icelandic parliament, on 15 November 2008

The Kitchenware, Kitchen Implement or Pots and Pans Revolution (Icelandic: Búsáhaldabyltingin) was a series of protests that erupted in Iceland in 2009 in response to the 2008–2011 Icelandic financial crisis. There had been regular and growing protests since October 2008 against the Government of Iceland's handling of the 2008 financial crisis. The protests intensified on 20 January 2009 with thousands of people protesting at the parliament (Althing) in Reykjavík. These were at the time the largest protests in Icelandic history.

Protesters were calling for the resignation of government officials and for new elections to be held. The protests stopped for the most part with the resignation of the old government led by the right-wing Independence Party. A new left-wing government was formed after elections in late April 2009. It was supportive of the protestors and initiated a reform process that included the judicial prosecution before the Landsdómur of former Prime Minister Geir Haarde.

Several referendums were held to ask the citizens about whether to pay the Icesave debt of their banks. From a complex and unique process, 25 common people, of no political party, were to be elected to form an Icelandic Constitutional Assembly that would write a new Constitution of Iceland. After some legal problems, a Constitutional Council, which included those people, presented a Constitution Draft to the Iceland Parliament on 29 July 2011.

== Chronology ==
=== 2008–2009: Protests and government change ===
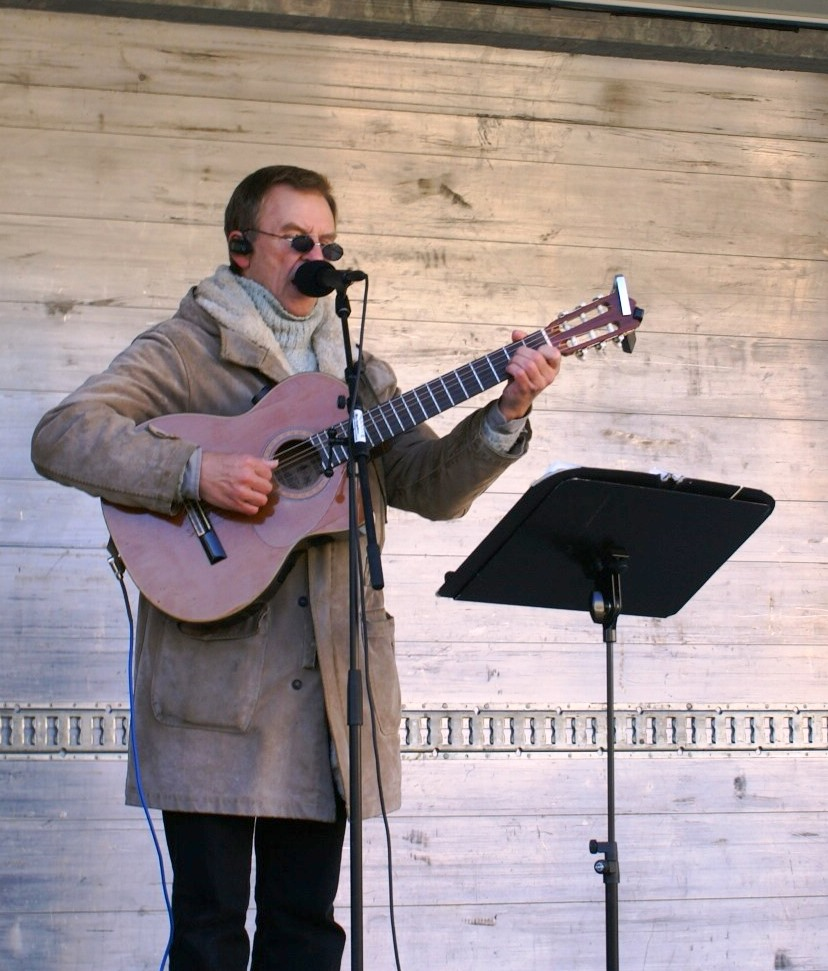
Hörður Torfason at the second weekly protest, on 18 October 2008

Concerned with the state of the Icelandic economy, Hörður Torfason staged a one-man protest in October 2008. Hörður stood "out on Austurvöllur with an open microphone and invited people to speak". The following Saturday a more organised demonstration occurred, and participants established the Raddir fólksins. The group decided to stage a rally every Saturday until the government stepped down. Hörður led the protest from a stage near the front. Speakers, voices of the people (Icelandic: Raddir fólksins) were: Andri Snær Magnason, author; Arndís Björnsdóttir, teacher; Björn Þorsteinsson, philosopher; Dagný Dimmblá, student; Einar Már Guðmundsson, writer; Gerður Kristný, writer; Gerður Pálmadóttir, business woman; Guðmundur Gunnarsson, president of Writers' Union of Iceland (RSÍ); Halldóra Guðrún Ísleifsdóttir, teacher, artist, and graphic designer; Hörður Torfason, musician and trubator; Illugi Jökulsson, author; Jón Hreiðar Erlendsson; Katrín Oddsdóttir, lawyer; Kristín Helga Gunnarsdóttir, author; Kristín Tómasdóttir, health consultant; Lárus Páll Birgisson, orderly; Lilja Mósesdóttir, economist; Pétur Tyrfingsson, psychologist; Ragnheiður Gestsdóttir, author; Ragnhildur Sigurðardóttir, historian; Sigurbjörg Árnadóttir, journalist; Sindri Viðarsson, historian; Stefán Jónsson, teacher and theatre director; Viðar Þorsteinsson, philosopher; Þorvaldur Gylfason, economist; Þráinn Bertelsson, author. Formal address by Ernesto Ordiss, and Óskar Ástþórsson, kindergarten teacher. Impromptu speakers were Birgir Þórarinsson, Sturla Jónsson, and Kolfinna Baldvinsdóttir.

The protests were a feature of the traditional New Year's Eve comedy revue, Áramótaskaupið, in 2008. The sketches included one of Jón Gnarr playing a strait-laced middle-aged protester struggling to express his indignation at the crisis and eventually coming up with a sign reading Helvítis fokking fokk!! This phrase soon came to be used in real-life placards and wider discourses surrounding the protests.

On 20 January 2009, the protests intensified into riots. Between 1,000 and 2,000 people clashed with riot police, who used pepper spray and batons, around the building of the parliament (Althing), with at least 20 people being arrested and 20 more needing medical attention for exposure to pepper spray. Demonstrators banged pots and honked horns to disrupt the year's first meeting of Prime Minister Geir Haarde and the Althing. Some broke windows of the parliament house, threw skyr and snowballs at the building, and threw smoke bombs into its backyard. The use of pots and pans saw the local press refer to the event as the "Kitchenware Revolution".

On 21 January 2009, the protests continued in Reykjavík, where the Prime Minister's car was pelted with snowballs, eggs and cans by demonstrators demanding his resignation. Government buildings were surrounded by a crowd of at least 3,000 people, pelting them with paint and eggs, and the crowd then moved towards the Althing where one demonstrator climbed the walls and put up a sign that read "Treason due to recklessness is still treason." No arrests were reported.

On 22 January 2009, police used tear gas to disperse people on Austurvöllur (the square in front of the Althing), the first such use since the 1949 anti-NATO protest. Around 2,000 protesters had surrounded the building since the day before and they hurled fireworks, shoes, toilet paper, rocks, and paving stones at the building and its police guard. Reykjavík police chief Stefán Eiríksson said that they tried to disperse a "hard core" of a "few hundred" with pepper spray before using the tear gas. Stefán also commented that the protests were expected to continue, and that this represented a new situation for Iceland.

Despite the announcement on 23 January 2009 of early Parliamentary elections (to be held on 25 April 2009) and the announcement of Prime Minister Geir Haarde that he was withdrawing from politics due to esophageal cancer and would not be a candidate in those elections, protesters continued to fill the streets, calling for a new political scene and for immediate elections; Haarde (Independence Party) announced on 26 January 2009 that he would hand in his resignation as PM shortly, after talks with the Social Democratic Alliance on keeping the government intact had failed earlier the same day.

The Social Democratic Alliance formed a new government on a minority coalition with the Left-Green Movement, with the support of the Progressive Party and the Liberal Party, which was sworn in on 1 February. Former Social Affairs Minister Jóhanna Sigurðardóttir became prime minister. The three parties also agree to convene a constitutional assembly to discuss changes to the Constitution. There was no agreement on the question of an early referendum on prospective EU and euro membership.

The parliamentary election was held in Iceland on 25 April 2009 following strong pressure from the public due to the 2008–2011 Icelandic financial crisis. The Social Democratic Alliance and the Left-Green Movement, which formed the outgoing coalition government under Prime Minister Jóhanna Sigurðardóttir, both made gains and an overall majority of seats in the Althing (Iceland's parliament). The Progressive Party also made gains, and the new Citizens' Movement, formed after the January 2009 protests, gained four seats. The big loser was the Independence Party, which had been in power for 18 years until January 2009: it lost a third of its support and nine seats in the Althing.

=== 2009–2010: Citizen forums and constitutional changing ===
Taking its cue from nationwide protests and lobbying efforts by civil organisations, the new governing parties decided that Iceland's citizens should be involved in creating a new constitution and started to debate a bill on 4 November 2009 about that purpose. Parallel to the protests and parliament deliverance, citizens started to unite in grassroots-based think-tanks. A National Forum was organised on 14 November 2009 (Icelandic: Þjóðfundur 2009), in the form of an assembly of Icelandic citizens at the Laugardalshöll in Reykjavík, by a group of grassroots citizen movements such as Anthill. The Forum would settle the ground for the 2011 Constitutional Assembly and was streamed via the Internet to the public.

Fifteen hundred people were invited to participate in the assembly; of these, 1,200 were chosen at random from the national registry, while 300 were representatives of companies, institutions and other groups. Participants represented a cross section of Icelandic society, ranging in age from 18 to 88 and spanning all six constituencies of Iceland, with 73, 77, 89, 365 and 621 people attending from the Northwest, Northeast, South, Southwest and Reykjavík (combined), respectively; 47% of the attendants were women, while 53% were men.

On 16 June 2010 the Constitutional Act was accepted by parliament and a new Forum was summoned. The Constitutional Act prescribed that the participants of the Forum had to be randomly sampled from the National Population Register, "with due regard to a reasonable distribution of participants across the country and an equal division between genders, to the extent possible". The National Forum 2010 was initiated by the government on 6 November 2010 and had 950 random participants, organized in subcommisions, which would present a 700-page document that would be the basis for constitutional changes, which would debate a future Constitutional Assembly. The Forum 2010 came into being due to the efforts of both governing parties and the Anthill group. A seven-headed Constitutional Committee, appointed by the parliament, was charged with the supervision of the forum and the presentation of its results, while the organization and facilitation of the National Forum 2010 was done by the Anthill group that had organized the first Forum 2009.

=== 2010–2011: Constitutional Assembly and Council ===
The process continued in the election of 25 people of no political affiliation on 27 November 2010. The Supreme Court of Iceland later invalidated the results of the election on 25 January 2011 following complaints about several faults in how the election was conducted, but the Parliament decided that it was the way, and not the elects, that had been questioned, and also that those 25 elects would be a part of a Constitutional Council and thus the Constitutional change went on. On 29 July 2011 the draft was presented to the Parliament.

=== 2012: Referendum on the new constitution ===
After the draft of the Constitution was presented on 29 July 2011, the Alþingi, the Icelandic parliament, finally agreed in a vote on 24 May 2012, with 35 in favor and 15 against, to organize an advisory referendum on the Constitutional Council's proposal for a new constitution no later than 20 October 2012. The only opposing parliament members were the former governing right party, the Independence Party. Also a proposed referendum on discontinuing the accession talks with the European Union by some parliamentaries of the governing left coalition was rejected, with 34 votes against and 25 in favour.

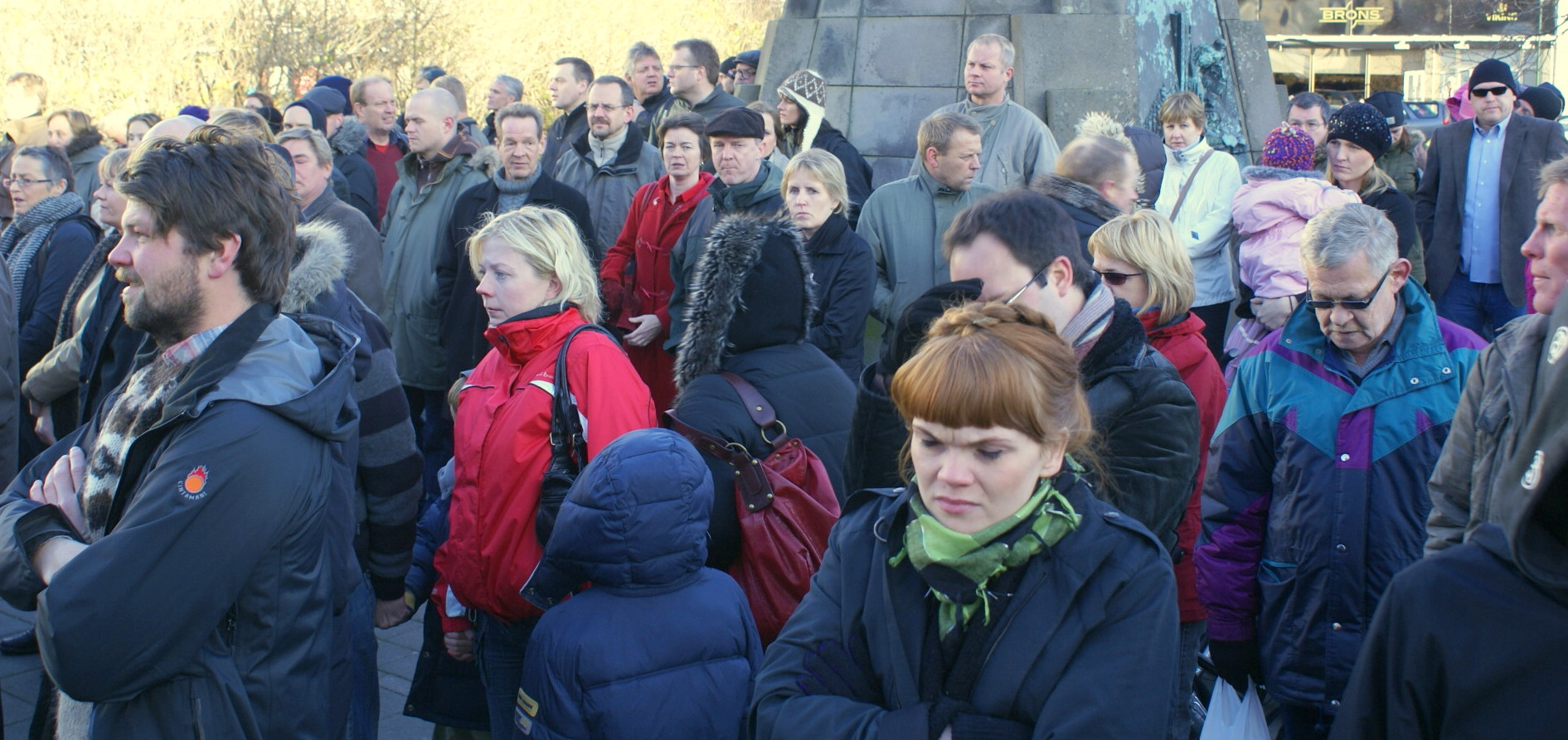
18 October 2008

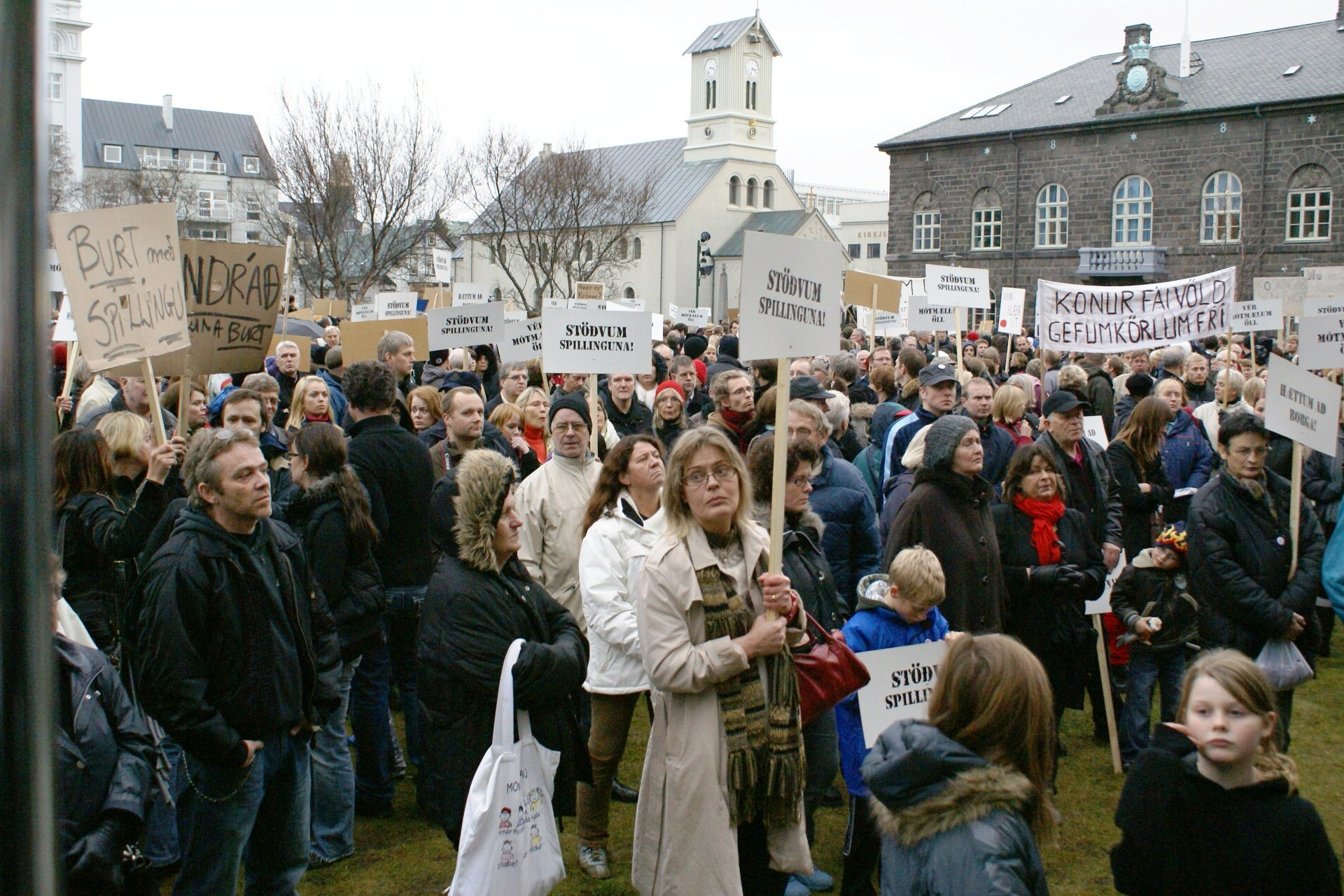
8 November 2008

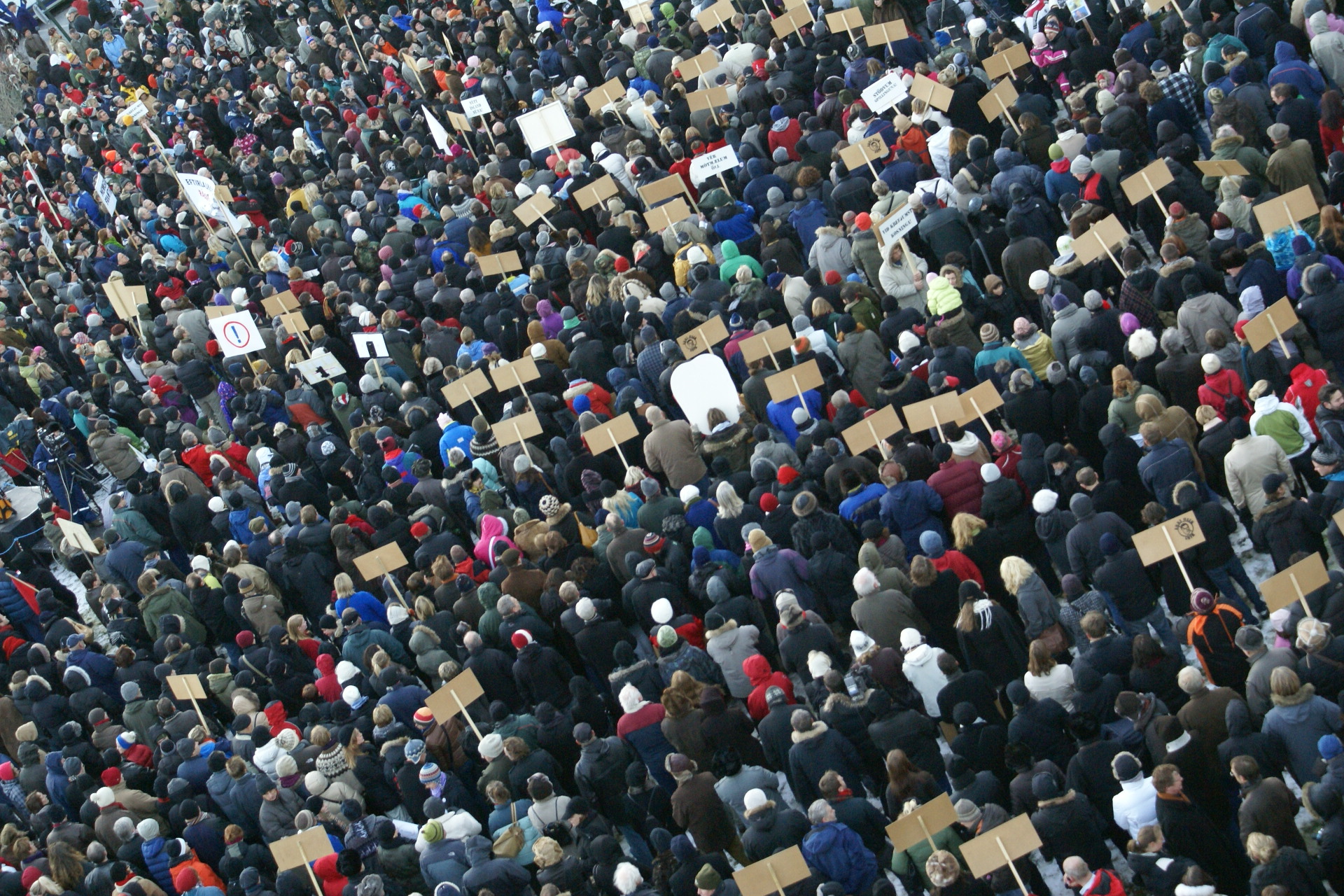
15 November 2008

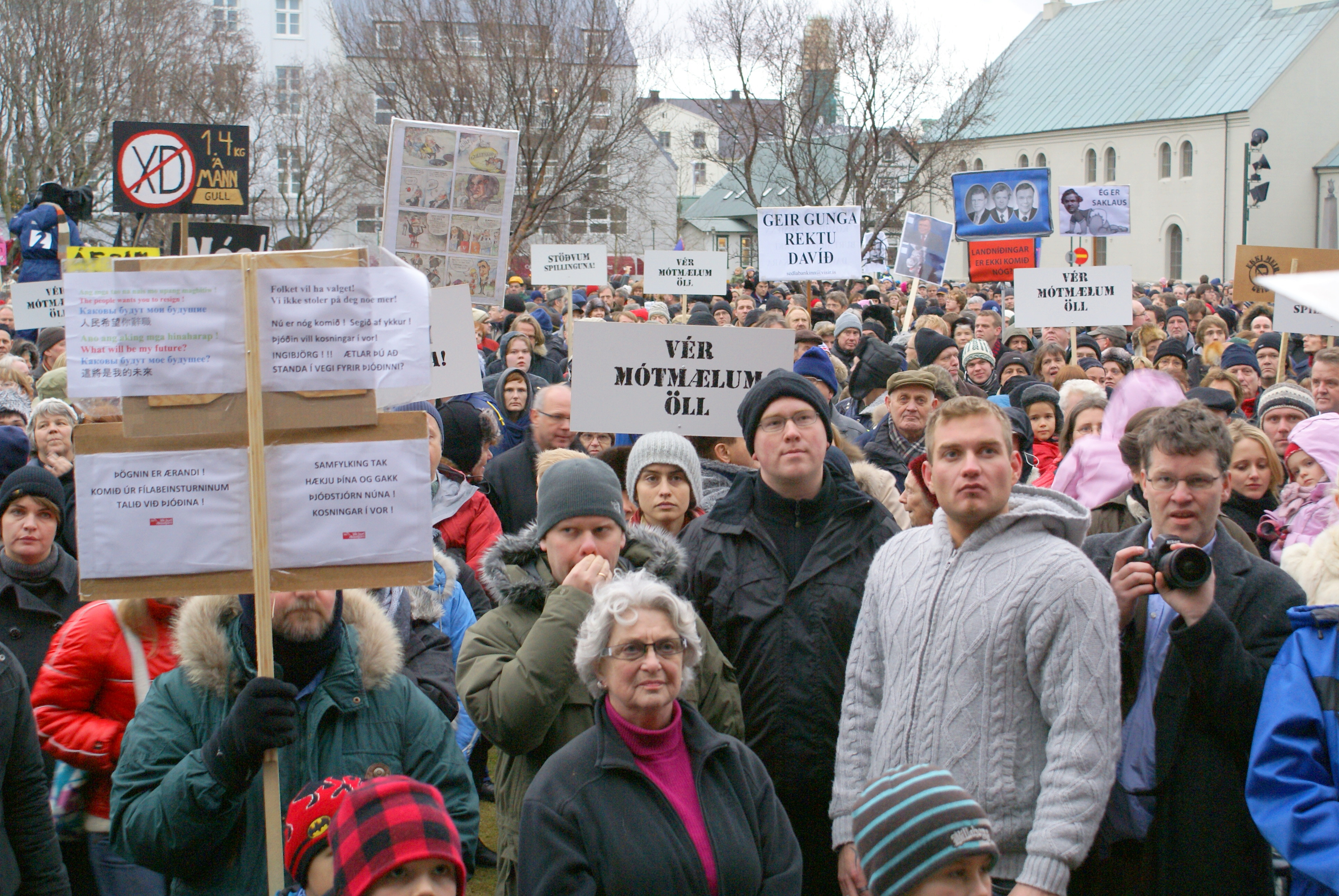
22 November 2008

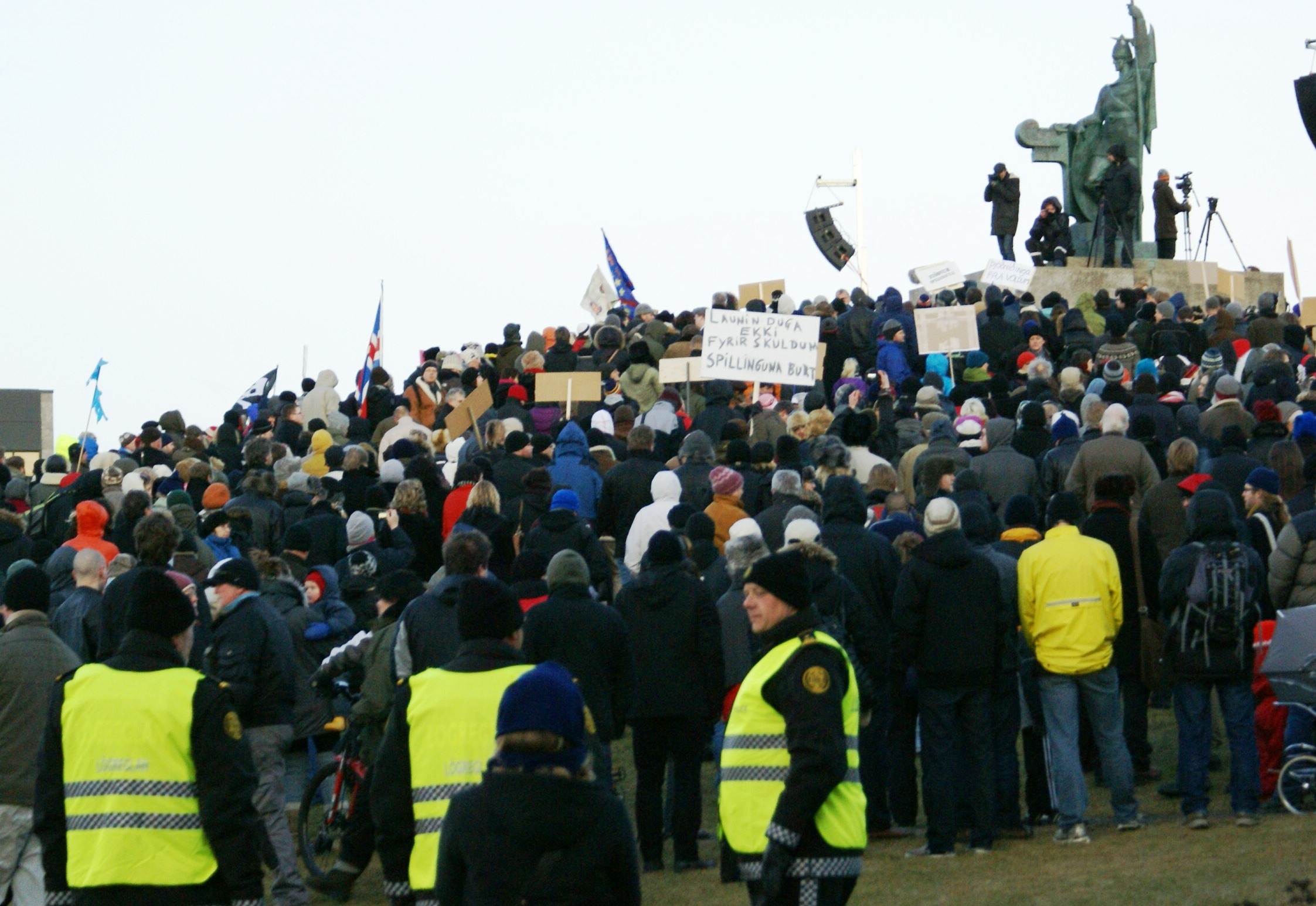
1 December 2008

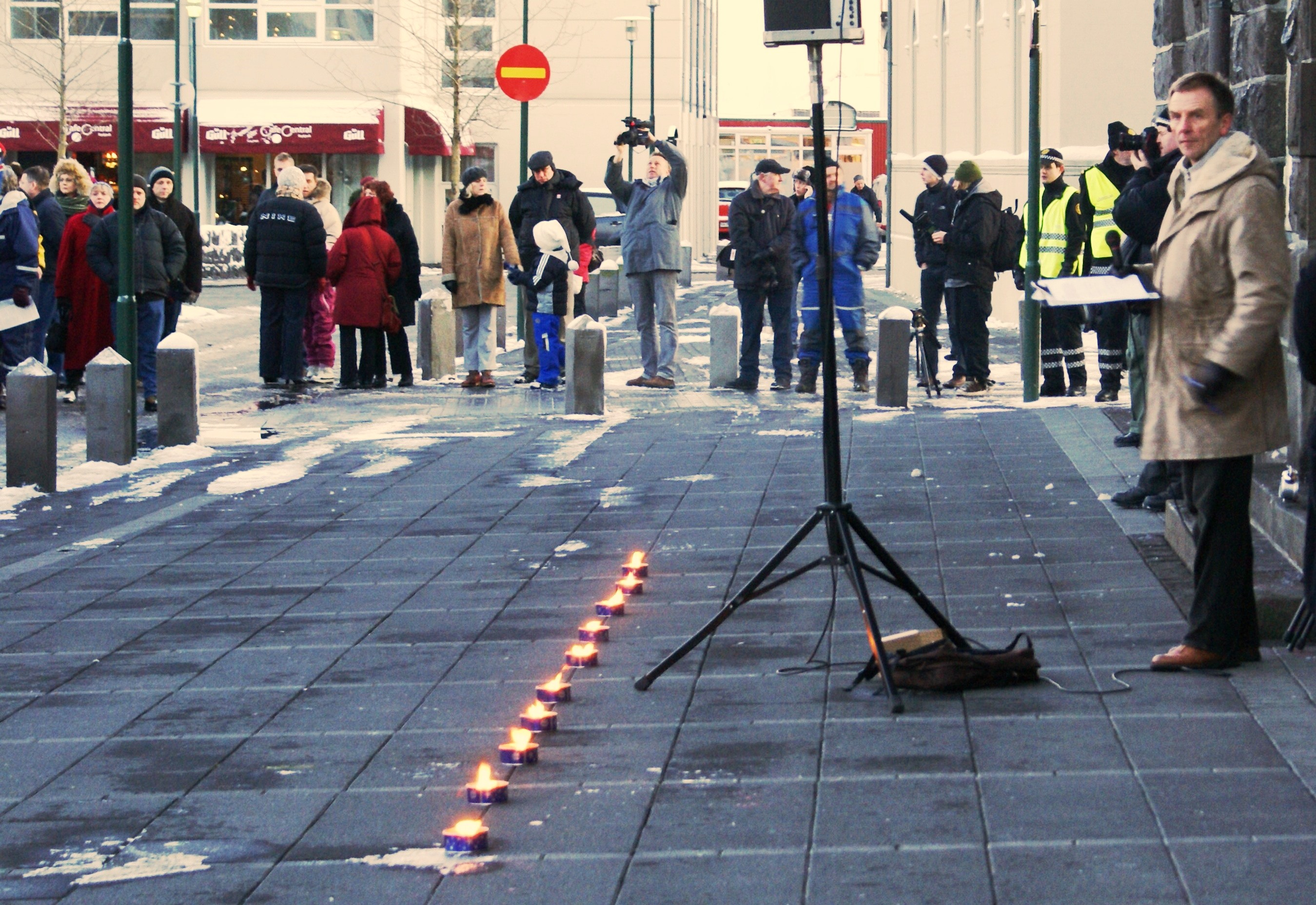
13 December 2008

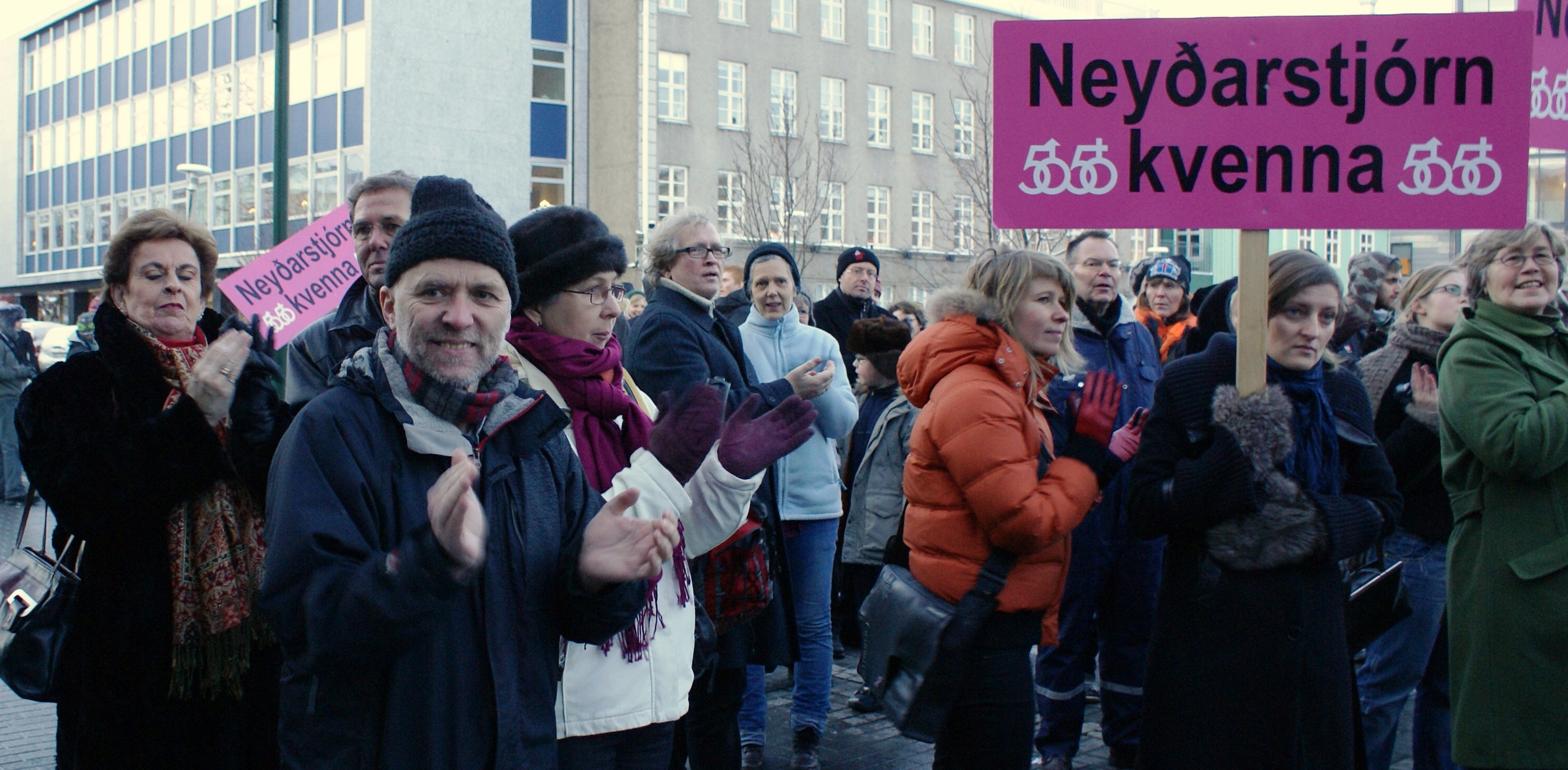
20 December 2008

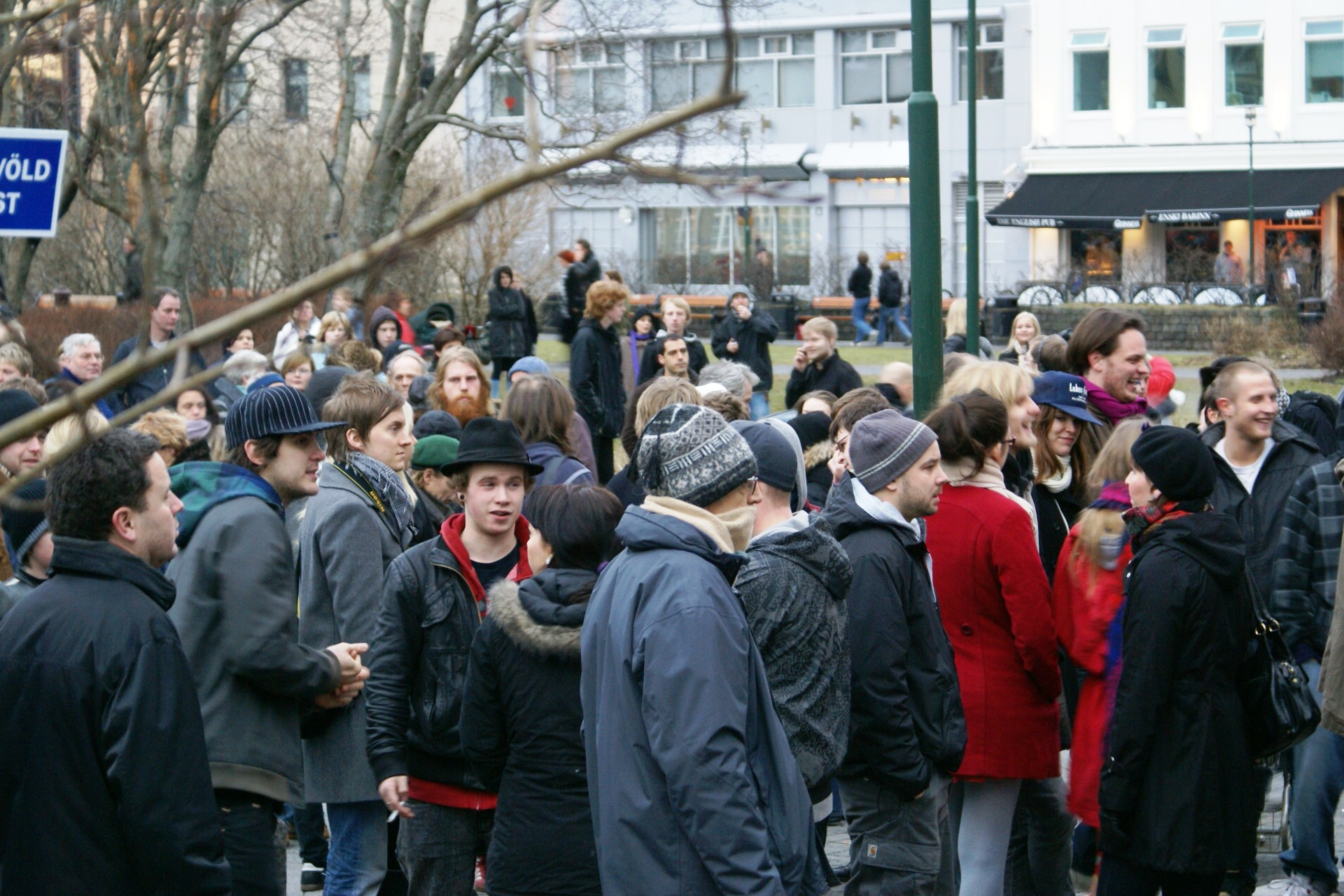
31 December 2008

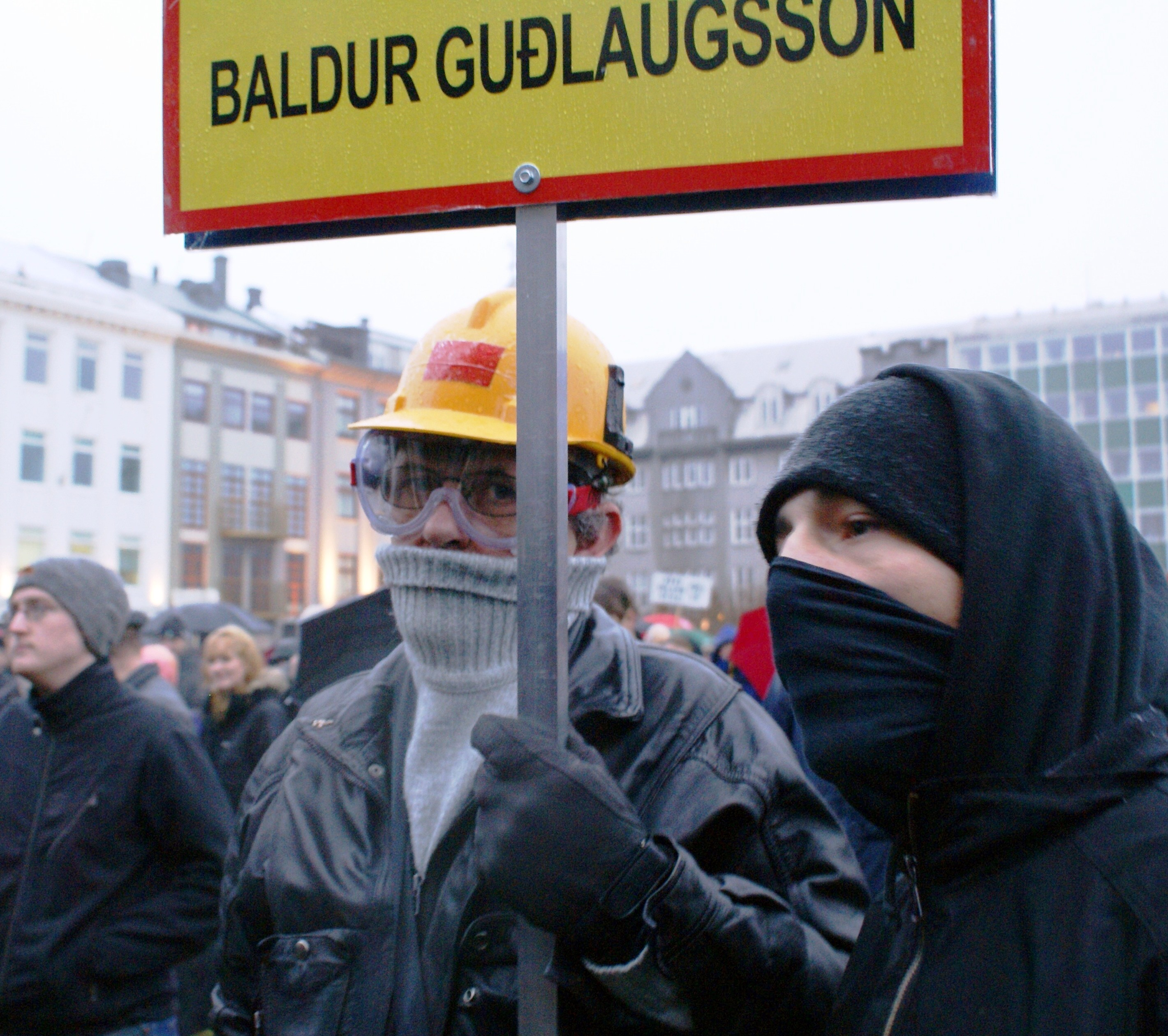
3 January 2009

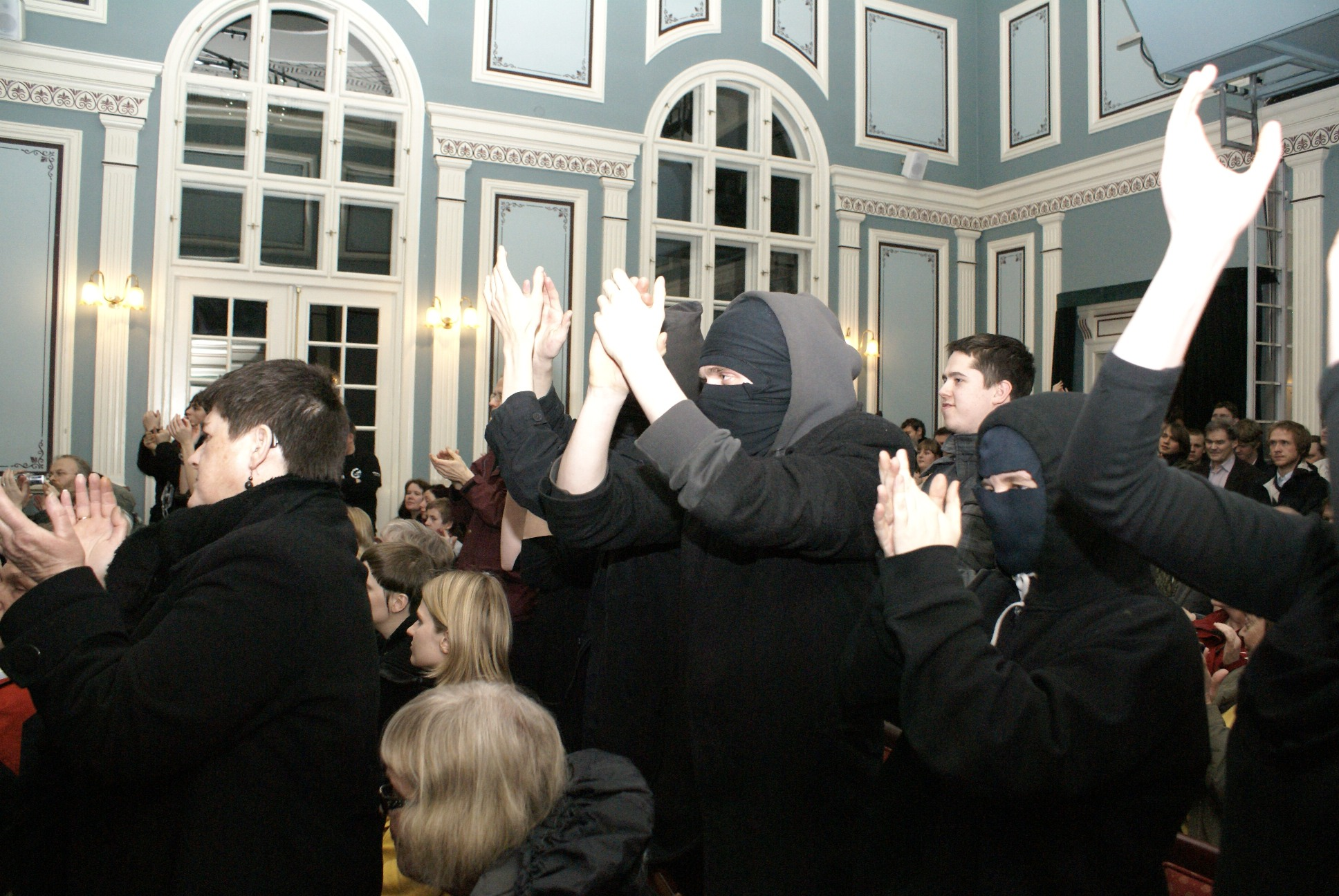
8 January 2009

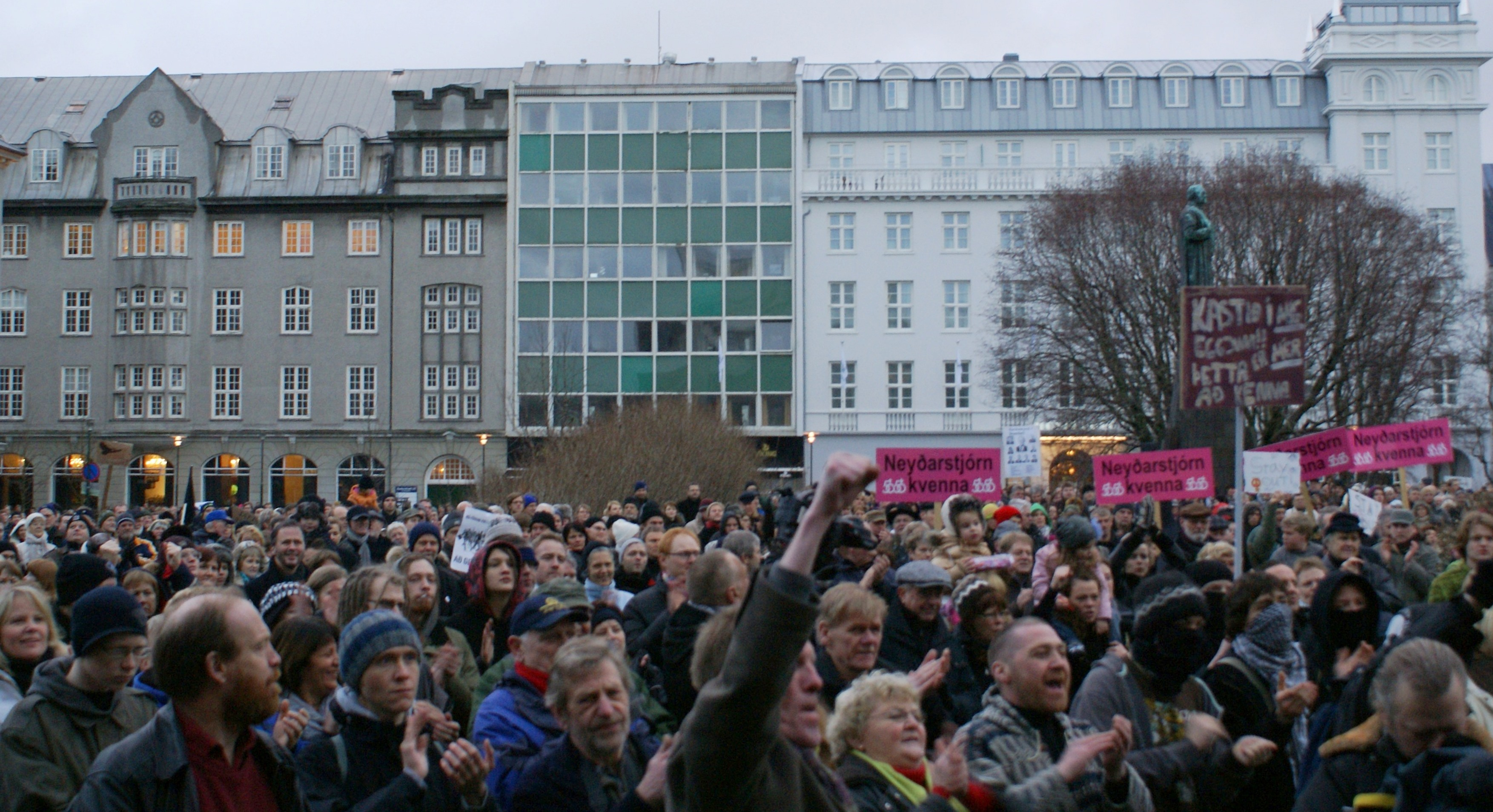
10 January 2009

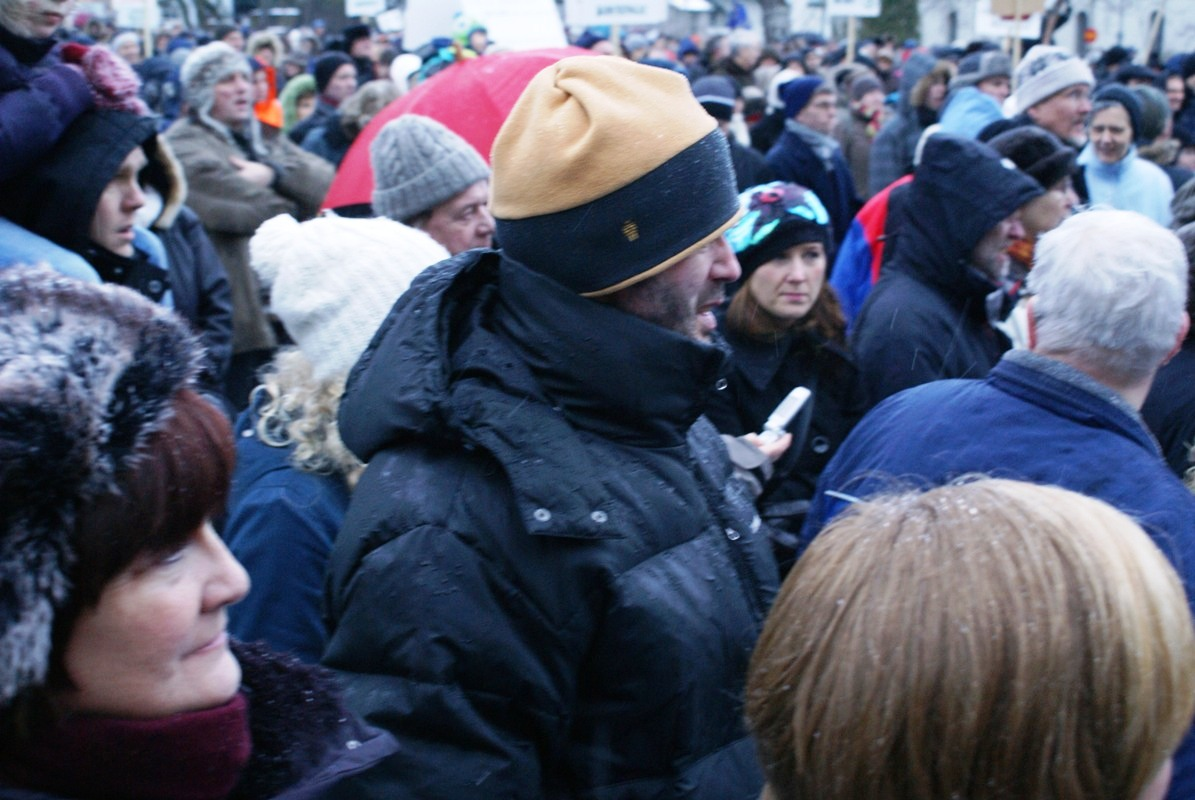
17 January 2009

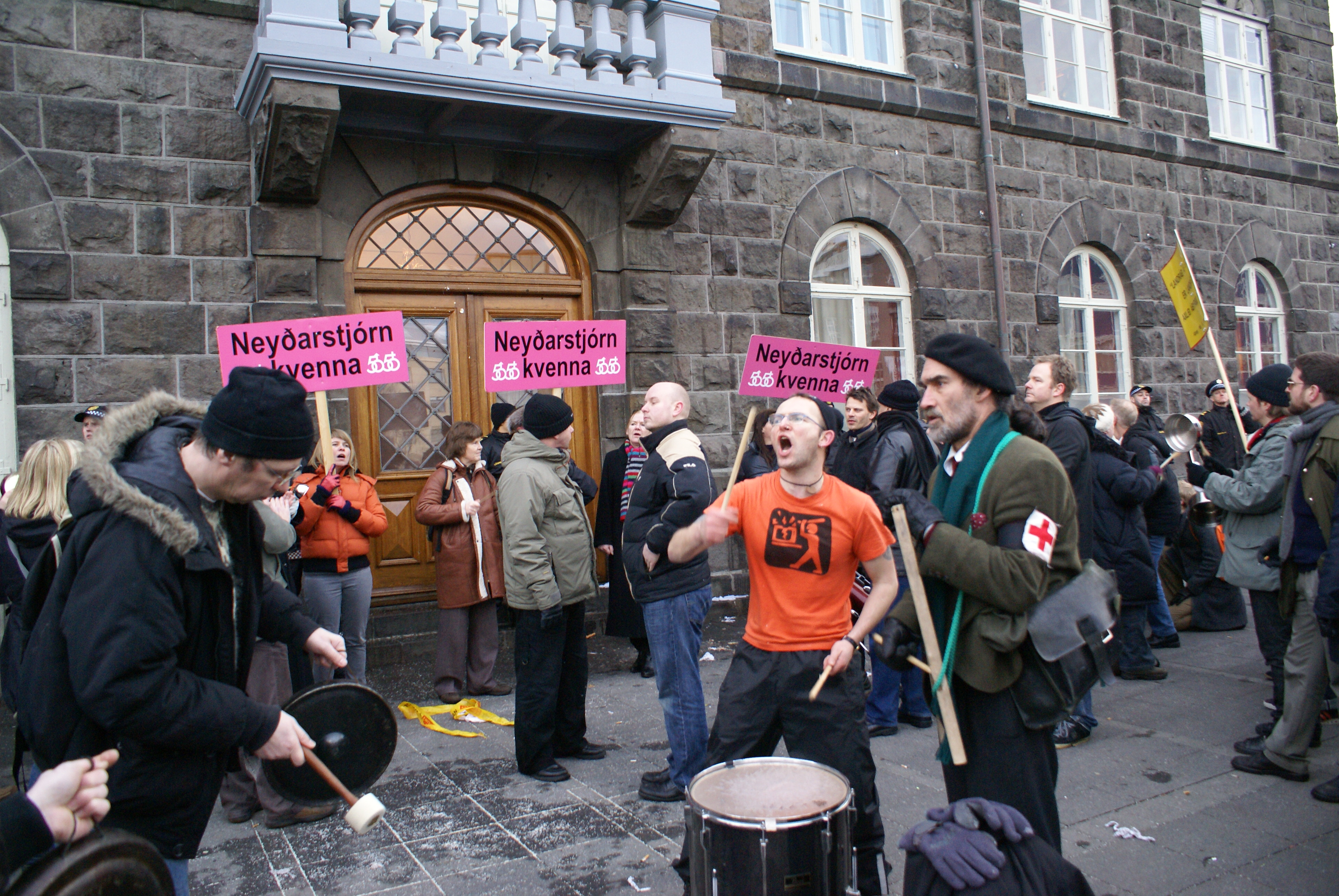
20 January 2009

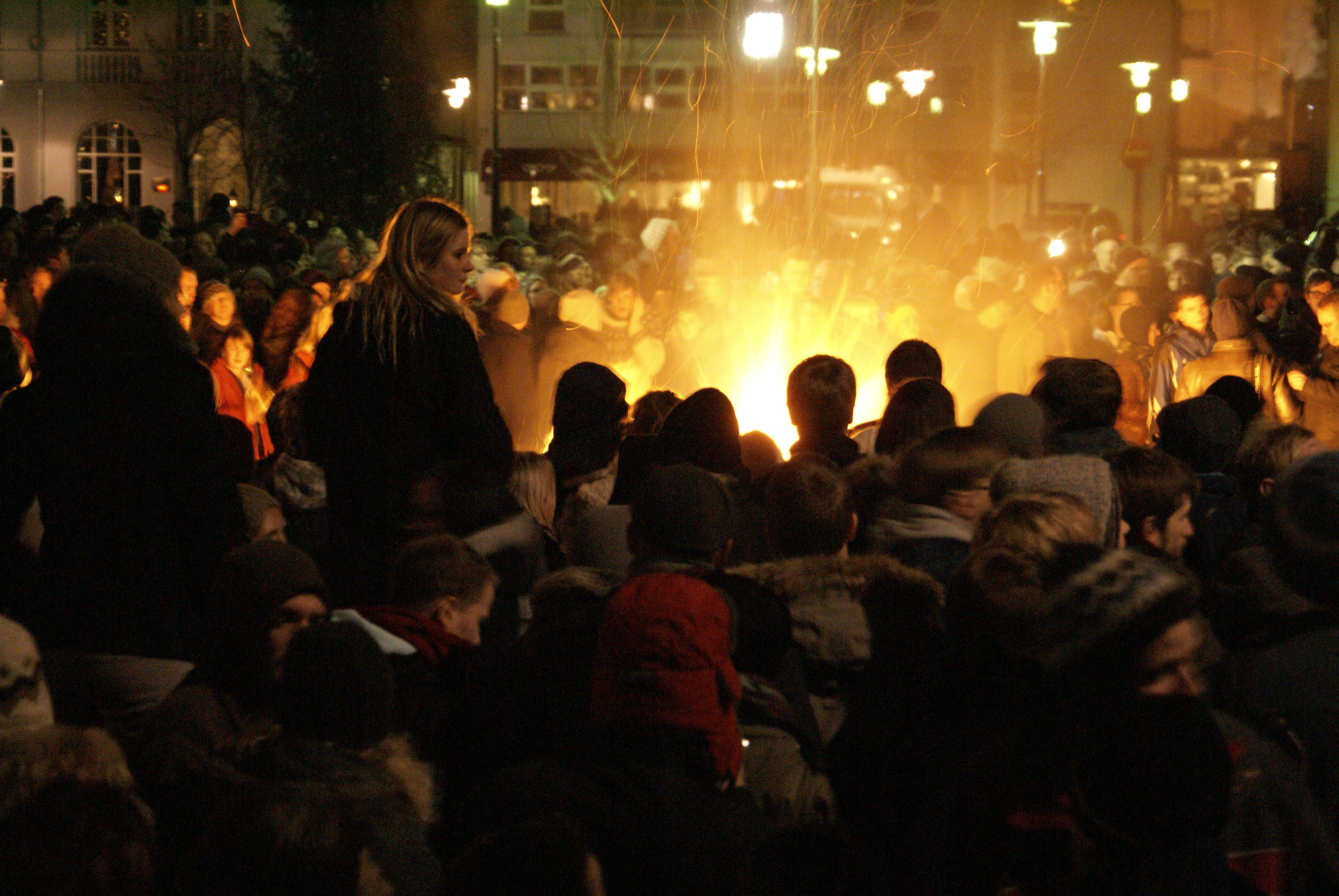
20 January 2009

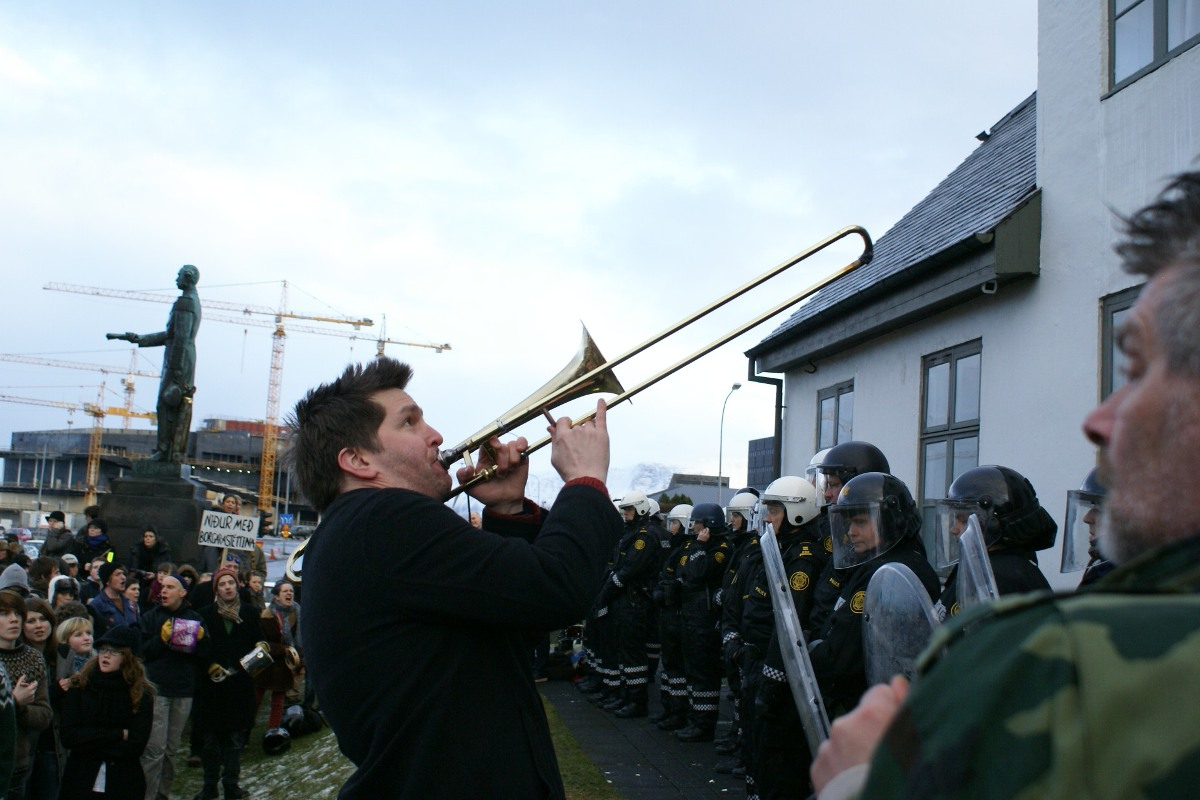
21 January 2009

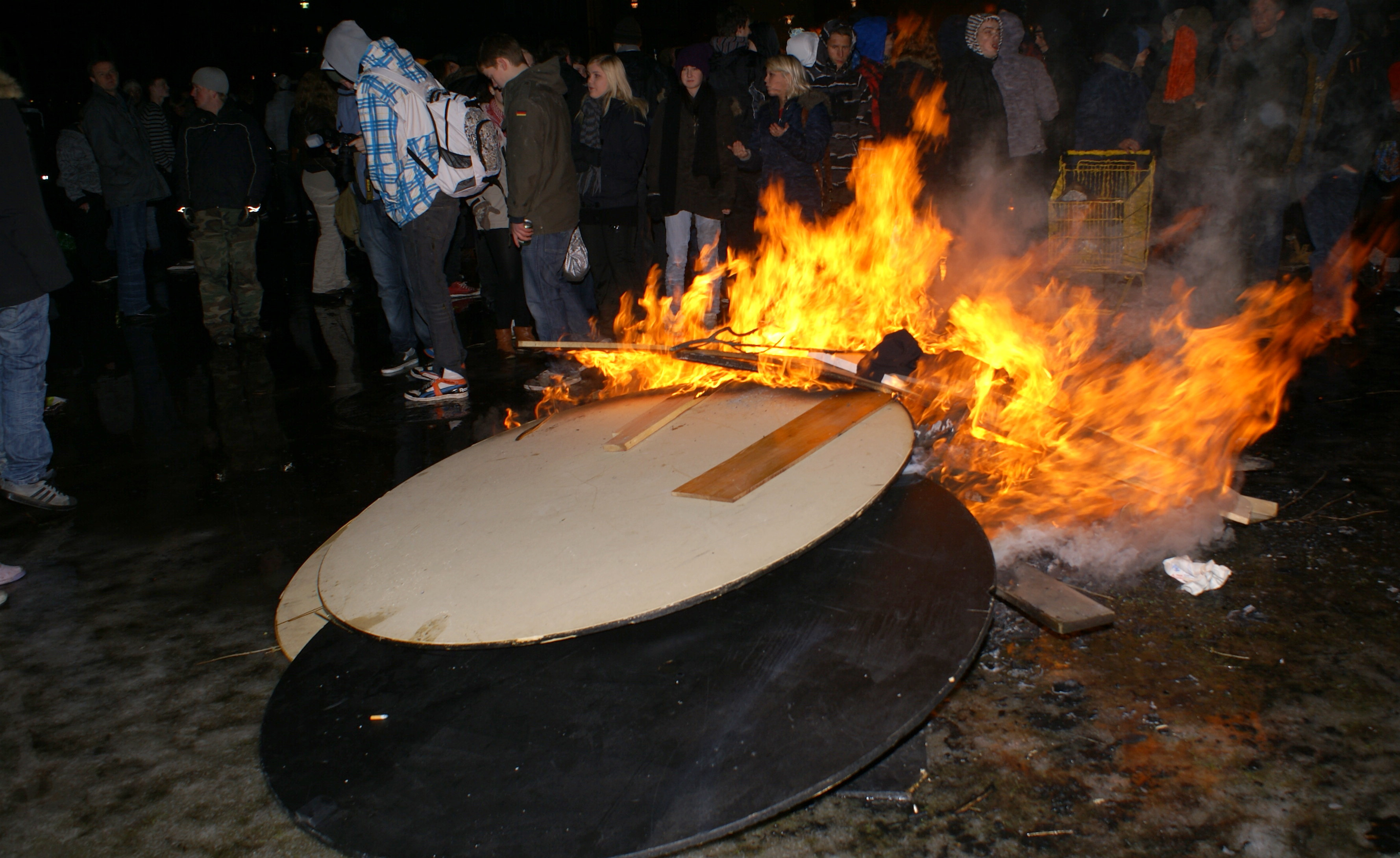
21 January 2009

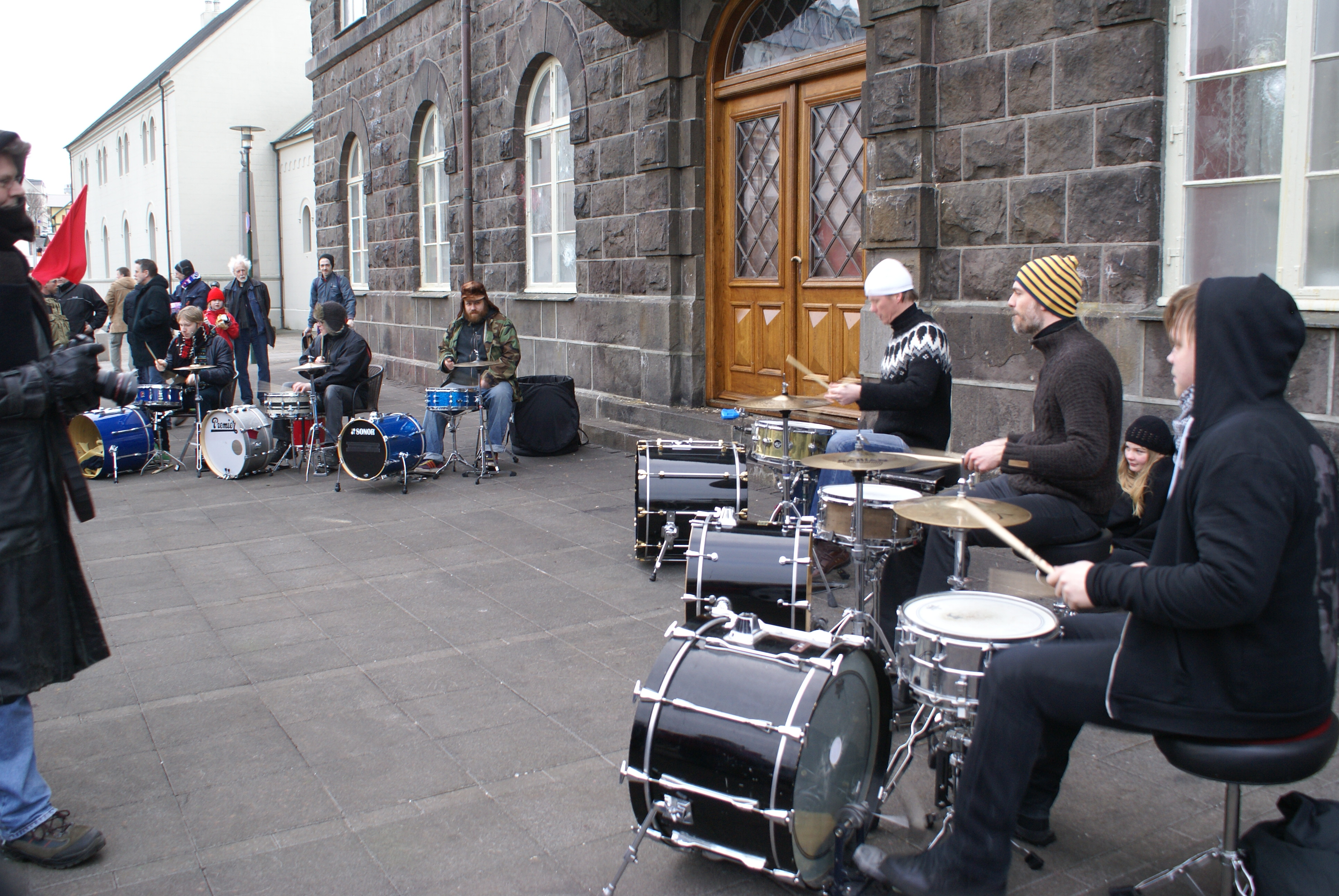
24 January 2009

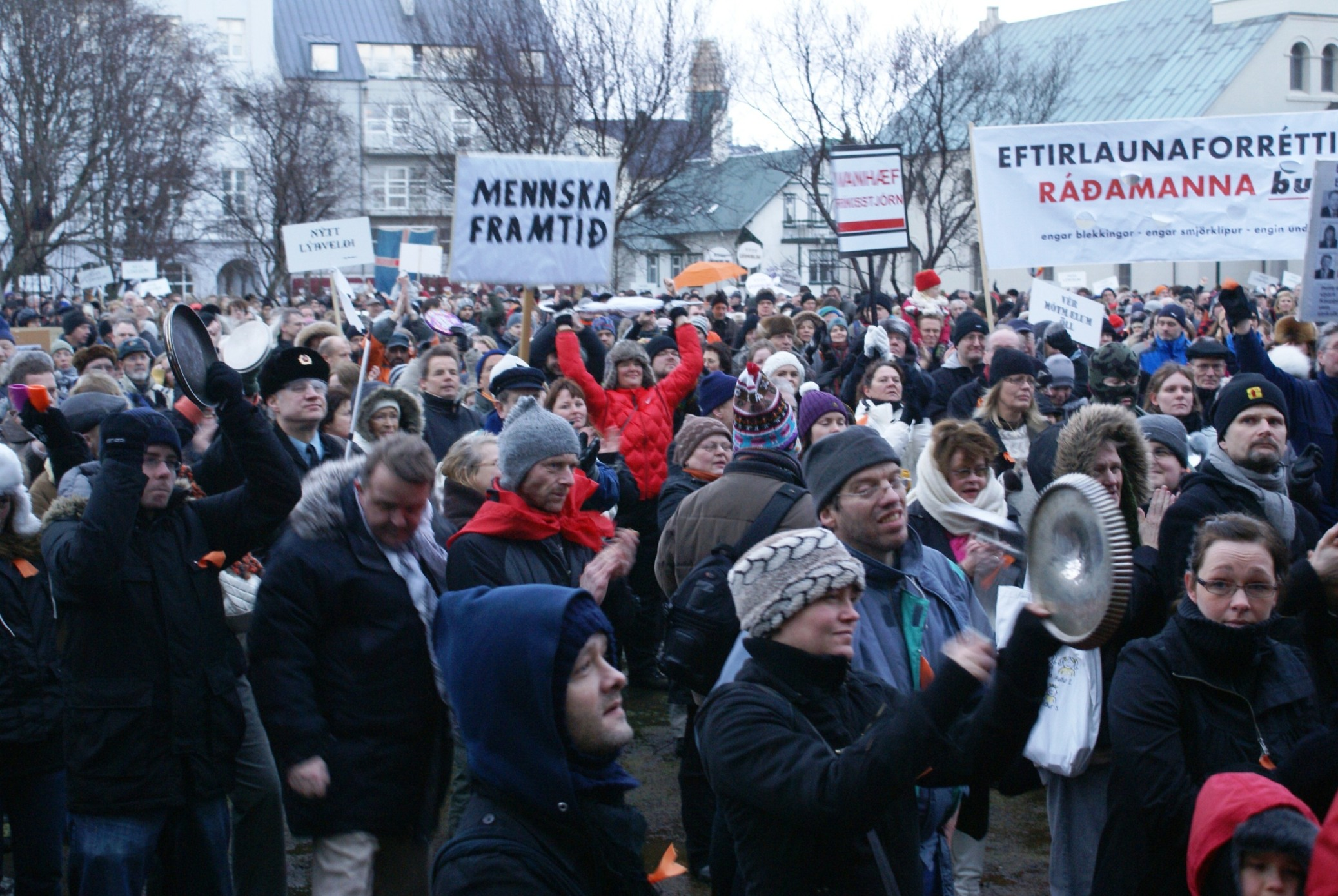
24 January 2009

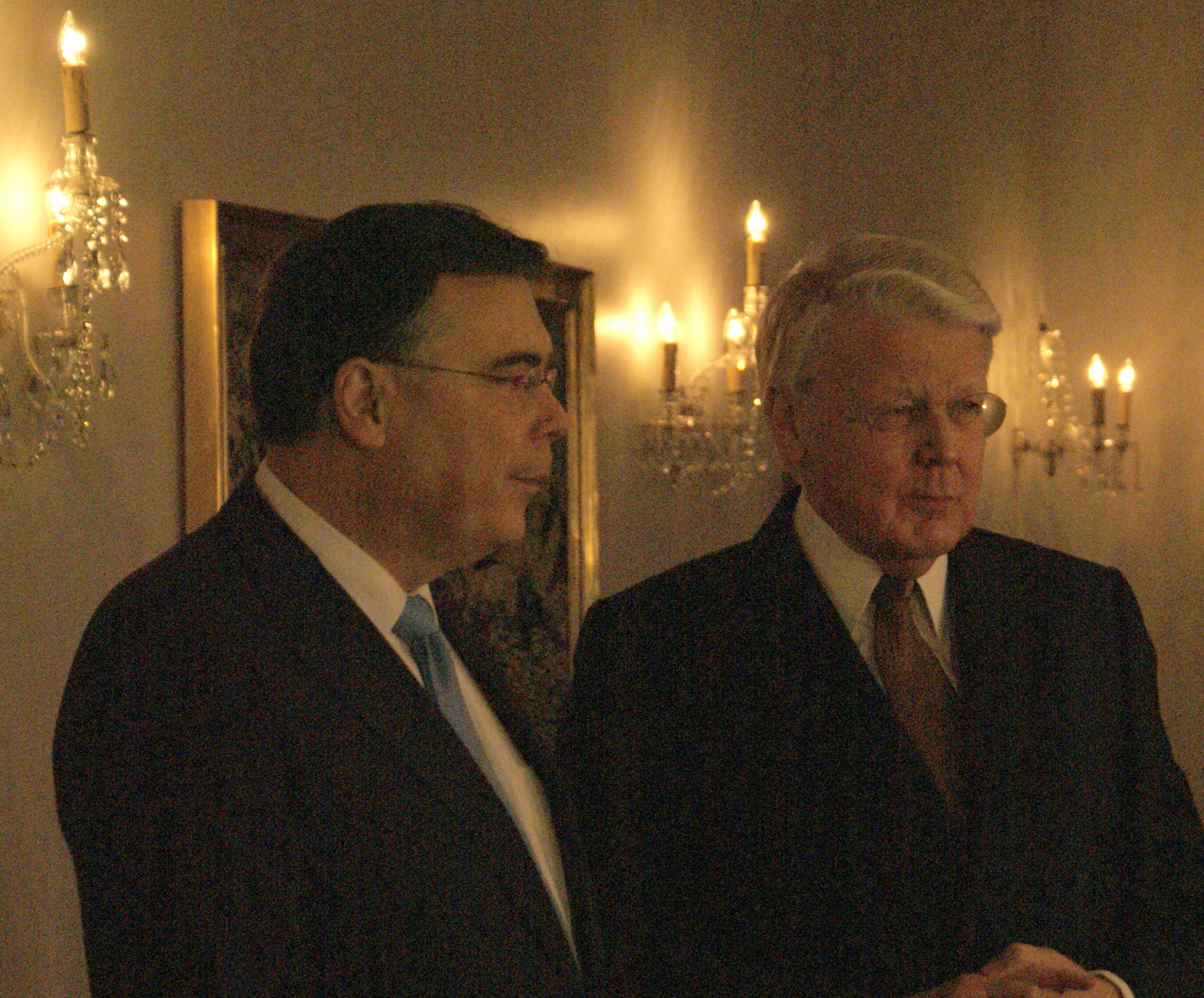
26 January 2009

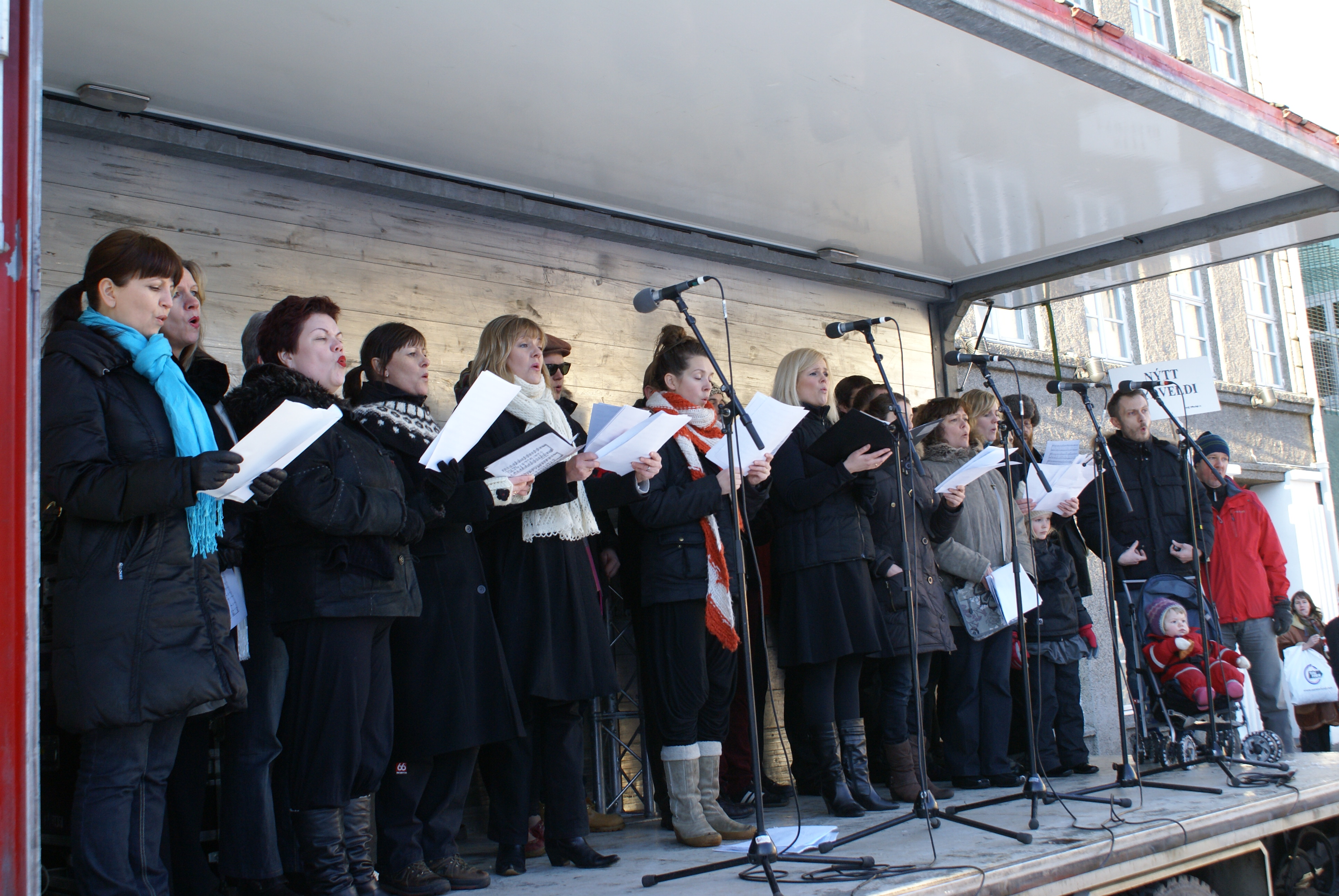
31 January 2009

== Banking debt referendums ==
There were several referendums to decide about the Icesave Icelandic bank debts. The first Icesave referendum (Icelandic: Þjóðaratkvæðagreiðsla um Icesave), was held on 6 March 2010. The referendum was resoundingly defeated, with 93% voting against and less than 2% in favor.

After the referendum, new negotiations commenced. On 16 February 2011 the Icelandic parliament agreed to a repayment deal to pay back the full amount starting in 2016, finalising before 2046, with a fixed interest rate of 3%. The Icelandic president once again refused to sign the new deal on 20 February, calling for a new referendum. Thus, a second referendum was held on 9 April 2011 also resulting in "no" victory with a lesser percentage. After the referendum failed to pass, the British and Dutch governments said that they would take the case to the European courts.

== PM trial ==
The Althing (Iceland's parliament) voted 33–30 to indict the former Prime Minister Geir Haarde, but not the other ministers, on charges of negligence in office at a session on 28 September 2010. He would stand trial before the Landsdómur, a special court to hear cases alleging misconduct in government office: it will be the first time the Landsdómur has convened since it was established in the 1905 Constitution.

The trial began in Reykjavík on 5 March 2012. Geir Haarde was found guilty on one of four charges on 23 April 2012, for not holding cabinet meetings on important state matters. Landsdómur said Haarde would face no punishment, as this was a minor offence and the Icelandic State was ordered to pay all his legal expenses. Haarde decided, as a matter of principle, to refer the whole case to the European Court of Human Rights in Strasbourg where it was eventually dismissed.

== Commentary ==
Roger Boyes of The Times argued the protests were part of a "new age of rebellion and riot" in Europe, in the background of similar protests caused by the financial crisis in Latvia, Bulgaria and the civil unrest in Greece, triggered by the police killing a teenager, but with deeper roots related to the financial crisis.

London School of Economics professor Robert Wade said that Iceland's government would fall within the coming days and Fredrik Erixon of the Brussels-based European Centre for International Political Economy compared the current situation with the French Revolution of 1789.

Eirikur Bergmann, an Icelandic political scientist, wrote in The Guardian that "While Barack Obama was being sworn into office on Capitol Hill yesterday, the people of Iceland were starting the first revolution in the history of the republic. The word "revolution" might sound a bit of an overstatement, but given the calm temperament that usually prevails in Icelandic politics, the unfolding events represent, at the very least, a revolution in political activism." Valur Gunnarsson, also of The Guardian, wrote that Iceland's government was scrambling to avoid becoming the first administration to be ousted by the 2008 financial crisis. He also wrote that "The protesters have begun referring to their daily attempt to oust the government as a 'saucepan revolution', because of the noise-inducing pots and pans brought along to the protests."

Eva Heiða Önnudóttir studied the demography of the protesters to see whether participants in the Austurvöllur protests came from groups with greater histories of political participation and greater access to political resources than non-participants, but found that this was not a determining factor: rather, participants were simply more likely to have a direct personal incentive to protest.

Timothy Heffernan, an anthropologist studying Iceland's social and political recovery, examined the protracted journey from the initial drafting of the new constitution to its ultimate shelving by the newly elected government in 2013, noting:

Following a tight election campaign, a Left-Right coalition government was formed between the Left-Green progressives and the conservative Independence Party. A decade after first being introduced as a means for social and democratic reform, the constitution remains no closer to being legislated, as the incumbent coalition has not signaled any intention of implementing it—despite survey results at the time of the 2017 election suggesting that more than 55 percent of Icelanders were in support of changing the constitution. The nation’s new draft document, therefore, represents a point of great contention between supporters and detractors, with the permanent shelving of the constitution ultimately reigniting debate over the credibility of the decision-making class in Iceland. At a time when political leaders are confronted by a “double crisis” of attending to constituents’ concerns and responding to global processes, legislating the new document has become a political hot potato in the context of a protracted economic crisis which has now morphed into a social and political one.

Writing in the wake of the 2013 Icelandic parliamentary election, which returned to power the parties most closely associated with Iceland's banking boom, Gísli Pálsson and E. Paul Durrenberger concluded that

While the grassroots movement that overthrew the government after the crash remains disillusioned and disappointed, its impact should not be under-estimated. One important development in its wake, and an important emerging theme for further research, is a series of experiments with direct democracy and social media. Soon after the crash, a crowd-sourcing company drew upon social media to prepare for a National Meeting (Þjóðfundur) of 1,000 participants for outlining a new constitution. While the end result of this work remains unclear, and much depends on the formal, indirect democracy of the Parliament, it seems safe to say that the public has been sensitized to new avenues for democracy and alerted to potential signs of corruption.

== See also ==
- 2008–2011 Icelandic financial crisis
- 2009 Iranian presidential election protests
- 2010–2011 Greek protests
- 15 October 2011 global protests
- 2011 Chilean protests
- 2011 Israeli social justice protests
- Spanish 15M Indignants movement
- 2011 United Kingdom anti-austerity protests
- 2012 Quebec student protests
- Anarchism in Iceland
- Arab Spring
- Impact of the Arab Spring
- "Occupy" protests
- Occupy Wall Street
- Protests of 1968
