= Flatus lifir =

Wall art in Iceland

- The grafiti in 2018
- Artist: Original artist unknown; 2010-2017 Unknown; 2017-2021 Elsa Jónsdóttir and Björn Loki Björnsson; 2021-current Edda Karólína Ævarsdóttir
- Year: 1980s
- Medium: Paint on concrete
- Movement: Graffiti
- Coordinates: 64°12′25″N 21°44′15″W

The wall in 2016

Flatus lifir, later repainted as flatus lifir enn, is a series of wall art on a concrete wall located at the base of Esja besides the Reykjavík-Borgarnes portion of Route 1.

== Artist ==
The original graffiti is believed to have been created in the 1980s but its creator is unknown. In 2017 Guðmundur Oddur Magnússon claimed that the original graffiti was created by the artist Róska in the 1970s.

== Interpretation ==
The meaning of the artwork is also unknown as the original graffiti, flatus lifir, does not have a meaning in Icelandic, although the later addition of the suffix enn changed the meaning of the graffiti to 'flatus still lives'. It has been suggested that flatus is in fact the Latin for fart, or that it is a corruption of the Icelandic term for Pthirus pubis.

== Repainting ==
In the 90's and early 2000's the wall was often painted white but the inscription was always painted on it again, with small variations like Flatus lifir enn! or Flatlús lifir. In 2010 the wall was professionally repainted with characters from Lucky Luke with the inscription Flatus lifir. In 2017 Elsa Jónsdóttir and Björn Loki Björnsson repainted the wall with a new theme inspired by the Latin meaning of the word flatus. In October 2021, a new version of the wall art was created by Edda Karólína Ævarsdóttir.
