= Hörður Torfason =

Icelandic songwriter and activist

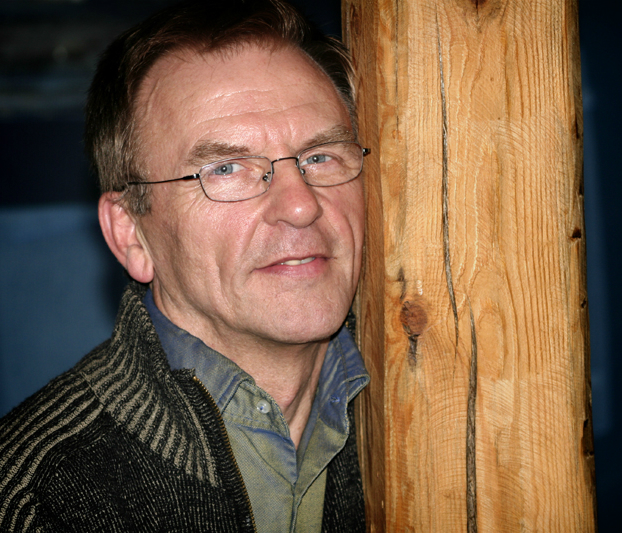
Hörður Torfason

Hörður Torfason (born 4 September 1945) is an Icelandic songwriter and activist. He has written plays and poetry, played numerous roles on stage and in several films, directed about 50 stage productions and designed and built stage sets for most of them.

== Biography ==
Hörður is the son of the couple Torfi Benediktsson and Anna Kristinsdóttir. He is the second oldest of six siblings.

Trained as an actor at the drama school of the National Theatre of Iceland in the spring of 1970, he also worked as a director from 1971. With his first album, which he recorded in the summer of 1970 (Hörður Torfason syngur eigin lög, 'Hörður Torfason sings his own songs'), he had a tremendous impact on Icelandic music and many took him as a model. Hörður has often been referred to as the 'Þjóðleikhús landsbyggðarinnar' ('National Theatre of the Countryside') because for decades he traveled around the country at least once every year with concerts. He has worked independently since 1973, which is to say that his music and other labour has not used the grant money of rich people or companies. Hörður has put out 23 albums.

Already a national figure, in 1975 he was the first person in Iceland to publicly come out of the closet, which made him a human-rights activist. He was the inspiration and main founder of Samtökin '78. He was later also the founder, thinker, developer and spokesman for the organisation Raddir fólksins ('people's voices') in 2008 following the 2008 Icelandic financial crisis. He also conducted influential demonstrations at the Ministry of Education in the summer of 2008 over the case of Poul Ramses. As a thinker in the Kitchenware Revolution and a human-rights campaigner, he has travelled widely around the world and lectured about his methods.

In autumn 2008, his biography Tabú (Taboo), written by Ævar Örn Jósepsson, was published. In October 2018, his book Bylting (Revolution) was published.
