= Haldor =

Haldor is a given name. It may refer to:

- Haldor Andreas Haldorsen (1883–1965), Norwegian politician for the Liberal Party
- Haldor Børve (1857–1933), Norwegian architect
- Haldor Bjerkeseth (1883–1974), Norwegian politician for the Christian Democratic Party
- Haldor Boen (1851–1912), American congressman from Minnesota
- Haldor Halderson (1900–1965), Canadian ice hockey player who competed in the 1920 Summer Olympics
- Haldor Johan Hanson (1856–1929), American hymn writer, publisher and author
- Haldor Lægreid, Norwegian musical artist
- Haldor Lillenas (1885–1959), minister in the Church of the Nazarene, author, song evangelist, poet, music publisher and prolific hymnwriter

== See also ==
- Haldor Topsoe, Danish catalyst company
- Halldor
