= Halldórsson =

Halldórsson is a surname of Icelandic origin, meaning son of Halldór. In Icelandic names, the name is not strictly a surname, but a patronymic. Notable people with the name include:

- Björgvin Halldórsson (1951–2026), Icelandic pop singer
- Björn Halldórsson (1724–1794), Icelandic priest and author
- Hannes Þór Halldórsson (born 1984), Icelandic football player
- Haukur Halldórsson (1937–2024), Icelandic painter
- Jón Halldórsson (bishop) (1275–1339), Norwegian-born Icelandic Roman Catholic clergyman; Bishop of Iceland 1322–39
- Óskar Halldórsson (1921–1983), Icelandic scholar of Icelandic sagas
