= Dóra Ísleifsdóttir =

Icelandic designer and artist (born 1970)

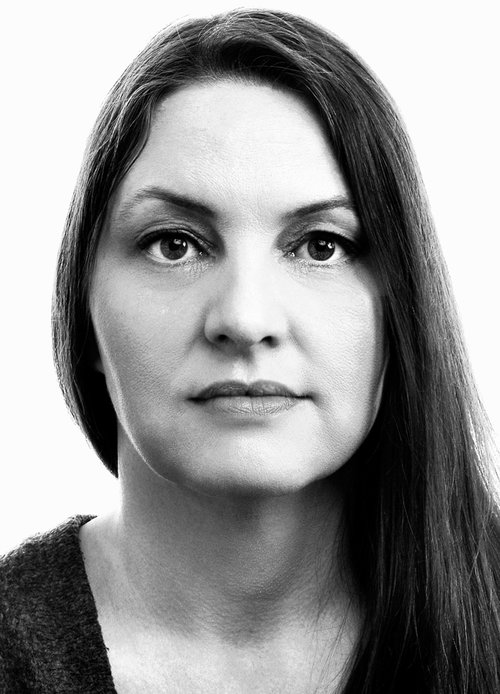
- Portrait of Dóra from a passport photo, 2017
- Born: Halldóra Guðrún Ísleifsdóttir; 1970 (age 55–56)
- Website: Dóra Ísleifsdóttir on Instagram

Dóra Ísleifsdóttir (born 1970) is an Icelandic visual communication designer, artist, and design activist.

== Work ==
Dóra was program director of Visual communication design at the Iceland University of the Arts, formerly Iceland Academy of the Arts, Department of Design and Architecture from 2006 to 2012, where she authored the MA in Design served as program director from 2012 to 2017, and was professor in Visual communication there from 2012, where she was established Mæna, a magazine about Visual communication in Iceland, and was the magazine's editor from 2009 until 2014, and on the editorial board until 2017. She was an associate professor in Visual communication at KMD, University of Bergen, Norway since 2017, and became professor in early 2019. At KMD she is editor of Ymt magazine. Her Artistic research focuses on Discursive design and Metadesign through Editorial design and publishing, and includes co-editorship / Editorial board membership for Message journal, an international academic journal on Graphic communication design, published by Plymouth University Press.

She was a founding member of the Icelandic Love Corporation from 1996 to 2001 with Eirún Sigurðardóttir, Jóní Jónsdóttir, and Sigrún Inga Hrólfsdóttir. Dóra was owner and curator with Jóní Jónsdóttir and Særún Stefánsdóttir at the Reykjavík underground gallery Undir pari (transl. Under a Couple) that ran only from 1997 to 1998 but where many of Reykjavík's artists featured, such as Sigur Rós's Jónsi under the name Frakkur, Goddur, with Bjarni H. Þórarinsson, Aenne Langhorst, Suðurgata 7 — a retrospective; and many more. During the gallery's short life-span a number of Reykjavík's musicians, poets, actors, and visual artists featured there in a regular salon show held monthly (called in Icelandic: Smáhátíð), such as Huldar Breiðfjörð, Didda, Ingólfur Arnarson, Hallgrímur Helgason, Daníel Magnússon, Oliver Perry Kochta, Egill Sæbjörnsson, Barði Jóhannsson, and Ragnar Kjartansson to name a few.

She worked at a number of Icelandic Advertising agencies from 1995 to 2006, including Fastland where she was partner, and Gott folk McCann Ericson, owned by Universal McCann / Interpublic Group of Companies, where she was art director then creative director 1998 to 2001. In 2017 she was made honorary member of FÍT (Félags íslenskra teiknara or the Icelandic Association of Graphic designers) for her contribution to the advancement of the field.

== Activism ==
During the 2009–2011 Icelandic financial crisis protests Dóra was widely involved in grassroots initiatives, was noted for her work in mobilizing designers to action in the academy and without, and was project manager for the Iceland Academy of the Arts in the transformational House of Ideas, and board member of Alda, Association for Sustainability and Democracy. Alda is a non-partisan think tank and lobby group that has proposed numerous policy amendments to the Icelandic political system, as well as those concerning environmental governance, which Dóra has spoken on behalf of on various occasions. She was invited to speak for Raddir fólksins (Voice of the People) on Austurvöllur on 3 January 2009 during the 2009 Icelandic financial crisis protests. She represented Iceland and design for the Iceland University of the Arts in the Northern Future Forum Reykjavík in 2015. Her work as a feminist activist has focused on gender equality in the advertising industry.
