= Roger Boyes =

British journalist and author

Roger Boyes (born 7 August 1952 in Hereford, England) is a British journalist and author. He is the diplomatic editor for the London Times newspaper. He also has a column in the German newspaper Der Tagesspiegel entitled 'My Berlin'.

Boyes entered journalism as a Reuters correspondent in Moscow (1976–1977), joining the Financial Times as an Eastern Europe specialist in 1978 and was the Bonn correspondent of the FT from 1979 to 1981. He then switched to The Times and became the newspaper's Eastern Europe correspondent based in Warsaw where he covered the Solidarity revolution and the imposition of martial law. Since then, he has been posted to Rome as a Southern Europe correspondent (1987–89), Bonn and Berlin correspondent 1993- 2010.

== Works ==
- The Naked President: Political Life of Lech Walesa (1994)
- My Dear Krauts (2006)
- How to be a Kraut (2007)
- A Year in the Scheisse: Getting to Know the Germans (2008)
- Meltdown Iceland: How the Global Financial Crisis Bankrupted Iceland, the Happiest State in the World (2009)

== Works as co-author ==
- The Priest and the Policeman: The Courageous Life and Cruel Murder of Father Jerzy Popieluszko (1987)
- Surviving Hitler: Corruption and Compromise in the Third Reich (2000)
- Sezon na Europe (2003)
- Is it easier to be a Turk in Berlin or a Pakistani in Bradford? (2004)
- Seduced by Hitler (2007)
- Roger Boyes and Suzy Jagger New State, Modern Statesman Hashim Thaçi – A Biography (2017)
