= Guðmundur Oddur Magnússon =

Icelandic artist and academic (1955–2026)

Goddur
- Born: Guðmundur Oddur Magnússon; 5 June 1955; Akureyri, Iceland
- Died: 3 January 2026 (aged 70); Biskupstungnabraut, Árborg, Iceland
- Education: Icelandic College of Art and Crafts
- Alma mater: ECU
- Website: Gudmundur Oddur Magnusson on Instagram

Guðmundur Oddur Magnússon (5 June 1955 – 3 January 2026), known as Goddur, was an Icelandic artist and academic who was a professor at the Iceland Academy of the Arts' Department of Architecture and Design. He died on 3 January 2026, at the age of 70.
