= Halldór =

Halldór (Icelandic pronunciation: [ˈhalːˌtouːr̥]) or Halldor is a given name. Notable people with the name include:

- Halldór Ásgrímsson (born 1947), Icelandic politician, formerly Prime Minister of Iceland from 2004 to 2006
- Halldór Orri Björnsson (born 1987), Icelandic international footballer
- Halldór Blöndal (born 1938), politician of the Independence Party (Iceland)
- Lárus Halldór Grímsson (born 1954), Icelandic composer and musician
- Halldór Guðmundsson (born 1956), Icelandic author
- Halldór Helgason (born 1991), Icelandic professional snowboarder
- Jón Halldór Kristjánsson (born 1942), Icelandic politician and former Minister of Social Affairs
- Halldór Laxness (1902–1998), Icelandic novelist and author of Independent People, The Atom Station, and Iceland's Bell
- Halldór Eggert Sigurðsson (1915–2003), Icelandic politician and former minister
- Halldor Skard (born 1973), former Norwegian Nordic combined skier who competed from 1990 to 2000
- Halldor Stenevik (born 2000), Norwegian footballer

== See also ==
- Halldóra, the feminine form
- Haldor
